= List of judges of the District Court of NSW =

Judicial bench of New South Wales

In 1858 the district courts were established with a civil jurisdiction up to £200 replacing the Court of Requests which only sat in limited places, (Note: Predominatnly Sydney, Parramatta, Liverpool, Penrith and Windsor, but also Penrith, Campbelltown, Camden, Wollongong, Bong Bong, Berrima, Bathurst, and Maitland.) and had a general claim limit of £10 to £30. Initially each judge was appointed to a specific district. From 1955 judges were appointed to all district courts.

Serious criminal matters that were not punishable by death were heard by the courts of quarter sessions. From 1858 each district court judge had a concurrent appointment as chairman of the courts of quarter sessions for the district to which they were appointed. In 1973 the separate district courts and courts of quarter sessions were replaced by a single District Court which exercised both criminal and civil jurisdiction throughout the state.

The position of Chairman of the District Court Judges was introduced in 1950 to exercise administrative functions in relation to the courts similar to role of the Chief Justice in the Supreme Court. The role was renamed Chief Judge with the restructure of the courts in 1973.

The Compensation Court of New South Wales was abolished on 1 January 2004 and the judges were transferred to the District Court, maintaining their seniority based on the date of their appointment to the Compensation Court.

In 1918 the Judges Retirement Act 1918 (NSW), operated to retrospectively impose a retirement age of 70 immediately affecting Charles Heydon, Ernest Docker and Grantley Fitzhardinge and subsequently other judges in a similar position, such as Montgomerie Hamilton and Alfred Backhouse.

Position	Name	Appointment commenced	Appointment ended	Term in office	Comments	Notes			
Chairman of Judges	John Nield (Note: It is unknown whether there is any relationship between John Roscoe Nield (1892–1975) and John Roscoe Nield appointed 1988.)	16 February 1950	7 February 1954	3 years, 356 days	Acting Judge of the Supreme Court (January 1952); Judge of the Supreme Court (1954–1962)				
Chairman of Judges	Alan Lloyd ED QC	1954	1959	4–5 years	Acting Judge District Court (1932, 1935 & 1938); Judge District Court (1947–1959)				
Chairman of Judges	Christopher Monahan	25 May 1959	13 March 1971	11 years, 292 days					
Chairman of Judges; Chief Judge (Note: Title was changed from Chairman of the District Court Judges to Chief Judge with the restructure of the courts in 1973.)	James Staunton CBE QC	1 April 1971	12 December 1994	23 years, 255 days					
Chief Judge	Reg Blanch AM	13 December 1994	7 August 2014	19 years, 219 days	Director of Public Prosecutions (1987–1994); Judge of the Supreme Court (1994 & 2002)				
Chief Judge	Derek Price AM	8 August 2014		12 years, 100 days	Judge of District Court (2000–2006); Chief Magistrate Local Court (2002–2010); Judge of the Supreme Court (2006–)				
Chief Judge	Sarah Huggett	16 April 2024		2 years, 214 days	Judge of District Court (2012–2023); Judge of the Supreme Court (2023–2024)				
Judge	Alfred Cheeke	22 December 1858	11 June 1865	6 years, 171 days	Commissioner to the Courts of Requests (1845–1858); Judge of the Supreme Court (1865–1876)				
Judge	Thomas Callaghan	22 December 1858	28 November 1863	4 years, 341 days	Commissioner to the Courts of Requests (–1858)				
Judge	James Sheen Dowling (Note: James Sheen Dowling was the son of Chief Justice Sir James Dowling.)	22 December 1858	31 July 1889	30 years, 221 days	Acting Judge of the Supreme Court (1878–1881)				
Judge	Henry Cary	3 February 1859	September 1869	10 years, 210–239 days					
Judge	John Hargrave	3 February 1859	21 February 1859	18 days	Judge of the Supreme Court (1865–1881)				
Judge	Robert Owen	1 March 1859	30 June 1861	2 years, 121 days					
Judge	William Alexander Purefoy	25 July 1861	30 May 1867	5 years, 309 days					
Judge	Isidore Blake	25 July 1861	1865	3–4 years					
Judge	Henry Ralph Francis	1 July 1861	7 June 1875	13 years, 341 days					
Judge	Frederick William Meymott	15 December 1863	5 November 1880	16 years, 326 days		(Note: Over a number of years Meymott had failed to attend various courts in the northern district. The Executive Council decided not to remove the judge and instead admonished and reprimanded Meymott and deducted the expenses of a replacement from his judicial salary. The Supreme Court held that there was no power to reduce a judge's salary and that the only way to deal with misconduct by a judge was to remove them. There was a royal Commission into Meymott's conduct and he was subsequently removed from office.)			
Judge	Alfred McFarland	14 December 1865	December 1891	25–26 years	Judge of the civil and criminal courts of Western Australia.				
Judge	(Sir) George Simpson	20 August 1867	31 July 1874	6 years, 345 days	Judge of the Supreme Court (1894–1910)				
Judge	Joshua Josephson	10 September 1869	October 1884	14–15 years					
Judge	David Grant Forbes (Note: David Forbes was the son of Chief Justice Francis Forbes)	8 June 1875	30 June 1898	15–16 years	Acting Judge District Court (1871–1873, 1875)				
Judge	William Hattam Wilkinson	21 September 1874	October 1893	18–19 years	Deputy Judge District Court (1868–1870, 1874); Commissioner of the Court of Claims (1894–1905)				
Judge	Ernest Docker	5 January 1881	31 December 1918 (Note: Retired as a result of the passage of the Judges Retirement Act 1918 which introduced the retirement age of 70 years.)	37 years, 360 days	Judge on Norfolk Island (1894)				
Judge	Charles Edward Robinson Murray	August 1878	October 1916	19–20 years					
Judge	Grantley Fitzhardinge	1890	31 December 1918	27–28 years					
Judge	Alfred Backhouse	1884	May 1921	36–37 years	Acting Judge of the Supreme Court (1895–1898)				
Judge	Frederick William Gibson	1893	24 October 1914	20–21 years					
Judge	William Henry Coffey	1894	1899	4–5 years					
Judge	Francis Edward Rogers QC	1898	1910	19–20 years					
Judge	Charles Heydon QC	1 March 1900	31 December 1918	18 years, 305 days	President of the Court of Arbitration (1905–1908); Court of Industrial Arbitration (1908–1918)				
Judge	Edward Scholes	1 August 1908	29 May 1928	19 years, 302 days	President Industrial Court (1911–1912)				
Judge	Walter Edmunds QC	2 August 1911	5 January 1926	14 years, 156 days	Acting Judge District Court (1905–1911); Court of Industrial Arbitration (1914–); Industrial Court of NSW (1920–1926)				
Judge	Montgomerie Hamilton	12 May 1914	1 July 1924	19 years, 302 days	Acting Judge District Court (1900–1914)	(Note: Hamilton had served as an Acting Judge in every court except for Broken Hill, Bourke and Cobar.)			
Judge	Walter Bevan	3 November 1914	December 1926	12 years, 28–58 days	Solicitor General for New South Wales (1911–1912)				
Judge	John Cohen	31 January 1919	20 December 1929	10 years, 323 days					
Judge	Edwin Mayhew Brissenden MBE KC	24 July 1919	13 September 1919	51 days (Note: Brissenden was appointed while on active military service in France but resigned after returning home before taking his seat on the bench.)					
Judge	Laurens Frederic Matthews Armstrong	3 February 1919	12 October 1932	13 years, 252 days					
Judge	Cecil Alban White	15 March 1920	29 September 1939	19 years, 198 days					
Judge	William Hugh Mocatta KC	14 August 1922	November 1931	9 years, 93 days					
Judge	William Thomas Coyle KC	1 February 1927	November 1938	11 years, 287 days	Judge on Norfolk Island (1935)				
Judge	John Patrick Garvan Sheridan KC	28 January 1930	5 September 1938	8 years, 220 days					
Judge	David Edwards	1 July 1924	5 July 1935	11 years, 4 days					
Judge	Herbert Curlewis (Note: Sir Adrian Curlewis is the son of Herbert Curlewis)	1 July 1928	31 July 1939	11 years, 30 days	Judge of the Court of Industrial Arbitration (1917–1926)				
Judge	Alec Thomson KC	28 May 1928	6 September 1938	10 years, 101 days					
Judge	John Clancy	13 November 1931	9 July 1947	15 years, 238 days	Judge of the Supreme Court (1947–1965)				
Judge	Edmund Alfred Barton (Note: Edmund Alfred Barton was the son of High Court judge Sir Edmund Barton.)	1 April 1933	31 May 1949	16 years, 60 days	Acting Judge District Court (1932–1933); Acting Judge of the Supreme Court (1939–1940)				
Judge	John Nield	1 January 1934	7 February 1954	20 years, 37 days	Chairman District Court Judges (1950–1954); Acting Judge of the Supreme Court (January 1952); Judge of the Supreme Court (1954–1962)				
Judge	Horace Francis Markell KC	1 August 1935	12 February 1952	16 years, 195 days	Acting Judge District Court (1928–1932); Acting Judge of the Supreme Court (1934, 1935 & 1952)				
Judge	Selwyn Betts	7 June 1937	14 October 1938	1 year, 129 days					
Judge	Henry George Edwards	6 September 1938	21 May 1939	257 days	Acting Judge District Court (1935–1937); Acting Judge of the Supreme Court (1937–1938); Member Industrial Commission of NSW (1939–1940); Judge of the Supreme Court (1940–1952)				
Judge	Norman McGhie	1 October 1938	31 August 1944	5 years, 335 days					
Judge	Arthur Gordon Hill	3 October 1938	25 December 1942	4 years, 83 days					
Judge	Percy Douglas Shortland	1 August 1939	27 October 1950	11 years, 87 days	Acting Judge District Court (1939)				
Judge	Bertie Vandaleur (Baron) Stacy CMG, DSO	27 March 1939	7 December 1956	17 years, 255 days					
Judge	Percy Storkey VC	1 June 1939	1955	15–16 years					
Judge	Henry Thomas Eulert Holt QC (Note: Judge Henry Holt was the father of judge John Holt.)	1 August 1939	May 1965	25 years, 273–303 days					
Judge	Hilary James Studdert QC	1 January 1941	16 August 1948	7 years, 228 days	Acting Judge District Court (1939–1940)				
Judge	Ted Kinsella	19 January 1943	6 October 1943	260 days	Member of the Industrial Commission of NSW (1943–1950); Judge of the Supreme Court (1950–1963)				
Judge	Frederick Witton Berne	7 October 1943	1960	16–17 years					
Judge	(Sir) Richard Kirby	23 August 1944	25 August 1947	3 years, 2 days	Commonwealth Court of Conciliation and Arbitration (1947–1973); President Commonwealth Conciliation and Arbitration Commission (1956–1973)				
Judge	Thomas Holden	15 October 1945	1965	19–20 years					
Judge	Joe Lamaro	1 December 1947	22 May 1951	3 years, 172 days					
Judge	Alan Lloyd QC	17 December 1947	1959	11–12 years	Acting Judge District Court (1932, 1935 & 1938); Chairman of District Court Judges (1954–1959)				
Judge	Sir Adrian Curlewis CVO, CBE	1 September 1948	19 December 1970	22 years, 109 days	Acting Judge District Court (1948)				
Judge	Samual Redshaw	7 February 1949	1956	6–7 years	Acting Judge District Court (1944)				
Judge	Gerald O'Sullivan	27 February 1950	11 September 1960	10 years, 197 days	Acting Judge of the Supreme Court (1952 & 1953)				
Judge	David Henry McKillop	11 December 1950	12 November 1971	20 years, 336 days					
Judge	Russel Brereton (Note: Russel Brereton was the father of Supreme Court Judge Paul Brereton.)	19 July 1951	10 September 1952	1 year, 53 days	Judge of the Supreme Court (1952–1974)				
Judge	John Brennan	22 October 1951	15 February 1977	25 years, 116 days	Acting Judge of the Supreme Court (1953)				
Judge	Frank Stephen QC	12 September 1952	20 February 1967	14 years, 161 days	Acting Judge of the Supreme Court (1953 & 1956)				
Judge	George Amsberg QC	27 October 1952	June 1968	15–16 years					
Judge	Jack Phineas Fitzpatrick	1 April 1953	1970	16–17 years					
Judge	Eric Clegg QC	1 April 1953	8 March 1971	17 years, 341 days					
Judge	Jack Harvey Prior	1 April 1953	1970	16–17 years					
Judge	Charles Vincent Rooney MM, QC	4 February 1954	1964	9–10 years					
Judge	John Michael Bruxner	9 June 1954	1973	18–19 years					
Judge	Lyn Cuthbert Furnell QC	11 October 1954	1973	18–19 years					
Judge	Aaron Levine (Note: Judge David Levine was the son of Judge Aaron Levine.)	16 May 1955	1972	16–17 years					
Judge	Francis Charles Hidden	12 September 1955	1967	11–12 years					
Judge	Alistair Cameron-Smith	20 May 1957	1983	14–15 years					
Judge	Ronald Francis Cross	10 June 1957	1978	20–21 years					
Judge	Gerald Patrick Donovan	3 April 1958	1974	15–16 years					
Judge	William Brendan Perrignon	3 April 1958	1962	6–7 years					
Judge	David Francis Lewis QC	4 April 1960	1968	7–8 years					
Judge	Jack Adrian Clapin QC	4 October 1960	17 November 1969	9 years, 44 days					
Judge	Gregory Bede Thomas	1 March 1961	1967	5–6 years					
Judge	James Elie Hamilton Pilcher ED	4 November 1963	1973	9–10 years					
Judge	Phillip Lyburn Head MBE, QC	28 January 1964	1977	12–13 years					
Judge	Alfred Joseph Goran QC	22 March 1966	1984	17–18 years					
Judge	Noel Desmond McIntosh QC	18 October 1965	3 February 1973	7 years, 108 days					
Judge	Russell Jack Miller Newton QC	4 March 1966	1980	13–14 years					
Judge	David Stuart Hicks QC	31 January 1967	1982	14–15 years					
Judge	Kenneth Frederick Erskine Torrington	8 August 1967	20 January 1988	20 years, 165 days					
Judge	Alastair Gibson Muir QC	1 February 1968	8 January 1988	19 years, 341 days					
Judge	Hereward Henchman QC (Note: Hereward John Humfry Henchman was the son of Hereward Humfry Henchman a judge of the Supreme Court of Queensland)	1 February 1968	24 July 1974	6 years, 173 days	Acting Judge of the Supreme Court (1966–1967)				
Judge	John Lincoln	20 May 1968	1986	17–18 years	Acting Judge of the Supreme Court 1967				
Judge	Samuel Ross	20 May 1968	1973	4–5 years					
Judge	Barrie Ronald Thorley	2 December 1968	2 December 1987	19 years, 0 days					
Judge	Michael Desmond Healy QC	19 January 1970	15 September 1974	4 years, 239 days					
Judge	Hugh Walter Robson QC	20 April 1970	1983	12–13 years					
Judge	Walter Perry Redapple	2 February 1971	1981	9–10 years					
Judge	Peter Ayton Leslie	2 February 1971	25 July 1982	11 years, 154 days					
Judge	David Laurie Godfrey-Smith QC	1 April 1971	1987	15–16 years					
Judge	Ray Loveday QC	15 November 1971	29 April 1988	16 years, 166 days	Judge of the Supreme Court (1988–1993)				
Judge	John Alan Melville QC	8 August 1972	1984	11–12 years					
Judge	George Hillary Smith QC	16 October 1972	1986	13–14 years					
Judge	Carl Reginald Shannon QC	30 January 1973	1982	8–9 years					
Judge	William Desmond Thomas Ward ED, QC	30 January 1973	1992	26–27 years					
Judge	Thomas Alfred Milton Boulter MM, ED, QC	27 April 1973	1983	9–10 years					
Judge	Ernest Paul Knoblanche QC	30 May 1973	28 March 1991	17 years, 302 days					
Judge	Trevor James Martin QC	9 October 1973	1983	9–10 years					
Judge	Marcele Emile Pile QC	19 March 1974	1981	6–7 years					
Judge	Ken Gee QC	7 August 1974	1985	10–11 years					
Judge	Hubert Henry Bell	7 August 1974	18 August 1997	23 years, 11 days					
Judge	Richard Thornton Harvey Barbour QC	11 March 1975	8 April 1994	19 years, 28 days					
Judge	Joseph Kevin Ford QC	1 February 1977; 22 January 1993	31 July 1991; 1 August 1997	14 years, 180 days 4 years, 191 days	Head of NSW Crime Commission; Acting Judge District Court (1998–2000)				
Judge	Adrian Roden QC	1 February 1977	3 December 1978	1 year, 305 days	Judge of the Supreme Court (1978–1989)				
Judge	Anthony Joseph Coates	9 March 1977	1983	5–6 years					
Judge	John Bowdich Sinclair QC	6 April 1977	1998	20–21	Acting Judge District Court (1998–2001)				
Judge	Donald Stewart	23 August 1977	1981	3–4 years	Judge of the Supreme Court (1981–1984)				
Judge	Jerrold Cripps QC	4 October 1977	18 August 1980	2 years, 319 days	Judge of the Land and Environment Court (1980–1992)				
Judge	John Murray Foord QC	1 May 1978	17 September 1986	8 years, 139 days					
Judge	Anthony David Collins QC	15 May 1978	1992	13–14 years					
Judge	Harvey Leslie Cooper	15 May 1978	22 March 2004	25 years, 312 days					
Judge	Brian John Herron QC	28 August 1978	3 November 2002	24 years, 67 days					
Judge	John Lawrence O'Meally RFD	23 July 1979	18 November 2011	32 years, 118 days	Compensation Court				
Judge	Jane Mathews AO	31 March 1980	6 July 1987	7 years, 97 days					
Judge	William Thomas Ducker	5 May 1980	31 January 2003	22 years, 271 days					
Judge	John Graham Smyth QC	18 August 1980	29 January 1995	14 years, 164 days					
Judge	Michael Joseph Williams	30 March 1981	17 December 1986	5 years, 262 days					
Judge	William Harding Denton QC	1 September 1981	16 October 1989	8 years, 45 days					
Judge	Salvatore Francesco Sudano	7 September 1981	18 December 1989	8 years, 102 days					
Judge	Colin Lionel James Bowie QC	24 November 1981	18 July 1987	5 years, 236 days					
Judge	John Cecil McGuire	23 August 1982	6 May 2006	23 years, 256 days					
Judge	Paul Francis Flannery QC (Note: Leonie Flannery SC is the daughter of former Judge Paul Flannery.)	23 August 1982	27 September 2000	18 years, 35 days					
Judge	Kenneth Peter Shadbolt QC	14 March 1983	5 February 2007	23 years, 328 days					
Judge	Edward Alton Mawdsley Nash	20 May 1983	30 July 1997	14 years, 71 days					
Judge	Paul Stein AM	3 June 1983	3 June 1985	2 years, 0 days	Judge of the Land and Environment Court (1985–1997); Judge of Appeal (NSW) (1997–2004)				
Judge	Roger Maxwell Court QC	3 August 1983	25 March 1998	14 years, 234 days					
Judge	Brian Cecil Maclaren Wall QC	3 August 1983	15 February 1996	12 years, 196 days					
Judge	Brian Robert Gallen	26 August 1983	18 December 1995	12 years, 114 days					
Judge	Keith Edward Walsh AM, RFD, ED (Note: Judge Keith Edward Walsh retired in 1990 but was reappointed in 1991.)	9 September 1983	4 May 1990	6 years, 237 days					
Judge	Ronald Herbert Solomon	7 October 1983	16 August 2013	29 years, 313 days					
Judge	Joseph Anthony Moore	18 November 1983	3 August 2001	17 years, 258 days					
Judge	David Sydney Shillington QC	18 June 1984	14 February 2001	16 years, 241 days					
Judge	Jeremy Badgery-Parker QC	31 August 1984	25 July 1989	4 years, 328 days	Judge of the Supreme Court (1989–1998)				
Judge	Geoffrey John Graham	31 August 1984	6 December 2005	21 years, 97 days					
Judge	Margaret Ann O'Toole QC	23 November 1984	31 May 2012	27 years, 190 days	Compensation Court				
Judge	James William Conomos	19 April 1985	19 December 1992	7 years, 244 days					
Judge	Peter Moss QC	1 July 1985	1 May 1988	2 years, 305 days	Judge of the Family Court (1988–2000)				
Judge	John Lloyd-Jones QC	20 December 1985	5 September 1992	6 years, 260 days					
Judge	John Dunford QC	5 August 1986	1 February 1993	6 years, 180 days	Judge of the Supreme Court (1993–2005)				
Judge	David James Freeman	22 September 1986	27 October 2011	25 years, 35 days					
Judge	Neil Abbott Newton	22 September 1986	6 January 1995	8 years, 106 days					
Judge	Rodney Madgwick QC	29 September 1986	19 September 1995	8 years, 355 days	Judge of the Federal Court (1995–2008)				
Judge	Barry Edmund Mahoney QC	7 October 1986	4 May 2001	14 years, 209 days					
Judge	Barrie Richard Kinchington QC	20 October 1986	1 March 2003	16 years, 132 days					
Judge	Joseph Xavier Gibson QC	27 January 1987	18 July 2003	16 years, 172 days					
Judge	William Delbridge Hosking QC	20 July 1987	30 January 2000	12 years, 194 days					
Judge	Joseph Bede Phelan	20 July 1987	24 July 2006	19 years, 4 days					
Judge	David Levine RFD, QC	17 August 1987	10 August 1992	4 years, 359 days	Subsequently appointed a Judge of the Supreme Court				
Judge	Dennis Anthony Wheelahan QC	17 August 1987	30 April 1988	257 days	Subsequently appointed Associate Judge of the District Court of NSW				
Judge	William Harwood Knight	19 August 1987	1 February 2009	21 years, 166 days	Acting Judge of the Supreme Court (November–December 2004)				
Judge	Peter James Phelan	19 August 1987	30 September 1997	10 years, 42 days					
Judge	Leslie Joseph Downs QC	2 February 1988	3 June 1999	11 years, 121 days					
Judge	John Lyndon Jones	2 February 1988	3 May 1991	3 years, 90 days					
Judge	Alan Anthony McDevitt	4 February 1988	22 April 1996	8 years, 78 days					
Judge	Clement Arthur Mitchelmore	4 February 1988	2 April 1999	11 years, 57 days					
Judge	Paul David Urquhart QC	10 May 1988	4 November 2004	16 years, 178 days					
Judge	Hugh Phillip Walmsley Johnston QC	13 May 1988	27 September 2013	25 years, 137 days					
Judge	Donald John McCredie QC	13 May 1988	21 July 1993	5 years, 69 days (Note: Died in office.)					
Judge	Thomas Swanson Davidson QC	16 May 1988	22 July 2001	13 years, 67 days					
Judge	Edward Oscar Guthrie Pain QC	20 May 1988	14 July 1997	9 years, 55 days					
Judge	John Roscoe Nield	30 May 1988	23 September 2009	21 years, 116 days	Acting Judge of the ACT Supreme Court (2010–2011 & 2015–2016)				
Judge	Frederick Angus Kirkham	9 September 1988	26 January 2001	12 years, 139 days					
Judge	Graham Hamlyn Traill Armitage QC	25 October 1989	21 May 2006	16 years, 208 days	Acting judge 2006-2009				
Judge	Peter Rex Grogan	25 October 1988	1 November 1999	11 years, 7 days					
Judge	Anthony Frederick Tolhurst QC	15 November 1989	19 March 1990	124 days					
Judge	Rodney Graeme Craigie RFD, AE QC	7 May 1990	31 October 1997	7 years, 177 days					
Judge	Donald Ernest McLachlan	7 May 1990	17 November 1997	7 years, 194 days					
Judge	Peter John Johns	29 June 1990	5 October 2004	14 years, 98 days	member Dust Diseases Tribunal, Compensation Court				
Judge	Michael Alan Viney QC	24 September 1990	2 October 2000	10 years, 8 days					
Judge	George Richard Rummery QC	30 January 1991	28 November 2000	9 years, 303 days					
Judge	Keith Edward Walsh AM, RFD, ED	1 March 1991	16 July 1992	1 year, 137 days					
Judge	Alan Chapman Saunders QC	15 March 1991	15 April 1996	5 years, 45 days					
Judge	Kenneth Victor Taylor AM, RFD	23 August 1991	11 August 2010	18 years, 353 days					
Judge	Angela Jeanne Stirling Karpin	9 September 1991	11 February 2005	13 years, 155 days					
Judge	Anthony Frederick Garling	20 September 1991	29 June 2012	20 years, 283 days					
Judge	David Louthean Patten	18 March 1992	16 November 2004	12 years, 243 days					
Judge	Philip Adrian Twigg QC	1 April 1992	31 March 2004	11 years, 365 days					
Judge	Peter Dent QC	14 May 1992	28 January 2002	9 years, 259 days					
Judge	John Kevin O'Reilly QC	11 August 1992	13 June 2004	11 years, 307 days					
Judge	Philip Ronald Bell	11 September 1992	1 June 2007	14 years, 263 days					
Judge	Brian William Duck	9 October 1992	9 October 2006	14 years, 0 days	Compensation Court				
Judge	John Holt CBE, QC	7 October 1992	6 May 2001	8 years, 211 days					
Judge	Christopher James Geraghty	27 January 1993	23 September 2009	16 years, 239 days	Compensation Court				
Judge	Peter Evan Coleman QC	2 February 1993	11 August 2003	10 years, 190 days					
Judge	Charles Allan Luland QC	22 February 1993	16 May 2002	9 years, 83 days					
Judge	Brian Ross Maguire QC	6 September 1993	15 December 2006	13 years, 100 days	Compensation Court				
Judge	Alan David Bishop	7 September 1993	17 March 2006	12 years, 191 days	Compensation Court				
Judge	Terence Joseph Christie QC	8 September 1993	11 March 2004	10 years, 185 days					
Judge	Dianne Joy Truss QC	1 November 1993	29 August 2014	20 years, 301 days					
Judge	Cecily Elizabeth Backhouse QC	28 March 1994	27 March 2004	9 years, 365 days					
Judge	Garry William Neilson	2 August 1994		32 years, 106 days	Compensation Court				
Judge	Christopher John Armitage	30 September 1994	6 May 2016	21 years, 219 days	Compensation Court				
Judge	Margaret Sidis	31 January 1995	11 April 2012	17 years, 71 days					
Judge	Christopher John George Robison	13 March 1995		31 years, 248 days					
Judge	Robyn Christine Tupman	30 January 1996		30 years, 290 days					
Judge	Richard William Job QC	12 February 1996	27 September 2000	4 years, 228 days					
Judge	Roderick Howie QC	15 May 1996	6 September 2000	4 years, 114 days	Judge of the Supreme Court (2000–2010)				
Judge	Bob Bellear	17 May 1996	15 March 2005	8 years, 302 days					
Judge	James Patrick Curtis	6 June 1996	14 November 2017	21 years, 161 days	Compensation Court				
Judge	Helen Murrell SC	13 September 1996	28 October 2013	17 years, 45 days	Chief Justice of the Australian Capital Territory (2013–)				
Judge	Deborah June Payne	28 February 1997		29 years, 261 days					
Judge	Martin Langford Sides QC	21 July 1997	24 November 2017	20 years, 126 days					
Judge	Robert Keleman SC	21 July 1997	28 February 2013	15 years, 222 days					
Judge	Anne Mary Quirk	24 July 1997	5 September 2014	17 years, 43 days	Compensation Court				
Judge	Frank Walker QC	25 July 1997	1 June 2006	8 years, 311 days	Compensation Court				
Judge	Ann Ainslie-Wallace	28 July 1997	12 July 2010	12 years, 349 days	Judge of the Family Court (2010–)				
Judge	Terence Fenwick Marley Naughton QC	4 August 1997	16 February 2007	9 years, 196 days					
Judge	Colin Phegan	4 August 1997	13 April 2008	10 years, 253 days					
Judge	Ian John Dodd	29 August 1997	19 July 2005	7 years, 324 days		(Note: The Judicial Commission was conducting an investigation into Judge Ian Dodd however before its report was complete, a medical assessment found Dodd was unfit to work as a judicial officer and he retired on medical grounds.)			
Judge	Linda Margaret Ashford	8 September 1997	15 May 2013	15 years, 249 days	Compensation Court				
Judge	Gregory David Woods QC	21 November 1997	10 February 2017	19 years, 81 days					
Judge	Anthony Francis Puckeridge QC	24 November 1997	28 August 2010	12 years, 277 days					
Judge	Helen Jane Morgan	3 February 1998	18 December 2010	12 years, 318 days					
Judge	John Lester Goldring	3 February 1998	7 October 2009	11 years, 246 days					
Judge	Norman Edward Delaney	4 February 1998	3 July 2014	16 years, 149 days					
Judge	Jonathan Steuart Williams	10 July 1998	28 July 2013	15 years, 18 days					
Judge	Megan Latham	7 August 1998	12 April 2005	6 years, 248 days	Judge of the Supreme Court (2005–2018); Commissioner of Independent Commission Against Corruption (2014–2016)				
Judge	Kevin Patrick O'Connor AM	10 August 1998	30 April 2014	15 years, 263 days					
Judge	Jennifer Anne English	13 August 1998		28 years, 95 days					
Judge	Allan Hughes	9 December 1998	17 November 2010	11 years, 343 days	Compensation Court				
Judge	Susan Jennifer Gibb	15 February 1999		27 years, 274 days					
Judge	Gregory Scott Hosking SC	27 April 1999	1 May 2011	12 years, 4 days					
Judge	Ralph Coolahan	19 July 1999	30 November 2011	12 years, 134 days					
Judge	Kevin Peter Coorey	19 July 1999	29 March 2013	13 years, 253 days					
Judge	Richard Anthony Rolfe	1 February 2000	13 April 2012	12 years, 72 days					
Judge	Derek Price AM	17 February 2000	28 August 2006	6 years, 192 days	Judge of the Supreme Court (2006–), Chief Judge District Court (2014–)				
Judge	James Walter Black QC	8 May 2000	7 February 2013	12 years, 275 days					
Judge	Robert Arthur Sorby	8 May 2000	13 November 2015	15 years, 189 days					
Judge	Stephen Ronald Norrish QC	3 October 2000	22 May 2021	20 years, 231 days	Acting Judge of the Supreme Court 7 Jul to 29 Aug 2008				
Judge	Audrey Suzanne Balla	3 October 2000	28 January 2019	18 years, 117 days	Acting Judge of the ACT Supreme Court (2019– )				
Judge	Michael John Finnane RFD, QC	20 October 2000	20 February 2015	14 years, 123 days					
Judge	Penelope Jane Hock	7 May 2001		25 years, 193 days					
Judge	Judith Clare Gibson	21 May 2001		25 years, 179 days					
Judge	John Cecil Nicholson QC	23 July 2001	29 June 2012	10 years, 342 days					
Judge	Stephen Walmsley QC	27 August 2001	27 September 2013	12 years, 31 days	Acting Judge of the ACT Supreme Court (2014– )				
Judge	Nigel Rein SC	4 March 2002	4 May 2008	6 years, 61 days	Acting Judge of the Supreme Court (January–March 2008); Judge of the Supreme Court (2008–)				
Judge	Anthony Martin Blackmore SC	11 March 2002	20 April 2020	18 years, 40 days					
Judge	Colin Emmett O'Connor QC	24 June 2002	29 June 2012	10 years, 5 days					
Judge	Peter Graeme Berman SC	13 September 2002	28 January 2019	16 years, 137 days	Acting Judge of the ACT Supreme Court (2019– )				
Judge	Raymond Patrick McLoughlin SC	17 February 2003	15 March 2017	14 years, 26 days					
Judge	Colin David Charteris SC	17 February 2003	3 September 2015	12 years, 198 days					
Judge	Roy David Ellis	11 August 2003		23 years, 97 days					
Judge	Mark Curtis Marien SC	3 February 2004	2 February 2014	9 years, 364 days					
Judge	Brian John Knox SC	14 February 2005	29 July 2016	11 years, 166 days					
Judge	Brian Harrie Kevin Donovan QC	11 April 2005	6 May 2008	3 years, 25 days					
Judge	Robert Allan Hulme SC	4 May 2005	2 March 2009	3 years, 302 days	Acting Judge of the Supreme Court (November–December 2008); Judge of the Supreme Court (2009–)				
Judge	John Roger Dive	27 July 2005	6 August 2021	16 years, 10 days	Senior Judge, Drug Court of New South Wales (2005–)				
Judge	Deborah Anne Sweeney	21 April 2006	8 February 2023	16 years, 293 days	Judge of the Supreme Court (2023–)				
Judge	James Leonard Alexander Bennett SC	1 May 2006		20 years, 199 days					
Judge	Peter Lind Johnstone	1 May 2006		20 years, 199 days	President, Children's Court (2012–2021); Chief Magistrate Local Court (2021–)				
Judge	William Patrick Kearns SC	11 July 2006	15 May 2018	11 years, 308 days					
Judge	Paul Vincent Conlon SC	15 August 2006	28 January 2018	11 years, 166 days					
Judge	Peter Raymond Zahra SC	30 January 2007	8 May 2022	15 years, 98 days	Suffered a stroke on 5 May and died a few days later				
Judge	Richard Dominic Cogswell SC	6 February 2007	26 May 2019	12 years, 109 days	President Mental Health Review Tribunal of New South Wales (2015-2019)				
Judge	Leonie Flannery SC	20 March 2007		19 years, 241 days					
Judge	Robert Stephen Toner SC	16 April 2007	3 February 2018	10 years, 293 days					
Judge	Gregory Michael Keating SC	5 November 2007	7 December 2018	11 years, 32 days					
Judge	Paul Ivan Lakatos SC	30 January 2008		18 years, 290 days	President Mental Health Review Tribunal of New South Wales (2019-)				
Judge	Leonard Ari Levy SC	15 May 2008		18 years, 185 days					
Judge	Michael Elkaim SC	15 May 2008	4 July 2016	8 years, 50 days	Judge of the ACT Supreme Court (2016–)				
Judge	Michael John King SC	17 June 2008		18 years, 152 days					
Judge	David Clement Frearson SC	2 March 2009	13 April 2019	10 years, 42 days					
Judge	Andrew Michael Colefax SC	14 April 2009		17 years, 216 days					
Judge	Helen Lorraine Syme	14 April 2009	20 December 2021	12 years, 250 days					
Judge	Michael Ivan Bozic SC	20 July 2009	2 February 2020	10 years, 197 days					
Judge	John Frederick Stuart North	29 July 2009		17 years, 110 days					
Judge	Graham Leslie Henson AM	20 July 2010	27 August 2021	11 years, 38 days	Chief Magistrate Local Court (2010–)				
Judge	Laura Kathleen Wells SC	27 July 2010	16 August 2020	10 years, 20 days					
Judge	Ross Victor Letherbarrow SC	11 August 2010	March 2021	10 years, 232 days					
Judge	Andrew Carl Haesler SC	20 September 2010		16 years, 57 days					
Judge	Donna Mary Lisa Woodburne SC	7 February 2011		15 years, 282 days					
Judge	Elizabeth Margaret Olsson SC	7 March 2011		15 years, 254 days					
Judge	Clive Vaughan Jeffreys	15 March 2011		15 years, 246 days					
Judge	David Ulric Arnott SC	13 February 2012		14 years, 276 days					
Judge	Peter George Maiden SC	12 March 2012	11 June 2019	7 years, 121 days					
Judge	Phillip Gregory Mahony SC	19 March 2012		14 years, 242 days					
Judge	Christopher Phillip Hoy SC	16 April 2012		14 years, 214 days					
Judge	Phillip Thomas Taylor SC	16 April 2012		14 years, 214 days					
Judge	Gordon Bruce Lerve	31 May 2012		14 years, 169 days					
Judge	Ian Hartley McClintock SC	24 September 2012		14 years, 53 days					
Judge	Christopher Bruce Craigie SC	15 October 2012		14 years, 32 days					
Judge	Sarah Jane Huggett	15 October 2012		14 years, 32 days					
Judge	Antony Edward Townsden	6 May 2013		13 years, 194 days					
Judge	Peter Raymond Whitford SC	24 June 2013		13 years, 145 days					
Judge	Stephen Scott Hanley SC	15 July 2013		13 years, 124 days					
Judge	Sharron Norton SC	16 September 2013		13 years, 61 days					
Judge	Mark Lloyd Williams SC	23 September 2013		13 years, 54 days					
Judge	Helen Wilson SC	28 April 2014	3 November 2014	189 days	Judge of the Supreme Court (2014–)				
Judge	Dina Yehia SC	5 May 2014		12 years, 195 days					
Judge	Julia Ann Baly SC	1 September 2014		12 years, 76 days					
Judge	John Hatzistergos SC	16 October 2014		12 years, 31 days	Attorney General (2007–2011); Chief Commissioner of the Independent Commission Against Corruption (2022–2027)				
Judge	Jane Ariane Culver	29 October 2014		12 years, 18 days					
Judge	Andrew Craig Scotting	17 February 2015		11 years, 272 days					
Judge	Jennie Anne Girdham SC	17 August 2015		11 years, 91 days					
Judge	Catherine Margaret Traill	17 August 2015		11 years, 91 days					
Judge	Gregory Anthony Farmer SC	7 September 2015	22 August 2016	350 days					
Judge	Mark Buscombe	19 November 2015		10 years, 362 days					
Judge	John Hunter Pickering SC	11 April 2016		10 years, 219 days					
Judge	Siobhan Pauline Herbert	11 April 2016		10 years, 219 days					
Judge	Penelope Margot Wass SC	18 April 2016		10 years, 212 days					
Judge	Robert Edward Montgomery	30 May 2016		10 years, 170 days					
Judge	Matthew Charles Leckie Dicker SC	12 July 2016		10 years, 127 days					
Judge	Nicole Frances Noman SC	8 August 2016		10 years, 100 days					
Judge	Warwick James Hunt	8 August 2016		10 years, 100 days					
Judge	Robert Forbes Sutherland SC	15 August 2016		10 years, 93 days					
Judge	Phillip Gerard Ingram SC	15 August 2016		10 years, 93 days					
Judge	Jeffrey Mark McLennan SC	22 August 2016		10 years, 86 days					
Judge	Tanya Anne Bright	31 January 2017		9 years, 289 days					
Judge	David Michael Wilson SC	3 April 2017		9 years, 227 days					
Judge	David John Russell SC	24 May 2017		9 years, 176 days					
Judge	Timothy Hans Gartelmann SC	3 October 2017		9 years, 44 days					
Judge	Gina Maree O'Rourke	30 January 2018		8 years, 290 days					
Judge	Christopher Gerard O'Brien	9 April 2018		8 years, 221 days	Deputy Chief Magistrate Local Court (2014–2018)				
Judge	Wendy Sue Strathdee	22 May 2018		8 years, 178 days					
Judge	Gerard Mark Phillips SC	23 January 2019		7 years, 297 days	President, Workers Compensation Commission of New South Wales (2019–)				
Judge	Ian David Bourke SC	4 February 2019		7 years, 285 days					
Judge	Jonathon James Priestley SC (Note: Jonathon Priestley is the son of Bill Priestley a former Judge of Appeal (NSW).)	4 February 2019		7 years, 285 days					
Judge	Robert John Weber SC	7 February 2019		7 years, 282 days					
Judge	Kara Natalie Shead SC	7 February 2019		7 years, 282 days					
Judge	Walter Graham Turnbull SC	11 February 2019		7 years, 278 days					
Judge	Richard Howard Weinstein SC	11 February 2019	1 February 2023	3 years, 355 days	Judge of the Supreme Court (2023–)				
Judge	Nanette Lee Williams	14 February 2019		7 years, 275 days					
Judge	Sean Elwin Grant	14 February 2019		7 years, 275 days					
Judge	Sharon Harris	18 February 2019		7 years, 271 days					
Judge	Justin Dupont Smith SC	18 February 2019		7 years, 271 days	Judge of the Federal Circuit Court (2015–2019)				
Judge	Alister Abadee	21 February 2019		7 years, 268 days					
Judge	Susanne Denise Cole	28 February 2019		7 years, 261 days	Judge of the District Court (SA) (2002–2019); Deputy President, NSW Civil and Administrative Tribunal (2019–)				
Judge	Sophia Frances Beckett	30 September 2019		7 years, 47 days					
Judge	Craig John Gordon Smith SC	8 March 2021		5 years, 253 days					
Judge	Andrew Phillip Coleman SC	15 March 2021		5 years, 246 days					
Judge	Tanya Louise Smith SC	29 March 2021		5 years, 232 days					
Judge	Karen Elizabeth Robinson	15 June 2021		5 years, 154 days					
Judge	Jane Ellen Mottley AM	9 August 2021		5 years, 69 days	Senior Judge, Drug Court of New South Wales (2021–)				
Judge	Ellen Skinner	22 November 2021		4 years, 359 days	President of the Children's Court of New South Wales (2021–)				
Judge	Peter John McGrath SC	7 February 2022		4 years, 282 days					
Judge	Penelope Mary Musgrave	10 February 2022		4 years, 279 days					
Judge	Huw Baker SC	21 July 2022		4 years, 118 days					
Judge	William Markey Fitzsimmons SC	28 July 2022		4 years, 111 days					
Judge	Pauline Ann David	1 August 2022		4 years, 107 days					
Judge	McHugh Michael SC	7 October 2022		4 years, 40 days					
Judge	Georgia Lea Turner	12 October 2022		4 years, 35 days					
Judge	Kevin Leo Andronos SC	24 October 2022		4 years, 23 days					
Judge	Sarah Conant Hopkins	2 February 2023		3 years, 287 days					
Judge	Lara Margaret Gallagher	16 February 2023		3 years, 273 days					
Judge	Michael Gerard Allen	27 February 2023		3 years, 262 days	Deputy Chief Magistrate Local Court (2018–2023)				
McGuire Paul SC	7 August 2023		1 year, 132 days -	Acting judge	Arthur Holroyd	30 January 1860	31 December 1860	336 days	Master of the Supreme Court (1866s–1885)
Henry Wilfred Ellis	June 1867	December 1867	<1 year	Acting judge					
Henry Cohen	31 May 1881	28 April 1882	332 days	Acting judge	Acting Judge of the Supreme Court (1895–1896); Judge of the Supreme Court (1896–1912)				
Charles Cansdell	1882	1883	0–1 years	Acting judge					
Alexander Gerard Ralston KC	1 February 1894; 1 February 1905; 15 July 1907; 1 October 1920	26 February 1894; 31 March 1905; 26 July 1907; 20 November 1920	25 days 58 days 11 days 50 days	Acting judge	Acting Judge of the Supreme Court (1919, 1920, 1922–1925)				
Sir Charles Wade KCMG	14 November 1896	1902	5–6 years	Acting judge	Attorney General (1904–1910); Premier (1907–1910); Judge of the Supreme Court (1920–1922)				
Francis Stewart Boyce	16 October 1916	14 July 1917	271 days	Acting judge	Acting Judge of the Supreme Court (1932); Judge of the Supreme Court (1932–1940)				
Victor Maxwell (Note: Victor Maxwell (1887-1975) was the father of Supreme Court judge Victor Maxwell (1922-1997).)	27 February 1928; 23 July 1928	11 March 1928; 31 August 1928	13 days 39 days	Acting judge	Acting Judge of the Supreme Court (1929–1930 & 1934); Judge of the Supreme Court (1934–1956)				
Keith Ferguson	7 June 1933	30 June 1933	23 days	Acting judge	Acting Judge of the Supreme Court (1941); Judge of the Supreme Court (1955–1965)				
Sir Leslie Herron KBE CMG KStJ KC	1 February 1939	9 February 1941	2 years, 8 days	Acting judge	Judge of the Supreme Court, (1941–1972); Chief Justice of NSW (1962–1972); Governor of NSW (1973)				
Hugh Maguire	1 January 1947	31 December 1947	364 days	Acting judge	Acting Judge of the Supreme Court (1953); Judge of the Supreme Court (1953–1973)				
Margaret Beazley AO	1990	1991	0–1 years	Acting judge	Assistant Commissioner Independent Commission Against Corruption (1991–1992); Judge of the Federal Court (1993–1996); Judge of Appeal (NSW) (1996–2019) President, Court of Appeal (2013–2019); Governor of NSW (2019–)				
Peter McClellan AM	1998	2001	2–3 years	Acting judge	Judge of the Supreme Court				
Bill Fisher AO, QC	1 July 1998	11 April 2002	3 years, 284 days	Acting judge	Judge of the Supreme Court (1979–1981); President Industrial Commission of NSW (1981–1998)				
Calvin Callaway QC	1 February 1988	2 January 1990	1 year, 335 days	Acting judge	Acting Judge of the Supreme Court (1989, 1990 & 1997)				
Nicholas Cowdery QC	1988	31 December 1990	2 years, 333 days	Acting judge	Director of Public Prosecutions (1994–2011)				
Greg James	1988	1990	1–2 years	Acting judge	Judge of the Supreme Court (1998–2005)				
David Kirby (Note: David Kirby is the younger brother of Michael Kirby.)	1988	1989	0–1 years	Acting judge	Judge of the Supreme Court (1998–2011)				
