= List of New South Wales courts and tribunals =

The following is a list of courts and tribunals in New South Wales:

== List of sitting boards, commissions, courts, and tribunals ==
=== Sitting courts ===
The primary courts currently sitting in New South Wales are:

- Court of Appeal of New South Wales
- Court of Criminal Appeal of New South Wales
- Supreme Court of New South Wales
- Land and Environment Court of New South Wales
- District Court of New South Wales
- Local Court of New South Wales

Additional, specialist courts include:

- Chief Industrial Magistrate's Court
- Children's Court of New South Wales
- Children's Court Clinic
- Coroner's Court of New South Wales
- Court of Disputed Returns of New South Wales
- Court of Marine Inquiry of New South Wales
- Drug Court of New South Wales
- Warden Court
- Youth Drug and Alcohol Court of New South Wales
- Youth Koori Court

=== Sitting tribunals ===
- Dust Diseases Tribunal of New South Wales
- Government and Related Employees Tribunal of New South Wales
- Independent Pricing and Regulatory Tribunal of New South Wales
- Marine Appeal Tribunal
- Mental Health Review Tribunal of New South Wales
- New South Wales Civil and Administrative Tribunal

=== Sitting boards and councils ===
- New South Wales Sentencing Council
- Transport Appeal Boards of New South Wales

=== Sitting commissions ===
- Independent Commission Against Corruption
- Industrial Relations Commission of New South Wales
- Judicial Commission of New South Wales
- Workers Compensation Commission of New South Wales

== List of abolished boards, courts and tribunals ==
=== Abolished boards ===
- Coal Compensation Board of New South Wales
- Local Land Boards

=== Abolished courts ===
- Compensation Court of New South Wales (1984–2004)
- Court of Arbitration (New South Wales) (1902–1908)
- Court of Industrial Arbitration of New South Wales (1912–1926)
- Court of Civil Jurisdiction (1787–1814)
- Court of Coal Mines Regulation of New South Wales (1984–2006)
- Court of Criminal Jurisdiction (1787–1823)
- Governors Court (1814–1823)
- Industrial Court of New South Wales (1908–1912)
- Industrial Court of New South Wales (1996–2016)
- Lieutenant Governor's Court (Van Dieman's Land) (1814–1823)
- Land and Valuation Court of New South Wales (1921–1979)
- Supreme Court of Civil Judicature (1814–1824)
- Supreme Court of New South Wales for the District of Port Phillip (1840–1852)
- Vice Admiralty Court (New South Wales) (1823–1970)
- Warden's Court (1874–2009)
- Youth Drug and Alcohol Court of New South Wales (2000–2012)

=== Abolished tribunals ===
- Aboriginal and Torres Strait Islander Health Practice Tribunal
- Aboriginal Land Councils Pecuniary Interest and Disciplinary Tribunal
- Administrative Decisions Tribunal of New South Wales
- Charity Referees
- Chinese Medicine Tribunal
- Chiropractic Tribunal
- Coal Compensation Review Tribunal of New South Wales
- Community Services Appeals Tribunal
- Compensation Court of New South Wales
- Consumer, Trader and Tenancy Tribunal of New South Wales
- Dental Tribunal
- Fair Trading Tribunal of New South Wales
- Gaming Tribunal of New South Wales
- Government and Related Employees Appeals Tribunal of New South Wales
- Guardianship Tribunal of New South Wales
- Local Government Pecuniary Interest Tribunal of New South Wales
- Marine Appeal Tribunal
- Medical Radiation Practice Tribunal
- Medical Tribunal of New South Wales
- Nursing and Midwifery Tribunal
- Occupational Therapy Tribunal
- Optometry Tribunal
- Osteopathy Tribunal
- Pharmacy Tribunal
- Physiotherapy Tribunal
- Podiatry Tribunal
- Police Tribunal of New South Wales
- Psychology Tribunal
- Residential Tribunal of New South Wales
- Victims Compensation Tribunal of New South Wales
- Vocational Training Appeals Panel
