= Dust Diseases Tribunal of New South Wales =

- Established: 21 July 1989
- Jurisdiction: New South Wales, Australia
- Location: Sydney, New South Wales
- Composition method: Vice-regal appointment on the Premier's nomination, following advice of the Attorney- General and Cabinet
- Authorised by: Parliament of New South Wales via the Dust Diseases Tribunal Act 1989 (NSW)
- Appeals to: Court of Appeal of New South Wales
- Website: dustdiseasestribunal.justice.nsw.gov.au

President of the Dust Diseases Tribunal of NSW
- Currently: Justice Sarah Huggett

The Dust Diseases Tribunal of New South Wales was established on 21 July 1989 as a specialist court within the Australian court hierarchy with exclusive jurisdiction within New South Wales, Australia, to deal with claims for damages from sufferers of dust-related illnesses, including those linked to asbestos exposure, and from dependants of sufferers who have died. The tribunal is located in the John Maddison Tower in the Sydney central business district.

== History ==
The tribunal was established to provide a specialist jurisdiction to deal quickly and compassionately with victims of dust-related injuries. Dust diseases affect the respiratory system and may take up to thirty years to become manifest. However, once a disease takes hold, sufferers usually need to have their case heard quickly. Prior to the establishment of the tribunal, claims for dust related diseases were heard in the Supreme Court of New South Wales and the District Court of New South Wales. Following representations made by various trade unions to the New South Wales Parliament that many members were dying before their claims were heard, the tribunal was established. The first president was John Lawrence O'Meally (AM RFD). The first case was heard in the tribunal on 1 November 1989.

== Jurisdiction ==
The tribunal was established pursuant to the Dust Diseases Tribunal Act 1989 (NSW) as an inferior court and a court of record. An appeal may lie to the Court of Appeal of New South Wales in certain circumstances. It has exclusive jurisdiction to deal with claims for injuries arising out of the diseases such as aluminosis, asbestosis, asbestos induced carcinoma, asbestos related pleural disease, bagassosis, berylliosis, byssinosis, coal dust pneumoconiosis, farmers’ lung, hard metal pneumoconiosis, pleural and peritoneal mesothelioma, silicosis, silico-tuberculosis and talcosis. It also has jurisdiction over any other pathological condition of the lungs, pleura or peritoneum that is attributable to dust. In certain circumstances, dependents may also sue in the tribunal.

There is a President of the tribunal appointed by the Governor of New South Wales. The governor may also appoint judges of the District Court of New South Wales to be members of the tribunal. There are currently four permanent members and a number of acting members. There is also a registrar and administrative support staff. Prior to the abolition of the Compensation Court of New South Wales, the governor could only appoint a judge of the Compensation Court as a member of the tribunal.

== Presidents and members ==
The current president is the Honourable Justice Sarah Huggett.

== See also ==
- List of New South Wales courts and tribunals
