= Police Tribunal of New South Wales =

- Established: 1990
- Dissolved: 1998
- Jurisdiction: New South Wales
- Composition method: Vice-regal appointment upon nomination by the Premier following the advice of the Attorney General and Cabinet
- Appeals to: Government and Related Employees Tribunal of New South Wales

The Police Tribunal of New South Wales was a tribunal established in New South Wales, a state of Australia to deal with allegations of misconduct by New South Wales Police. It was established in 1990 and abolished in 1998.

== Constitution ==
The first tribunal was established under Part 9A of the Police Act, 1990.

The tribunal was continued in existence under amendments made by Police Service (Complaints, Discipline and Appeals) Amendment Act, 1993. The tribunal was re-established as court of record.

The Governor of New South Wales could appoint a president or a deputy president of the tribunal. The president or the deputy president could either be a judge of the Supreme Court of New South Wales, the Industrial Relations Commission of New South Wales, the District Court of New South Wales or the senior chairperson of the Government and Related Employees Tribunal of New South Wales. Every judge of the District Court was automatically a member of the tribunal.

The only president of the tribunal was Justice Jim Staunton.

== Jurisdiction ==
The tribunal had a number of jurisdictions. Firstly, it could deal with a reference from the Attorney General of New South Wales. When this occurred, the tribunal became effectively an inquiry having all the powers of a royal commission. As with all royal commissions, it functions were to penetrate factual situations which otherwise might not be penetrated using traditional legal processes, so the tribunal can report its findings direct to the New South Wales Parliament.

Being an inquiry it was not subject to the procedural and evidentiary restraints of normal judicial proceeding. It was inquisitorial and there were no parties. The member conducting the inquiry had the responsibility and the power to inform themselves of relevant matters by resort to such evidentiary material and in such ways and by such procedures as appeared to be appropriate, subject to the rules of nature justice.

Another jurisdiction of the tribunal was to deal with disciplinary matters where the police officer denied the charges. In this case, the tribunal was constituted by a single member.

The tribunal could determine the guilt and recommend a penalty to the Minister for Police or the Commissioner of Police. Either person could use that recommendation as the basis for a recommendation to the governor. In certain situations, a police officer could lodge a further appeal on the severity of the sentence to the Government and Related Employees Tribunal of New South Wales.

A person unhappy with the decision of the tribunal could appeal to the Appeal Division of the tribunal. This division was constituted by the president and two members of the tribunal.

== Abolition ==
The tribunal was abolished in 1998. Its powers were taken over by the Police Integrity Commission following the Wood Royal Commission into the New South Wales Police Service. The tribunal's powers in respect of appeals on disciplinary matters was taken over by Government and Related Employees Tribunal of New South Wales or was merged into the day-to-day management functions of the police commissioner.
