= Chief Industrial Magistrate's Court =

- Established: 1912
- Jurisdiction: New South Wales, Australia
- Authorised by: Parliament of New South Wales via the Industrial Relations Act 1996 (NSW)
- Appeals to: Industrial Court of New South Wales
- Website: www.localcourt.justice.nsw.gov.au

Chief Magistrate
- Currently: Judge Graeme Henson
- Since: 2006

The Chief Industrial Magistrate's Court of New South Wales, a division of the Local Court of New South Wales, is a court within the Australian court hierarchy established pursuant to the Industrial Relations Act 1996 (NSW).

The Local Court is the lowest court in the court hierarchy in New South Wales, Australia. The Court deals with the majority of civil and criminal disputes in the State. The role of industrial magistrate allows certain magistrates to deal exclusively with and specialise in certain types of industrial matters in New South Wales including matters covered by both New South Wales and Commonwealth legislation.

Magistrates have been a part of the New South Wales industrial system since the early days of the British colony established in 1788. The first officially appointed Chief Industrial Magistrate was appointed in 1912. Chief Industrial Magistrates have continued to be appointed since that year, and currently, the industrial work of the court is carried out principally by that magistrate, although other magistrates are appointed as Industrial Magistrates on a needs basis.

== History ==
The role of the justice of the peace regulating the master and servant relation has been a long-standing one in the English common law tradition. This role was carried over into the administration of justice from the early days of the penal settlement established by the British in Port Jackson (now Sydney) in the colony of New South Wales. Employment in the 1900s was regulated using the common law concepts of contract. These concepts provided that an employer and employee were free to bargain as to the nature and the terms of employment. Where either party breached the contract, there was recourse to the law in the normal courts of the land.

In certain situations, it was possible under various “Master and Servant Acts” for employees or employers who broke employment contracts to be prosecuted for a breach of the criminal law. More commonly, this was directed at employees, particularly as wealthier employers would also be the local justice of the peace for the locality. Dr Geoffrey Partington outlines an example in 1858 where German masons who were brought to Australia to work on the Victorian railways. The employees broke their contracts after being persuaded to work for another employer. This was due to a shortage in the supply of experienced masons in Australia. The masons were imprisoned as a result of their breach of contract.

The growing maturity of the New South Wales colony led to the employment of permanent paid magistrates. These magistrates were first employed in Sydney Town. However, they gradually replaced all local justices of the peace. Magistrates would in time come to be appointed specially to either being a stipendiary magistrate, children's magistrate, or an industrial magistrate. Industrial magistrates appear to have been first used in New South Wales around 1912. Their authority came from the then Industrial Relations Act 1912 (NSW). A Chief Industrial Magistrate was also appointed, although there was no statutory basis for doing so. The first statutorily appointed one was not until 1986.

Up until 1991, all magistrates were also gazetted as industrial magistrates. The process of gazetting is simply to give a magistrate a dual role or appointment. From 1991, magistrates were automatically appointed as an industrial magistrate under the Industrial Relations Act 1991. In practice, however, all work of an industrial nature was performed by the Chief Industrial Magistrate. In 1996, a new Industrial Act was passed. Under this law, magistrates are now only appointed on a needs basis to assist the Chief Industrial Magistrate in his or her duties.

== Jurisdiction ==
The chief industrial magistrate is appointed by the Governor of New South Wales under section 381 of the Industrial Relations Act 1996. The Governor may also appoint other magistrates to be industrial magistrates under section 381. The person must already hold an appointment of a magistrate in the Local Court of New South Wales before being appointed. The person loses the appointment of chief industrial magistrate or industrial magistrate once they cease to be a magistrate. Holding an appointment as the Chief Industrial Magistrate or as an Industrial Magistrate does not prevent that person from dealing with normal cases in the Local Court, and the person may sit as a coroner or as a children's magistrate if they hold such an appointment.

When considering industrial cases, the industrial magistrate actually constitutes a Local Court rather than a specialised industrial court. Industrial magistrates have both criminal and civil jurisdictions. All the usual laws apply to proceedings in the court. However, in civil proceedings, the procedure of the court is regulated by the Industrial Relations Act rather than the Civil Procedure Act 2005. Certain types of cases may only be dealt with by industrial magistrates. These are cases under the following laws:

- Apprenticeship and Traineeship Act 2001 (NSW)
- Building and Construction Industry Long Service Payments Act 1986 (NSW)
- Entertainment Industry Act 2013 (NSW)
- Essential Services Act 1988 (NSW)
- Industrial Relations (Child Employment) Act 2006 (NSW)
- Industrial Relations (Ethical Clothing Trades) Act 2001 (NSW)
- Industrial Relations Act 1996 (NSW)
- Occupational Health and Safety Act 2000
- Shops and Industries Act 1962
- Workers Compensation Act 1987 (NSW)
- Workplace Injury Management and Workers Compensation Act 1998 (NSW)

Other laws, including federal laws, may empower an Industrial Magistrate to deal with cases. For example, the Australian Government gave power to Industrial Magistrates to deal with matters under the Workplace Relations Act 1996 (Cth) through the now repealed section 177A. Generally, criminal proceedings are restricted to breaches of safety regulations (for example under the Occupational Health and Safety Act). Civil proceedings are generally restricted to the recovery of unpaid wages or leave by employees against employers. Where the court makes an order in this type of case, the amount of money awarded must be registered and enforced in the Local Court rather than through an Industrial Court.

== Appeals ==
Appeals from criminal decisions of the court are dealt with in the same manner as appeals from criminal decisions of the Local Court. However, unlike normal criminal cases, appeals go to the Industrial Court of New South Wales rather than the Supreme Court of New South Wales or the District Court of New South Wales. In civil matters, there is a right of appeal to the Industrial Court as well. This is a full right of appeal unlike the usual civil proceedings appeals which are limited to a point of law.

== Prominent cases ==
In 1955, the then Chief Industrial Magistrate, Harry Isles, dealt with a claim by Frank Lambeth, a waiter sacked by prominent Sydney identify and businessman Abe Saffron. Lambeth had been employed at a restaurant run by a company owned by Saffron. Lambeth was sacked after giving evidence against the company supporting a claim that it had not paid a certain debt. Lambeth succeeded before the Chief Industrial Magistrate and was awarded 240 pounds. In 2001, the court dealt with the first ever Australian case in which a bank had been prosecuted for failing to make its premises safe for employees from bank robberies. The case involved an armed-holdup at the Wellington branch of the bank on 24 August 1999. The Chief Magistrate, George Miller, found that the bank had failed to conduct a risk assessment of the bank branch following union concerns about its safety. A fine of $25,000 was imposed following the bank's guilty plea and tha [sic] the bank had learned from the incident.

In 2002 the court heard a case in which an employee fell off a stage prop he was constructing for the Italian Opera Rinalda at the Sydney Opera House. The employee fell off the 3-metre-high (9.8 ft) mountain prop he was constructing. Following the incident, a crane and harness was obtained for future prop building. In 2004, the court heard a case of bullying and harassment in the workplace. It was alleged that a new employee underwent an initiation ceremony that involved the employee being wrapped in cling film from neck to ankle, strapped to a trolley and then spun around. The employee's mouth was then stuffed with sawdust and glue and then finally he was sprayed in the face with a firehose. The company concerned was fined $15,000 for the incident.

== See also ==
- List of New South Wales courts and tribunals
