= New South Wales Court of Appeal =

Appellate court for New South Wales

- Interactive map of New South Wales Court of Appeal
- 33°52′08″S 151°12′42″E
- Established: 1 January 1966
- Jurisdiction: New South Wales
- Location: Sydney
- Coordinates: 33°52′08″S 151°12′42″E
- Composition method: Vice-regal appointment upon Premier's nomination, following advice of the Attorney General and Cabinet
- Authorised by: Parliament of New South Wales via the: Constitution Act 1902 (NSW); Supreme Court Act 1970 (NSW)
- Appeals to: High Court of Australia
- Appeals from: Supreme Court of New South Wales; Industrial Court of NSW; Land and Environment Court of NSW; District Court of NSW; Dust Diseases Tribunal of NSW; Workers Compensation Commission of NSW; Government and Related Employees Appeal Tribunal of NSW
- Judge term length: Mandatory retirement by age of 75
- Website: supremecourt.nsw.gov.au

Chief Justice of New South Wales
- Currently: Justice Andrew Bell
- Since: 7 March 2022

President of the Court of Appeal
- Currently: Justice Julie Ward
- Since: 7 March 2022

The New South Wales Court of Appeal, part of the Supreme Court of New South Wales, is the highest court for civil matters and has appellate jurisdiction in the Australian state of New South Wales.

== Jurisdiction ==
The Court of Appeal operates pursuant to the Supreme Court Act 1970 (NSW). The Court hears appeals from a variety of courts and tribunals in New South Wales, in particular the Supreme Court, the Industrial Court, the Land and Environment Court, the District Court, the Dust Diseases Tribunal, the Workers Compensation Commission, and the Government and Related Employees Appeal Tribunal. The Court of Appeal must grant leave to appeal a judgment of an inferior court, before it hears the appeal proper.

If a petitioner is not satisfied with the decision made by the Court of Appeal, application may be made to the High Court of Australia for special leave to appeal the decision before the High Court. Because special leave is only granted by the High Court under certain conditions, the Court of Appeal is in effect a court of final appeal for many matters.

== History ==
The Court of Appeal was established in 1965, replacing the former appellate Full Court of the New South Wales Supreme Court, and commenced operations on 1 January 1966 with the appointment of the President, Sir Gordon Wallace, and six Judges of Appeal, Bernard Sugerman, Charles McLelland, Cyril Walsh, Kenneth Jacobs, Kenneth Asprey and John Holmes Dashwood. The advent of the Court of Appeal was controversial, as it introduced another order and unexpectedly uprooted the established order of hierarchy and seniority among judges of the Supreme Court.

== Current composition ==
The Court of Appeal, as of March 2024, consists of the Chief Justice of New South Wales, the President of the Court of Appeal, and the judges of appeal. Apart from the Chief Justice and the President of the Court, there are nine judges of appeal with current commissions.

Traditionally these judges of appeal include the head of the Supreme Court's Common Law Division and the head of its Equity Division, judges (sometimes style chief judges) who sit for the most part in those Divisions as 'primary' judges. The Chief Judge at Common Law is currently Ian Harrison, while the Chief Judge in Equity is currently David Hammerschlag. The chief judges will on occasion sit as appeal judges from time to time.

The Governor can also appoint Acting Judges of Appeal. They have all rights and powers as a Judge of Appeal. There are presently two acting judges of appeal, John Griffiths and Derek Price. Each sit full-time in the Court of Appeal, although will hear primary cases in the Divisions as the need arises.

Name	Title	Term began	Time in office	Notes
Andrew Bell	Chief Justice	7 March 2022	4 years, 231 days	
Julie Ward	President, Court of Appeal	7 March 2022	4 years, 231 days	
Mark Leeming	Judge of Appeal	3 June 2013	13 years, 143 days	
Anthony Payne	Judge of Appeal	30 March 2016	10 years, 208 days	
Anna Mitchelmore	Judge of Appeal	28 March 2022	4 years, 210 days	
Jeremy Kirk	Judge of Appeal	21 April 2022	4 years, 186 days	
Christine Adamson	Judge of Appeal	3 February 2023	3 years, 263 days	
Kristina Stern	Judge of Appeal	8 June 2023	3 years, 138 days	
Richard McHugh	Judge of Appeal	20 August 2024	2 years, 65 days	
Michael Ball	Judge of Appeal	4 November 2024	1 year, 354 days	
Stephen Free	Judge of Appeal	12 May 2025	1 year, 165 days	
Ian Harrison	Chief Judge at Common Law	9 November 2023	2 years, 349 days	
David Hammerschlag	Chief Judge in Equity	17 March 2022	4 years, 221 days	
John Griffiths	Acting Judge of Appeal	10 April 2022	4 years, 197 days	
Derek Price	Acting Judge of Appeal	1 June 2024	2 years, 145 days	

Most judges in the Court of Appeal also sit on the Court of Criminal Appeal in varying degrees of frequency. The Chief Judge at Common Law and the Chief Judge in Equity also sit on the Court of Appeal (and the Court of Criminal Appeal) from time to time.

== Presidents of the Court of Appeal ==
Name	Appointment commenced	Appointment ended	Term as President	Comments	Notes
Sir Gordon Wallace	1 January 1966	21 January 1970	4 years, 20 days	Retired	
Sir Bernard Sugerman	2 January 1970	30 September 1972	2 years, 252 days	Retired	
Sir Kenneth Jacobs KBE	1 October 1972	7 February 1974	1 year, 129 days	Appointed to the High Court	
Athol Moffitt CMG	8 February 1974	25 June 1984	10 years, 138 days	Retired	
Michael Kirby AC CMG	24 September 1984	6 February 1996	11 years, 135 days	Appointed to the High Court	
Dennis Mahoney AO	19 February 1996	3 February 1997	350 days	Retired.	
Keith Mason AC	4 February 1997	30 May 2008	11 years, 183 days	Retired	
James Allsop AO	1 June 2008	28 February 2013	4 years, 272 days	Appointed Chief Justice of the Federal Court	
Margaret Beazley AO	1 March 2013	27 February 2019	5 years, 363 days	Appointed Governor of NSW	
Andrew Bell	28 February 2019	7 March 2022	3 years, 7 days	Appointed Chief Justice of New South Wales	
Julie Ward	7 March 2022		4 years, 231 days		

== See also ==
- List of New South Wales courts and tribunals
- List of judges of appeal of the NSW Court of Appeal
