= New South Wales v Fahy =

Judgement of the High Court of Australia

- Court: High Court of Australia
- Full case name: State of New South Wales v Fahy, Gemma
- Decided: 22 May 2007
- Citations: [2007] HCA 20, (2007) 232 CLR 486

Case history
- Prior action: [2006] NSWCA 64
- Appealed from: NSW Court of Appeal
- Subsequent action: [2008] NSWCA 34

Court membership
- Judges sitting: Gleeson CJ, Gummow, Kirby, Hayne, Callinan, Heydon, Crennan JJ

Case opinions
- (4:3) Appeal upheld and decision in favour of the Plaintiff overturned, but with costs to be paid by the defendant, the State of NSW (per Gummow and Hayne JJ, and per Callinan and Heydon JJ in a separate judgment; Gleeson CJ, Kirby and Crennan JJ dissenting, each in separate judgments) (4:2) The case of Wyong Shire Council v Shirt (1980) 146 CLR 40 remains good law regarding what is a "breach of duty of care" in negligence. (per Gleeson CJ, Gummow, Kirby, Hayne JJ; Callinan and Heydon JJ dissenting; Crennan J not addressing this issue.)

On 22 May 2007, the High Court of Australia handed down a judgment in the case of New South Wales v Fahy. The proceedings were started by Gemma Fahy, a former police officer in New South Wales, who sued the state for (amongst other grounds) failing to provide a safe working environment. The Court also considered whether Wyong Shire Council v Shirt, the main Australian test for a breach of duty of care, should be overturned - in the end, ruling that it remains good law.

== Facts of this Case ==
The Plaintiff, Gemma Fahy, was a constable in the New South Wales Police Force in August 1999 when, as part of her duties, she attended the scene of a robbery with her partner, Senior Constable Evans. Near the scene, she attended to one of the victims who had suffered multiple injuries and was fearing for his life. Whilst she was attending to him, Senior Constable Evans and another senior police officer had left Fahy on her own.

It was found at trial, and at the New South Wales Court of Appeal, that Fahy had suffered significant psychological trauma as a result of the incident. Some of this she had attributed to the failure of her partner, Senior Constable Evans, or of other officers to come to her aid.

The primary issue before the High Court of Australia was whether non-compliance with this "buddy system" (of having partners, when together, stay together) had resulted in harm to Fahy that was reasonably foreseeable.

== Decision ==
In a split decision, a majority of the bench ruled that the injuries and trauma suffered by Fahy as a result of being left alone were not reasonably foreseeable - and accordingly, that the decision of the trial judge and the New South Wales Court of Appeal should be overturned.
