= Drug Court of New South Wales =

- Established: 5 February 1999
- Jurisdiction: New South Wales, Australia
- Location: Parramatta, Toronto, and Sydney CBD
- Composition method: Vice-regal appointment on the Premier's nomination, following advice of the Attorney- General and Cabinet
- Authorised by: Parliament of New South Wales via the Drug Court Act 1998 (NSW)
- Appeals to: New South Wales Court of Criminal Appeal
- Number of positions: 5
- Website: drugcourt.nsw.gov.au

Senior Judge, Drug Court of NSW
- Currently: Judge Roger Dive

The Drug Court of New South Wales is an inferior court constituted as a court of record within the Australian court hierarchy with its jurisdiction limited to New South Wales, Australia. It is a specialist court that deals with criminal offences in which the defendant has an addiction to illicit drugs. The Court exercises both local and district court jurisdiction and has a similar status to the District Court of New South Wales.

Established pursuant to the Drug Court Act 1998 (NSW), the Court was the first drug court of its type in Australia.

== History ==
The Court commenced on 5 February 1999. The court arose of the use of drug courts in the United States of America. It commenced operations in Sydney as a pilot program with the goal of establishing the question of whether a Drug Court is more effective and cost-effective in reducing crime among drug-dependent criminal offenders than the conventional sanctions. The first participant commenced on 8 February.

== Jurisdiction ==
The Court is constituted by multiple Drug Court Judges, led by a Senior Judge (currently Senior Judge Jane Mottley). The Court operates from four locations in New South Wales: in Parramatta, Toronto, Sydney CBD and in Dubbo, accepting referrals from the Local Court of New South Wales and the District Court. Matters referred to the Drug Court are then dealt with in the Drug Court, provided that the individual meets the eligibility criteria and is accepted onto the program. Matters for persons not accepted onto the program may be dealt with by the Drug Court but are usually referred back to the originating court for dispensation.

== Judges ==
The Governor may appoint District Court Judges to be a Drug Court Judge. The Governor may also appoint one of those Drug Court Judges to be a Senior Drug Court Judge.

== Objectives ==
The objectives of the Court are to reduce the drug dependency of eligible persons, to promote the re-integration of such drug dependent persons into the community, and to reduce the need for such drug dependent persons to resort to criminal activity to support their drug dependencies. The Court diverts drug dependent offenders into supervised treatment plans which aim to reduce or eliminate their drug dependence. Treatment options offered include abstinence and pharmacotherapy programs, and may be provided in either a community or residential rehabilitation environment.

There are four fundamental aspects that are common to each Drug Court program plan:-

- Evidence-based treatment of drug use.
- Social support and the development of living skills.
- Regular reports to the Court regarding participant progress, and
- Regular testing for drug use.

== Eligibility and selection for a program ==
To be eligible for the Drug Court a person must:-

- be highly likely to be sentenced to full-time imprisonment if convicted,
- have indicated a desire to plead guilty to the offence,
- be dependent on the use of prohibited drugs,
- reside within the specified catchment area,
- be referred from a court in the catchment area,
- be 18 years of age or over,
- be willing to participate,
- not be charged with a violent, sexual offence or an offence under Division 2 Part 2 of the Drug Misuse and Trafficking Act (1985), and
- not be suffering a mental condition that could prevent or restrict participation in the program.

== Program Progression ==
After detoxification and assessment, offenders appears before the Drug Court to enter a guilty plea. Offenders receive a suspended sentence and signs an undertaking to abide by the program conditions. This process marks the commencement of the offender's Drug Court program. Each participant's program comprises three phases. Each phase has distinct goals that must be achieved before the participant graduates to the next phase of their program.

Phase One is the 'initiation' phase where participants are expected to reduce drug use, stabilise their physical health and to cease criminal activity. In this phase, participants are required to undergo drug testing at least three times a week and to report back to the Drug Court once a week.

Phase Two is the 'consolidation' phase where participants are expected to remain drug-free and crime-free, and to develop life and job skills. In this phase, testing for drug use is conducted twice weekly and report-back court appearances occur fortnightly.

Phase Three is the 'reintegration' phase where participants are expected to gain or be ready to gain employment, and to be financially responsible. In this phase, drug testing is conducted twice weekly and report-back court appearances are conducted monthly.

The Court may confer rewards on a participant when they maintain a satisfactory level of compliance with their Drug Court program. Rewards may be simply a round of applause, or perhaps permission to work even during Phase One. Sanctions may be imposed on a participant who fails to comply with the program. Participants are informed of the types of behaviour that can attract rewards and sanctions. The most severe form of sanction available to the court, short of program termination, is a custodial sanction of up to 14 days. Community-based sanctions, such as increased supervision or community work, are also available to the Court. A program will last for at least 12 months unless it is terminated sooner.

A Drug Court program can be terminated when:-

- the Court decides that the participant has substantially complied with the program, or
- the participant applies to have it terminated, or
- the Court decides that the participant is unlikely to make any further progress in the program, or that further participation poses an unacceptable risk to the community that the offender will re-offend.

When a program is terminated the Court must reconsider the initial sentence. If appropriate, that sentence can be set aside and another sentence imposed in its place. In deciding the final sentence the Court will take into consideration the nature of the offenders participation in the program, any sanctions that have been imposed and any time spent in custody during the program. The initial sentence cannot be increased. When the Court finds that a participant has substantially complied with a program a bond is the usual final court order. The Court awards a Certificate of Graduation or a Certificate of Substantial Achievement to participants who have met the standards that the Court has set.

== See also ==
- List of New South Wales courts and tribunals
