= Industrial Court of New South Wales =

Australian Superior Court

- Established: 2 September 1996
- Dissolved: 7 December 2016
- Jurisdiction: New South Wales, Australia
- Location: Chief Secretary’s Building, Macquarie Street, Sydney CBD
- Authorised by: Parliament of New South Wales via the Industrial Relations Act 1996 (NSW) and the Industrial Relations Further Amendment (Jurisdiction of Industrial Relations Commission) Act 2009 (NSW)
- Appeals to: New South Wales Court of Appeal (judicial review only); New South Wales Court of Criminal Appeal
- Appeals from: Chief Industrial Magistrate's Court

Justice Ingmar Taylor
- Since: February 2024
- Currently: Acting deputy president to be appointed if there is a full-bench appeal

The court has been reestablished as of July 2024.

The Industrial Court of New South Wales was a court within the Australian court hierarchy that exercised the judicial functions of the Industrial Relations Commission of New South Wales within the Australian state of New South Wales. The Commission has exclusive jurisdiction in respect of industrial disputes in that state.

The primary courtrooms were located in the Chief Secretary’s Building in Macquarie Street, Sydney central business district.

The Industrial Relations Commission of New South Wales consisted of both judicial and non-judicial members, and its members could exercise the arbitration powers of the commission. However, only the Commission sitting "in Court Session" could exercise the judicial functions of the commission. When the commission sat as the "Commission in Court Session", it was referred to and was known as the "Industrial Court of New South Wales". Only a judicial member could hear matters where such relief was sought from the Court.

== Jurisdiction of the Court ==
The Court had jurisdiction over matters about unfair contracts, prosecutions of offences under the Industrial Relations Act, proceedings for breaches of industrial instruments, appeals against decisions of inferior courts in industrial matters (such as from the Chief Industrial Magistrates Court of New South Wales), and prosecution of occupational health and safety offences under the Occupational Health and Safety Act 2000 (NSW). The Court also has jurisdiction over prosecutions for safety related dismissals (see section 23 of the Occupational Health and Safety Act 2000 (NSW) and may grant remedies for safety related dismissals, such as reinstatement and continuity of employment.

The Commission when sitting as the Court was and sat as a superior court of record and is of equivalent status to the Supreme Court of New South Wales and the Land and Environment Court of New South Wales although it does not hold the supervisory jurisdiction held by the Supreme Court of New South Wales. The Court was formerly called the "Industrial Commission of New South Wales in Court Session". The name of the court was changed by the Industrial Relations Amendment Act 2005 (NSW) to the "Industrial Court of New South Wales".

== Jurisdictional limits of the Court and the Commission ==
Persons seeking relief in the Court for unfair contract needed to bring the claim within 2 years and earn under $200,000 per annum (an extension to the time limit of 3 months was available in certain circumstances).

A prosecution for a breach of the Occupational Health and Safety Act 2000 (NSW) or other occupational health and safety legislation needed to be brought within two years of the breach or two years after the conclusion of a Coronial Inquest by the NSW Coroner.

The Howard Government's WorkChoices reforms to the Workplace Relations Act 1996 (Cth), which took effect on 27 March 2007, excluded the operation of the Commission and Court's jurisdictions over matters involving Constitutional Corporations and persons employed by such corporations. The Court's jurisdiction over occupational health and safety matters was preserved and remained valid. The WorkChoices legislation was repealed by the Rudd Government following the enactment of the Fair Work Act 2009.

== Abolition of the Court ==
In December 2016 the Industrial Court was abolished and its jurisdiction transferred to the Supreme Court of NSW. The sole remaining judicial member, the President Michael Walton, was appointed to the Supreme Court.

== Reestablishment of the Court ==
Industrial Relations Amendment Act 2023.

== See also ==
- List of New South Wales courts and tribunals

== Sources ==
- Halsbury’s Laws of Australia
- Industrial Relations Act 1991 (NSW)
- Second Reading speech by the Milton Orkopoulos, Minister for Aboriginal Affairs, and Minister Assisting the Premier on Citizenship, in the Legislative Assembly of the New South Wales Government on 17 November 2005.
