= Court of Coal Mines Regulation of New South Wales =

The Court of Coal Mines Regulation was a court established in New South Wales, a state of Australia to investigate mining accidents and to determine certain offences relating to coal mining. The court was abolished on 23 December 2006.

== Composition ==
The court was established under the Coal Mines Regulation Act 1982 (NSW). It could exercise functions under the Act from 26 March 1984.

The Governor of New South Wales could appoint a judge of the District Court of New South Wales to sit as the court.

The court was to sit with assessors when determining appeals or when considering an objection by the chief inspector of coal mines to the appointment of a plant manager of a coal mine. Appeals to the court were available against certain decisions of the Minister for Mineral Resources.

In other cases, the court was to sit alone, although in the case of an inquiry into a mining accident, the court could be assisted by a barrister or a solicitor, usually called “counsel assisting”.

The reports of a Court of Coal Mines Regulation could have far reaching consequences leading to changes in coal mining practice and by its exposure of poor practices or poor implementation of proper practices.

== Caseload ==
There are no published figures on the caseload of the court.

== Appeals ==
There was the provision of appeals to the Supreme Court of New South Wales and the Court of Criminal Appeal of New South Wales.

== Notable case ==
The most notable case was that relating to the Gretley coal mine disaster, near Newcastle, where four men were killed when their mining machine broke into the flooded workings of an old coalmine, abandoned over 80 years earlier. The inquiry was held by his Honour Jim Staunton, former chief judge of the District Court of New South Wales, who was appointed to be an acting judge of the Court for this inquiry.

The inquiry was notable for its early use of technology to display information electronically in the court room.

Previously, the last judicial inquiry into a coalmining disaster was held in respect of the Appin explosion in 1979, under the previous Coal Mines Regulation Act 1912, which was held by Judge Goran.

== Abolition ==
The court was abolished on 23 December 2006 by the Coal Mine Health and Safety Act 2002 (NSW).
