= Youth Drug and Alcohol Court of New South Wales =

The Youth Drug and Alcohol Court of New South Wales was the generic name given to a harm minimization program administered through the Children's Court of New South Wales that operated between 2000 and 2012. The Court was a children's court that specialised in criminal offences in which a child over 14 but under 18 years of age has an addiction to illicit drugs or alcohol.

The Court was the first youth court of its type that was established in Australia.

== History ==
The establishment of the Youth Drug and Alcohol Court program was one of the outcomes of the New South Wales Government’s Drug Summit in 1999. The summit was called to address increasing community concern about the role of illicit drugs in the community.

One of the Summit’s recommendation was that the existing Adult Drug Court trial underway at Parramatta (see Drug Court of New South Wales be expanded to be available to young offenders. The initial trial was conducted at Campbelltown and commenced on 31 July 2000. The program was established as a pilot for two years and continued until July 2012, when the Court was axed due to budget cuts.

== Jurisdiction ==
The Court was constituted by a single Children's Magistrate of the Children's Court of New South Wales. It operated in Sydney at Parramatta, Bidura Glebe and Campbelltown. Matters referred to the Youth Drug and Alcohol Court were then dealt with by that program, provided that the child met the eligibility criteria and was accepted onto the program.

== Magistrates ==
There were no special requirements for appointment of a children's magistrate to the program. This differs to the Adult Drug Court where the Governor of New South Wales appoints the judicial officer to the court.

== Objectives ==
The objectives of the Court were to reduce the alcohol and drug dependency of children, to promote the re-integration of such drug dependent children into their families and the community, and to reduce the need for such drug dependent children to resort to criminal activity to support their drug dependencies.

The program differs to the Adult Drug Court in that children were dealt with pre-sentence rather than post sentence. A sentence on a child is postponed until full participation through the program has been undertaken.

== Eligibility and selection for a program ==
Eligibility for the program was limited to young people who:

1. Were ineligible for a caution or conference under the Young Offenders Act 1997 (NSW).
2. Were charged with an offence that was able to be dealt with by a Children’s Court (that is, the young person is aged between 10 and 18 years at the time of the commission of the offence and the offence was not a serious children’s indictable or traffic offence that is dealt with by other courts)
3. Have a demonstrable drug and/or alcohol problem.
4. Reside within the catchment area (Greater Sydney)
5. Were not charged with a sexual offence.
6. Plead guilty or indicate an intention to plead guilty if admitted into the program.
7. Consent to participate in the program.
8. Were aged between 14 and 18 years, although the YDAC Magistrate had discretion to admit into the program young people under 14 years who were assessed as being suitable for admission. It is the discretion of the presiding children's magistrate to determine whether the child was referred to the program.

== Evaluation ==
The program was reviewed in 2003 by the Social Policy Research Centre of the University of New South Wales and was considered a success.
