= Gaming Tribunal of New South Wales =

Retired tribunal for investigating illegal gaming

The Gaming Tribunal of New South Wales was a tribunal with jurisdiction to make declarations that premises were being used for the purposes of illegal gaming. The consequences of such a declaration were that the police could enter the premises at any time without the issue of a warrant, and may seize gambling implements, money and securities. The tribunal was abolished in 1998.

== History ==
The tribunal was created because the New South Wales parliament felt that the existing process in declaring a gaming house was ineffective. The Police Minister in the New South Wales Legislative Council on 12 November 1987 said: “The current legislation which vests the Supreme Court of New South Wales with jurisdiction to declare premises as gaming houses has not proved to be as successful as had been hoped. Police have not been able to obtain speedy declarations based on a reasonable suspicion of gaming being conducted on the premises. The experience has been that the suspicion required to be shown is high and to make a declaration the Supreme Court has generally relied upon a successful raid or infiltration by the police. Therefore, before making an application to the court, the Crown Solicitor has usually required either actual evidence of gaming on the premises or significant evidence from within the premises that they are being used as gaming houses." The tribunal came into existence on 18 January 1988 and was abolished on 1998.

== Jurisdiction ==
The tribunal was created by section 38A.of the Gaming and Betting Act 1912. That section was introduced by the Gaming and Betting (Amendment) Act 1987. The tribunal was an inferior court and established as a court of record. The tribunal was abolished in 1998 when the Local Court of New South Wales was given the jurisdiction to make declarations.

== Constitution of the tribunal ==
The Chief Judge of the District Court of New South Wales was the president of the tribunal. The Governor of New South Wales could appoint a deputy president. Each of the judges of the District court automatically became members of the tribunal. Chief Justice Street In Lisafa Holdings Pty Ltd V Commissioner of Police (1988) 15 NSWLR 1 criticised the automatic appointment of judges to the tribunal as it threatened the judicial independence of those judges as they were not given the choice as to whether to participate in the tribunal.

When considering an application for a declaration, the tribunal was constituted by a single member. When consider an application for recission of a declaration, the tribunal was constituted by the president and two other members.

== Effect of a declaration by the tribunal ==
The tribunal could make an interim declaration that premises were a gaming house. The tribunal had to consider the application for a declaration within five days. The effect of such a declaration were major. Police could search the premises at any time without warrant. Police could seize any items suspected of being used for gambling. Any person entering or leaving the premises could be arrested without warrant. They could be subject to penalties unless they could prove that they had a lawful purpose for being there. The tribunal could also make a final declaration. The effect of a final declaration was that the premises could not be used for any business purposes whatsoever. This would remain in effect until the tribunal removed the order.

== Criticisms of the tribunal ==
The Independent Commission against Corruption of New South Wales (ICAC) in its first report on the relationship between police and criminals noted police criticisms of the tribunal. The commission noted that the means of obtaining a declaration were “technical, difficult to interpret and difficult to enforce”. The New South Wales Government abolished the tribunal in 1998 as well as the Gaming and Betting Act 1912 and replaced it with the Unlawful Gambling Act 1998 to simplify the procedure. The jurisdiction to make declarations was then given to the Local Court.

== See also ==
- Gaming Control Board
