= New South Wales Court of Criminal Appeal =

Highest state criminal court in New South Wales, Australia

- Jurisdiction: New South Wales
- Location: Six locations in Sydney CBD
- Composition method: Vice-regal appointment upon Premier's nomination, following advice of the Attorney General and Cabinet
- Authorised by: Parliament of New South Wales via the: Constitution Act 1902 (NSW); Supreme Court Act 1970 (NSW); Criminal Appeal Act 1912 (NSW)
- Appeals to: High Court of Australia
- Appeals from: Supreme Court of NSW; District Court of NSW; Industrial Court of NSW; Land & Environment Court of NSW; Drug Court of NSW
- Judge term length: mandatory retirement by age of 72
- Website: supremecourt.justice.nsw.gov.au

Chief Justice of New South Wales
- Currently: Justice Andrew Bell
- Since: 7 March 2022

President of the Court of Appeal
- Currently: Justice Julie Ward
- Since: 7 March 2022

The New South Wales Court of Criminal Appeal, part of the Supreme Court of New South Wales, is the highest court for criminal matters and has appellate jurisdiction in the Australian State of New South Wales.

== Jurisdiction ==
The Court hears appeals from people who were convicted or pleaded guilty and were sentenced by a Supreme or District court judge. The Court also hears appeals lodged by the Crown regarding the adequacy of a sentence. Decisions made by the Land and Environment Court, the Industrial Court or the Drug Court in criminal jurisdiction may also be brought for appeal. The Court of Criminal Appeal may also grant leave to appeal in matters involving questions of fact or mixed questions of fact and law. It may also grant leave to appeal in cases where the severity or adequacy of the sentence is challenged.

If a petitioner is not satisfied with the decision made by the Court of Criminal Appeal, application may be made to the High Court of Australia for special leave to appeal the decision before the High Court.

== Composition ==
Three judges usually form the panel for appeals, although five judges can be used for significant legal issues. The Chief Justice has ultimate discretion in determining the number of judges to sit on the Bench, and the selection of individual judges for each case. A unanimous decision is not needed as the majority view will prevail. The presiding judge is usually one of the Chief Justice, the President of the Court of Appeal, a Judge of Appeal or the Chief Judge at Common Law. Typically each bench comprises at least two judges of the Common Law Division. Single judges hear sentence appeals from the Drug Court.

The Judges who may typically be the presiding judge are listed below:

Name	Title	Term began	Time in office	Notes
Andrew Bell	Chief Justice	7 March 2022	3 years, 13 days	
Julie Ward	President, Court of Appeal	7 March 2022	3 years, 13 days	
Anthony Meagher	Judge of Appeal	10 August 2011	13 years, 222 days	
Fabian Gleeson	Judge of Appeal	29 April 2013	11 years, 325 days	
Mark Leeming	Judge of Appeal	3 June 2013	11 years, 290 days	
Anthony Payne	Judge of Appeal	30 March 2016	8 years, 355 days	
Richard White	Judge of Appeal	15 March 2017	8 years, 5 days	
Anna Mitchelmore	Judge of Appeal	28 March 2022	2 years, 357 days	
Jeremy Kirk	Judge of Appeal	21 April 2022	2 years, 333 days	
Christine Adamson	Judge of Appeal	7 December 2022	2 years, 103 days	
Kristina Stern	Judge of Appeal	8 June 2023	1 year, 285 days	
Ian Harrison	Chief Judge at Common Law	9 November 2023	1 year, 131 days	
David Hammerschlag	Chief Judge in Equity	17 March 2022	3 years, 3 days	
John Griffiths	Acting Judge of Appeal	10 April 2022	2 years, 344 days	
John Basten	Acting Judge of Appeal	17 April 2022	2 years, 337 days	

== Caseload ==
In 2018, the Court heard 407 new cases, which included 265 appeals against severity of sentence, 108 appeals against conviction, 19 appeals against interlocutory judgments and 1 case returned from the High Court for re-hearing. Appeals against convictions were approximately 27 per cent in 2018 and, in recent years have shown a trend towards increasing complexity, impacting on Court time and resources.

== See also ==
- List of New South Wales courts and tribunals
