= Helen Wilson (Australian judge) =

Australian judge

The Honourable Justice Helen McLeod Wilson

Judge of the Supreme Court of NSW
- Incumbent
- Assumed office 3 November 2014

Judge of the District Court of NSW
- In office 28 April 2014 – 2 November 2014

Personal details
- Born: Newcastle, NSW
- Education: Swansea High School; University of Sydney
- Occupation: Judge and lawyer

Helen McLeod Wilson is an Australian judge. She has been a judge of the Supreme Court of New South Wales since November 2014.

Wilson was born in Newcastle and raised in the Swansea area. She was educated at Swansea High School before studying arts and law at the University of Sydney. She was admitted as a solicitor in 1989, and worked as a solicitor in the Criminal Division of the Legal Aid Commission of NSW from 1990 to 1992. She then went to work for the Office of the Director of Public Prosecutions as senior solicitor from 1992 to 1995, managing lawyer at their Campbelltown regional office from 1995 to 1997 and finally as trial advocate. Wilson was admitted as a barrister in 1999, and was an acting Crown Prosecutor until being made permanent in the role in 2001. In one prominent case, she was the prosecutor in the 2008 child sex trial of former state minister Milton Orkopoulos. Wilson attained senior counsel status in 2013.

Wilson was appointed to the District Court of New South Wales in April 2014, based in Newcastle. Five months later, in November 2014, she was elevated to the Supreme Court.
