= Montgomerie Hamilton =

Scotland international rugby union player

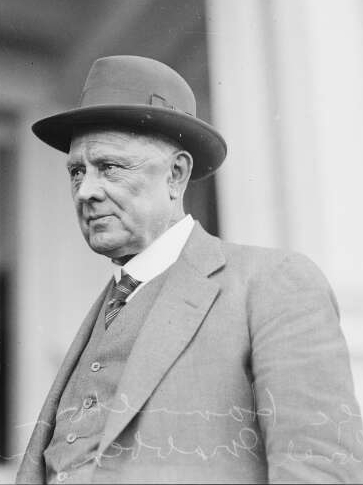
- Montgomerie Hamilton in 1930
- Born: Hugh Montgomerie Hamilton; 26 June 1854 Parramatta Colony of New South Wales
- Died: 11 October 1930 (aged 76) Strathfield, New South Wales, Australia

Rugby union career
- Position: Three-Quarters
Amateur team(s)
Years	Team	Apps	(Points)
-	West of Scotland		
International career
Years	Team	Apps	(Points)
1874–75	Scotland	2	(0)

Hugh Montgomerie Hamilton (26 June 1854 – 11 August 1930) was an Australian barrister and judge who played international rugby union for Scotland from 1874 to 1875.

== Early life ==
Hamilton was born at Parramatta in the Colony of New South Wales, the eldest son of Margaret Clunes née Innes and Hugh Hamilton, a pastoralist from Ayrshire, Scotland. He was educated at Geneva, Edinburgh and Marlborough College.

== Rugby Union career ==
=== Amateur career ===
Hamilton was a member of the Marlborough College rugby team for 3 years, the last as captain, subsequently playing for West of Scotland and Marlborough Nomads.

=== International career ===
In 1874 he was selected by both England and Scotland for the fixture at The Oval on 23 February 1874, electing to play for Scotland.

His second - and last - match for Scotland, again against England, was the fixture at Raeburn Place, Edinburgh on 8 March 1875. He is credited with introducing the passing game into rugby union, along with (Sir) William Milton.

== Legal career ==
Hamilton was a student of the Inner Temple from 22 May 1875, studying law at the University of London and graduating in 1877. He was called to the bar on 15 May 1878. He practiced as a barrister for 11 years before returning to Sydney in 1890. On 12 May 1914 he was appointed a judge of the District Court of NSW, where he served for more than 19 years, before being retired at age 70 in 1924.

== Freemasonry ==
Hamilton was initiated into Freemasonry at the Northern Bar Lodge No. 1610 in London on the 11th of June 1883. On arrival back in Sydney, he affiliated with Lodge Ionic No. 65 on the 21st of July 1890. Between the years of 1909 and 1910, he was made the Grand Master of the United Grand Lodge of New South Wales.

== Personal life ==
He married Adelaide Eliza Margaret Northcott on 18 March 1880. He married a second time to Minnie née Redfern who predeceased him on 9 August 1924. He died at Strathfield on 11 August 1930 (aged 76), survived by a daughter and two sons from his second marriage.
