= Workers Compensation Commission of New South Wales =

Government commission

Personal Injury Commission of New South Wales
- Established: 1 March 2022
- Jurisdiction: New South Wales, Australia
- Composition method: Vice-regal appointment upon Premier's nomination, following advice of the Attorney General and Cabinet
- Authorised by: Parliament of New South Wales via the Personal Injury Commission Act 2020 (NSW)
- Appeals to: New South Wales District or Supreme Court
- Website: www.pi.nsw.gov.au

President
- Currently: Judge Gerard Phillips

The Personal Injury Commission resolves disputes between people injured in motor accidents and workplaces in NSW, insurers and employers.

The Personal Injury Commission was established by the Personal Injury Commission Act 2020 (NSW) and came into effect in March 2021.

Previously, personal injury claims within New South Wales was dealt with by other tribunals, such as former Workers Compensation Commission, and the Motor Accident Authority (now the State Insurance Regulatory Authority) which delivered the Medical Assessment Service, the Claims Assessment & Resolution Service, and thereafter the Dispute Resolution Service. All these services are now under the Personal Injury Commission, as of March 2021.

The commission was presided over by a judge, called a President, and was appointed by the Governor of New South Wales on the recommendation of the Attorney General of New South Wales. The President was the head of the commission and determines appeals and questions of law. The President also appoints Medical Assessors and Members. The Registrar oversees the day-to-day operations of the commission and makes decisions about certain disputes. Members and Medical Assessors are decision makers who are independent of the worker, employer, insurer, or any other party involved in a dispute.

== Current Delegation of the Personal Injury Commission ==
The Delegation of the commission is as follows:

- Judge Gerard Phillips, President
- Marie Johns, Division Head, Motor Accidents Division
- Marianne Christmann, Principal Registrar
- Siobhan Flores-Walsh, Director, Legal and Policy
- Rodney Parsons, Former Division Head, Workers Compensation Division

== Former Workers Compensation Commission ==
The Workers Compensation Commission of New South Wales was a tribunal in the Australian State of New South Wales. It had unlimited jurisdiction within the state in workers compensation matters.

It was re-established on 1 August 1998 replacing the Compensation Court of New South Wales for most workers compensation matters. Jurisdiction in respect of the injury of police and miners was transferred to the District Court of New South Wales. Common law claims continue to remain the common law courts.

== History ==
Workers compensation was first introduced into New South Wales with the introduction of the Workmens Compensation Act 1910 (NSW). The Act applied to dangerous occupations in which personal injury arose out of an accident or in the course of employment.

The Workers Compensation Act 1926 (NSW) expanded the role of workers compensation in the State. It introduced compulsory insurance for employers and it also established the first specialised workers compensation tribunal in Australia, being the Workers Compensation Commission of New South Wales.

The commission exercised both judicial and executive power. It was constituted with a judicial member and two lay members. The commission also had the power to license and supervise the operations of insurers.

In 1984, the Workers Compensation Commission was replaced by two bodies, the State Compensation Board of New South Wales and the Compensation Court of New South Wales. The Board took over administrative and licensing functions which the commission formerly had, and the Court continued to exercise the judicial functions.

In 1998, the tribunal was recreated and the Compensation court was abolished.

== See also ==
- List of New South Wales courts and tribunals
