= Charles Heydon =

Australian judge, barrister and politician

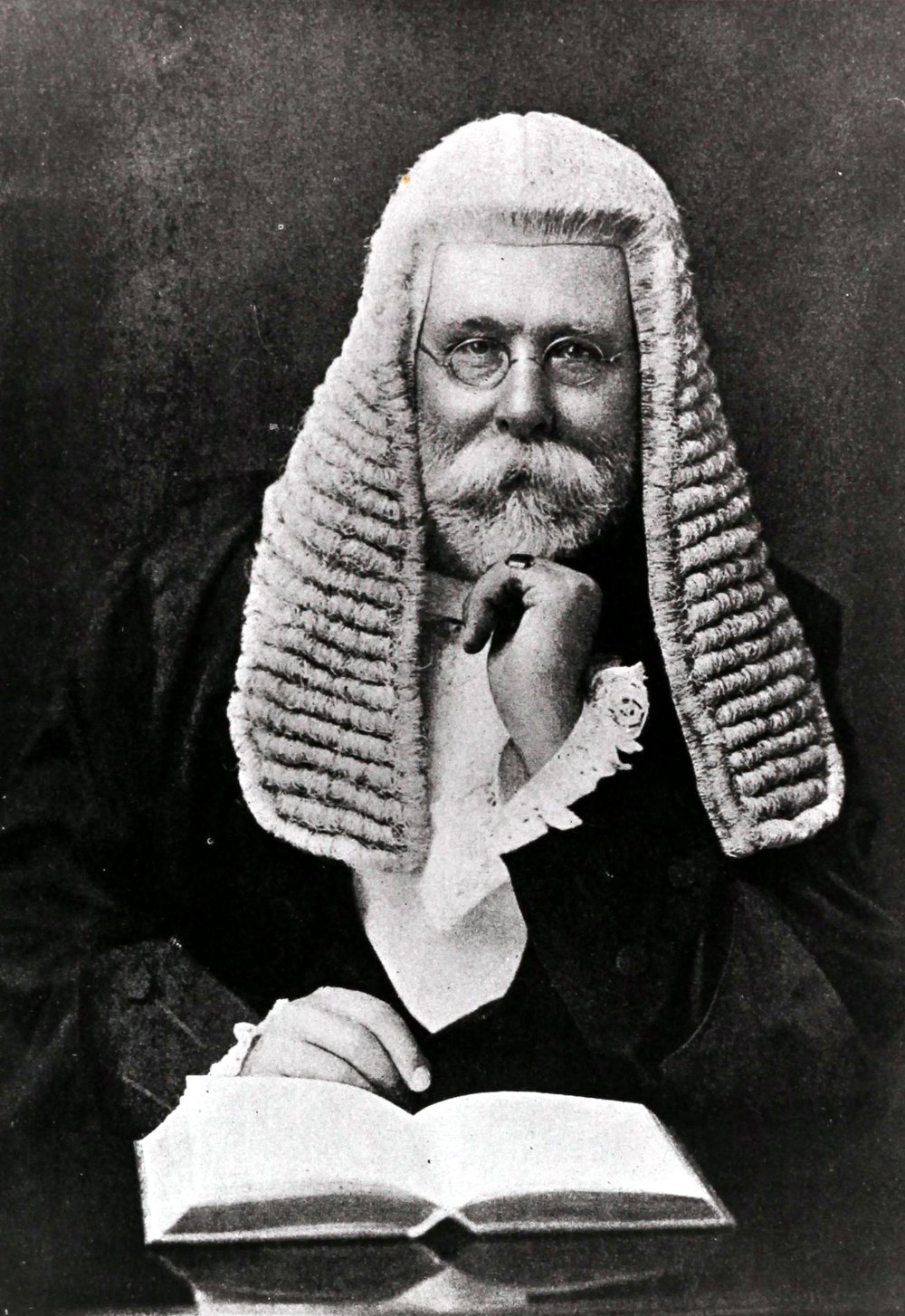

Charles Gilbert Heydon QC (25 August 1845 – 1 January 1932) was an Australian politician and judge.

== Early life ==
He was born in Sydney to journeyman printer Jabez King Heydon and Sophia née Hayes, and his godfather was Archbishop Polding. He attended St Mary's Cathedral school and then Reverend Thomas Aitken's school at Ryde. In 1860 he started working for the Commercial Banking Company of Sydney, becoming a branch manager until he resigned to study for the bar.

== Barrister and politician ==
Heydon was called to the bar in 1875, building a successful practice in commercial and common law. He was a candidate for the New South Wales Legislative Assembly seat of Argyle at the 1877 election, but was defeated by 337 votes (23.4%). (Note: Antony Green lists the candidate as Charles George Heydon, however in 1878 Heydon confirmed he was a candidate for Argyle.) He was a candidate at the 1878 East Maitland by-election, but was again unsuccessful, defeated by 127 votes (19.6%). His practice as a barrister included prosecuting Peter Howe, a member of the Legislative Assembly, who was convicted with James Miller of conspiracy to defraud the Australian Mercantile Loan and Guarantee Company. He was appointed an acting judge of the Supreme Court in April 1892, and was the trial judge of a manager and auditor who were also charged with conspiracy to defraud the Australian Mercantile Loan and Guarantee Company.

His younger brother Louis was a member of the Legislative Assembly from 1882 until 1886 and was appointed to the New South Wales Legislative Council in 1889. Charles was appointed Attorney General in the third Dibbs ministry in December 1893, joining Louis in the Legislative Council. The Dibbs ministry was defeated at the election in August 1894.

The following year he prosecuted Paddy Crick, Dick Meagher and George Dean who had been charged with conspiring to pervert the course of justice in relation to the pardon of Dean for the attempted murder of his wife.

In August 1896 he volunteered to take on the task of consolidating the statute law of New South Wales, consisting of nearly 1400 acts, a task that had not been completed by a royal commission. The task would take Heydon 6 years to complete. In November 1896 he was appointed Queen's Counsel. He resigned from the Legislative Council on 22 March 1898, having been appointed as an acting judge of Supreme Court, but was re-appointed on 10 May once those duties had concluded.

== Judicial career ==
On 1 March 1900 he was appointed a Judge of the District Court, for the northern district. In 1905 he was appointed President of the Court of Arbitration, which became the Industrial Court in 1908 and the Court of Industrial Arbitration in 1912.

In 1918 the Judges Retirement Act 1918 (NSW), operated to retrospectively impose a retirement age of 70, forcing Heydon, Ernest Docker and Grantley Fitzhardinge to retire on 31 December 1918.

== Personal life and death ==
On 8 September 1880 he married Miriam Josepha Makinson, with whom he had two sons. Miriam died in 1896 and in 1909 he married Sybil Russell, a 28 year old art student.

Heydon died at Potts Point in 1932.

== Notes ==
Parliament of New South Wales
Political offices
Preceded by Edmund Barton	Attorney General; Dec 1893 – Aug 1894	Succeeded by George Simpson
Legal offices
Preceded by Henry Cohen	President of the Court of Arbitration; 1905 – 1908; President of the Industrial Court; 1908 – 1912; President of the Court of Industrial Arbitration; 1912 – 1918	Succeeded by Walter Edmunds
