= Local Government Pecuniary Interest Tribunal of New South Wales =

The Local Government Pecuniary Interest and Disciplinary Tribunal of New South Wales is a former tribunal which dealt with complaints about local councils in New South Wales, a state of Australia. The tribunal began operations on 1 July 1993. On 1 January 2005, the tribunal's name was changed from Local Government Pecuniary Interest Tribunal reflecting an increase in its functions. On 1 January 2014 its functions were merged into the newly established New South Wales Civil and Administrative Tribunal (NACT).

== Composition ==
The Governor of New South Wales may appoint a person as a member of the tribunal. The person must be a lawyer who is eligible to be either a judge of the Supreme Court of New South Wales or the District Court of New South Wales. A retired judge of those courts is also eligible for appointment.

The governor may also appoint a deputy to the tribunal if necessary.

The current member of the tribunal is David Officer KC.

== Jurisdiction ==
Since its creation, the tribunal has had exclusive jurisdiction to inquire into referred complaints about the failure to disclose pecuniary interests by mayors and local government councillors. A pecuniary interest is an interest that a person has in a matter because of a reasonable likelihood or expectation of appreciable financial gain or loss to the person in exercising their duties or functions in local government. Generally, a complaint is made first to the Director-General of the New South Wales Department of Local Government. The director-general may then refer the complaint to the tribunal for hearing.

From 1 January 2005, the tribunal received the additional jurisdiction to decide allegations of misconduct referred by the director-general. The director-general may investigate the allegations, and either deal with the matter him or herself, or may refer the matter to the tribunal.

The director-general in some cases may suspend a person. When this occurs, the person may appeal to the tribunal under section 440M. When the tribunal decides this appeal, there is no further appeal allowed.

== Hearings ==
The tribunal has the power to hold public or private hearings. Generally, proceedings are to be open to the public. It has the power to issue notices requiring documents to be produced or for witnesses to attend before the tribunal.

A person appearing before the tribunal may be legally represented.

A person appearing before the tribunal may be required to answer questions even if they incriminate the person.

Contempt of the tribunal may be referred to the Supreme Court for consideration.

== Decisions ==
A person may be found in contravention of the Act on the balance of probabilities, rather than beyond reasonable doubt. Where such a finding has been made, the tribunal may counsel the offender, reprimand them, suspend them or disqualified them. It may in certain circumstances, recommend other action be taken against the person.

A person may appeal to the Supreme Court of New South Wales in respect of a finding.

== Location ==
The tribunal is located at:

Suite 1, Level 3, Stockland House 181 Castlereagh Street SYDNEY
