= Transport Appeal Boards of New South Wales =

Former Australian tribunal

The Transport Appeals Board of New South Wales was a tribunal established under the Transport Appeal Boards Act 1980 (NSW). It heard certain promotional appeals and disciplinary appeals from transport employees of the New South Wales State Government.

== History ==
The tribunal was established on 1 July 1980. It replaced the Appeals Board constituted under section 87 of the Government Railways Act 1912 (NSW) or the Appeal Board constituted under section 114 of the Transport Act 1930 (NSW).

It ceased to exist as from 1 September 2012. From that date some appeals are heard within Transport for NSW while RailCorp workers may lodge appeals with Fair Work Australia, NSW Anti-Discrimination Board, Australian Human Rights Commission and Supreme Court of New South Wales while State Transit employees may lodge appeals with the Industrial Relations Commission, NSW Anti-Discrimination Board, Australian Human Rights Commission and NSW Supreme Court.

== Jurisdiction ==
TAB heard and determined appeals against decisions relating to the discipline and promotion of NSW transport employees. Generally, these were employees of the RailCorp, NSW TrainLink, Sydney Trains, the State Transit Authority and Sydney Ferries.

In determining a promotional appeal, the board determined who is the most meritous person.

There were limited rights of appeal to the Supreme Court of New South Wales and in some cases, no right of appeal.

== Chairperson and members ==
The governor of New South Wales appointed a chairperson of the tribunal. The governor may also have appointed deputy chairpersons.

The boards sat with three members. Either the chairperson or a deputy chairman presides. An employer's representative nominated by the employing authority and an employee's representative nominated by the relevant union or association of employees also sits.
