= Sarah Huggett =

Australian lawyer and judge

Sarah Huggett is an Australian lawyer and judge who is the first female Chief Judge of the District Court of New South Wales.

== Early life and education ==
Sarah Huggett was born in Moree, one of eight children and the daughter of a police officer. She has a BA from Macquarie University and graduated from the University of Sydney with first class honours in law in 1991. Huggett completed a Master of Laws in 1995.

== Career ==
Huggett worked for the Office of the Director of Public Prosecutions (DPP) from 1993, including time on exchange in the United Kingdom with the Crown Prosecution Service. She was appointed a Crown prosecutor in 2001. Huggett was an adjunct professor at Loyola Law School in Los Angeles in 2009.

Huggett was appointed to the District Court of New South Wales in October 2012, working on the Criminal Trial Bench for twelve years. She oversaw a number of complex criminal cases, including many child sexual abuses cases. She was one of the judges on the court's Walama List, a trial of alternative sentencing procedures seeking to reduce Indigenous Australian incarceration. She was the Court's representative on the Consent Monitoring and Advisory Group Meeting and Chair of the Child Sexual Offence Evidence Program Steering Committee. She has said that lengthy sentences for sexual offences are "designed to punish the offender, denounce their conduct, protect the community and recognise the harm done to the victims".

Huggett was appointed to the New South Wales Supreme Court in November 2023. She was appointed Chief Judge of the District Court of NSW by Attorney General Michael Daley in April 2024, the first woman to hold the position.

=== Notable cases ===
Huggett was instructing solicitor to the DPP in the prosecution of Ivan Milat. She presided over the judge-only trial of convicted murderer Chris Dawson for carnal knowledge of a student in 2023. She imposed a maximum sentence of 32 years imprisonment on former MasterChef Australia contestant Paul Frost for child sexual offences. In 2023, she acquitted Sri Lankan cricketer Danushka Gunathilaka of rape through the act of stealthing in another judge alone trial.

== Personal life ==
Huggett has two children.
