= Government and Related Employees Appeals Tribunal of New South Wales =

The Government and Related Employees Appeals Tribunal of New South Wales (formerly commonly known as GREAT) was a tribunal established under the Government and Related Employees Appeal Tribunal Act 1980 (NSW). It heard certain promotional appeals and disciplinary appeals from employees of the Government of New South Wales. It commenced operation on 1 September 1980 and ceased operations on 1 July 2010, when its functions were subsumed by the Industrial Relations Commission of New South Wales.

== History ==
The tribunal commenced on 1 September 1980. It replaced the Crown Employees Appeal Board of New South Wales and the Promotions Appeal Tribunal of New South Wales constituted under section 69H of the Public Service (Promotion Appeals) Act 1902 (NSW).

== Jurisdiction ==
GREAT heard and determined appeals against decisions relating to the discipline and promotion of NSW public sector employees and employees of certain other statutory authorities. GREAT also heard promotion appeals and Hurt on Duty Claims by members of the New South Wales Police Force.

There were limited rights of appeal to the Supreme Court of New South Wales. NSW public sector employees often had the option of seeking reinstatement or re-employment in the New South Wales Industrial Relations Commission. However they were usually required to choose one or the other.

== Chairperson and members ==
The former chairperson, up until the Tribunal's dissolution, was Ms Patricia A Lynch. While an appeal panel consisted of the chairperson and two others, there were no other 'members' of the GREAT. The two 'others' sitting on an appeal panel consisted of one person nominated by the employer and one by the employee's union. The purpose was to get a 'balanced' decision on appeal.
