= Court of Arbitration (New South Wales) =

Disposition of simple purpose

The Court of Arbitration was the first court in New South Wales, Australia, which dealt exclusively with industrial relations disputes in the early twentieth century. Justice Lance Wright claims that it perhaps was the first court of its type in the world. The court was unique at that time as it was the first court of its type to deal with labour relations between employer and employees on a compulsory basis. Previous arbitration measures between employer and employee had been on a voluntary basis or had been based on the criminal justice system through the use of criminal penalties. The conventional economic model is that both employer and employee enjoy equal bargaining power to set wages and conditions. This asserts that both parties are able to agree on a fair market price for the cost of labour free from distortions. However, where employers or employees group together, these outcomes can be distorted particularly in “boom” or “bust” economic conditions. The purpose of the court was to change the manner in which employers and employees negotiated pay and conditions. It was an attempt to reduce the power imbalances between employer groups or employee unions that arose from using collective bargaining, and the resulting use of that market power to influence wages, and also to reduce the threat of lockout or strikes to achieve those ends.

== Background ==
Regulation of employment in the early nineteenth century was simply based on the common law concepts of contract. These concepts provided that an employer and employee were free to bargain as the nature and the terms of employment. Where either party breached the contract, there was recourse to the law in the normal courts of the land. This could prove to be an expensive exercise and a lengthy one as well. It was also possible under various “Master and Servant Acts” for employees who broke employment contracts to be prosecuted for a breach of the criminal law. In this situation, either the employer or employee could be fined or imprisoned. Dr Geoffrey Partington outlines an example in 1858 where German masons who were brought to Australia to work on the Victorian railways, broke their contracts after being persuaded to work for another employer. This was due to a shortage in the supply of experienced masons in Australia. The masons were imprisoned as a result of their breach.

A maritime strike in 1890 led to the introduction in 1892 of the Trades Dispute Conciliation and Arbitration Act. This Act provided the first legislated non-common law arbitration scheme for disputes between employers and employees. The new law required the agreement of both employer and employee to engage in conciliation or arbitration. However, a declining labour market meant that employers were not prepared to accept arbitration and Patmore reports that only two of twenty two cases under that law were settled. Unions found the legislation ineffective in getting employers to the bargaining table.

Disillusionment with the system led to a royal commission. In 1899 a new law made under the Conciliation and Arbitration Act which gave the Minister for Labour of the New South Wales Government the power to mediate any industrial dispute. However, this also failed because employers were not legally bound to follow the directions of the Minister. In proposing change, Bernhard Wise said:

“I believe that those who have most experience of courts of law will be the first to admit that their machinery is unsuitable for dealing with these subjects. Not only are they overburdened with business – and so there would be delay where urgency was of the utmost importance if we would prevent industrial warfare – but their forms of procedure and their rules do not readily lend themselves to dealing with these delicate questions, half of fact or entirely of fact, that would have to be determined by the tribunal called upon to interpret an industrial agreement. It is not our judges who determine facts under our system, but our juries; and surely everyone will see that there would be a waste of time, a needless cost, and in the end a most unsatisfactory result, if it were necessary to refer on every occasion to a jury, or even to a bench of lawyers, the question whether or not an industrial agreement had been broken, or whether the altered conditions of a trade required the rate of wages to be lowered or raised.”

== Establishment of the court ==
The failure of the previous systems led the New South Wales Government to introduce a new means of dealing with industrial disputes. Industrial disputes were now to be determined by compulsory arbitration in a court, and not through voluntary conciliation or through wage boards. The Court of Arbitration was established under the Industrial Arbitration Act 1901, which came into force on 10 December 1901. Certain procedural matters had to be attended to before the court could formally sit. Once this was done, the court first sat on 16 May 1902. The court was a court of record. The court was constituted by a president and two members. One of the members was to be an employer representative and the other an employee representative. The president had to be a judge of the Supreme Court of New South Wales. The first President of the Court was Justice Henry Cohen.

The Court had jurisdiction to hear and determine any industrial dispute or matter referred to it by an industrial union or the registrar of the court. The court could make decisions on wages and conditions even when both parties did not agree. This was to be made in the form of “awards”. Industrial agreements could still be made voluntarily but now, they could also be registered with the court. Unions had to registered to participate in the court, and their registration possibly led to an increase in membership from 58,200 in 1902 to 68,600 in 1904. The new laws attracted international attention when it was claimed that they were "the most radical arbitration law in the world".

=== Notable cases ===
The first case heard by the court was a dispute between the Newcastle Wharf Laborers’ Union and the Newcastle and Hunter River Steamship Company. The court found the employer guilty of locking out its employees and it was ordered that certain union members should be employed. The court also ordered the union to provide employees to the company, and in default, the company was able to use non-union labour. Other cases heard by the court included cases concerning the Cigar Makers' Union, the Tailoresses' Union, the Saddle and Harness Makers' Union, the New South Wales Clickers' Union, the Boot Operators' and Rough Stuff Cutters' Union, the Journeymen Coopers' Union and the Trolley Draymen and Carters' Union.

In 1905 President Charles Heydon handed down a decision in the Sawmillers' case in which he awarded a living wage, predating the Harvester case by two years. His minimum wage was intended to enable "every worker however humble … to lead a human life, to marry and bring up a family and maintain them and himself with at any rate some small degree of comfort", governed by the degree of prosperity in the industry involved.

=== Apprenticeships ===
The court was the first court in Australia to regulate apprenticeships. Unions at the time usually advanced the argument in court that apprentice numbers should be restricted so that they could be properly trained. President Charles Heydon rejected this argument and considered that it was only a way of unions restricting the number of members in the industry. At the same time, Heydon required apprentices to attend proper trade classes to learn their trade. Unfortunately, wage rates weren’t regulated by the court, and this appears to have occurred because neither the unions nor the employers sought it.

The Court of Arbitration in its short life had established a precedent for the regulation of apprenticeships which no other previous Australian court had done before. However, the courts impact was limited by the few cases it had the opportunity to hear before its abolition.

=== Appeals ===
Section 32 of the Act provided that there was to be no right of appeal from the court. That appeared to be the intention of the New South Wales government. Parliamentarian Bernhard Wise in Parliament said:

“The [court’s] decision is final – absolutely final. The right of appeal to the Privy Council will remain, in the exercise of her Majesty’s prerogative. There will be no appeal, however, to the Federal Court, (Note: a reference to the High Court of Australia, not the current Federal Court) or to the Supreme Court of New South Wales”.

However, in 1904, the High Court in Clancy v Butchers Shop Employees Union, held that proceedings by way of prohibition could be taken to the Supreme Court of New South Wales on matters where the court had exceeded its jurisdiction.

== Industrial Court ==
The court was replaced in 1908 by the Industrial Court which was established by the Industrial Disputes Act. This was in part due to the High Court’s decision in allowing decisions of the court to be challenged. Sexton refers to a speech by parliamentarian George Beeby where he said:

“Unfortunately, the High Court, which, with all respect to the learned gentlemen that constitute it, is entirely out of touch with the industrial affairs of this country and out of sympathy with industrial unions, took a strict view of the law, and gave a certain judgment, whereas it could have given just as logical a judgment in favour of the trade-union that had the case before the court”.

Charles Heydon, the former President was appointed the judge of the Court, assisted by a system of Industrial Boards.

== Court of Industrial Arbitration ==
The Court was re-constructed for a second time in 1912 by the Industrial Arbitration Act, with Charles Heydon continuing as judge. The Industrial Boards were replaced by Conciliation Committees.

== Industrial Commission ==
The Court of Industrial Arbitration was abolished by the Industrial Arbitration (Amendment) Act of 1926, replaced by an Industrial Commission which was the predecessor of the Industrial Relations Commission of New South Wales.

== Sources ==
- Ryan, Edna Minna (1984). Two-thirds of a Man. Women and Arbitration in New South Wales 1902-08. Sydney, Australia: Hale & Iremonger.
- Cockfield, Sandra (May 2006). "Arbitration and the Workplace: A Case Study of Metters' Stovemakers, 1902–22". Labour History. 90. Archived from the original on 29 June 2006.
