= Compensation Court of New South Wales =

The Compensation Court of New South Wales was a court in the Australian State of New South Wales. It had unlimited jurisdiction within the State in workers' compensation matters.

It was abolished on 31 December 2003 and replaced by the Workers Compensation Commission of New South Wales for most workers' compensation matters. The jurisdiction in respect of the injury of police and miners was transferred to the District Court of New South Wales. The Compensation Court Judges all became District Court Judges at this time.

== History ==
Workers' compensation was first introduced into New South Wales with the introduction of the Workmen's Compensation Act 1910 (NSW). The Act applied to dangerous occupations in which personal injury arose out of an accident or in the course of employment.

The Workers Compensation Act 1926 (NSW) expanded the role of workers' compensation in the State. It introduced compulsory insurance for employers, and it also established the first specialized workers' compensation tribunal in Australia, being the Workers Compensation Commission of New South Wales.

The Commission exercised both judicial and executive power. It was constituted with a judicial member and two lay members. The Commission also had the power to license and supervise the operations of insurers.

In 1984, the Workers' Compensation Commission was replaced by two bodies, the State Compensation Board of New South Wales and the Compensation Court of New South Wales. The Board took over administrative and licensing functions, which the Commission formerly had, and the Court continued to exercise the judicial functions.

== Structure and jurisdiction ==
The Court then operated under the now-repealed Compensation Court Act 1984 (NSW). The Governor could appoint a Chief Judge of the Court, Judges of the Court, and Commissioners. The Chief Judge and the Judges of the Court could hear any claim before the Court. Commissioners were limited to hearing claims of less than $40,000. A Principal Registrar and registrars of the Court could also be appointed.

== Chief Judges ==
- Judge Ralph Perdriau, Chairman of the Commission 1926–1950;
- Judge Alfred Conybeare, Chairman 1950–1972;
- Judge Chris Langsworth, Chairman 1972–1982;
- Judge Frank McGrath, Chairman of the Commission 1982–1984 and Chief Judge of the Court 1984–1993;
- Justice Michael Campbell, Chief Judge of the Court 1994–2003.
