= Local Court of New South Wales =

Australian court

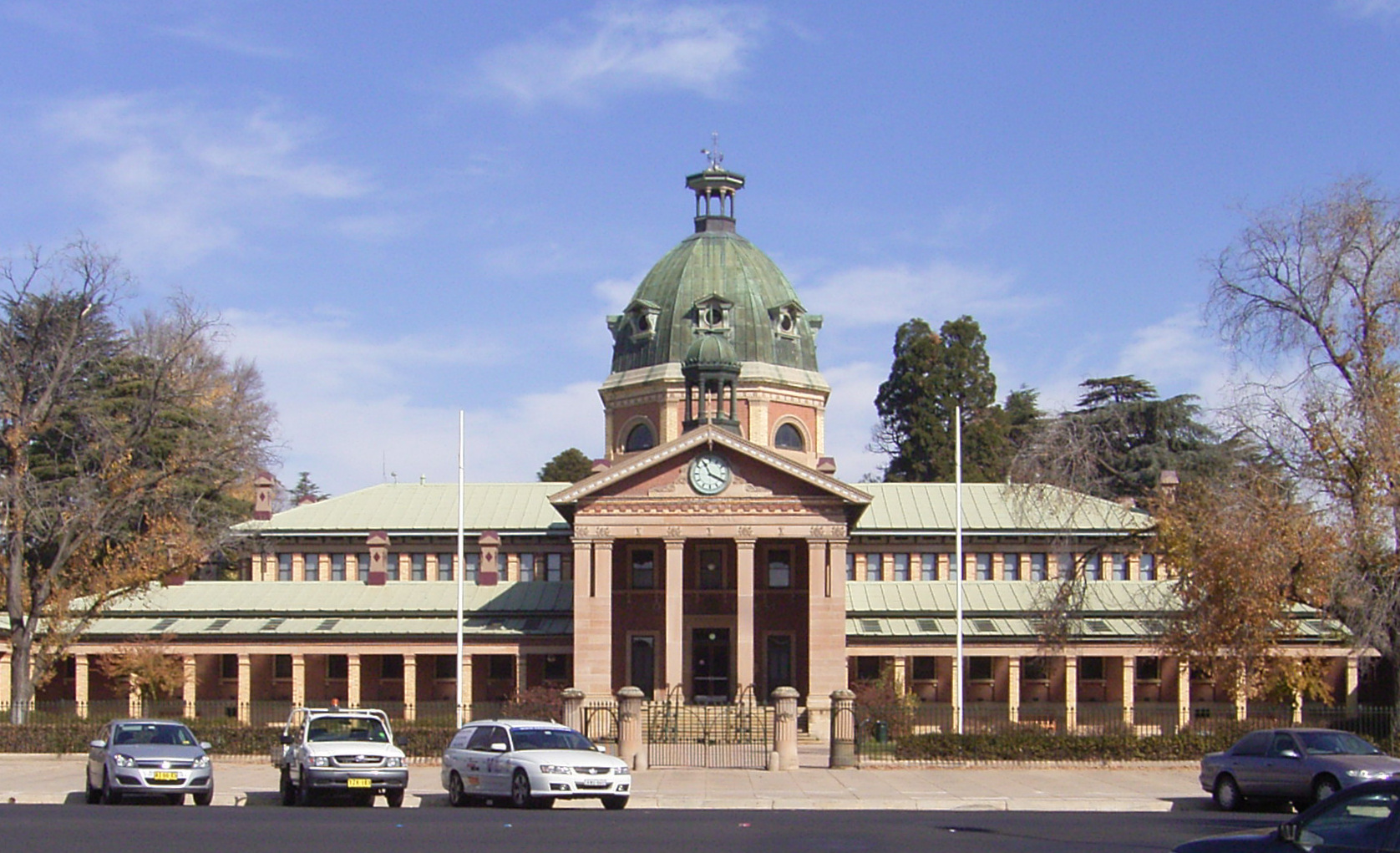
- James Barnet designed Bathurst Courthouse, completed in 1880, one of the sites for the Local Court.
- Jurisdiction: New South Wales
- Location: ~160 branches across New South Wales
- Composition method: Vice-regal appointment upon Premier's nomination, following advice of the Attorney-General and Cabinet
- Authorised by: Parliament of New South Wales via the Local Court Act 2007 (NSW)
- Appeals to: District Court of New South Wales; Supreme Court of New South Wales
- Judge term length: mandatory retirement by age of 75
- Website: localcourt.nsw.gov.au

Chief Magistrate
- Currently: Judge Michael Allen
- Since: 2024

The Local Court of New South Wales is the lowest court in the judicial hierarchy of the Australian state of New South Wales. Formerly known as the Court of Petty Sessions and the Magistrates Court, there are more than 160 branches across New South Wales where the Local Court has jurisdiction to deal with the majority of minor civil and criminal matters.

== History ==
In 1788, following the landing of the First Fleet and establishment of the Colony of New South Wales, the power and authority of the first criminal and civil courts in the Colony of New South Wales were vested by the Charter of Justice.

The first Court of Petty Sessions' courthouse was constructed in 1821 at Windsor, 56 kilometres (35 mi) northwest of Sydney.

The court has also been known as the Magistrates Court.

== Structure and jurisdiction ==
There are more than 160 branches across New South Wales where the Local Court has jurisdiction to deal with the majority of minor civil and criminal matters.

The Local Court of New South Wales hears civil matters of a monetary value of up to $100,000; mental health matters; family law and/or child care matters; adult criminal proceedings, including committal hearings, and summary prosecutions for summary offences (i.e., offences of a less serious nature) and indictable offences; licensing issues (as the Licensing Court); industrial matters; and mining matters. In addition to this, the Local Court, via its Small Claims Division, hears claims for less than $10,000 and also hears applications for Apprehended Violence Orders (AVOs). The local court has limited jurisdiction under the Family Law Act 1975 (Cth) to hear and determine family law matters. The local court can deal with applications such as property settlements and residence orders.

A magistrate can sentence offenders to imprisonment for no more than two years per offence, and no more than the maximum of five years for multiple offences.

The Chief Magistrate of the Local Court is Judge Michael Allen, former Deputy Chief Magistrate, who was appointed in July 2024. Judge Allen succeeded Judge Peter Johnstone, appointed in 2021.

The Coroner's Court of New South Wales is a division within the Local Court that investigates violent or unnatural deaths, suspicious fires and/or explosions, but it cannot make orders to punish offenders. Coroners may, however, terminate their proceedings and pass on their findings onto state or federal Directors of Public Prosecutions for initiation of proceedings in another court at their discretion.

=== Functioning ===
Matters are heard before a single magistrate sitting without a jury, addressed as "Your Honour" or "Sir" (but no longer "Your worship"). From 2026, judicial officers of the Local Court of New South Wales are formally designated as judges, replacing the previous title of magistrate. This change followed amendments to the Local Court Act 2007 introduced by the Minns Government. The change in title reflects the evolving role of the Local Court, which handles a high volume of matters and increasingly complex cases. In recent years, the court has experienced significant growth in workload, with hundreds of thousands of matters commenced annually. The former title of “magistrate” has historical origins linked to earlier court structures, when judicial officers were drawn from the public service and presided over Courts of Petty Sessions. However, Local Court judicial officers have been required to possess formal legal qualifications for several decades. New South Wales joins other Australian jurisdictions, including the Northern Territory and the Federal Circuit and Family Court of Australia, in adopting the title of “judge” for officers in courts of equivalent jurisdiction.

The Local Court has no jurisdiction for claims in equity. On appeal, matters may be heard by the District Court of New South Wales including appeals against the sentence or conviction decided in the Local Court.

== Other courts ==
The Children's Court is another specialist court that deals with cases involving children, including criminal, education and care and protection cases. The Children's Court sits at the Local Court level of the NSW court hierarchy, but is not part of the Local Court, and is instead its own independent jurisdiction led by a President (who is a Judge of the District Court) and composed of Children's Magistrates (who are specially trained magistrates appointed from the Local Court bench by the Chief Magistrate of the Local Court, in consultation with the President of the Children's Court). The Children's Court is a closed court. While the media may attend proceedings, they may not publish any details that may identify any children or young people involved in court proceedings.

== See also ==
- Courthouses in New South Wales
- List of New South Wales courts and tribunals
- Victims Compensation Tribunal
