= Industrial Relations Commission of New South Wales =

Method of industrial dispute resolution in Australia

- Established: 2 September 1996
- Jurisdiction: New South Wales, Australia
- Authorised by: Parliament of New South Wales via the Industrial Relations Act 1996 (NSW)
- Website: www.irc.justice.nsw.gov.au

President
- Currently: Hon Justice Ingmar Taylor

The Industrial Relations Commission of New South Wales conciliates and arbitrates industrial disputes, sets conditions of employment and fixes wages and salaries by making industrial awards, approves enterprise agreements and decides other industrial matters in New South Wales, a state of Australia. The Commission was established with effect from 2 September 1996 pursuant to the Industrial Relations Act 1996.

== History ==
The Court of Arbitration (New South Wales) was established in 1901 pursuant to the Industrial Arbitration Act 1901 (NSW). The name and function of the state's industrial tribunal has since undergone several changes. It was renamed the Industrial Court in 1908, and the Court of Industrial Arbitration (New South Wales) in 1912. The Industrial Arbitration (Amendment) Act, 1926 (NSW) abolished the Court of Industrial Arbitration and set up the Industrial Commission of New South Wales, which was abolished in turn by the Industrial Relations Act 1991 (NSW) and replaced by the Industrial Relations Commission and a separate Industrial Court.

The Industrial Relations Act, 1996 (NSW) established a new Industrial Relations Commission which had an arbitral and judicial function. When it was in Court Session, the Commission was called the Industrial Court of New South Wales. In 2016 the Industrial Court was abolished and its powers transferred to the Supreme Court of NSW.

The Industrial Court was revived by the Industrial Relations Amendment Act 2023 (NSW) and recommenced operation on 1 July 2024.

== Jurisdiction ==
The Commission has jurisdiction in relation to public sector and Local Government employees in New South Wales. The Industrial Relations (Commonwealth Powers) Act, 2009 (NSW) transferred jurisdiction over private sector workers to the federal relations system.

The Commission has the function of setting remuneration and other conditions of employment for employees, resolving industrial disputes, hearing and determining other industrial matters such as claims for unfair dismissal, unfair contract, victimisation and disciplinary appeals. The Minister for Industrial Relations may refer any matter to the Commission for the Commission to inquire and report upon.

In exercising its jurisdiction, the Commission must take into account the public interest, the objects of the Industrial Relations Act 1996 (NSW), the state of the economy of New South Wales and the likely effect of its decisions on the economy, and, for the exercise of a function about public sector employees, the Government's fiscal position and outlook and the likely effect of its decisions on that fiscal position and outlook.

The Commission may sit as a Full Bench for the purposes of hearing appeals against the decisions of single members, making a State Decision which affects the employment of New South Wales employees or to determine difficult questions referred by a single member to the Full Bench for determination. The Industrial Court can also sit as a Full Bench to hear an appeal against the decision of a single Industrial Court judge or an Industrial Magistrate of the Local Court.

== Composition ==
The Commission consists of a President, Vice President, Deputy President and Commissioners appointed by the Governor of New South Wales. The President, Vice President and Deputy Presidents are referred to as Presidential Members and are also Judges of the Industrial Court of New South Wales.

A Full Bench of the Commission consists of at least three members including at least one Presidential Member. A Full Bench of the Industrial Court consists of three Presidential Members sitting as Judges.

The Commission's current composition is:

Position	Name	Notes
President	The Hon. Justice Ingmar Taylor	
Vice President	The Hon. Justice David Chin	
Deputy President	The Hon. Justice Jane Paingakulam	
Senior Commissioner	Nichola Constant	
Commissioner	Janine Webster	
Commissioner	Christopher Muir	
Commissioner	Daniel O'Sullivan	
Commissioner	Janet McDonald	

== See also ==
- List of New South Wales courts and tribunals
- South Australian Employment Tribunal
- Western Australian Industrial Relations Commission
