= District Court of New South Wales =

Intermediate court of New South Wales

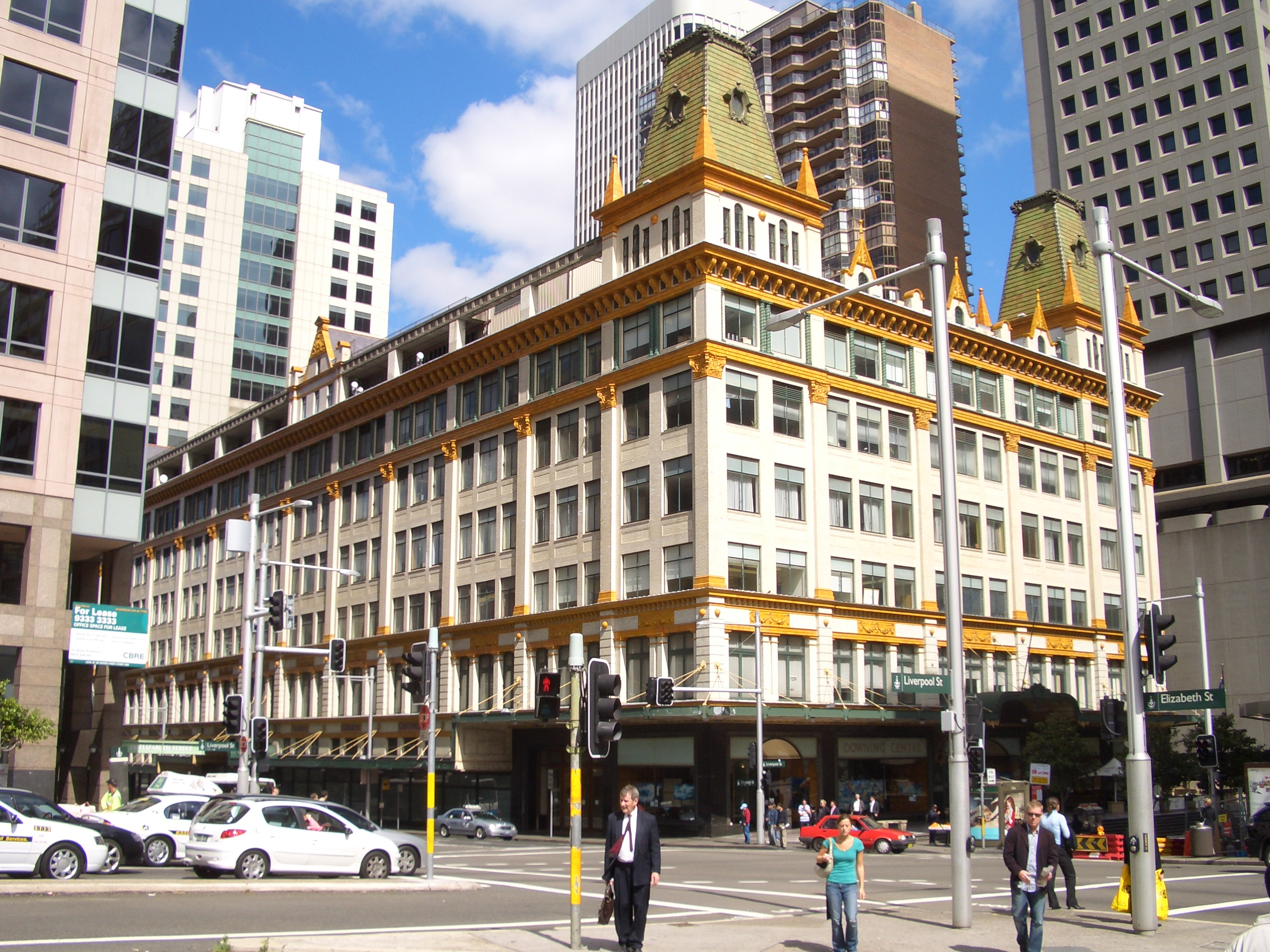
- Downing Centre, a seat of the District Court in Sydney CBD
- Established: 1858
- Jurisdiction: New South Wales
- Location: Full time sittings are held in the Sydney CBD, and at Parramatta, Penrith, Campbelltown, Newcastle, Gosford, Wollongong and Lismore. Part time sittings are held in a range of major regional centres.
- Composition method: Vice-regal appointment upon nomination by the Premier following the advice of the Attorney General and Cabinet
- Authorised by: New South Wales Parliament via the: District Court Act 1973 (NSW)
- Appeals to: Supreme Court of NSW; NSW Court of Criminal Appeal
- Appeals from: Local Court of NSW
- Website: districtcourt.nsw.gov.au

Chief Judge
- Currently: Sarah Huggett
- Since: 2024

The District Court of New South Wales is the intermediate court in the judicial hierarchy of the Australian state of New South Wales. It is a trial court and has an appellate jurisdiction. In addition, the Judges of the Court preside over a range of tribunals. In its criminal jurisdiction, the Court may deal with all serious criminal offences except murder, treason and piracy. The Court's civil jurisdiction is generally limited to claims less than A$1,250,000.

The District Court has had its current structure since reforms during 1973 which created a single court with a statewide criminal and civil jurisdiction. The Chief Judge of the District Court, since 2014, is the Honourable Justice Sarah Huggett.

== History ==
By 1850, the court system in the Colony of New South Wales consisted of:

- The Supreme Court of New South Wales which, under the Third Charter of Justice sealed in 1823, had a criminal and civil jurisdiction similar to that of the superior Courts of England;
- Courts of General and Quarter Sessions which could deal with "crimes and misdemeanours not punishable by death";
- Court of Requests in Sydney and the County of Cumberland, with a civil jurisdiction not exceeding £30; and
- Courts of Petty Sessions, which dealt with criminal misdemeanours in a summary way and had a civil jurisdiction up to £10 (or £30 if the defendant consented).

The population of NSW increased as a result of the gold rush of 1851 and became more dispersed. Litigation grew as the Colony prospered, and crime was not declining. The Supreme Court began to fall seriously into arrears, and this was not helped by the fact that it did not visit a lot of towns. Courts of Quarter Sessions were also few in number and had no civil jurisdiction. By the mid-1850s there were calls for a revision of the court system, to meet the growing needs of the Colony. As a result, the parliament passed the District Courts Act 1858 (NSW). This Act established district courts, which divided the Colony into districts and created a court of record for each district with a civil jurisdiction up to £200, to replace the Courts of Requests. judges of the district courts were also appointed as chairman of any court of quarter sessions or general sessions, to be held within the limits of that district.

The purpose of the Act was briefly described as:

District Courts were established by the Legislature for the purpose of simplifying legal proceedings in the recovery of amounts under £200, and lessening the expenses of attending such proceedings, as well as to relieving the Supreme Court of some portion of the overwhelming civil business which the rapid progress of the colony had lately engendered. The Act providing for the institution of these Courts also extended the jurisdiction of Courts of General and Quarter Sessions of the Peace, and prepared the way for a great increase in their numbers, under the presidency of District Court Judges as Chairmen, whereby criminal proceedings have been much facilitated, especially in the more distant and outlying portions of the country.

The jurisdiction of the district courts was increased from time to time. Incremental changes were introduced after World War II. The position of Chairman of the District Court Judges was introduced in 1950 to exercise administrative functions in relation to the courts similar to role of the Chief Justice in the Supreme Court, from which time, instead of being appointed to a specific district, judges were appointed to "all district courts" but would be assigned to work in specific district courts. The intermediate courts were reformed in 1973 by the District Court Act 1973, which abolished the courts of quarter sessions and each of the district courts and amalgamated their jurisdictions into a single District Court of New South Wales, with a statewide criminal and civil jurisdiction.

== Structure and jurisdiction ==
=== Criminal jurisdiction ===
The District Court deals with a wide range of criminal matters. The only charges that the District Court cannot deal with are murder or treason, which must be dealt with by the Supreme Court. The types of criminal matters dealt with by the District Court include:

- offences against the person: including offences like manslaughter, malicious wounding to inflict grievous bodily harm and dangerous driving;
- assaults: including offences like common assault, assault occasioning actual bodily harm and assault of police officers;
- sexual assaults: including offences like sexual assault, indecent assault and carnal knowledge;
- offences relating to property: including offences like robbery from the person, break, enter and steal, larceny (stealing) and embezzlement;
- offences involving illicit drug use: including offences like the importation of heroin and other drugs into Australia, prohibited supply of drugs and possess prohibited drug; and
- offences involving fraud: including offences like passing valueless cheques, obtaining money by deception and forgery.

=== Civil jurisdiction ===
In its civil jurisdiction the Court may deal with all motor accident cases, irrespective of the amount claimed and other claims to a maximum amount of A$750,000, although it may deal with matters exceeding this amount if the parties consent. In addition, the Court may deal with equitable claims or demands for recovery of money or damages for amounts not exceeding A$750,000. The Court is also empowered to deal with applications under the Property (Relationships) Act 1984, the Succession Act 2006, that involve amounts, or property to the value of, not more than A$250,000.

=== Residual jurisdiction ===
Most of the work in residual jurisdiction is handled by the Workers Compensation Commission. However, some matters that are handled by the District Court include:

- the Police Act 1990 (NSW) concerning police officers "hurt on duty" and the Police Regulation (Superannuation) Act 1906 (NSW) concerning the payment of superannuation benefits to police officers
- payment under the Police Regulations (Superannuation) Act 1906 (NSW), paid to STC (the SAS Trustee Corporation continued under the Superannuation Administration Act 1996 (NSW)) and special risk benefits payable by the Commissioner of Police
- the Workers' Compensation Act 1987 (NSW) concerning workers in or about a coal mine
- the Workers Compensation (Dust Diseases) Act 1942 (NSW)
- the Sporting Injuries Insurance Scheme
- the Workers' Compensation (Bush Fire, Emergency & Rescue Services) Act 1987 (NSW)

=== Appellate jurisdiction ===
The District Court has appellate jurisdiction for decisions made by the Local Court of New South Wales and the Children's Court of New South Wales, where a review of both sentencing and convictions may be heard before the Court. Appeals against District Court decisions are made to the Supreme Court, the Court of Appeal or the Court of Criminal Appeal.

== See also ==
- List of Judges of the District Court of NSW
- List of New South Wales courts and tribunals
