= Executive Council of New South Wales =

Council of senior ministers in New South Wales, Australia

- Coat of Arms of the State of New South Wales

Agency overview
- Formed: 1825
- Jurisdiction: State of New South Wales
- Headquarters: Chief Secretary's Building
- Agency executives: Margaret Beazley, Governor of New South Wales; Vice-President of the Executive Council, Ron Hoenig

The Executive Council of New South Wales (informally and more commonly, the Cabinet of New South Wales) is the cabinet of the Australian state of New South Wales, consisting of the premier and ministers, and presided over by the governor.

== Role and history ==
The Executive Council was created within the Royal Letters Patent commissioning Sir Ralph Darling as Governor on 19 December 1825, which would act as the governor's executive advisory council alongside the Legislative Council. In the early Crown colony of New South Wales prior to full self-government in 1856, the Executive Council was appointed by the Governor and included military and judicial officials, their role that of the Governor's cabinet, similar to the present except that the Governor took part in cabinet meetings and political decisions, whereas modern Governors do not. The colonial Legislative Council, established in 1824, was subordinate to the Governor and the Council and served more as a sounding-board than a legislative body.

Made up of members of the New South Wales Legislative Assembly and the New South Wales Legislative Council, the cabinet is similar in structure and role to the Cabinet of Australia. As federal and state responsibilities differ there are a number of different portfolios between the federal and state governments, most prominent being the absence of foreign or defence portfolios in state governments. As required by Section 35CA of the Constitution Act 1902, all prospective Executive Councillors must take the pledge of loyalty or oath of allegiance and oath of office. Once sworn in, the members of the council are entitled to bear the title "The Honourable". Once leaving office however, they must relinquish it unless they have served more than three years on the council or have been specifically approved to bear it for life by the monarch on the advice of the council. All retentions of the title must, however, be approved by Royal proclamation.

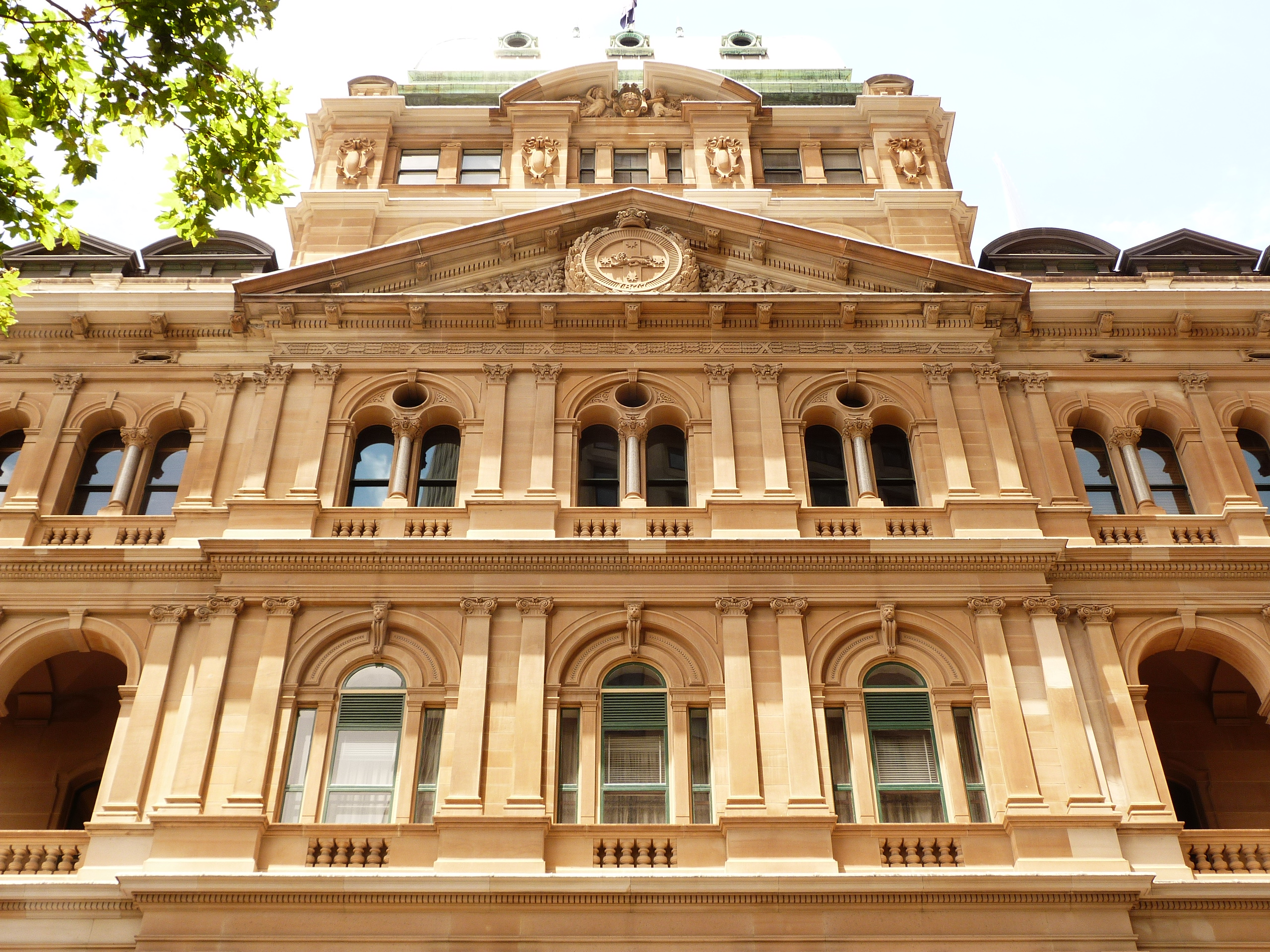
The Chief Secretary's Building on Macquarie Street contains the Executive Council Chamber.

While the Governor acts as the President of the Executive Council, a minister is appointed to be Vice-President of the Executive Council, as set forth in section 35D of the constitution, to act as chair in the absence of the governor and to facilitate the agenda and reports of members before the council and the crown.

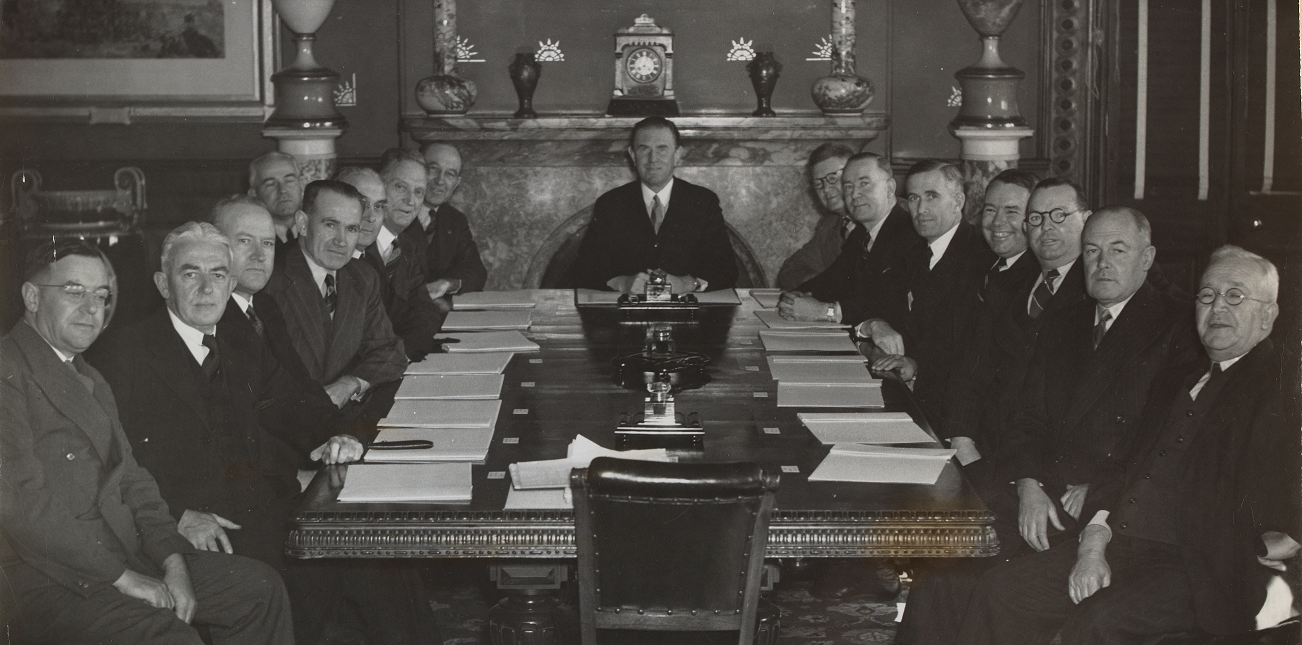
The new McKell ministry's first council meeting in the Executive Council Chamber, 16 May 1941.

Meetings of the Council almost always consist of the Governor (or their representative; such as the Lieutenant Governor), the Official Secretary to the Governor (ex-officio the Secretary of the Executive Council) and a quorum of councillors, which is set at two. The Governor of New South Wales, as representative of the Queen in Right of New South Wales, heads the council, and is referred to as the Governor in Council. Other members of the Cabinet, who advise, or minister, the vice-regal, are selected by the Premier of New South Wales and appointed by the Governor. Most cabinet ministers are the head of a ministry, but this is not always the case. Section 13B(6) of the Constitution provides that the Vice-President shall be an elected member of the parliament, which by convention is always a member of the Legislative Council and, more specifically, the leader of the government in the council.

== King-in-Council ==
The Government of New South Wales, which is formally referred to as His Majesty's Government is defined by the Constitution of New South Wales (1902) as the Queen acting on the advice of the Executive Council, or sometimes the Governor-in-Council, referring to the Governor as the King's representative. The sovereign or his viceroy govern by issuing Orders in Council, certified by the royal or viceroyal sign-manual and the Great Seal of New South Wales. In the construct of constitutional monarchy and responsible government, this is done on ministerial advice that is typically binding, though the sovereign and his or her representative may unilaterally use these powers in exceptional constitutional crisis situations.
