= Electoral results for the district of Canterbury =

Election results for Canterbury, New South Wales, Australia

Canterbury, an electoral district of the Legislative Assembly in the Australian state of New South Wales has had two incarnations, from 1859 to 1920 and 1927 to the present.

== Members for Canterbury ==
=== First incarnation (1859–1920) ===
Election	Member	Party	Member	Party				
1859	Edward Flood	None	Samuel Lyons	None				
1860 by	John Lucas	None	Samuel Lyons	None				
1860	John Lucas	None	Edward Raper	None				
1864–65	John Lucas	None	James Oatley	None				
1865 by	James Pemell	None	James Oatley	None				
1868 by	Richard Hill	None	James Oatley	None				
1869–70	Richard Hill	None	Montagu Stephen	None				
1871 by	Richard Hill	None	John Lucas	None				
1872	Richard Hill	None	John Lucas	None				
1874–75	Richard Hill	None	John Lucas	None				
1877	Sir Henry Parkes	None	John Lucas	None				
1878 by	Sir Henry Parkes	None	John Lucas	None				
1880	William Pigott	None	William Henson	None	Member	Party		
1882	William Pigott	None	Henry Moses	None	Septimus Stephen	None		
1884 by	Mark Hammond	None	Henry Moses	None	Septimus Stephen	None		
1885 by	Mark Hammond	None	William Henson	None	Septimus Stephen	None	Member	Party
1885	Mark Hammond	None	William Henson	None	Septimus Stephen	None	William Judd	None
1887	William Davis	Free Trade	William Henson	Free Trade	Alexander Hutchison	Free Trade	Joseph Carruthers	Free Trade
1889	James Wilshire	Free Trade	John Wheeler	Free Trade	Alexander Hutchison	Free Trade	Joseph Carruthers	Free Trade
1891	Cornelius Danahey	Labor	John Wheeler	Free Trade	Thomas Bavister	Labor	Joseph Carruthers	Free Trade
1891 re-count	Cornelius Danahey	Labor	James Eve	Free Trade	Thomas Bavister	Labor	Joseph Carruthers	Free Trade
1894	Varney Parkes	Free Trade						
1895 by	Varney Parkes	Free Trade						
1895	Varney Parkes	Free Trade						
1898	Varney Parkes	Free Trade						
June 1900 by	Sydney Smith	Free Trade						
July 1900 by	Thomas Taylor	Independent						
1901	Thomas Mackenzie	Liberal Reform						
1904	Thomas Mackenzie	Liberal Reform						
1907	Varney Parkes	Independent Liberal / Liberal Reform						
1910	Varney Parkes	Liberal Reform						
1913	Henry Peters	Labor						
1914 by	George Cann	Labor						
1917	George Cann	Labor						
=== Second incarnation (1927–present) ===
Election	Member	Party						
1927	Arthur Tonge	Labor						
1930	Arthur Tonge	Labor						
1932	Edward Hocking	United Australia						
1935	Arthur Tonge	Labor						
1938	Arthur Tonge	Labor						
1941	Arthur Tonge	Labor						
1944	Arthur Tonge	Labor						
1947	Arthur Tonge	Labor						
1950	Arthur Tonge	Labor						
1953	Arthur Tonge	Labor						
1956	Arthur Tonge	Labor						
1959	Arthur Tonge	Labor						
1962	Kevin Stewart	Labor						
1965	Kevin Stewart	Labor						
1968	Kevin Stewart	Labor						
1971	Kevin Stewart	Labor						
1973	Kevin Stewart	Labor						
1976	Kevin Stewart	Labor						
1978	Kevin Stewart	Labor						
1981	Kevin Stewart	Labor						
1984	Kevin Stewart	Labor						
1986 by	Kevin Moss	Labor						
1988	Kevin Moss	Labor						
1991	Kevin Moss	Labor						
1995	Kevin Moss	Labor						
1999	Kevin Moss	Labor						
2003	Linda Burney	Labor						
2007	Linda Burney	Labor						
2011	Linda Burney	Labor						
2015	Linda Burney	Labor						
2016 by	Sophie Cotsis	Labor						
2019	Sophie Cotsis	Labor						
2023	Sophie Cotsis	Labor						

== Election results ==
=== Elections in the 2020s ===
==== 2023 ====
2023 New South Wales state election: Canterbury
Party	Candidate	Votes	%	±%
Labor	Sophie Cotsis	28,892	59.8	+6.2
Liberal	Nemr Boumansour	8,341	17.3	−12.5
Greens	Bradley Schott	4,354	9.0	−2.2
Liberal Democrats	Vanessa Hadchiti	3,941	8.2	+8.2
Sustainable Australia	Joe Sinacori	1,379	2.9	+2.9
Animal Justice	Kacey King	1,376	2.8	+2.6
Total formal votes		48,283	95.3	−0.1
Informal votes		2,386	4.7	+0.1
Turnout		50,669	86.5	−0.2
Two-party-preferred result
Labor	Sophie Cotsis	32,829	75.8	+10.5
Liberal	Nemr Boumansour	10,494	24.2	−10.5
Labor hold		Swing	+10.5	

=== Elections in the 2010s ===
==== 2019 ====
2019 New South Wales state election: Canterbury
Party	Candidate	Votes	%	±%
Labor	Sophie Cotsis	24,674	50.61	+0.37
Liberal	Matt Harrison	15,376	31.54	+4.54
Greens	Linda Eisler	6,146	12.61	+2.93
Christian Democrats	Fatima Figueira	2,560	5.25	−4.94
Total formal votes		48,756	95.59	+0.38
Informal votes		2,247	4.41	−0.38
Turnout		51,003	89.22	−0.46
Two-party-preferred result
Labor	Sophie Cotsis	28,358	63.03	−2.66
Liberal	Matt Harrison	16,634	36.97	+2.66
Labor hold		Swing	−2.66	

==== 2016 by-election ====
2016 Canterbury by-election Saturday 12 November
Party	Candidate	Votes	%	±%
Labor	Sophie Cotsis	27,993	65.5	+15.2
Christian Democrats	Branka Kouroushis	8,397	19.6	+9.4
Greens	Kristian Bodell	6,393	14.9	+5.3
Total formal votes		42,783	95.4	+0.2
Informal votes		2,075	4.6	−0.2
Turnout		44,858	78.5	−15.9
Two-candidate-preferred result
Labor	Sophie Cotsis	31,866	77.8	+12.1
Christian Democrats	Branka Kouroushis	9,092	22.2	+22.2
Labor hold		Swing	N/A	

Linda Burney (Labor) resigned.

==== 2015 ====
2015 New South Wales state election: Canterbury
Party	Candidate	Votes	%	±%
Labor	Linda Burney	23,929	50.2	+1.4
Liberal	Nomiky Panayiotakis	12,859	27.0	−9.9
Christian Democrats	Tony Issa	4,854	10.2	+6.0
Greens	Linda Eisler	4,608	9.7	+0.3
No Land Tax	Tony Maiorana	1,386	2.9	+2.9
Total formal votes		47,636	95.2	+0.3
Informal votes		2,395	4.8	−0.3
Turnout		50,031	89.7	−3.2
Two-party-preferred result
Labor	Linda Burney	27,663	65.7	+8.3
Liberal	Nomiky Panayiotakis	14,447	34.3	−8.3
Labor hold		Swing	+8.3	

==== 2011 ====
2011 New South Wales state election: Canterbury
Party	Candidate	Votes	%	±%
Labor	Linda Burney	21,417	47.2	−9.9
Liberal	Ken Nam	16,115	35.5	+17.2
Greens	Marc Rerceretnam	6,186	13.6	+0.6
Christian Democrats	Albert Fam	1,673	3.7	+0.5
Total formal votes		45,391	95.9	+0.1
Informal votes		1,932	4.1	−0.1
Turnout		47,323	91.9	−0.4
Two-party-preferred result
Labor	Linda Burney	24,356	58.3	−18.8
Liberal	Ken Nam	17,393	41.7	+18.8
Labor hold		Swing	−18.8	

=== Elections in the 2000s ===
==== 2007 ====
2007 New South Wales state election: Canterbury
Party	Candidate	Votes	%	±%
Labor	Linda Burney	24,634	57.1	+1.6
Liberal	Philip Mansour	7,907	18.3	+2.1
Greens	Christine Donayre	5,629	13.0	+1.6
Unity	Jing Ren	2,809	6.5	+0.6
Christian Democrats	Ehab Hennien	1,359	3.1	+3.0
AAFI	Alan Cronin	822	1.9	+1.9
Total formal votes		43,160	95.8	+0.0
Informal votes		1,878	4.2	+0.0
Turnout		45,038	92.3	
Two-party-preferred result
Labor	Linda Burney	29,046	77.1	−0.3
Liberal	Philip Mansour	8,609	22.9	+0.3
Labor hold		Swing	−0.3	

==== 2003 ====
2003 New South Wales state election: Canterbury
Party	Candidate	Votes	%	±%
Labor	Linda Burney	21,699	56.0	−0.5
Liberal	Jack Kouzi	6,225	16.1	−0.8
Greens	Dominic Fitzsimmons	4,048	10.4	+6.2
Independent	John Koutsouras	3,470	8.9	+3.9
Unity	Ken Nam	2,322	6.0	+1.3
Save Our Suburbs	Peter Siapos	1,014	2.6	+2.6
Total formal votes		38,778	95.7	+0.0
Informal votes		1,754	4.3	−0.0
Turnout		40,532	91.1	
Two-party-preferred result
Labor	Linda Burney	25,643	77.6	+2.4
Liberal	Jack Kouzi	7,413	22.4	−2.4
Labor hold		Swing	+2.4	

=== Elections in the 1990s ===
==== 1999 ====
1999 New South Wales state election: Canterbury
Party	Candidate	Votes	%	±%
Labor	Kevin Moss	22,302	56.5	+1.5
Liberal	Natalie Baini	6,686	16.9	−17.3
Independent	John Koutsouras	1,973	5.0	+5.0
Unity	Guang-Hua Wan	1,870	4.7	+4.7
Greens	William Smith	1,662	4.2	+3.4
Democrats	Garry Dalrymple	1,137	2.9	−0.5
Christian Democrats	Michael Robinson	1,122	2.8	+2.7
One Nation	Khiloud Shakir	1,114	2.8	+2.8
Independent	Joshua Nam	715	1.8	+1.8
Independent	Phillip Tsavellas	691	1.8	+1.8
AAFI	Gerard Vanderwel	184	0.5	+0.5
Total formal votes		39,456	95.7	+5.1
Informal votes		1,783	4.3	−5.1
Turnout		41,239	92.2	
Two-party-preferred result
Labor	Kevin Moss	25,871	75.2	+13.5
Liberal	Natalie Baini	8,542	24.8	−13.5
Labor hold		Swing	+13.5	

==== 1995 ====
1995 New South Wales state election: Canterbury
Party	Candidate	Votes	%	±%
Labor	Kevin Moss	18,792	56.5	+3.9
Liberal	Paul Terrett	11,527	34.6	−5.9
Independent	Shane Nicholls	1,077	3.2	+3.2
Democrats	Garry Dalrymple	1,014	3.0	−3.8
Transport Action Group	John Warrington	864	2.6	+2.6
Total formal votes		33,274	89.8	+5.1
Informal votes		3,793	10.2	−5.1
Turnout		37,067	95.9	
Two-party-preferred result
Labor	Kevin Moss	19,905	61.7	+4.9
Liberal	Paul Terrett	12,364	38.3	−4.9
Labor hold		Swing	+4.9	

==== 1991 ====
1991 New South Wales state election: Canterbury
Party	Candidate	Votes	%	±%
Labor	Kevin Moss	15,756	52.6	+3.1
Liberal	Carlo Favorito	12,154	40.5	+5.1
Democrats	Garry Dalrymple	2,066	6.9	+6.9
Total formal votes		29,976	84.7	−10.6
Informal votes		5,411	15.3	+10.6
Turnout		35,387	93.4	
Two-party-preferred result
Labor	Kevin Moss	16,715	56.8	+1.0
Liberal	Carlo Favorito	12,699	43.2	−1.0
Labor hold		Swing	+1.0	

=== Elections in the 1980s ===
==== 1988 ====
1988 New South Wales state election: Canterbury
Party	Candidate	Votes	%	±%
Labor	Kevin Moss	13,692	47.7	−20.6
Independent EFF	Victoria Paradakis	7,194	25.0	+25.0
Liberal	Paul Ritchie	6,911	24.1	−7.5
Socialist	Dorothy Costa	923	3.2	+3.2
Total formal votes		28,720	95.3	−0.6
Informal votes		1,417	4.7	+0.6
Turnout		30,137	92.9	
Two-candidate-preferred result
Labor	Kevin Moss	14,527	53.4	−14.9
Independent EFF	Victoria Paradakis	12,678	46.6	+46.6
Labor hold		Swing	−14.9	

==== 1986 by-election ====
1986 Canterbury by-election Saturday 1 February
Party	Candidate	Votes	%	±%
Labor	Kevin Moss	12,189	53.14	
Liberal	George Elias	8,267	36.04	
Democrats	Paul Terrett	1,822	7.94	
National Action	Jim Saleam	513	2.24	
Rainbow Party	Julien Droulers	145	0.43	
Total formal votes		22,936	95.58	
Informal votes		1,061	4.42	
Turnout		23,997	74.56	
Labor hold		Swing		

Labor MP Kevin Stewart resigned to accept the post of Agent-General for NSW in London.

==== 1984 ====
1984 New South Wales state election: Canterbury
Party	Candidate	Votes	%	±%
Labor	Kevin Stewart	19,253	67.9	−10.7
Liberal	Robert Sharp	9,087	32.1	+10.7
Total formal votes		28,340	95.9	+0.9
Informal votes		1,214	4.1	−0.9
Turnout		29,554	92.1	+1.7
Labor hold		Swing	−10.7	

==== 1981 ====
1981 New South Wales state election: Canterbury
Party	Candidate	Votes	%	±%
Labor	Kevin Stewart	21,681	78.6	+4.6
Liberal	Colin Thew	5,917	21.4	−4.6
Total formal votes		27,598	95.0	
Informal votes		1,454	5.0	
Turnout		29,052	90.4	
Labor hold		Swing	+4.6	

=== Elections in the 1970s ===
==== 1978 ====
1978 New South Wales state election: Canterbury
Party	Candidate	Votes	%	±%
Labor	Kevin Stewart	22,519	76.0	+11.7
Liberal	Marjorie Pennington	7,104	24.0	−11.7
Total formal votes		29,623	95.8	−1.0
Informal votes		1,290	4.2	+1.0
Turnout		30,913	92.2	−0.4
Labor hold		Swing	+11.7	

==== 1976 ====
1976 New South Wales state election: Canterbury
Party	Candidate	Votes	%	±%
Labor	Kevin Stewart	19,581	64.3	+5.5
Liberal	Marjorie Pennington	10,889	35.7	−0.4
Total formal votes		30,470	96.8	+0.4
Informal votes		990	3.2	−0.4
Turnout		31,460	92.6	+1.6
Labor hold		Swing	+4.4	

==== 1973 ====
1973 New South Wales state election: Canterbury
Party	Candidate	Votes	%	±%
Labor	Kevin Stewart	16,784	58.8	−3.7
Liberal	Jack Backer	10,296	36.1	−1.4
Democratic Labor	John George	1,448	5.1	+5.1
Total formal votes		28,528	96.4	
Informal votes		1,071	3.6	
Turnout		29,599	91.0	
Two-party-preferred result
Labor	Kevin Stewart	17,078	59.9	−2.6
Liberal	Jack Backer	11,450	40.1	+2.6
Labor hold		Swing	−2.6	

==== 1971 ====
1971 New South Wales state election: Canterbury
Party	Candidate	Votes	%	±%
Labor	Kevin Stewart	15,711	62.5	+7.3
Liberal	Jack Backer	9,431	37.5	−2.6
Total formal votes		25,142	96.3	
Informal votes		970	3.7	
Turnout		26,112	93.3	
Labor hold		Swing	+4.0	

=== Elections in the 1960s ===
==== 1968 ====
1968 New South Wales state election: Canterbury
Party	Candidate	Votes	%	±%
Labor	Kevin Stewart	14,272	55.2	−1.9
Liberal	Stanley Squire	10,371	40.1	−2.8
Communist	Jack Mundey	1,226	4.7	+4.7
Total formal votes		25,869	96.7	
Informal votes		891	3.3	
Turnout		26,760	93.9	
Two-party-preferred result
Labor	Kevin Stewart	15,130	58.5	+1.4
Liberal	Stanley Squire	10,739	41.5	−1.4
Labor hold		Swing	+1.4	

==== 1965 ====
1965 New South Wales state election: Canterbury
Party	Candidate	Votes	%	±%
Labor	Kevin Stewart	13,355	57.1	−3.0
Liberal	Colin McPhee	10,045	42.9	+3.0
Total formal votes		23,400	97.9	−0.5
Informal votes		500	2.1	+0.5
Turnout		23,900	93.3	−0.7
Labor hold		Swing	−3.0	

==== 1962 ====
1962 New South Wales state election: Canterbury
Party	Candidate	Votes	%	±%
Labor	Kevin Stewart	14,469	60.1	+1.5
Liberal	Donald Arthur	9,589	39.9	−1.5
Total formal votes		24,058	98.4	
Informal votes		399	1.6	
Turnout		24,457	94.0	
Labor hold		Swing	+1.5	

=== Elections in the 1950s ===
==== 1959 ====
1959 New South Wales state election: Canterbury
Party	Candidate	Votes	%	±%
Labor	Arthur Tonge	13,353	58.6	
Liberal	William Dowd	9,417	41.4	
Total formal votes		22,770	98.6	
Informal votes		321	1.4	
Turnout		23,091	94.5	
Labor hold		Swing		

==== 1956 ====
1956 New South Wales state election: Canterbury
Party	Candidate	Votes	%	±%
Labor	Arthur Tonge	12,032	59.4	−7.1
Liberal	Cecil Ford	8,241	40.6	+11.5
Total formal votes		20,273	98.7	+0.6
Informal votes		275	1.3	−0.6
Turnout		20,548	94.0	0.0
Labor hold		Swing	−10.7	

==== 1953 ====
1953 New South Wales state election: Canterbury
Party	Candidate	Votes	%	±%
Labor	Arthur Tonge	14,025	66.5	
Liberal	Donald Arthur	6,146	29.1	
Communist	Roy Boyd	912	4.3	
Total formal votes		21,083	98.1	
Informal votes		418	1.9	
Turnout		21,501	94.0	
Two-party-preferred result
Labor	Arthur Tonge	14,758	70.0	
Liberal	Donald Arthur	6,325	30.0	
Labor hold		Swing		

==== 1950 ====
1950 New South Wales state election: Canterbury
Party	Candidate	Votes	%	±%
Labor	Arthur Tonge	11,448	58.8	
Liberal	Robert Bruce	8,022	41.2	
Total formal votes		19,470	98.8	
Informal votes		235	1.2	
Turnout		19,705	94.4	
Labor hold		Swing		

=== Elections in the 1940s ===
==== 1947 ====
1947 New South Wales state election: Canterbury
Party	Candidate	Votes	%	±%
Labor	Arthur Tonge	13,606	55.5	−16.6
Liberal	John Paget	10,931	44.5	+44.5
Total formal votes		24,537	98.9	+6.8
Informal votes		266	1.1	−6.8
Turnout		24,803	96.2	+2.2
Labor hold		Swing	N/A	

==== 1944 ====
1944 New South Wales state election: Canterbury
Party	Candidate	Votes	%	±%
Labor	Arthur Tonge	14,932	72.1	−5.9
Lang Labor	Claude Allen	5,769	27.9	+27.9
Total formal votes		20,701	92.9	−1.3
Informal votes		1,764	7.9	+1.3
Turnout		22,465	94.0	−0.8
Labor hold		Swing	N/A	

==== 1941 ====
1941 New South Wales state election: Canterbury
Party	Candidate	Votes	%	±%
Labor	Arthur Tonge	15,782	78.0	
New Social Order	William Brandon	2,804	13.9	
State Labor	William Hortin	1,639	8.1	
Total formal votes		20,225	94.2	
Informal votes		1,234	5.8	
Turnout		21,459	94.8	
Labor hold		Swing		

- Preferences were not distributed.

=== Elections in the 1930s ===
==== 1938 ====
1938 New South Wales state election: Canterbury
Party	Candidate	Votes	%	±%
Labor	Arthur Tonge	10,690	54.3	+3.7
United Australia	Edward Hocking	8,991	45.7	0.0
Total formal votes		19,681	98.7	+0.3
Informal votes		266	1.3	−0.3
Turnout		19,947	97.1	−0.5
Labor hold		Swing	N/A	

==== 1935 ====
1935 New South Wales state election: Canterbury
Party	Candidate	Votes	%	±%
Labor (NSW)	Arthur Tonge	9,355	50.6	+4.0
United Australia	Edward Hocking	8,462	45.7	+0.2
Federal Labor	Albert Gardiner	689	3.7	−3.8
Total formal votes		18,506	98.4	+0.1
Informal votes		291	1.6	−0.1
Turnout		18,797	97.6	+1.4
Labor (NSW) gain from United Australia		Swing	N/A	

- Preferences were not distributed.

==== 1932 ====
1932 New South Wales state election: Canterbury
Party	Candidate	Votes	%	±%
Labor (NSW)	Arthur Tonge	8,458	46.6	−21.8
United Australia	Edward Hocking	8,256	45.5	+15.6
Federal Labor	George Bramston	1,353	7.5	+7.5
Communist	Robert Cram	80	0.4	+0.4
Total formal votes		18,147	98.3	−0.1
Informal votes		317	1.7	+0.1
Turnout		18,464	96.2	+2.2
Two-party-preferred result
United Australia	Edward Hocking	9,129	50.3	
Labor (NSW)	Arthur Tonge	9,018	49.7	
United Australia gain from Labor (NSW)		Swing	N/A	

==== 1930 ====
1930 New South Wales state election: Canterbury
Party	Candidate	Votes	%	±%
Labor	Arthur Tonge	11,827	68.4	
Nationalist	Arthur Gardiner	5,177	29.9	
Independent	Ioan Hill	288	1.7	
Total formal votes		17,292	98.4	
Informal votes		283	1.6	
Turnout		17,575	94.0	
Labor hold		Swing		

=== Elections in the 1920s ===
==== 1927 ====
This section is an excerpt from 1927 New South Wales state election § Canterbury

1927 New South Wales state election: Canterbury
Party	Candidate	Votes	%	±%
Labor	Arthur Tonge	7,983	53.9	
Nationalist	Arthur Long	6,841	46.1	
Total formal votes		14,824	99.0	
Informal votes		146	1.0	
Turnout		14,970	86.3	
Labor win		(new seat)		

==== 1920–1927 ====
District abolished

=== Elections in the 1910s ===
==== 1917 ====
This section is an excerpt from 1917 New South Wales state election § Canterbury

1917 New South Wales state election: Canterbury
Party	Candidate	Votes	%	±%
Labor	George Cann	8,272	89.0	+37.0
Independent	James Lee	1,020	11.0	+11.0
Total formal votes		9,292	98.9	+1.3
Informal votes		105	1.1	−1.3
Turnout		9,397	41.6	−30.2
Labor hold		Swing	+37.0	

==== 1914 by-election ====
1914 Canterbury by-election Saturday 10 October
Party	Candidate	Votes	%	±%
Labor	George Cann	2,050	82.83	
Independent	James Huston	425	17.17	
Total formal votes		2,475	100.00	
Informal votes		0	0.00	
Turnout		2,475	15.84 (Note: estimate based on an electoral roll of 15,623 at the 1913 election.)	
Labor hold		Swing		

Henry Peters (Labor) was made bankrupt.

==== 1913 ====
This section is an excerpt from 1913 New South Wales state election § Canterbury

1913 New South Wales state election: Canterbury
Party	Candidate	Votes	%	±%
Labor	Henry Peters	5,691	52.0	
Liberal Reform	John Draper	4,701	43.0	
National Progressive	Richard Messiter	439	4.0	
Independent Liberal	Ernest Dent	111	1.0	
Total formal votes		10,942	71.8	
Informal votes		268	2.4	
Turnout		11,210	71.8	
Labor gain from Liberal Reform				

==== 1910 ====
This section is an excerpt from 1910 New South Wales state election § Canterbury

1910 New South Wales state election: Canterbury
Party	Candidate	Votes	%	±%
Liberal Reform	Varney Parkes	5,824	55.7	+12.7
Labour	Ernest Burgess	4,6221	44.3	+16.8
Independent	John Gager	17	0.2	
Total formal votes		10,463	97.8	+0.7
Informal votes		236	2.2	−0.7
Turnout		10,699	71.5	−2.2
Member changed to Liberal Reform from Independent Liberal				

=== Elections in the 1900s ===
==== 1907 ====
This section is an excerpt from 1907 New South Wales state election § Canterbury

1907 New South Wales state election: Canterbury
Party	Candidate	Votes	%	±%
Independent Liberal	Varney Parkes	3,531	43.0	
Liberal Reform	Thomas Mackenzie	2,419	29.5	−27.4
Labour	Edgar Cutler	2,257	27.5	+2.8
Total formal votes		8,207	97.1	
Informal votes		246	2.9	
Turnout		8,453	73.7	
Independent Liberal gain from Liberal Reform				

==== 1904 ====
This section is an excerpt from 1904 New South Wales state election § Canterbury

1904 New South Wales state election: Canterbury
Party	Candidate	Votes	%	±%
Liberal Reform	Thomas Mackenzie	2,687	56.9	
Labour	Edgar Cutler	1,166	24.7	
Independent	Thomas Taylor	813	17.2	
Independent	Robert Smith	56	1.2	
Total formal votes		4,722	99.0	
Informal votes		48	1.0	
Turnout		4,770	56.8	
Liberal Reform hold				

Canterbury lost part of the district to Camden and Granville. It absorbed parts of Marrickville, Petersham and St George. Thomas Mackenzie (Liberal Reform) was the member for Canterbury. Each of the members for Marrickville. Petersham and St George successfully contested their district.

==== 1901 ====
This section is an excerpt from 1901 New South Wales state election § Canterbury

1901 New South Wales state election: Canterbury
Party	Candidate	Votes	%	±%
Liberal Reform	Thomas Mackenzie	1,048	47.9	−17.9
Independent	Thomas Taylor (defeated)	991	45.3	
Independent	Frederick Barker	56	2.6	
Independent	William Gilliver	53	2.4	
Independent	Hampton Slatyer	18	0.8	
Independent	Thomas Dalton	17	0.8	
Independent	Frederick Webster	3	0.14	
Total formal votes		2,186	98.5	−0.5
Informal votes		34	1.5	+0.5
Turnout		2,220	62.0	+7.6
Liberal Reform hold				

Varney Parkes (Free Trade) had won the seat at the 1898 election, however he resigned and Thomas Taylor (Independent) won the seat at the July 1900 by-election.

==== 1900 by-election 2 ====
1900 Canterbury colonial by-election Saturday 28 July
Party	Candidate	Votes	%	±%
Independent	Thomas Taylor	861	51.4	
Liberal Reform	Sydney Smith (Note: Party labels are difficult to define in 1900, with the Free Trade Party transforming into the Liberal Reform Party.)	814	48.6	
Total formal votes		1,675	98.9	
Informal votes		19	1.1	
Turnout		1,694	50.7 (Note: estimate based on an electoral roll of 3,340 at June 1900.)	
Independent gain from Liberal Reform				

The election of Sydney Smith at the June 1900 by-election was declared void.

==== 1900 by-election 1 ====
1900 Canterbury colonial by-election Saturday 9 June
Party	Candidate	Votes	%	±%
Free Trade	Sydney Smith (elected)	527	49.6	
Protectionist	Thomas Taylor	522	49.1	
Independent	Joseph Cooper	14	1.3	
Total formal votes		1,063	99.1	
Informal votes		10	0.9	
Turnout		1,073	32.1	
Free Trade hold				

Varney Parkes resigned.

=== Elections in the 1890s ===
==== 1898 ====
This section is an excerpt from 1898 New South Wales colonial election § Canterbury

1898 New South Wales colonial election: Canterbury
Party	Candidate	Votes	%	±%
Free Trade	Varney Parkes	1,083	65.8	
National Federal	Thomas Bavin	532	32.3	
Independent Federalist	George Rundle	30	1.8	
Total formal votes		1,645	99.0	
Informal votes		16	1.0	
Turnout		1,661	54.4	
Free Trade hold				

==== 1895 ====
This section is an excerpt from 1895 New South Wales colonial election § Canterbury

1895 New South Wales colonial election: Canterbury
Party	Candidate	Votes	%	±%
Free Trade	Varney Parkes	955	71.9	
Independent	Mark Hammond	373	28.1	
Total formal votes		1,328	99.6	
Informal votes		6	0.5	
Turnout		1,334	50.7	
Free Trade hold				

==== 1895 by-election ====
1895 Canterbury colonial by-election
Party	Candidate	Votes	%	±%
Free Trade	Varney Parkes	unopposed		
Registered electors		2,655 (Note: Estimate based on a roll of 2,655 at the 1894 election.)		
Free Trade hold				

==== 1894 ====
This section is an excerpt from 1894 New South Wales colonial election § Canterbury

1894 New South Wales colonial election: Canterbury
Party	Candidate	Votes	%	±%
Free Trade	Varney Parkes	1,059	50.2	
Ind. Free Trade	Thomas Taylor	644	30.5	
Labour	James McBean	267	12.7	
Protectionist	Thomas Wearne	140	6.6	
Total formal votes		2,110	98.4	
Informal votes		35	1.6	
Turnout		2,145	80.8	
Free Trade win		(previously 4 members)		

==== 1891 re-count ====
1891 Canterbury election re-count Wednesday 2 September
Party	Candidate	Votes	%	±%
Free Trade	Joseph Carruthers (re-elected 1)	N/A		
Labour	Thomas Bavister (elected 2)	4,453	12.19	+0.01
Labour	Cornelius Danahey (elected 3)	4,363	11.99	+0.03
Ind. Free Trade	James Eve (elected 4)	4,349	11.92	+0.02
Free Trade	John Wheeler (defeated)	4,344	11.90	−0.02
Total formal votes		36,491	99.30	−0.02
Informal votes		258 (Note: Calculated on the assumption that the total number of votes did not change.)	0.70	+0.02
Turnout		10,279	54.96	'"`UNIQ−−ref−000001C7−QINU`"'
Ind. Free Trade gain 1 from Free Trade				

The Elections and Qualifications Committee conducted a re-count of the 1891 Canterbury election and declared that John Wheeler (Free Trade) had not been elected the member for Canterbury. No by-election was conducted, instead the committee declared that James Eve (Ind. Free Trade) had been elected.

==== 1891 ====
This section is an excerpt from 1891 New South Wales colonial election § Canterbury

1891 New South Wales colonial election: Canterbury Wednesday 17 June
Party	Candidate	Votes	%	±%
Free Trade	Joseph Carruthers (re-elected 1)	7,231	19.81	
Labour	Thomas Bavister (elected 2)	4,449	12.19	
Labour	Cornelius Danahey (elected 3)	4,375	11.99	
Free Trade	John Wheeler (re-elected 4)	4,349	11.92	
Ind. Free Trade	James Eve	4,344	11.90	
Labour	John Grant	3,857	10.57	
Free Trade	Griffith Russell-Jones	3,690	10.11	
Free Trade	William Henson	2,787	7.64	
Protectionist	William Webster	1,417	3.88	
Total formal votes		36,499	99.32	
Informal votes		250	0.68	
Turnout		10,279	54.96	
Labour gain 2 from Free Trade				
Free Trade hold 2				

The Elections and Qualifications Committee conducted a re-count in September 1891 which overturned the election of John Wheeler and declared that James Eve had been elected.

=== Elections in the 1880s ===
==== 1889 ====
This section is an excerpt from 1889 New South Wales colonial election § Canterbury

1889 New South Wales colonial election: Canterbury Saturday 2 February
Party	Candidate	Votes	%	±%
Free Trade	Joseph Carruthers (elected 1)	6,066	20.6	
Free Trade	John Wheeler (elected 2)	5,658	19.2	
Free Trade	James Wilshire (elected 3)	5,576	18.9	
Free Trade	Alexander Hutchison (elected 4)	5,504	18.7	
Protectionist	John Watkin	2,320	7.9	
Protectionist	Wilfred Blacket	2,207	7.5	
Protectionist	Alexander Ralston	2,120	7.2	
Total formal votes		29,451	99.6	
Informal votes		122	0.4	
Turnout		8,435	51.1	
Free Trade hold 4				

==== 1887 ====
This section is an excerpt from 1887 New South Wales colonial election § Canterbury

1887 New South Wales colonial election: Canterbury Saturday 12 February
Party	Candidate	Votes	%	±%
Free Trade	Joseph Carruthers (elected 1)	4,302	19.8	
Free Trade	Alexander Hutchison (elected 2)	3,013	13.9	
Free Trade	William Henson (re-elected 3)	2,385	11.0	
Free Trade	William Davis (elected 4)	2,264	10.4	
Free Trade	James Wilshire	2,179	10.0	
Free Trade	William Cameron	2,101	9.7	
Free Trade	John Wheeler	2,028	9.3	
Protectionist	John Watkin	1,507	6.9	
Free Trade	Richard McCoy	1,477	6.8	
Free Trade	George Wallace	504	2.3	
Total formal votes		21,760	99.3	
Informal votes		160	0.7	
Turnout		6,776	53.6	

==== 1885 ====
This section is an excerpt from 1885 New South Wales colonial election § Canterbury

1885 New South Wales colonial election: Canterbury Friday 16 October
Candidate	Votes	%
Mark Hammond (re-elected 1)	2,760	16.1
William Henson (re-elected 2)	2,479	14.5
Septimus Stephen (re-elected 3)	2,432	14.2
William Judd (elected 4)	2,311	13.5
Alban Riley	2,178	12.7
Alexander Hutchison	1,955	11.4
Richard McCoy	1,911	11.2
Thomas Robertson	1,104	6.4
Total formal votes	17,130	99.3
Informal votes	125	0.7
Turnout	6,042	57.4
	(1 new seat)	

==== 1885 by-election ====
1885 Canterbury by-election Wednesday 16 September
Candidate	Votes	%
William Henson (elected)	1,733	68.1
Robert Hudson	888	33.9
Total formal votes	2,621	98.7
Informal votes	35	1.3
Turnout	2,656	25.3

Henry Moses was appointed to the Legislative Council.

==== 1884 by-election ====
1884 Canterbury by-election Saturday 19 April
Candidate	Votes	%
Mark Hammond (elected)	1,311	79.7
George Stevens	334	20.3
Total formal votes	1,645	98.1
Informal votes	31	1.9
Turnout	1,676	20.8

William Pigott resigned.

==== 1882 ====
This section is an excerpt from 1882 New South Wales colonial election § Canterbury

1882 New South Wales colonial election: Canterbury Saturday 9 December
Candidate	Votes	%
William Pigott (re-elected 1)	2,638	27.5
Septimus Stephen (elected 2)	1,933	20.1
Henry Moses (elected 3)	1,256	13.1
Mark Hammond	1,143	11.9
William Henson (defeated)	1,117	11.6
Joseph Mitchell	879	9.2
William Archer	633	6.6
Total formal votes	9,599	98.7
Informal votes	124	1.3
Turnout	3,921	58.2
	(1 new seat)	

Joseph Mitchell had previously been defeated as a sitting member for Newtown.

==== 1880 ====
This section is an excerpt from 1880 New South Wales colonial election § Canterbury

1880 New South Wales colonial election: Canterbury Monday 22 November
Candidate	Votes	%
William Pigott (elected 1)	2,513	42.1
William Henson (elected 2)	1,380	23.1
Alfred Allen	672	11.3
Thomas Courtney	622	10.4
George Pile	493	8.3
Myles McRae	232	3.9
Total formal votes	56	100.0
Informal votes	5,968	0.0
Turnout	5,993	55.5

One sitting member John Lucas did not contest the election. The other sitting member Sir Henry Parkes successfully contested East Sydney.

=== Elections in the 1870s ===
==== 1878 by-election ====
1878 Canterbury by-election Tuesday 31 December
Candidate	Votes	%
Sir Henry Parkes (re-elected)	1,048	90.9
Aaron Wheeler	105	9.1
Total formal votes	1,153	100.0
Informal votes	0	0.0
Turnout	1,153	15.7

Sir Henry Parkes was appointed Colonial Secretary in the third Parkes ministry.

==== 1877 ====
This section is an excerpt from 1877 New South Wales colonial election § Canterbury

1877 New South Wales colonial election: Canterbury Monday 29 October
Candidate	Votes	%
Sir Henry Parkes (elected 1)	1,841	28.4
John Lucas (re-elected 2)	1,645	25.4
Richard Hill (defeated)	1,443	22.3
George Pile	969	14.9
William Henson	588	9.1
Total formal votes	6,486	100.0
Informal votes	0	0.0
Turnout	6,486	49.2

==== 1874–75 ====
This section is an excerpt from 1874-75 New South Wales colonial election § Canterbury

1874–75 New South Wales colonial election: Canterbury Monday 28 December 1874
Candidate	Votes	%
Richard Hill (re-elected 1)	1,791	35.9
John Lucas (re-elected 2)	1,689	33.9
William Pigott	1,429	28.7
Aaron Wheeler	77	1.5
Total formal votes	4,986	100.0
Informal votes	0	0.0
Turnout	3,393	62.3

==== 1872 ====
This section is an excerpt from 1872 New South Wales colonial election § Canterbury

1872 New South Wales colonial election: Canterbury Tuesday 20 February
Candidate	Votes	%
Richard Hill (re-elected 1)	1,715	38.7
John Lucas (re-elected 2)	1,442	32.5
Richard Wynne	1,147	25.9
William Henson	98	2.2
John Davis	30	0.7
Total formal votes	4,432	100.0
Informal votes	0	0.0
Turnout	2,806	54.7

==== 1871 by-election ====
1871 Canterbury by-election Friday 6 January
Candidate	Votes	%
John Lucas (elected)	1,388	62.2
William Henson	844	37.8
Total formal votes	2,232	100.0
Informal votes	0	0.00
Turnout	2,232	45.2

Montagu Stephen resigned.

=== Elections in the 1860s ===
==== 1869–70 ====
This section is an excerpt from 1869-70 New South Wales colonial election § Canterbury

1869–70 New South Wales colonial election: Canterbury Thursday 23 December 1869
Candidate	Votes	%
Montagu Stephen (elected 1)	1,252	26.3
Richard Hill (re-elected 2)	1,219	25.7
John Lucas (defeated)	979	20.6
William Hanson	947	19.9
Thomas Sullivan	339	7.1
W R Templeton	17	0.4
Total formal votes	4,753	100.0
Informal votes	0	0.0
Turnout	2,481	54.7

==== 1868 by-election ====
1868 Canterbury by-election Wednesday 16 September
Candidate	Votes	%
Richard Hill (elected)	unopposed	

James Pemell resigned.

==== 1865 by-election ====
1865 Canterbury by-election Friday 24 February
Candidate	Votes	%
James Pemell (elected)	1,104	70.2
John Waller	469	29.8
Total formal votes	1,573	100.0
Informal votes	0	0.0
Turnout	1,573	44.9

John Lucas resigned.

==== 1864–65 ====
This section is an excerpt from 1864–65 New South Wales colonial election § Canterbury

1864–65 New South Wales colonial election: Canterbury Wednesday 7 December 1864
Candidate	Votes	%
James Oatley (elected 1)	937	32.3
John Lucas (re-elected 2)	785	27.1
Edward Raper (defeated)	385	13.3
Samuel Lyons	374	12.9
William Roberts	324	11.2
William Forster	68	2.4
Tertius Rider	15	0.5
John Beer	10	0.4
Total formal votes	2,898	100.0
Informal votes	0	0.0
Turnout	1,792	51.1

==== 1860 ====
This section is an excerpt from 1860 New South Wales colonial election § Canterbury

1860 New South Wales colonial election: Canterbury Saturday 15 December
Candidate	Votes	%
John Lucas (re-elected 1)	884	43.9
Edward Raper (elected 2)	629	31.2
William Roberts (defeated)	384	19.1
Richard Cowan	119	5.9
Total formal votes	2,016	100.0
Informal votes	0	0.0
Turnout	1,244	40.0

William Roberts was the sitting member for Goulburn.

==== 1860 by-election ====
1860 Canterbury by-election Saturday 4 February
Candidate	Votes	%
John Lucas (elected)	713	70.7
William Sherwin	249	24.7
Maurice Reynolds	46	4.6
Total formal votes	1,008	100.0
Informal votes	0	0.0
Turnout	1,008	33.3

Edward Flood resigned.

=== Elections in the 1850s ===
==== 1859 ====
This section is an excerpt from 1859 New South Wales colonial election § Canterbury

1859 New South Wales colonial election: Canterbury Saturday 18 June
Candidate	Votes	%
Edward Flood (re-elected 1)	619	25.3
Samuel Lyons (elected 2)	538	22.0
John Lucas	497	20.3
Samuel Terry	352	14.4
William Windeyer	329	13.5
Maurice Reynolds	112	4.6
Total formal votes	2,447	100.0
Informal votes	0	0.0
Turnout	1,560	51.5
