= 1891 Canterbury colonial election re-count =

By-election in New South Wales, Australia

In September 1891 the Elections and Qualifications Committee conducted a re-count of the 1891 Canterbury election. There were 4 seats available. Joseph Carruthers (Free Trade) had been comfortably re-elected at the head of the poll with 7,231 votes, 19.8%. The following 4 candidates were separated by 105 votes, with John Wheeler (Free Trade) defeating James Eve (Ind. Free Trade) for the final seat with a margin of 5 votes. The next best candidate, John Grant (Labour) was a further 487 behind, with 3,857 votes, 10.6%.

The committee declared that John Wheeler (Free Trade) had not been elected the member for Canterbury, however no by-election was conducted. Instead the committee declared that James Eve (Ind. Free Trade) based on its own count of the result.

== Dates ==
Date	Event
17 June 1891	1891 Canterbury election
24 June 1891	Petition lodged by James Eve.
14 July 1891	John Wheeler sworn in as member for Canterbury
16 July 1891	Elections and Qualifications Committee appointed.
29 July 1864	Petition referred to the Elections and Qualifications Committee.
2 September 1891	Elections and Qualifications Committee declared that James Eve had been elected.

== Result ==
1891 Canterbury election re-count]] Wednesday 2 September
Party	Candidate	Votes	%	±%
Free Trade	Joseph Carruthers (re-elected 1)	N/A		
Labour	Thomas Bavister (elected 2)	4,453	12.19	+0.01
Labour	Cornelius Danahey (elected 3)	4,363	11.99	+0.03
Ind. Free Trade	James Eve (elected 4)	4,349	11.92	+0.02
Free Trade	John Wheeler (defeated)	4,344	11.90	−0.02
Total formal votes		36,491	99.30	−0.02
Informal votes		258 (Note: Calculated on the assumption that the total number of votes did not change.)	0.70	+0.02
Turnout		10,279	54.96	'"`UNIQ−−ref−0000000F−QINU`"'
Ind. Free Trade gain 1 from Free Trade				

== See also ==
- Electoral results for the district of Canterbury
- List of New South Wales state by-elections
