= 1986 Canterbury state by-election =

Election result for Canterbury, New South Wales, Australia

A by-election for the seat of Canterbury in the New South Wales Legislative Assembly was held on 1 February 1986. The by-election was triggered by the resignation of Labor MP Kevin Stewart to accept the post of Agent-General for NSW in London.

By-elections for the seats of Cabramatta and Kiama were held on the same day.

== Dates ==
Date	Event
31 December 1985	Kevin Stewart resigned.
3 January 1986	Writ of election issued by the Speaker of the Legislative Assembly and close of electoral rolls.
9 January 1986	Close of nominations
12 November 2016	Polling day, between the hours of 8 am and 6 pm
21 February 1986	Return of writ

== Results ==
1986 Canterbury by-election Saturday 1 February
Party	Candidate	Votes	%	±%
Labor	Kevin Moss	12,189	53.14	
Liberal	George Elias	8,267	36.04	
Democrats	Paul Terrett	1,822	7.94	
National Action	Jim Saleam	513	2.24	
Rainbow Party	Julien Droulers	145	0.43	
Total formal votes		22,936	95.58	
Informal votes		1,061	4.42	
Turnout		23,997	74.56	
Labor hold		Swing		

== See also ==
- Electoral results for the district of Canterbury
- List of New South Wales state by-elections
