= 1868 Canterbury colonial by-election =

By-election in New South Wales, Australia

A by-election for the seat of Canterbury in the New South Wales Legislative Assembly was held in September 1868 because of the resignation of James Pemell.

== Dates ==
Date	Event
2 September 1868	Writ of election issued by the Speaker of the Legislative Assembly and close of electoral rolls.
16 September 1868	Day of nomination
19 September 1868	Polling day
31 January 1871	Return of writ

== Results ==
1868 Canterbury by-election Wednesday 16 September
Candidate	Votes	%
Richard Hill (elected)	unopposed	

== See also ==
- Electoral results for the district of Canterbury
- List of New South Wales state by-elections
