= 1884 Canterbury colonial by-election =

By-election in New South Wales, Australia

A by-election for the seat of Canterbury in the New South Wales Legislative Assembly was held on 19 April 1884 because of the resignation of William Pigott due to ill health.

== Dates ==
Date	Event
8 April 1884	William Pigott resigned.
9 April 1884	Writ of election issued by the Speaker of the Legislative Assembly and close of electoral rolls.
17 April 1884	Day of nomination
19 April 1884	Polling day
22 April 1884	Return of writ

== Results ==
1884 Canterbury by-election Saturday 19 April
Candidate	Votes	%
Mark Hammond (elected)	1,311	79.7
George Stevens	334	20.3
Total formal votes	1,645	98.1
Informal votes	31	1.9
Turnout	1,676	20.8

== See also ==
- Electoral results for the district of Canterbury
- List of New South Wales state by-elections
