= 1865 Canterbury colonial by-election =

By-election in New South Wales, Australia

A by-election for the seat of Canterbury in the New South Wales Legislative Assembly was held on 24 February 1865 because of the resignation of John Lucas, who had been elected to both Canterbury, and Hartley.

== Dates ==
Date	Event
15 February 1865	Writ of election issued by the Speaker of the Legislative Assembly and close of electoral rolls.
21 February 1865	Day of nomination
24 February 1865	Polling day
28 February 1865	Return of writ

== Results ==
1865 Canterbury by-election Friday 24 February
Candidate	Votes	%
James Pemell (elected)	1,104	70.2
John Waller	469	29.8
Total formal votes	1,573	100.0
Informal votes	0	0.0
Turnout	1,573	44.9

== See also ==
- Electoral results for the district of Canterbury
- List of New South Wales state by-elections
