= 1871 Canterbury colonial by-election =

By-election in New South Wales, Australia

A by-election for the seat of Canterbury in the New South Wales Legislative Assembly was held on 6 January 1871 because of the resignation of Montagu Stephen due to ill health.

== Dates ==
Date	Event
14 December 1870	Writ of election issued by the Speaker of the Legislative Assembly and close of electoral rolls.
2 January 1871	Nominations at Ashfield
6 January 1871	Polling day
31 January 1871	Return of writ

== Results ==
1871 Canterbury by-election Friday 6 January
Candidate	Votes	%
John Lucas (elected)	1,388	62.2
William Henson	844	37.8
Total formal votes	2,232	100.0
Informal votes	0	0.00
Turnout	2,232	45.2

== See also ==
- Electoral results for the district of Canterbury
- List of New South Wales state by-elections
