= 1900 Canterbury colonial by-election =

1900 Canterbury colonial by-election may refer to

- 1900 Canterbury colonial by-election 1 held on 9 June 1900
- 1900 Canterbury colonial by-election 2 held on 28 July 1900

== See also ==
- List of New South Wales state by-elections
