= James Wilshire =

James Wilshire may refer to:

- James Robert Wilshire (1809–1860), Australian politician
- James Thompson Wilshire (1837–1909), Australian politician, son of the above
