= 1885 Canterbury colonial by-election =

By-election in New South Wales, Australia

A by-election for the seat of Canterbury in the New South Wales Legislative Assembly was held on 16 September 1885 because Henry Moses was appointed to the Legislative Council.

== Dates ==
Date	Event
2 September 1885	Writ of election issued by the Speaker of the Legislative Assembly and close of electoral rolls.
12 September 1885	Day of nomination
16 September 1885	Polling day
22 September 1885	Return of writ

== Results ==
1885 Canterbury by-election Wednesday 16 September
Candidate	Votes	%
William Henson (elected)	1,733	68.1
Robert Hudson	888	33.9
Total formal votes	2,621	98.7
Informal votes	35	1.3
Turnout	2,656	25.3

== See also ==
- Electoral results for the district of Canterbury
- List of New South Wales state by-elections
