= 1895 Canterbury colonial by-election =

- 11 June 1895

Electoral district of Canterbury in the New South Wales Legislative Assembly
- Registered: 2,655 (Note: Estimate based on a roll of 2,655 at the 1894 election.)
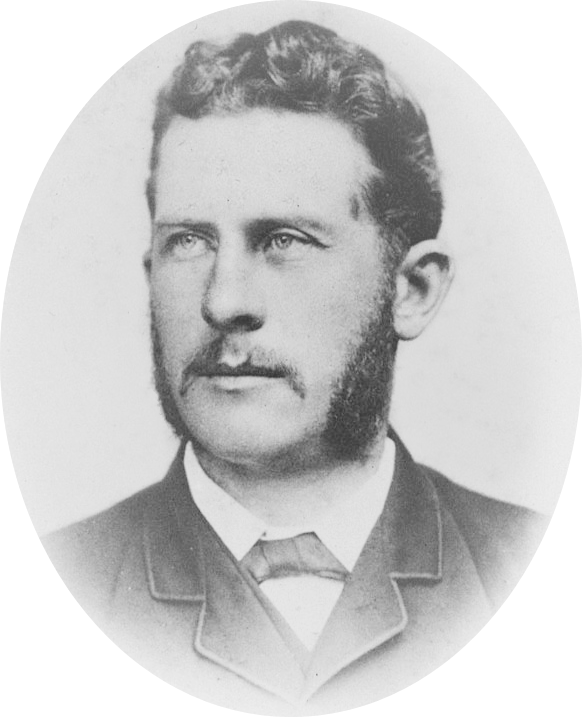
	First party
Candidate	Varney Parkes
Party	Free Trade
Popular vote	Unopposed
MP before election
Varney Parkes
Free Trade
Elected MP
Varney Parkes
Free Trade

The 1895 Canterbury colonial by-election was held on 11 June 1895 to elect the member for Canterbury in the New South Wales Legislative Assembly, following the resignation of Free Trade Party MP Varney Parkes.

Under the Constitution of New South Wales, if a sitting member "becomes bankrupt or takes the benefit of any law for the relief of bankrupt or insolvent debtors" they are disqualified from sitting in parliament. Parkes became bankrupt because of business failings and mortgage foreclosures, having owed a large sum of money to the Bank of New South Wales (most of it as guarantee for his father, Sir Henry Parkes).

Parkes was the only candidate to contest, and he was declared elected at the close of candidate nominations. He was again re-elected one month later at the New South Wales colonial election on 24 July 1895.

== Key events ==
- 3 June 1895 − Varney Parkes resigns
- 4 June 1895 − Writ of election issued by the Speaker of the Legislative Assembly
- 5 June 1895 − Varney Parkes declared bankrupt
- 11 June 1895 − Candidate nominations
- 14 June 1895 − Polling day (no poll held)
- 21 June 1895 − Return of writ (scheduled date)

== Results ==
1895 Canterbury colonial by-election
Party	Candidate	Votes	%	±%
Free Trade	Varney Parkes	unopposed		
Registered electors		2,655		
Free Trade hold				

== See also ==
- Electoral results for the district of Canterbury
- List of New South Wales state by-elections
