= Alexander Hutchison (1838–1917) =

Australian politician

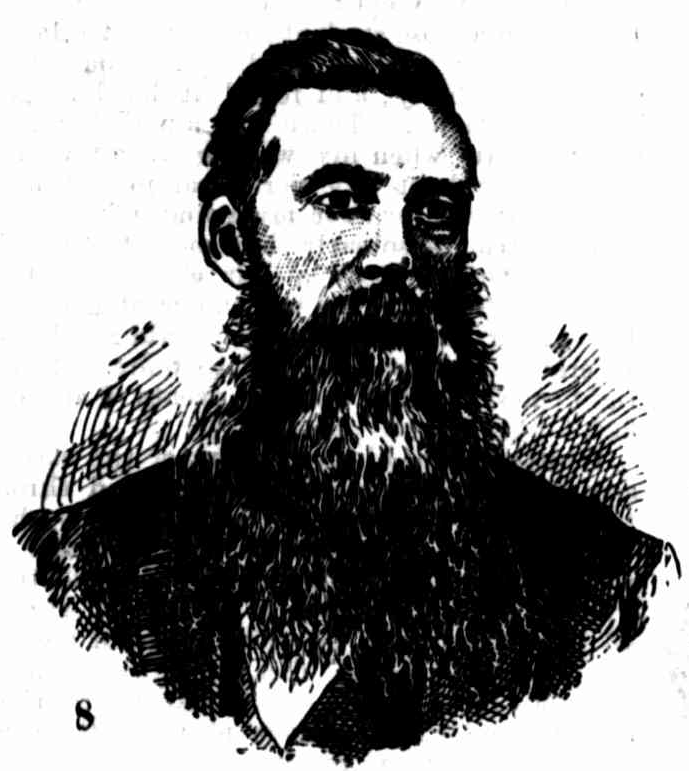

Alexander Hutchison (1838 – 1 August 1917) was a Scottish-born Australian politician.

He was born at Kilmarnock in Ayrshire. He was educated at Galston and in 1859 went to Glasgow to work for a publishing firm, before moving to Bristol in 1864 to start his own business. On 23 January 1857 he married Martha Bryce, with whom he had three children. He migrated to New South Wales in 1876, establishing a publishing firm at Maitland, which eventually had branches in Sydney, Newcastle, Tamworth and Tinonee. In 1887 he was elected to the New South Wales Legislative Assembly as a Free Trade member for Canterbury, serving until 1891.

Hutchison died at Arcadia in 1917.

New South Wales Legislative Assembly
Preceded by Mark Hammond; William Judd; Septimus Stephen; William Henson	Member for Canterbury; 1887 – 1891; With: Joseph Carruthers; William Davis / James Wilshire; William Henson / John Wheeler	Succeeded by Joseph Carruthers; Thomas Bavister; Cornelius Danahey; James Eve
