= James Oatley (New South Wales politician) =

New South Wales politician

James Oatley (16 April 1817 – 31 December 1878) was an Australian politician.

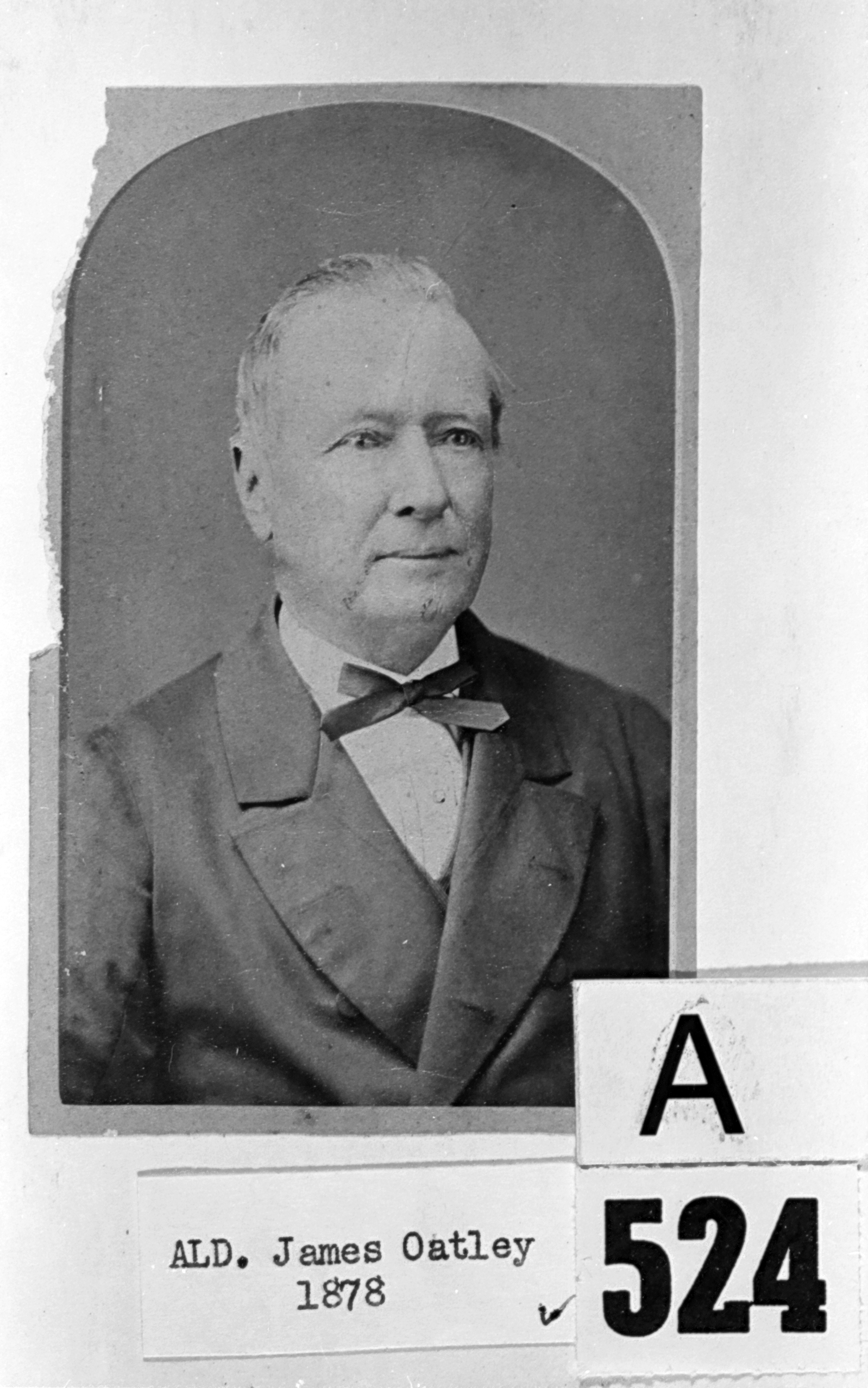
Alderman James Oatley 1857-67, 1868-78 Mayor 1862 A-00041473

== Early life ==
He was born in Sydney, the second son of Staffordshire watchmaker and ex-convict James Oatley and his wife Mary. His father had arrived in Sydney with a life sentence on the Marquis of Wellington in January 1815. His mother and newborn older brother arrived free on the Northampton in June 1815.

On 1 January 1839 he married Eleanor Johnson at Sydney and they later had nine children. He was apprenticed to John Urquhart, a coachbuilder of George Street. After his father's death in 1839, Oatley inherited substantial property including a Cooks River grant his father received in 1833, the location of the family estate, Snugborough Park. From 1844 he was the licensee of the Sportsman Hotel on the corner of Pitt and Goulburn streets. He retired in 1852 to devote himself to public affairs. He was a horse owner and a subscriber to the Homebush races.

Oatley was commissioned as a Justice of the Peace. He was appointed to the Cooks River Road Trust in 1849, and was a member of the Australian Patriotic Association, and Officer of the Independent Order of Odd Fellows.

== Mayor and parliamentarian ==
He was elected as a Councillor for the City of Sydney as alderman for Phillip Ward from 1 November 1852 until 31 December 1853 when the council was replaced by City Commissioners. He was re-elected unopposed for Phillip Ward, 11 April 1857 to 1 December 1867, and for Fitzroy Ward, 1 December 1868 to 1 December 1878. Oatley became a magistrate in 1859 and was elected Mayor in 1862. In 1864 he was elected to the New South Wales Legislative Assembly for Canterbury, serving until his retirement in 1869.

Following the death of his first wife Eleanor, Oatley married Margaret Curtis on 29 September 1870 at St Peter's church, Cooks River, and they had one daughter. He was an alderman on Paddington Council and mayor in 1876 and 1877. He was a Royal Commissioner on the Inquiry into Berrima Gaol in 1878.

Oatley died at his Bourke Street home in Woolloomooloo on 31 December 1878 (aged 61) and was buried at Camperdown Cemetery.

New South Wales Legislative Assembly
Preceded by John Lucas; Edward Raper	Member for Canterbury; 1864–1869; With: John Lucas / James Pemell / Richard Hill	Succeeded by Richard Hill; Montagu Stephen
Civic offices
Preceded by John Sutherland	Mayor of Sydney; 1862	Succeeded by Thomas Spence
Preceded by John Reddy	Mayor of Paddington; 1876–1878	Succeeded by Charles Campbell
