= June 1900 Canterbury colonial by-election =

Election result for Canterbury, New South Wales, Australia

A by-election for the seat of Canterbury in the New South Wales Legislative Assembly was held on 9 June 1900 because of the resignation of Varney Parkes.

== Dates ==
Date	Event
4 June 1900	Writ of election issued by the Speaker of the Legislative Assembly.
7 June 1900	Day of nomination
9 June 1900	Polling day
16 June 1900	Return of writ

== Results ==
1900 Canterbury colonial by-election Saturday 9 June
Party	Candidate	Votes	%	±%
Free Trade	Sydney Smith (elected)	527	49.6	
Protectionist	Thomas Taylor	522	49.1	
Independent	Joseph Cooper	14	1.3	
Total formal votes		1,063	99.1	
Informal votes		10	0.9	
Turnout		1,073	32.1	
Free Trade hold				

== Aftermath ==
While Sydney Smith was declared elected, the by-election was declared void by the Elections and Qualifications Committee because of irregularities in the way the returning officer dealt with unused ballot papers and that people had voted who did not have an elector's right at the time the writ was issued. Thomas Taylor won the subsequent by-election.

== See also ==
- Electoral results for the district of Canterbury
- List of New South Wales state by-elections
