= July 1900 Canterbury colonial by-election =

Election result for Canterbury, New South Wales, Australia

A by-election for the seat of Canterbury in the New South Wales Legislative Assembly was held on 28 July 1900 because the Elections and Qualifications Committee declared that the election of Sydney Smith, with a margin of 5 votes, at the by-election in June was void because of irregularities the way the returning officer dealt with unused ballot papers and that people had voted who did not have an elector's right at the time the writ was issued.

== Dates ==
| Date | Event |
|---|---|
| 9 June 1900 | Canterbury by-election. |
| 10 July 1900 | Thomas Taylor filed a petition against the election. |
| 16 July 1900 | Canterbury by-election declared void. |
| 18 July 1900 | Writ of election issued by the Speaker of the Legislative Assembly. |
| 25 July 1900 | Day of nomination |
| 28 July 1900 | Polling day |
| 7 August 1900 | Return of writ |

== Results ==
1900 Canterbury colonial by-election Saturday 28 July
| Party | Candidate | Votes | % | ±% |
|---|---|---|---|---|
| Independent | Thomas Taylor | 861 | 51.4 | |
| Liberal Reform | Sydney Smith (Note: Party labels are difficult to define in 1900, with the Free Trade Party transforming into the Liberal Reform Party.) | 814 | 48.6 | |
| Total formal votes | | 1,675 | 98.9 | |
| Informal votes | | 19 | 1.1 | |
| Turnout | | 1,694 | 50.7 (Note: estimate based on an electoral roll of 3,340 at June 1900.) | |
| Independent gain from Liberal Reform | | | | |

== See also ==
- Electoral results for the district of Canterbury
- List of New South Wales state by-elections
