= John Wheeler (Australian politician) =

Politician and accountant in New South Wales, Australia

John Wheeler (7 December 1853 – 18 April 1915) was an Australian politician who was a member of the New South Wales Legislative Assembly between 1889 and 1891.

He was born in Sydney to sawyer Aaron Wheeler and Elizabeth Hawkins. He began work in 1870 for a coal company in Newcastle, eventually becoming a general manager. On 7 August 1878 he married Hannah Clarke, with whom he had seven children. He served as an alderman at Petersham, and was mayor from 1886 to 1890.

At the 1887 election for Canterbury he was one of nine Free Trade candidates for the four seats of the district of Canterbury, but was unsuccessful. At the 1889 election there were only four Free Trade candidates, including Wheeler, and all four were elected. For the 1891 election Wheeler was again one of four candidates nominated by the party, while a fifth candidate, James Eve, had the support of the local branch. The election was close with only 105 votes separating Thomas Bavister elected 2nd and Eve in 5th place, five votes behind Wheeler. Eve lodged a petition against the election of Wheeler. The Elections and Qualifications Committee conducted a re-count which overturned the result and declared that Eve had been elected.

Wheeler did not return to state politics, but was again an alderman at Persham Council and was mayor from 1912 to 1914. He died at Strathfield in 1915.

Civic offices
Preceded by William Lovel Davis	Mayor of Petersham; 1886 – 1891	Succeeded by Llewellyn Jones
Preceded by Richard Barry	Mayor of Petersham; 1912 – 1914	Succeeded by Charles Crammond
New South Wales Legislative Assembly
Preceded by Joseph Carruthers; Alexander Hutchison; William Davis; William Henson	Member for Canterbury; 1889 – 1891; With: Joseph Carruthers; Alexander Hutchison / Thomas Bavister; James Wilshire / Cornelius Danahey	Succeeded by James Eve
