= James Thompson Wilshire =

Australian politician

James Thompson Wilshire (20 April 1837 – 28 April 1909) was an Australian politician.

He was born in Sydney to James Robert Wilshire and Elizabeth Thompson, a member of a prominent and well-connected colonial family. He was educated at Peter Steel's School in Pitt Street and Henry Brown's City Grammar School before studying at the University of Sydney. He was a clerk and land agent at Scone from 1862. In 1883 he returned to Sydney, being now wealthy enough to retire. He was an alderman and mayor of Burwood, and was involved with a number of societies, notably those connected with sanitary reform. In 1889 he was elected to the New South Wales Legislative Assembly as one of the four Free Trade members for Canterbury, but he did not contest the 1891 election. Wilshire moved from Burwood to Neutral Bay, New South Wales in around 1894 (as did his half-brother Henry Austin Wilshire), and lived there until his death in 1909, leaving to his widow a substantial portfolio of local properties. He had no children.

New South Wales Legislative Assembly
Preceded by William Davis; William Henson	Member for Canterbury; 1889–1891; With: Joseph Carruthers; Alexander Hutchison; John Wheeler	Succeeded by Thomas Bavister; Cornelius Danahey; James Eve
