= Mark Hammond (Australian politician) =

Australian politician (1844–1908)

Mark John Hammond (15 November 1844 – 4 February 1908) was an Australian politician.

Born in Sydney, he received a brief education at Newtown before following his father to the Braidwood gold diggings in 1852; the family moved to Sofala in 1853. He became a blacksmith and jockey and joined a Hill End mining company in 1868. On 14 July 1869 he married Mary Ann Fitzpatrick at Bathurst, with whom he had three children. He was an alderman of Ashfield Council from 1876 and served as mayor in 1882. In 1884 Hammond was elected to the New South Wales Legislative Assembly as the member for Canterbury, serving until 1887. From 1900 to 1903 he was a mining agent in Sydney and campaigned on behalf of municipal government. Hammond died at Manly in 1908.

New South Wales Legislative Assembly
| Preceded by William Pigott | Member for Canterbury; 1884–1887; Served alongside: Moses/Henson, Stephen, none/Judd | Succeeded by Joseph Carruthers; William Davis; Alexander Hutchison |
