= John Gough Waller =

Australian politician

John Gough Waller (1818 or 1819 - 1903) was an Australian politician.

He was one of Charles Cowper's 21 appointments to the New South Wales Legislative Council in May 1861, but did not take his seat. He stood as a candidate for Patrick's Plains at the 1864–65 election, and the 1865 Canterbury by-election, but was unsuccessful on both occasions.

Waller had married Anne Agar Hansard on 10 September 1842. He died on 11 July 1903 aged 84 years.
