= William Lovel Davis =

Politician and accountant in New South Wales, Australia

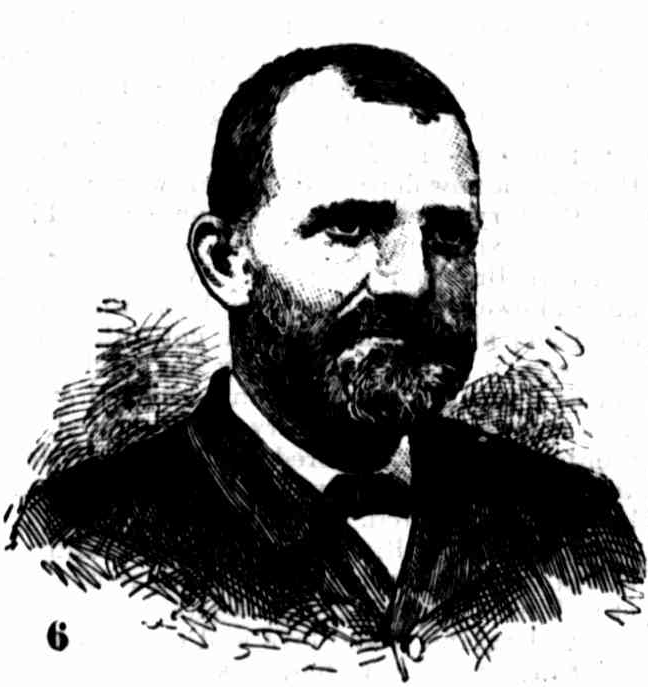

William Lovel Davis (24 September 1844 – 20 October 1932) was an English-born Australian politician.

He was born at Hallingley in Sussex to farmers James and Elizabeth Davis. He was educated at Hailsham, and in 1857 his parents moved to Herstmonceux, where he assisted them farming. He moved to Sydney in 1868, working as an accountant for a decade and then as a land agent. From 1883 he was an alderman at Petersham, serving as mayor from 1885 to 1886. He was a commissioner for New South Wales for the international exhibition in London in 1886.

He was elected to the New South Wales Legislative Assembly as a Free Trade member for Canterbury in 1887, but he did not run for re-election in 1889.

In 1902 he married Julia Warren; they had no children. Davis died at Lewisham in 1932 (aged 88).

Civic offices
Preceded by Henry Hughes	Mayor of Petersham; 1885 – 1886	Succeeded by John Wheeler
New South Wales Legislative Assembly
Preceded by Mark Hammond; William Judd; Septimus Stephen; William Henson	Member for Canterbury; 1887 – 1889; With: Joseph Carruthers; Alexander Hutchison; William Henson	Succeeded by James Wilshire; Joseph Carruthers; Alexander Hutchison; John Wheeler
