= Edward Raper =

Irish-born Australian politician

Edward Raper (1806 – 29 March 1882) was an Irish-born Australian politician.

He was born in Dublin and migrated to Australia around 1832. In 1834 he married Jane Feeney, with whom he had seven children. He worked as a butcher in Sydney, and in 1860 was elected to the New South Wales Legislative Assembly for Canterbury. He was defeated in 1864. Raper died at Darlinghurst in 1882.

New South Wales Legislative Assembly
Preceded by Edward Flood; Samuel Lyons	Member for Canterbury; 1860–1864; Served alongside: John Lucas	Succeeded by James Oatley
