= Cornelius Danahey =

Australian politician

Cornelius J. Danahey
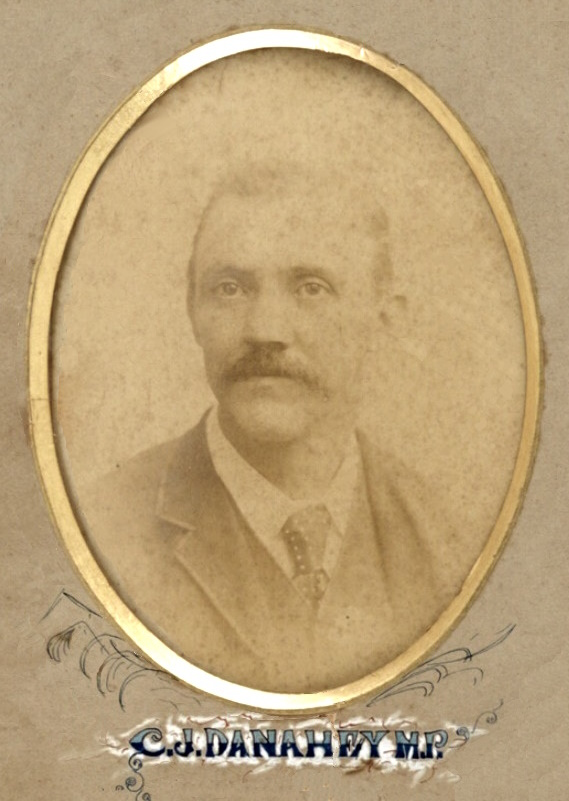

Member for Canterbury (NSW Legislative Assembly)
- In office 17 June 1891 – 25 June 1894

Personal details
- Born: 3 October 1856 Detroit, Michigan, United States of America
- Died: 15 November 1928 (aged 72) Wellington, New Zealand

Cornelius James Danahey (3 October 1856 – 15 November 1928) was an American-born Australian engineer and politician.

In June 1891 Danahey was amongst the initial group of Labor Party members elected to the New South Wales Legislative Assembly. He represented the electorate of Canterbury from 1891 to June 1894 as a member of the Labor Electoral League. From April 1900 to June 1901 Danahey served with the New South Wales Citizens' Bushmen in the British war against the Boer republics in southern Africa. He lived and worked for about a decade in the Northern Rivers region of New South Wales and from about 1916 he lived in New Zealand, in the Wellington region, where he died in 1928.

== Biography ==
=== Early years ===
Cornelius James Danahey was born on 3 October 1856 at Detroit, Michigan, in the United States of America, to Irish immigrant parents.

Danahey was educated at the Cass Union High School in Detroit. In about 1869 he began working as an apprentice, aged thirteen, in the engineering trade.

=== Australia ===
In about 1873, when he was aged seventeen, Danahey emigrated to Australia and eventually settled in Sydney. He found work as a travelling agricultural machinery expert and agent for Sydney-based businesses (including the plough-makers, J. and C. Howard). He attended agricultural exhibitions and was engaged in the erection, working and instruction relating to water-boring plants, particularly in the northern and north-western regions of the colony of New South Wales.

After twelve years working in his peripatetic occupation, Danahey "grew tired of continued change" and in about 1885 obtained employment in the government railway service, working as an engine-fitter in the locomotive department at the Eveleigh railway workshops at Redfern, an inner western suburb of Sydney.

In February 1890, together with H. Goodere, Frederick Strafford and others, Danahey assisted in the establishment of the Australasian Society of Engineers. Danahey was elected to the position of treasurer.

In 1890 Danahey formed a partnership with Herbert Carter, a boot manufacturer with premises at Yule Street in Dulwich Hill. The business traded as Carter and Co. In February 1891 Danahey contested the local government election to represent the West ward of the Marrickville Municipal Council, but was unsuccessful.

=== Political career ===
Danahey resigned from his job at the Everleigh workshops on 15 June 1891 and accepted one of three nominations of the Canterbury Labor Electoral League to contest the Canterbury electorate in the New South Wales Legislative Assembly. The 1891 general election in New South Wales, held in June and early July 1891, saw the first electoral successes of the Labor Party (then known as the Labor Electoral League of New South Wales). At that time the Canterbury electorate returned four members of parliament and a total of nine candidates were nominated to fill the available seats. At the election held on 17 June 1891 two Free Trade Party members and two Labor League members were elected. One of the sitting members, Joseph Carruthers of the Free Trade Party, topped the poll. Danahey's Labor League colleague, Thomas Bavister, was elected in second place, with Danahey close behind taking the third seat with 4,375 votes (12 percent).

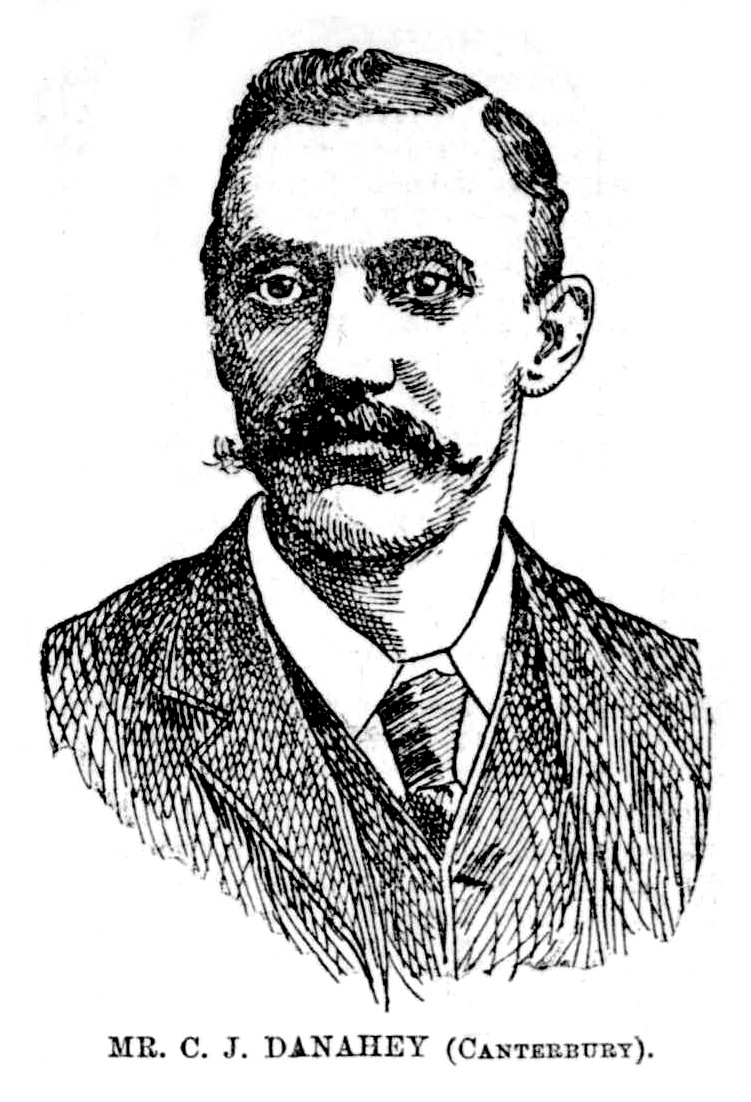
Illustration of Cornelius J. Danahey, published in Evening News newspaper, 7 July 1891.

In parliament Danahey was a supporter of the initial Labor caucus pledge, based on the trade union tradition of acceptance of decisions freely made at union meetings, whereby it was affirmed that decisions made at caucus meetings would be binding on all parliamentary members. In December 1891 the unity of the Labor party members was tested by a censure motion against the government by George Reid, leader of the Free Trade opposition. There was no unanimity of opinion amongst the Labor Party members on the fiscal issue of free trade versus protectionism, and the debate pitted the concept of party solidarity against members' personal beliefs and their constituents' interests. When the vote on Reid's censure motion was held, all the Labor League members, with the exception of James McGowen, "voted as their fiscal faith guided them", producing a split in the Labor vote. Danahey was one of the seventeen, all supporters of free trade except McGowen, who voted for the censure motion. Sixteen of the protectionist Labor members supported the government by voting against the motion, which was defeated. On 16 December 1891 two separate meetings were held in the wake of the split in the Labor party vote, one by the seventeen 'solidarity' members who considered themselves bona fide labour representatives and the other "by those members who are now regarded as deserters from the party".

In September 1893 the Electoral Districts Commissioners presented their scheme of redistribution of seats under the new Electoral Act before the New South Wales Legislative Assembly. As part of the process, multi-member electorates were abolished and the electorates were realigned and in some cases renamed. The Canterbury electorate was split into the single-member electorates of Canterbury, Ashfield, Burwood, Petersham and St. George.

In November 1893 Danahey was one of nine members of the Legislative Assembly who attended the Labor 'unity conference' in Sydney, organised by the central committee of the Labor Electoral League, intended to resolve internal conflicts and enforce party discipline. The conference chairman Chris Watson played a prominent role in reinforcing the requirement for Labor candidates to sign a pledge of solidarity committing them to vote as a unified caucus. Danahey was one of those who refused to sign the redrafted pledge, leading to a formal split with the 'solidarity' faction remaining as members of the official party.

At the 1894 general election Danahey was a candidate for the Petersham electorate, one of the single-member constituencies split from the Canterbury electorate. Danahey contested the election as a candidate of the Free Trade and Land Reform Association, opposed by seven other candidates, three of them representing the major parliamentary factions, the Free Trade Party, the Protectionist Party and the Labor Electoral League. At the election held on 14 July 1894 it was Llewellyn Jones, an independent free trade supporter and long-serving Petersham alderman, that topped the poll. Danahey polled fourth with 14.2 percent of the vote.

The Free Trade Party under the leadership of George Reid dominated the New South Wales Legislative Assembly after the July 1894 election. However, after the party's legislative reform agenda was subjected to obstruction by the Legislative Council, Reid went to a general election a year later in an effort to strengthen his mandate for reform. Danahey once again contested the seat for the Petersham electorate, standing as an independent free trade supporter. In a field of four candidates Jones was re-elected and Danahey polled third with 21.5 percent of the vote.

By the mid-1890s Danahey was living in Wardell Road, Marrickville. In November 1896 the partnership of Carter and Danahey, boot manufacturers trading as Carter and Co., was the subject of a sequestration order in the bankruptcy court. In late April 1897 Danahey's equity in the house and land at Yule Street in Dulwich Hill, the business premises of Carter and Co., was sold by auction as part of the bankruptcy settlement.

At the 1898 general election Danahey was one of three candidates to contest the Uralla-Walcha electorate, representing the free-trade Liberal Federal Association. Although he was living in Marrickville, Danahey claimed to know the Uralla-Walcha electorate well and expressed confidence in defeating the sitting member, William H. Piddington, who was described as "a renegade member of the Ministerial party, who has joined forces with the Conservatives". Danahey left Sydney on 11 July to campaign in the electorate. At the election held on 27 July 1898 Piddington was re-elected while Danahey attracted only 48 votes.

=== Boer war ===
By late 1899 the Australian colonies were beginning the process of raising military units to support Britain in its military counter-offensive against the Dutch Africkaner (Boer) republics in southern Africa. By January 1900 committees had been formed to select suitable men with riding and firearms skills amongst those that had volunteered for the South African war. The Citizens' Bushmen's Contingent, as it was named, was to be funded by public subscription with additional support from colonial governments. It was to be made up of about 1,100 men, with most of the selected volunteers coming from New South Wales and Victoria, with the other colonies also contributing men. By late January the selected men from New South Wales were gathered in camp at Randwick, in Sydney's eastern suburbs, where rifle practice and military drills were being carried out. On 24 January it was reported that Danahey, "formerly a labour representative", was amongst the volunteers at the Randwick camp, performing the duties of a tent orderly.^{[A]}

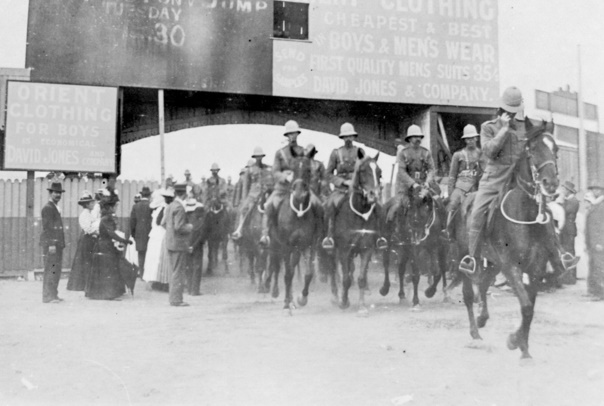
The New South Wales Citizens' Bushmen Contingent on parade in Sydney, prior to their departure for South Africa in February 1900.

While at the Randwick camp Danahey was tested for his horse-riding skills and marksmanship. He later claimed that certain members of the Citizens' Bushmen's Contingent committee were opposed to accepting his enlistment "because he had been a member of the original Labour party in Parliament" and suspected that he had volunteered to act as a newspaper correspondent not as a soldier. He was informed he had failed the shooting tests by a point, but he maintained that the military authorities "wished to retain him". Despite his apparent rejection by the committee, Danahey claimed he joined the contingent aboard the Atlantian prior to departure for South Africa at the request of the commanding officer, Colonel Henry Airey. Danahey's supposed initial lack of official approval led to him being described as a stowaway after his departure for South Africa aboard the Atlantian troopship.^{[B]}

The New South Wales Citizens' Bushmen left Sydney on 28 February 1900 on board the troop transport steamers Atlantian and Maplemore. The vessels docked at Cape Town on 31 March, but instead of proceeding to the frontline in the Cape Colony the Australian troops were ordered to Rhodesia via Beira in Portuguese East Africa. They travelled by sea to Biera and disembarked on 12 April. The troops were "put to work preparing camps for horses and mules", after which they performed the same task at Bamboo Creek and in Rhodesia at Umtali and Marandellas. Many of the men contracted fever at these places and nourishing food "could only be obtained at exorbitant prices". On 2 May Major-General Frederick Carrington informed the men on parade that they had been made "a permanent arm" of the Rhodesian Field Force, established to prevent Boer attacks on Rhodesia from the south. In about July 1900 the men were ordered to travel from the Rhodesian capital of Salisbury to Bulawayo, a distance of 280 miles (450 km). Although they were offered mules for transport, Colonel Airey ordered the men to walk the distance using their own horses to carry equipment, which was achieved with great hardship in thirteen days. They were stationed at Bulawayo for four weeks, after which they were transported in open railway trucks to Mafeking, near Transvaal's western border, arriving there several months after the siege had been lifted.

From Makeking the Citizens' Bushmen squadrons were utilised in various ways in attempting to protect British outposts and supply-lines within the Boer republic of Transvaal. British gains had begun to unravel during July as Generals Lemmer and De la Rey led a Boer resurgence in the western Transvaal. The Boer commando units adopted guerrilla tactics and conducted damaging raids against British-occupied positions and disrupted supply-lines. 'D' Squadron, of which Danahey was a member, took part in a heavy engagement at Koster River, near Rustenburg, on 22 July, in an attempt to relieve the Elands River garrison. Danahey's squadron was attached to Paget's Horse, a volunteer auxiliary battalion of the British Army raised by George Paget. During his service in South Africa Danahey was a correspondent for Sydney's Daily Telegraph newspaper, his articles being published anonymously. His duties during the war included being in charge of an ambulance waggon and later of an ammunition waggon.

Danahey returned from South Africa aboard the steamer Morayshire, which arrived at Sydney on 11 June 1901. The repatriated troops on board were from New South Wales and Queensland, mostly of the Citizens' Bushmen Contingent (by then referred to as the 1st Australian Bushmen).

=== Northern Rivers region ===
By December 1903 Danahey was living at Grafton, in the Northern Rivers region of New South Wales, where he was employed at the local railway workshops. That month he delivered an address at Grafton entitled 'Fourteen months with the Citizens' Bushmen in South Africa'. In a newspaper report the lecturer was described as "a lucid, clear and witty speaker". His lecture "depicted the varied phases of Boer life and warfare... profusely illustrated with lantern slides". By July 1905 Danahey was recorded as working as a consulting engineer at Grafton. In September 1909 Danahey advertised his business as a "practical land agent and auctioneer", located in Walker Street, Casino.

At the 1910 New South Wales general election Danahey was the Labor Party candidate for the Belubula electorate, in the Central West region of the state, standing against the sitting Liberal Reform Party member Thomas Waddell (previously a premier of New South Wales). At the election held on 14 October 1910 Waddell was returned, with Danahey receiving 43.4 percent of the vote.

Danahey lived for a period in Kyogle, 19 miles north of Casino. In regard to his residence there, he was described as "custodian of the School of Arts, press correspondent, and secretary of various bodies". While at Kyogle Danahey advocated for the construction of a tramway up the Eden Creek valley "to tap the vast timber resources of that district... but the proposal fizzled out".

In the 1911 edition of Wise's Post Office Directory, Danahey was listed as a "Practical Land Agent and Auctioneer" with an office in Walker Street, Casino. In November 1911 D. T. Byrnes took over the business of Crown Lands agent at Cowra "lately carried on by C. J. Danahey".

=== New Zealand ===
By about 1916 Danahey was living at Featherston in the Wellington region of New Zealand's North Island, where he has a business as a bookseller. By about 1918 Danahey was living in Wellington.

In 1919 Danahey was a candidate to represent the electorate of Wairarapa in the New Zealand House of Representatives. At the general election held on 16 December Danahey polled third, attracting only 184 votes.

In the early 1920s Danahey held the lease of the Wellington Opera House, where he presented silent motion pictures supported by orchestration.

=== Later years ===
Danahey was described as a "chess enthusiast" of the Wellington Working Men's Club.

Towards the end of his life Danahey was described as "penniless". In December 1927 Danahey approached the South African War Veterans' Association in New Zealand with a request that the organisation intercede on his behalf to request that he be granted an old age pension by either the Australian or New South Wales governments. The Association was in the process of negotiating with the Australian authorities when, on 14 November 1928, Danahey collapsed at the Wellington Working Men's Club. He was admitted to hospital, but died the following day, aged 72.

After his death it was discovered that Danahey was to be buried as a pauper. The secretary of the South African War Veterans' Association contacted the War Graves Division which resulted in a plot being set aside in the soldiers' section of Karori Cemetery for his "last resting place". The Association undertook to cover the funeral expenses and Danahey was buried on 19 November.

== Notes ==
A.The New South Wales Citizens' Bushmen consisted of four mounted rifle squadrons, each with 125 men. The unit underwent several name changes during the course of the war, later named the 1st Australian Bushmen Contingent and finally the 1st Bushmen Regiment.

B.Despite some uncertainty regarding Danahey's acceptance into the Citizens' Bushmen's Contingent, ten days before departure of the unit from Sydney he was listed amongst the names of the "men who have been attested for service with the Bushmen's Contingent in South Africa". He was listed amongst those in 'C' Squadron as "Cornelius James Danahey, Young". However, throughout Danahey's service in South Africa he was listed as a member of 'D' Squadron (of the New South Wales Citizens' Bushmen, later becoming known as the 1st Australian Bushmen).

New South Wales Legislative Assembly
Preceded by Alexander Hutchison; John Wheeler; James Wilshire	Member for Canterbury; 1891–1894; Served alongside: Thomas Bavister, Joseph Carruthers, James Eve	Succeeded by Varney Parkes
