= Kevin Moss =

Australian politician

Member of the New South Wales Parliament for Canterbury
- In office 1 February 1986 – 22 March 2003
- Preceded by: Kevin Stewart
- Succeeded by: Linda Burney

Kevin Joseph Moss (born 1 February 1946) is an Australian politician. He was a Labor Party member of the New South Wales Legislative Assembly from 1986 to 2003, representing the electorate of Canterbury.

Moss was born in Sydney, and was educated at St Pauls Convent School in Dulwich Hill and St Patrick's Church Hill. He was elected to the City of Canterbury council in 1973, and served as deputy mayor in 1976 and 1979 before being elected by his colleagues as mayor in 1980. He served as mayor until the year after his election to parliament, and was employed as a staffer at the party's head office during his period.

Moss won Labor preselection to contest the state seat of Canterbury in 1986 when the appointment of former Labor minister Kevin Stewart as the state's Agent-General in London created the need for a by-election. Canterbury was considered a safe seat for the Labor Party, and Moss was elected with over 53% of the primary vote. He was re-elected four times as the member for Canterbury, and served as a parliamentary secretary in the first two terms of the Carr government. Moss retired at the 2003 election, and was succeeded by Labor member Linda Burney.

Civic offices
Preceded by John Mountford	Mayor of Canterbury; 1980–1987	Succeeded by John Gorrie
New South Wales Legislative Assembly
Preceded by Kevin Stewart	Member for Canterbury; 1986–2003	Succeeded by Linda Burney
