= Richard Hill (New South Wales politician) =

Australian politician

Richard Hill (22 September 1810 – 19 August 1895) was an Australian politician.

He was born in Parramatta to William Hill and Mary Johnson, both emancipated convicts. He was a carpenter's apprentice and by the late 1820s was managing William Wentworth's Vaucluse estate. He later became a butcher and also owned an orchard at Lane Cove. In 1848 he acquired 76,000 acres on the Liverpool Plains. In 1868 he was elected to the New South Wales Legislative Assembly for Canterbury, where he remained until his defeat in 1877. In 1880 he was appointed to the New South Wales Legislative Council. On 27 January 1832 he married Henrietta Cox, the sister of W. C. Wentworth's wife; they had eleven children. A close supporter of Henry Parkes, he was a founding member of the Aborigines Protection Board in 1883. Hill died in Sydney in 1895.

== See also ==
Political families of Australia : Wentworth/Hill/Griffiths/Scott/Cooper family

New South Wales Legislative Assembly
Preceded by James Pemell	Member for Canterbury; 1868–1877; Served alongside: Oatley/Stephen/Lucas	Succeeded by Henry Parkes
