= Thomas Bavister =

Australian politician

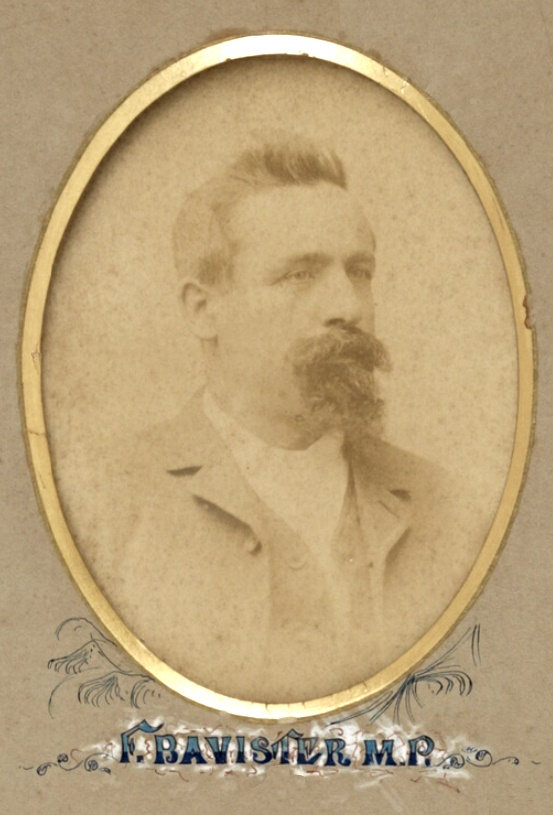

Member for Canterbury (NSW Legislative Assembly)
- In office 17 June 1891 – 25 June 1894

Member for Ashfield (NSW Legislative Assembly)
- In office 17 June 1894 – 5 June 1895

Member for Ashfield (NSW Legislative Assembly)
- In office 24 July 1895 – 8 July 1898

Personal details
- Born: 18 June 1850 Barnsley, Yorkshire
- Died: 2 January 1923 (aged 72) Kogarah, New South Wales
- Spouse: Harriet Green
- Parents: Joseph Bavister (father); Kesiah (née Langley) (mother)

Thomas Bavister (18 June 1850 – 2 January 1923) was an English-born Australian bricklayer, union official and politician.

Bavister was a qualified bricklayer from a working-class background and active in trade union affairs. He emigrated to Australia in 1883 and maintained his involvement in trade union organisations and working for workers' rights and conditions. In June 1891 Bavister was amongst the initial group of Labor Party members elected to the New South Wales Legislative Assembly. He represented the electorates of Canterbury and Ashfield from 1891 to July 1898, as a member of the Labor Electoral League in his first term, and later as a free trade supporter or independent Labor member after refusing to sign Labor's caucus solidarity pledge.

== Biography ==
=== Early years ===
Thomas Bavister was born on 18 June 1850 near Barnsley in Yorkshire (between the cities of Sheffield to the south and Wakefield to the north), the son of Joseph Bavister and Kesiah (née Langley). His father was a railway ganger. When Thomas was nine months of age his father was killed while he was inspecting the railway line.

After this tragedy the family joined a relative at Luton in Bedfordshire. Young Thomas was educated at Luton and nearby St. Albans in Hertfordshire.

When he was aged fourteen Thomas Bavister began to earn his own living as an errand boy. After two years he was apprenticed as a bricklayer.

=== Bricklayers' Trade Society ===
In 1871 Bavister went to Sheffield as a qualified tradesman, where he joined the United Operative Bricklayers' Trade Society of Great Britain and Ireland, an organisation of workers to maintain or improve the employment of its members. He became involved in the organisation and soon took a prominent role the working of the Society, which at the time had a membership of eleven thousand. For six years he served as secretary of the Sheffield branch of the United Operative Bricklayers' Trade Society. In February 1873 Bavister was elected as a member of the Society's executive council.

Thomas Bavister and Harriet Green were married on 3 September 1873 with Wesleyan Methodist rites at Luton, Bedfordshire.

In 1875 Bavister was a representative of the United Operative Bricklayers' Trade Society at the Trades Union Congress held at Glasgow. In 1876 he was one of the Society's representative at the conference and demonstration supporting Samuel Plimsoll in London. From 1877 to 1883 Bavister served as assistant-secretary to the general council of the Bricklayers' Trade Society.

=== Sydney ===
Thomas and Harriet Bavister emigrated to Australia, arriving at Sydney on 18 June 1883. Thomas began working at his trade and joined the United Operative Bricklayers' Society of New South Wales. After a period of six months, described as "a self-imposed probation", Bavister began working for the Society in which, and for which, he held responsible positions on a continuous basis. He served as secretary for three years and was a delegate to the eight-hour committee for three years.

In March 1886 Bavister was a delegate of the Bricklayers' Society at a meeting of the Federated Building Trades Council of New South Wales. By 1888 Bavister was serving as secretary of the Building Trades Council (a position he held at various times until at least 1897).

During the years 1889 and 1890 Bavister was the Bricklayers' union delegate on the Trades and Labor Council when preparations were being made to run Labor candidates at the next general election.

=== Political career ===
The 1891 general election in New South Wales, held in June and early July 1891, saw the first electoral successes of the Labor Party (then known as the Labor Electoral League of New South Wales). Thomas Bavister was selected as a Labor Electoral League candidate, to contest the electorate of Canterbury in the New South Wales Legislative Assembly, a jurisdiction at that time returning four members of parliament. A total of nine candidates were nominated for the four available seats. At the election held on 17 June 1891 two Free Trade Party members and two Labor League members were elected. One of the sitting members, Joseph Carruthers of the Free Trade Party, topped the poll, with Bavister in second place with 4,449 votes (12.2 percent). Bavister's Labor League colleague, Cornelius Danahey, was also elected (in third position).

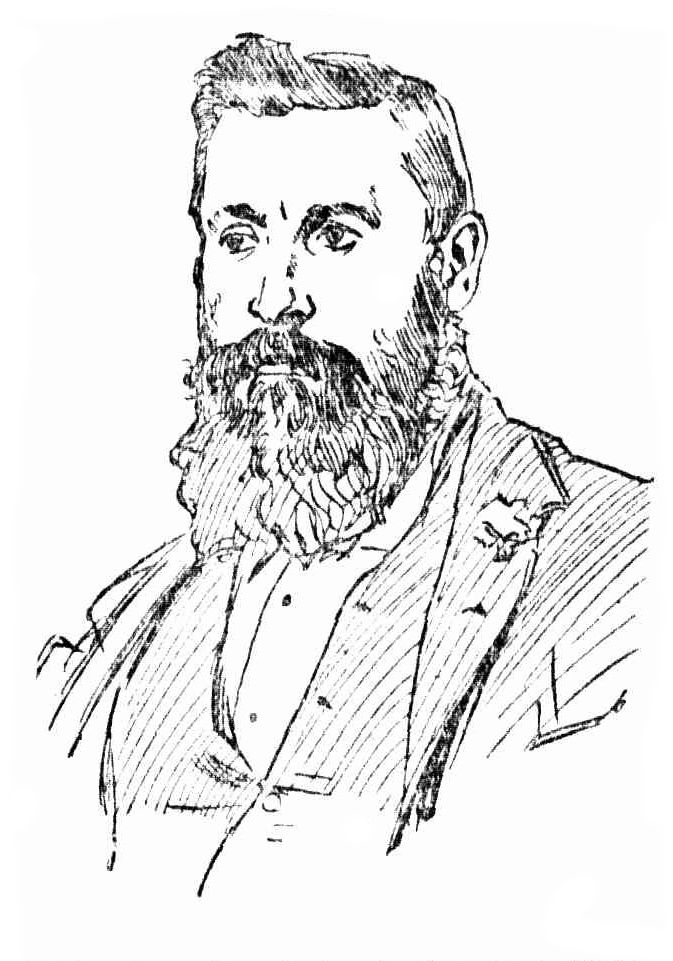
Illustration of Thomas Bavister, published in The Daily Telegraph, 2 August 1894.

In parliament Bavister was a supporter of the initial Labor caucus pledge, based on the trade union tradition of acceptance of decisions freely made at union meetings, whereby it was affirmed that decisions made at caucus meetings would be binding on all parliamentary members. In December 1891 the unity of the Labor party members was tested by a censure motion against the government by George Reid, leader of the Free Trade opposition. There was no unanimity of opinion amongst the Labor Party members on the fiscal issue of free trade versus protectionism, and the debate pitted the concept of party solidarity against members' personal beliefs and their constituents' interests. When the vote on Reid's censure motion was held, all the Labor League members, with the exception of James McGowen, "voted as their fiscal faith guided them", producing a split in the Labor vote. Bavister was one of the seventeen, all supporters of free trade except McGowen, who voted for the censure motion. Sixteen of the protectionist Labor members supported the government by voting against the motion, which was defeated. On 16 December 1891 two separate meetings were held in the wake of the split in the Labor party vote, one by the seventeen 'solidarity' members who considered themselves bona fide labour representatives and the other "by those members who are now regarded as deserters from the party". At the meeting of 'solidarity' members Bavister was appointed secretary of the parliamentary Labor party.

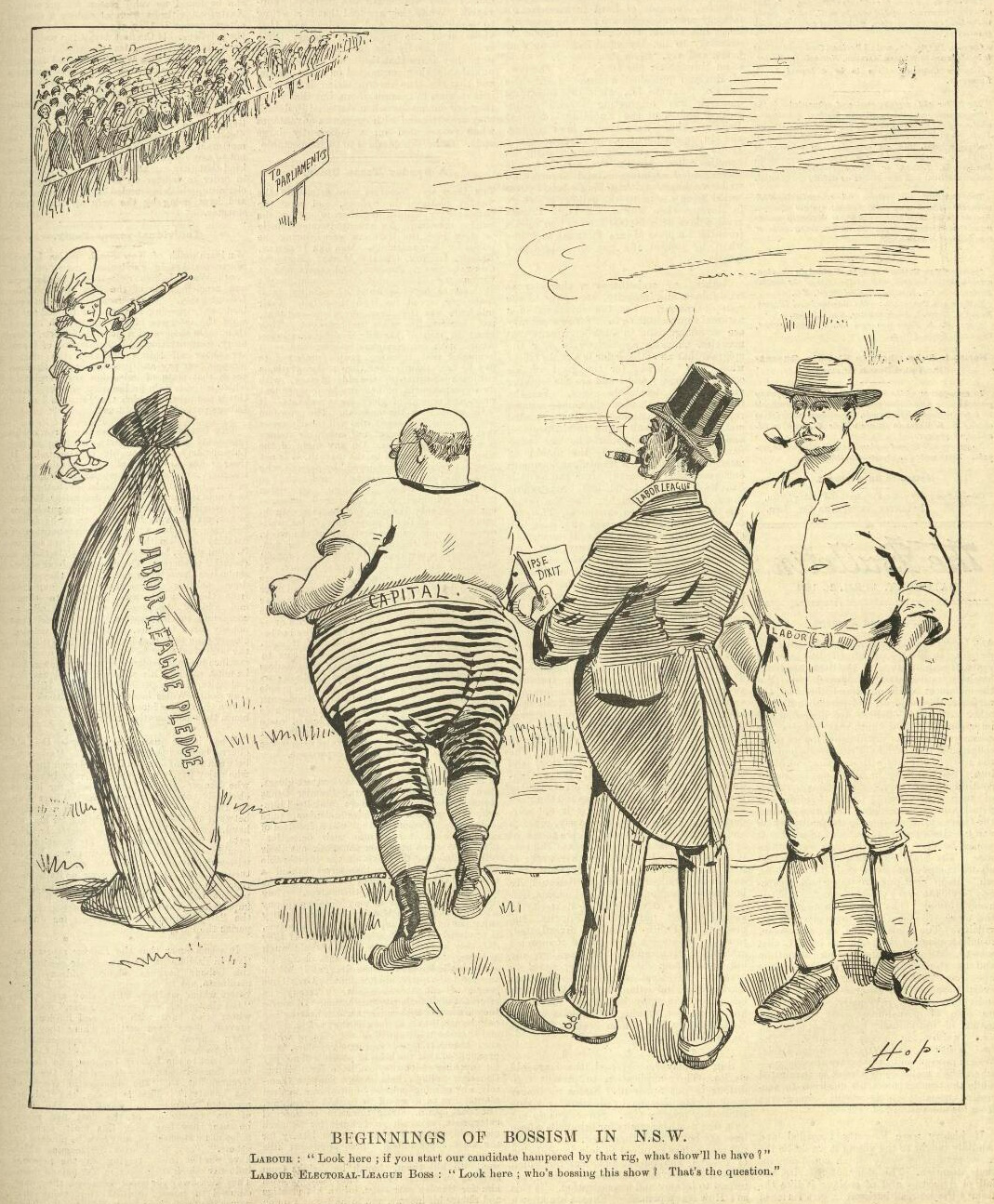
A cartoonist's view of the Labor pledge: 'Beginnings of Bossism in N.S.W.', cartoon by Livingstone ('Hop') Hopkins, published in The Bulletin, 28 April 1894.

In September 1893 the Electoral Districts Commissioners presented their scheme of redistribution of seats under the new Electoral Act before the New South Wales Legislative Assembly. As part of the process, multi-member electorates were abolished and the electorates were realigned and in some cases renamed. The Canterbury electorate was split into the single-member electorates of Canterbury, Ashfield, Burwood, Petersham and St. George.

In November 1893 Bavister was one of nine members of the Legislative Assembly who attended the Labor 'unity conference' in Sydney, organised by the central committee of the Labor Electoral League, intended to resolve internal conflicts and enforce party discipline. The conference chairman Chris Watson played a prominent role in reinforcing the requirement for Labor candidates to sign a pledge of solidarity committing them to vote as a unified caucus. Bavister was one of those who refused to sign the redrafted pledge, leading to a formal split with the 'solidarity' faction remaining as members of the official party.

At the 1894 general election Bavister was a candidate for the Ashfield electorate, one of the single-member constituencies split from the Canterbury electorate. In May 1894 the Labor Electoral League central committee had written to the eighty-four league branches, giving them twenty-one days to agree to adhere to the constitution and not endorse anyone who had not signed the pledge or "be declared bogus". By early June seventy-two of the branches complied, four had refused and eight failed to reply. The Ashfield branch of the Labor Electoral League had chosen Robert Thomson as their candidate but had also accepted "a modified pledge" from Bavister. At a central committee meeting on 7 June the Darlington, Glebe, Ashfield and Hartley branches "were declared bogus because they had not demanded the league pledge from the candidates". A deputation from the Ashfield branch waited upon the central committee in order to place "the position of the branch before the committee", but the meeting concluded with the committee confirming the Ashfield branch to be "bogus". At a subsequent meeting of the Ashfield branch a resolution was passed to use branch resources "to secure the return of Mr. Bavister to parliament". Bavister's candidature had been endorsed by the Free Trade Committee, so he was considered a Free Trade candidate by mainstream newspapers whereas Labor-affiliated newspapers considered him to be an independent Labor candidate. At the election held on 17 July 1894 Bavister was re-elected with 51.4 percent of the vote. Thomson, the official Labor candidate, received just 64 votes (3.3 percent).

At the 1895 general election Bavister stood for the Free Trade Party against John Goodlet, a Sydney timber merchant who ran as an independent candidate. There was no Labor candidate. At the election held on 20 July 1895 Bavister was re-elected with 55.2 percent of the vote.

At the 1898 general election Bavister stood for re-election against one other candidate. His opponent on this occasion was Bernhard R. Wise, a former politician, progressive reformer and barrister, the son of a Supreme Court judge. Wise had previously been a member of the Free Trade Party, but in 1898 he ran as a candidate for the protectionist National Federal Party. At the election held on 21 July 1898 Bavister was defeated by Wise by five votes. With the numbers in the Legislative Assembly subject to shifting alliances, in September 1898 the George Reid's Free Trade Party ministry was replaced by a National Federal Party ministry led by William Lyne. Wise was appointed Attorney-General in the new government, which required a by-election to confirm his position in the parliament. The Ashfield by-election was held on 22 September 1898, contested by Wise and Bavister. On this occasion Bavister fell short by twenty-one votes, with Wise retaining the seat.

In the period 1895 to 1899 Bavister was secretary of the Building Trades Council.

Bavister was employed by the Department of Public Works. In March 1899 it was reported that he was the foreman bricklayer on the work constructing post-office telephone tunnels.

In 1901 Bavister decided to run as a candidate for the electorate of Ashburnham, centred around Forbes and Parkes in the central west of New South Wales. His only opponent was the sitting member Joseph Reymond, who had held the seat since 1895. At the election held on 3 July 1901 Reymond was re-elected with 56 percent of the vote.

=== Later years ===
From 1900 to 1908 Bavister was an active delegate of the Sydney Labor Council.

By 1910 Bavister was foreman of works at Long Bay Gaol.

Thomas Bavister died on 2 January 1923 in a private hospital at Kogarah, aged 72. He was buried in the Methodist section of Rookwood cemetery.

New South Wales Legislative Assembly
Preceded by Alexander Hutchison; John Wheeler; James Wilshire	Member for Canterbury; 1891–1894; Served alongside: Carruthers, Danahey, Eve	Succeeded by Varney Parkes
New title	Member for Ashfield; 1894–1898	Succeeded by Bernhard Wise
