= Montagu Stephen =

Australian politician (1827–1872)

Montagu Consett Stephen (28 April 1827 – 19 May 1872) was an Australian politician.

The Stephen family is a prominent legal dynasty in Australia. Montagu was born in Hobart, the son of Virginia née Consett and Alfred Stephen, who would later become Lieutenant-Governor of NSW and Chief Justice of NSW,. In 1843 he travelled to Tonbridge in England to complete his education, returning to Van Diemen's Land in 1844 and becoming a solicitor's clerk. Admitted as a solicitor in 1849, he practised alone and in partnership until 1864. On 25 May 1853 he married Emily Clara Jennings Smith. Having moved to New South Wales, he worked as solicitor to the Australian Mutual Provident Society and was a Woollahra alderman and mayor. He also held a number of pastoral runs in partnership in Queensland. In 1869 he was elected to the New South Wales Legislative Assembly for Canterbury, but he resigned in 1870. Stephen died in London in 1872.

New South Wales Legislative Assembly
Preceded by James Oatley	Member for Canterbury; 1869–1870; Served alongside: Richard Hill	Succeeded by John Lucas
