= Kevin Stewart (Australian politician) =

Australian politician (1928–2006)

The Honourable Kevin Stewart AO

Minister for Health
- In office 14 May 1976 – 2 October 1981
- Premier: Neville Wran
- Preceded by: Dick Healey
- Succeeded by: Laurie Brereton

Member of the New South Wales Legislative Assembly for Canterbury
- In office 3 March 1962 – 31 December 1985
- Preceded by: Arthur Tonge
- Succeeded by: Kevin Moss

Personal details
- Born: Kevin James Stewart; 20 September 1928 Belmore, New South Wales, Australia
- Died: 22 August 2006 (aged 77) Canterbury, New South Wales, Australia
- Party: Labor
- Spouse: Jean Keating
- Relations: Frank Stewart (brother)
- Children: 5 (f), 2 (s)

Kevin James Stewart AO (20 September 1928 – 22 August 2006), an Australian former politician, was a member of the New South Wales Legislative Assembly representing Canterbury between 1962 and 1985 for the Labor Party. During his period in office, Stewart held a range of ministerial portfolios, including as Minister for Health and Local Government.

His brother, Frank Stewart, was a member of the Australian House of Representatives representing Lang and later Grayndler between 1953 and 1979, also for Labor.

== Early career and background ==
Kevin Stewart was born in Belmore, New South Wales. His father, Patrick Francis Stewart was a public servant. Both Kevin and Frank Stewart were educated at Christian Brothers' High School, Lewisham and De La Salle College, Marrickville.

A member of the ALP from the early age of 17, Kevin was employed by the New South Wales Government Railways from 1944 till his election to parliament. He was an official in the Australasian Transport Officers' Association.

== Political career ==
Stewart defeated Arthur Tonge, the sitting member for Canterbury, in Labor pre-selection and was subsequently elected as the member at the 1962 general election. With the election of the Wran government in 1976, Stewart became the Minister for Health. He retained this position until 1981. His term of office was marked by an attempt to redistribute health resources away from the inner city of Sydney and to areas of New South Wales with rapidly growing populations, particularly the western suburbs of Sydney.

Stewart subsequently served as Minister for Youth and Community Services (1981–1983), Minister for Mineral Resources (1983–1984) and Minister for Local Government (1984–1985). He retained this seat until he was obliged to resign from parliament in 1985 after being appointed New South Wales Agent-General in London, where he served until 1988.

In the 1989 Australia Day honours list, Stewart was made an Officer of the Order of Australia (AO).

Stewart died age 77 in Sydney in August 2006.

== Canterbury Bankstown Bulldogs (Rugby League) ==
Patrick Francis Stewart, the father of both Kevin and Frank Stewart, was the founding president of the Canterbury Bankstown Leagues Club. The Stewart family's members have been long-term supporters of the Canterbury Bankstown Bulldogs. In recognition of this support, the grandstand at Belmore Sports Ground (the former home ground of the club) is named the "Stewart Stand" after Patrick, Frank, and Kevin Stewart.

Following an incident where Canterbury Bankstown Bulldogs football club was stripped of all points in the National Rugby League competition for breach of the salary cap, Kevin Stewart was appointed chairman of the board in 2002. This appointment was made in an attempt to restore the clubs' reputation. For his service to rugby league, on 8 February 2000 he was awarded the Australian Sports Medal.

New South Wales Legislative Assembly
Preceded by Arthur Tonge	Member for Canterbury; 1962–1985	Succeeded by Kevin Moss
Political offices
Preceded by Dick Healey	Minister for Health; 1976–1981	Succeeded by Laurie Brereton
Preceded by Rex Jackson	Minister for Youth and Community Services; 1981–1983	Succeeded by Frank Walker
Preceded by Neville Wran	Minister for Mineral Resources; 1983–1984	Succeeded by Don Day
Preceded by Lin Gordon	Minister for Local Government; 1984–1985	Succeeded by Peter Anderson
Diplomatic posts
Preceded by Reginald F. Watson	Agent-General for New South Wales; 1986–1988	Succeeded by Norman Brunsdon
Sporting positions
Preceded by	President of the Canterbury-Bankstown Bulldogs; 2002–2006	Succeeded by
