= William Pigott =

Politician and solicitor in New South Wales, Australia

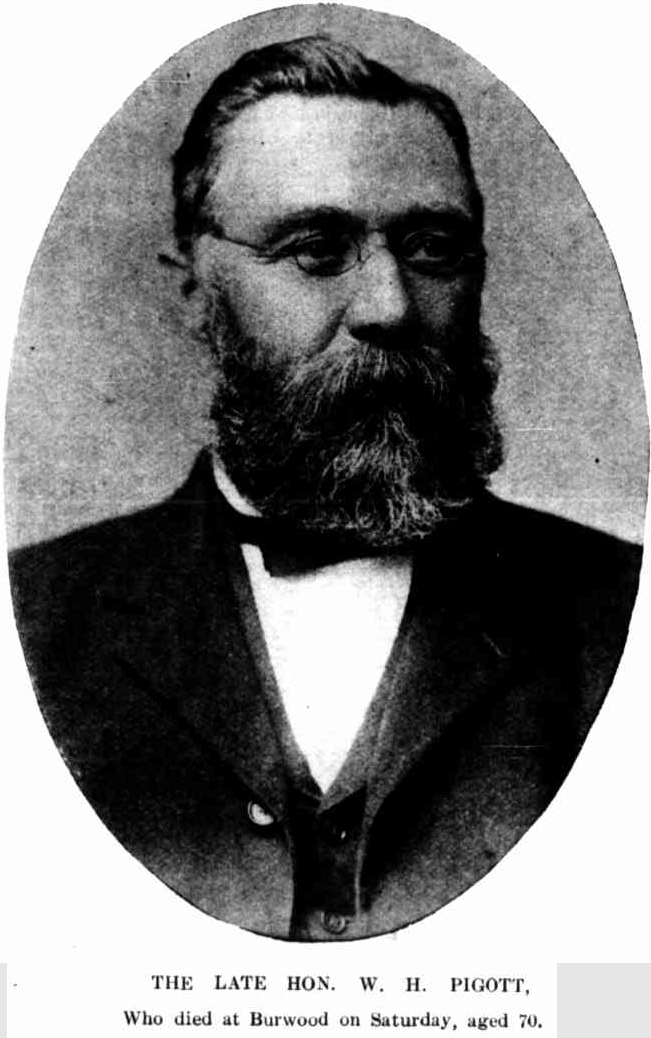

William Hilson Pigott (10 March 1839 – 13 March 1909) was an English-born Australian politician.

He was born in London to cabinet maker John Allpress Pigott and Margaret Hilson. His family moved to New South Wales in 1841 and Pigott became a solicitor's clerk, qualifying as a solicitor in 1863. In 1863 he married Laura Jane West, with whom he had two sons; a second marriage in 1883 to Louisa Matilda Jones produced a daughter. He practised as a solicitor in Grafton until joining a Sydney firm in 1864. A long-serving Petersham alderman, he was the first mayor from 1872 to 1880. In 1880 he was elected to the New South Wales Legislative Assembly for Canterbury, serving until his resignation in 1884, due to ill health. He was appointed to the New South Wales Legislative Council in 1887, serving until 1907. He was president of the Incorporated Law Institute of New South Wales from 1892 until 1908.

Pigott died at Croydon in 1909 (aged 70).

Civic offices
New title Council proclaimed	Mayor of Petersham; 1872 – 1880	Succeeded by Michael McMahon
New South Wales Legislative Assembly
Preceded by John Lucas; Sir Henry Parkes	Member for Canterbury; 1880 – 1884; With: William Henson / Henry Moses; Septimus Stephen	Succeeded by Mark Hammond
