= Joseph Carruthers =

Australian politician (1857–1932)

The Honourable Sir Joseph Carruthers KCMG
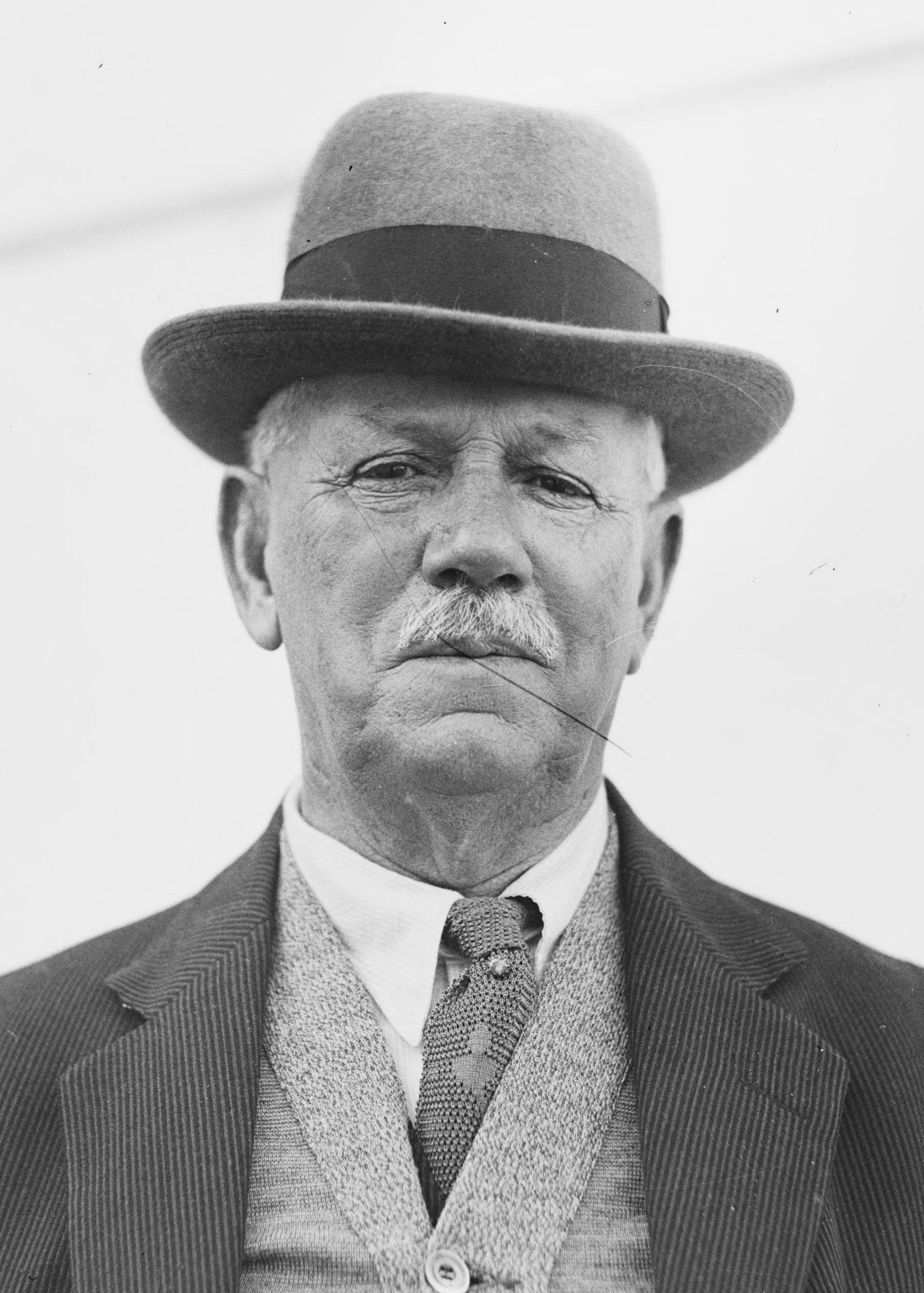
- Carruthers in 1931

16th Premier of New South Wales
- In office 29 August 1904 – 1 October 1907
- Monarch: Edward VII
- Governor: Sir Harry Rawson
- Preceded by: Thomas Waddell
- Succeeded by: Charles Wade

Personal details
- Born: 21 December 1857 Kiama, New South Wales
- Died: 10 December 1932 (aged 74) Waverley, Sydney, New South Wales
- Party: Liberal and Reform Association
- Spouse(s): Louise Marion Roberts m. 1879 dis. 1895; Alice Burnett m. 1898
- Children: 4(m), 4(f)

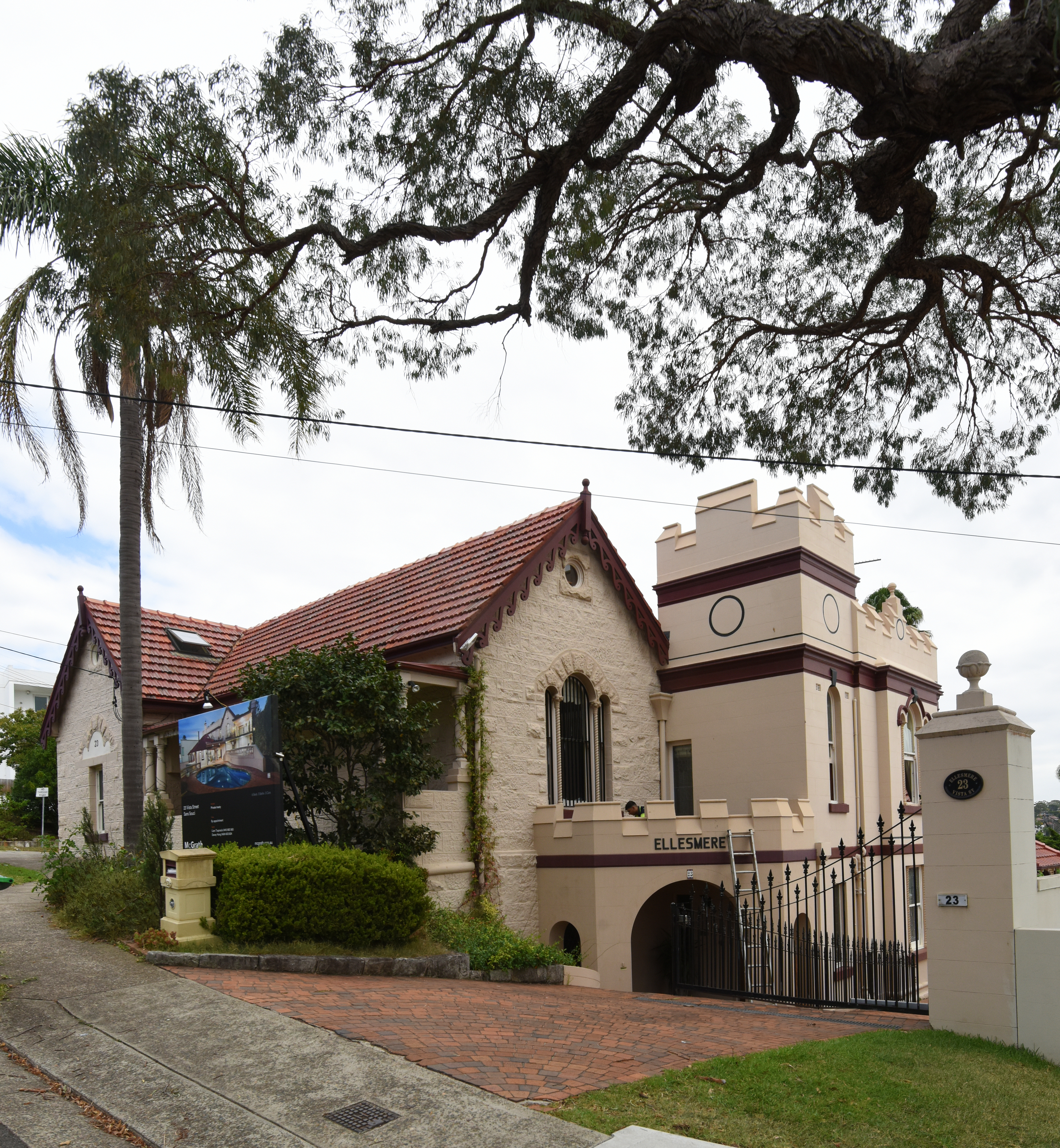
Ellesmere, heritage-listed home of Sir Joseph Carruthers in the Sydney suburb of Sans Souci

Sir Joseph Hector McNeil Carruthers KCMG (21 December 1857 – 10 December 1932) was an Australian politician who served as Premier of New South Wales from 1904 to 1907.

Carruthers is perhaps best remembered for founding the Liberal and Reform Association, the forerunner to the modern Liberal Party of Australia (New South Wales Division). Zachary Gorman has argued that Carruthers played a central role in re-orientating Australian liberalism to sit on the centre-right of the political divide, influencing political developments at both the Federal and State level.

== Early years ==
Carruthers was born in Kiama, New South Wales to Charlotte née Prince and John Carruthers. He attended William Street National School and Fort Street High School in Sydney. After boarding at George Metcalfe's High School, Goulburn, he went up to the University of Sydney and graduated with a Bachelor of Arts in 1876. He took his Master of Arts degree two years later and was admitted to practice as a solicitor, where he remained for some years. While at the University he was a prominent cricketer and rugby union footballer, leading attempts by the Sydney University Football Club in 1877-78 to have the NSW Rugby Union switch to the Australian rules code. In December 1879, Carruthers married Louise Marion Roberts.

== Political career ==
In 1887, Carruthers obtained the most votes for the four-member Legislative Assembly seat of Canterbury, on a platform of local issues, free trade, social reform, land reform, industrial conciliation and arbitration, and an elective Legislative Council. He held Canterbury until 1894, when he switched to the new seat of St George. After a successful election largely co-ordinated by Carruthers the Reid ministry was formed in August 1894. Carruthers was given the position of Secretary for Lands, and passed the important Crown Lands Act 1895.

In 1895, he divorced his wife and was granted custody of their children. In 1897, in the Truth, John Norton accused him of irregularities in his divorce, immorality in his private life, and land abuses as Secretary for Lands. Norton was prosecuted for criminal libel but the jury could not agree on a verdict.

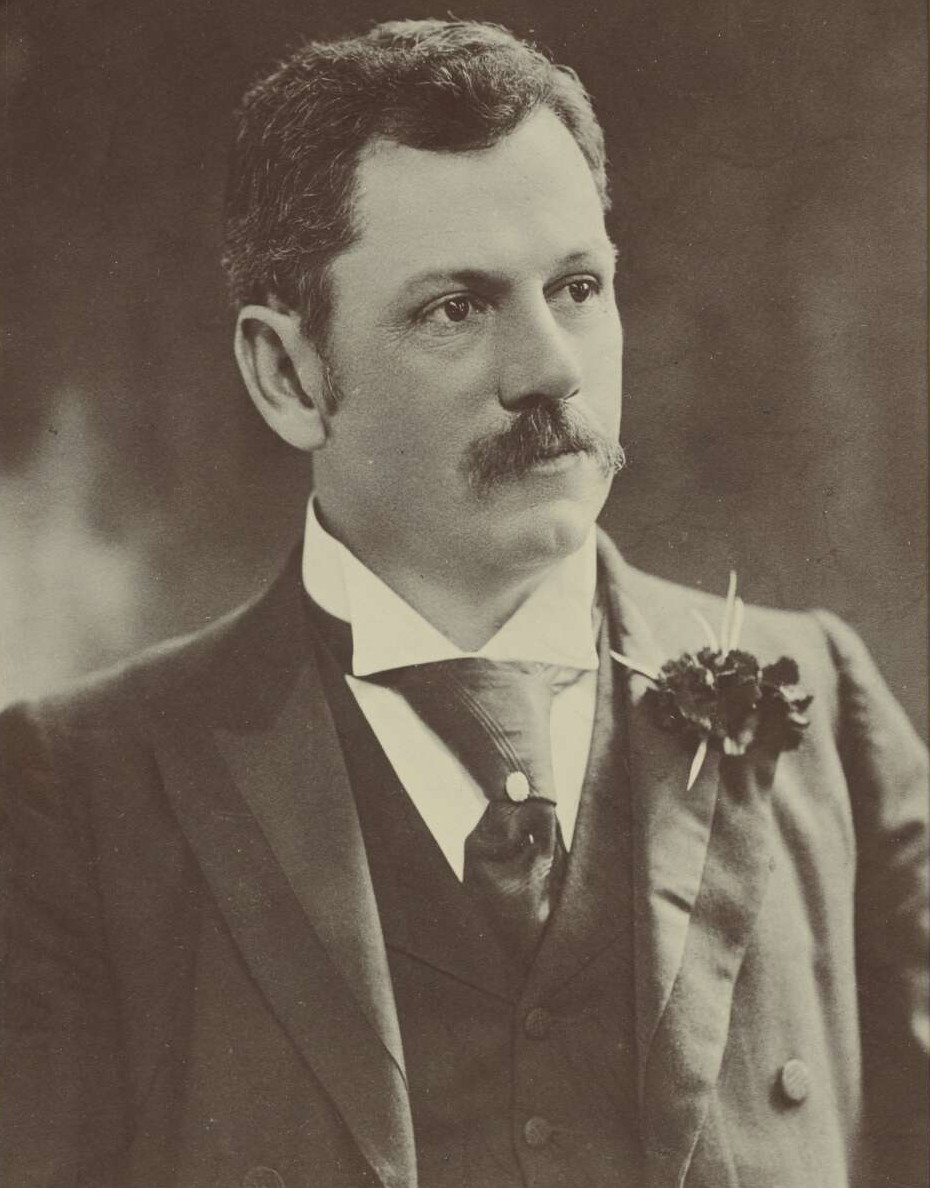
Carruthers in 1898

== Premier ==
Carruthers around 1904.

When the Federation was established in 1901, Reid went to the Federal House and was replaced as leader by Charles Lee. Lee was not very successful and soon Carruthers replaced him as leader of the New South Wales opposition, creating the Liberal and Reform Association as the successor to the Free Trade Party. The LRA had an innovative structure, with mass membership, coordinated campaign strategies and a permanent executive. Carruthers had deliberately moved the party away from the tariff issue, which was now a Federal responsibility, and established a broad platform embodying the principles of Gladstonian classical liberalism. He positioned his support for enterprise and economic freedom against what he saw as the increasingly socialistic policies of the Progressive Minister for Public Works Edward William O'Sullivan and the Labor Party, arguing that politics required clear 'lines of cleavage' with a two-party system to give people a clear choice at elections. In doing so Carruthers placed his liberal party on the centre-right of the political divide, a move George Reid would copy with his federal anti-socialist campaign.

Carruthers party won the July 1904 election on "an alliance of Liberalism, temperance and Protestantism". The middle Progressive Party was isolated by Carruthers 'lines of cleavage' rhetoric, leaving them with only 16 seats. This new tier of government was set up without a significant increase in taxation, as the existing land tax was transferred to become council rates. In 1907 Carruthers even promised to abolish the income tax, a policy his successor Charles Wade would partially follow through with, abolishing the tax for incomes under £1000. A beginning was also made on the Burrinjuck irrigation dam. In 1907, Carruthers succeeded in forcing a "fusion" of much of the Progressive Party with the LRA, further cementing the liberals as the main opposition to the Labor Party in New South Wales.

Curruthers and the New South Wales Government that he led were strongly opposed to the selection of Dalgety, as the site of Australia's national capital, under the Seat of Government Act 1904. Their opposition to Dalgety and preference for a site in the 'Yass-Canberra' area was important in the later selection of Canberra.

He persuaded William Sandford to agree to William Sandford Limited contracting to supply all of the New South Wales Government's needs for iron and steel, for a seven-year period, in 1905. Most of this steel would be in the form of heavy steel rails for railways. A condition of that contract was that local iron ore, coal and limestone were to be used to produce iron, necessitating the erection of a blast furnace and the opening of an iron ore mine. Curruthers officially opened the blast furnace at Lithgow, in May 1907, an event that began the modern iron and steel industry in Australia.

In 1905–06, a royal commission inquired into land scandals and investigated accusations made against Carruthers and the behaviour of his law firm. He testified before it eight times. The commissioner found that nothing in the evidence implicated Carruthers, but he gave up his law practice for a few years. These accusations were raised again in the 1907 election. To distract attention, even suggestion secession, he launched an attack on the Federal Government's recent increase in tariffs, particularly on wire-netting.

He did not hold office again for many years and controversially suggested during World War I that New South Welshmen "ought to go down on (our) knees and pray (to) God to give us another Cromwell, who will send our Parliaments and our Politicians to the roundabout". As part of that role, he steered the Sydney Harbour Bridge Bill through what was at times quite a hostile Legislative Council. He died on 10 December 1932. A state funeral was attended by many notable Sydney citizens at All Saints Church, Woollahra on 12 December 1932, and later at his burial at South Head Cemetery.

== Assessment ==
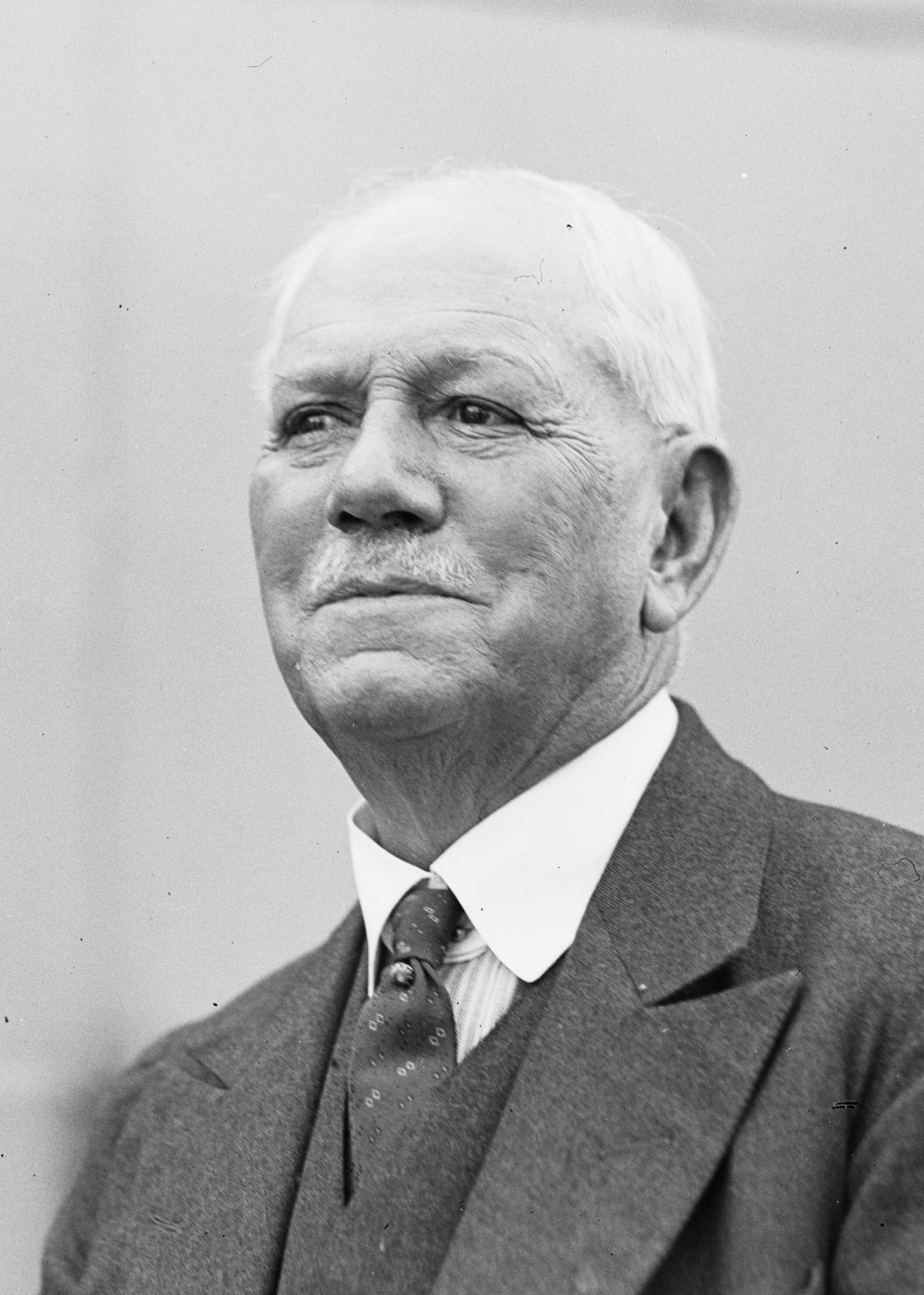
Carruthers c. 1930 as a legislative councillor

Though he never entered Federal politics, Carruthers was one of the most important politicians of his era. As Reid's effective deputy he rallied free traders to the Federation cause, successfully resisted Deakin's plan to establish the Federal capital at Dalgety, instituted NSW's system of local government, and in later years led the fight against the abolition of the Legislative Council. In this way, he directly influenced the composition of all three tiers of government. Carruthers was a successful Premier, laying a pattern of how liberal governments would operate. Most importantly, the LRA largely endures in the modern NSW Liberal Party. He was a friend of Frederick Earle Winchcombe, who was the founding President of the Wildlife Preservation Society of Australia. Carruthers followed Winchcombe as President of the Society in 1911, serving only one term of office.

Always a popular MP with his constituents, Carruthers has by later commentators been judged "a peppery little man" (John La Nauze) of "untiring energy" (Percival Serle).

== Honours ==
Carruthers was created a Knight Commander of the Order of St Michael and St George (KCMG) in 1908.

New South Wales Legislative Assembly
Preceded by Septimus Stephen	Member for Canterbury; 1887 – 1894; With: Davis/Wilshire/Danahey, Hutchison/Bavister, Henson/Wheeler/Eve	Succeeded by Varney Parkes
New district	Member for St George; 1894 – 1908	Succeeded by William Taylor
Political offices
Preceded by Francis Suttor	Minister of Public Instruction; 1889 – 1891	Succeeded by Francis Suttor
Preceded by Henry Copeland	Secretary for Lands; 1894 – 1899	Succeeded by James Young
Preceded by Sir George Reid	Colonial Treasurer; 1899	Succeeded by Sir William Lyne
Preceded by Charles Lee	Leader of the Opposition of New South Wales; 1902 – 1904	Succeeded by James McGowen
Preceded by Thomas Waddell	Premier of New South Wales; 1904 – 1907	Succeeded by Charles Wade
Preceded by Thomas Waddell	Colonial Treasurer; 1904 – 1907	Succeeded by Thomas Waddell
Preceded by Edward Kavanagh	Vice-President of the Executive Council; 1921	Succeeded by Edward Kavanagh
Preceded by Edward Kavanagh	Vice-President of the Executive Council; 1922 – 1925	Succeeded by Albert Willis
Party political offices
Preceded by Charles Lee	Leader of the Liberal Reform Party; 1901 – 1907	Succeeded by Charles Wade
