= John Lucas (Australian politician) =

Australian politician (1818–1902)

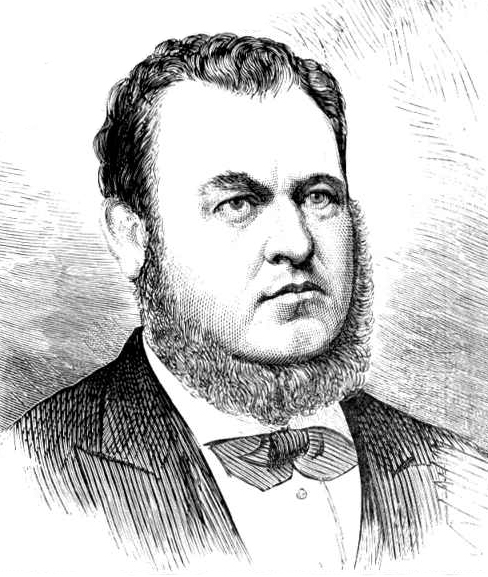
- 1875 engraving
- Born: June 24, 1818; Camperdown
- Died: 1 March 1902 (aged 83); Camperdown

John Lucas (24 June 1818 – 1 March 1902) was a builder and politician in colonial New South Wales, a member of both the Legislative Assembly and Legislative Council.

== Early life ==
Lucas was born on 24 June 1818 at Kingston, part of Camperdown, to John Lucas, a miller and builder, and Mary née Rowley, a daughter of Thomas Rowley. He was educated at a Church of England school in Liverpool, and Captain Beveridge's boarding school. He left school to be apprenticed as a carpenter, the trade of his grandfather Nathaniel Lucas.

== Political career ==
He first stood for the Legislative Assembly at the 1859 election for Canterbury, but was unsuccessful. He won the seat at the 1860 by-election, holding it at the 1860 general election. In December 1864 he was elected to both Canterbury, and Hartley, choosing to represent Hartley. He was defeated in an attempt to return to Canterbury at the election in December 1869. He regained a seat in the assembly at the 1871 Canterbury by-election, serving until his retirement in 1880. His only ministerial appointment was as Secretary for Mines in the third Robertson ministry from February 1875 until March 1877. He was appointed to the Legislative Council in 1880 and served until his death.

== Personal life ==
He married Ann Sammons on 4 January 1841 at Singleton, and they had five children.

He was noted patron of the Jenolan Caves in the Blue Mountains where a cave and a tour have since been named in his honour. He also maintained a holiday cottage on Lapstone Hill at the Eastern edge of the Blue Mountains. On the original Lapstone Zig Zag a station was built for him and named Lucasville. The remains of the station are still visible today.

Lucas died at Camperdown on 1 March 1902 (aged 83).

Political offices
Preceded by Robert Abbott	Secretary for Mines; 1875 – 1877	Succeeded by George Lloyd
New South Wales Legislative Assembly
Preceded by Edward Flood	Member for Canterbury; 1860 – 1865; With: Samuel Lyons / Edward Raper	Succeeded by James Pemell
Preceded by Henry Rotton	Member for Hartley; 1864 – 1869	Succeeded by James Neale
Preceded by Montagu Stephen	Member for Canterbury; 1871 – 1880; With: Richard Hill / Sir Henry Parkes	Succeeded by William Pigott; William Henson
