= James Pemell =

English-born Australian politician

James Pemell (1816 – 26 March 1906) was an English-born Australian politician.

He was born in London to baker James Pemell and his wife Maria. He migrated to New South Wales around 1836 and like his father worked as a baker. On 24 December 1839 he married widow Jane Fish, with whom he had three children. In 1859 he was elected to the New South Wales Legislative Assembly for West Sydney, but he did not re-contest in 1860. He returned to the Assembly for Canterbury in 1865, but resigned in 1869. Pemell died at Newtown in 1906.

New South Wales Legislative Assembly
| New seat | Member for West Sydney; 1859–1860; Served alongside: Broughton, Lang, Plunkett | Succeeded by Daniel Dalgleish; William Love; William Windeyer |
| Preceded by John Lucas | Member for Canterbury; 1865–1869; Served alongside: James Oatley | Succeeded by Richard Hill |
