= James Eve =

Australian politician

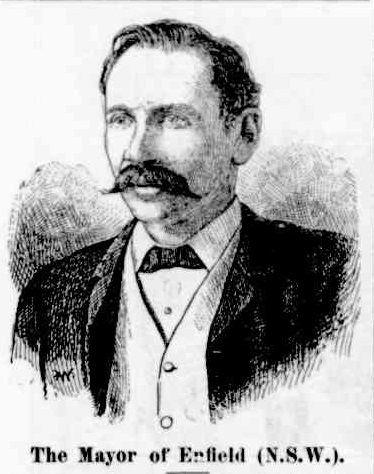
Sketch of Eve in the Australian Town and Country Journal, 18 May 1889.

James Eve (1837 – 25 September 1911) was an English-born Australian politician.

He was born at Maldon in Essex to farmer James Eve and Lilian Dowsett. He arrived in New South Wales around 1861, worked for a period as a porter and then became a tobacconist at Enfield. On 28 August 1865 he married Martha Nairn at Redfern; they had ten children.

He was a local alderman and served as mayor of the Municipality of Enfield in 1889. He was a candidate at the 1891 election for the district of Canterbury. Whilst he was a Free Trader, he was not one of the four candidates nominated by the party, and was supported by a local branch, the Canterbury Electoral Freetrade Council. The election had been close with only 105 votes separating Thomas Bavister elected 2nd and Eve in 5th place, five votes behind John Wheeler, one of the official Free Trade candidates, who had been elected 4th. Eve lodged a petition against the election of Wheeler. The Elections and Qualifications Committee conducted a re-count which overturned the result and declared that Eve had been elected.

He did not contest the 1894 election, but ran unsuccessfully in 1895 (Marrickville), 1898 (Burwood) and 1907 (Ashfield). Eve died at Mosman on 25 September 1911.

Civic offices
New title	Mayor of Enfield; 1889 – 1891	Succeeded by Thomas Hodson
New South Wales Legislative Assembly
Preceded by John Wheeler	Member for Canterbury; 1891 – 1894; Served alongside: Bavister, Carruthers, Danahey	Succeeded by Varney Parkes
