= Electoral district of Canterbury =

State electoral district of New South Wales, Australia

Canterbury New South Wales—Legislative Assembly
- Interactive map of district boundaries from the 2023 state election
- State: New South Wales
- Dates current: 1859–1920, 1927–present
- MP: Sophie Cotsis
- Party: Labor Party
- Namesake: Canterbury, New South Wales
- Electors: 57,164 (2019)
- Area: 18 km^{2} (6.9 sq mi)
- Demographic: Inner metropolitan
Electorates around Canterbury:
Bankstown	Strathfield	Summer Hill
Bankstown	Canterbury	Heffron
Oatley	Kogarah	Rockdale

Canterbury is an electoral district of the Legislative Assembly in the Australian state of New South Wales, currently represented by Sophie Cotsis of the Labor Party.

== Geography ==
On its current boundaries, Canterbury includes the suburbs of Belmore, Campsie, Canterbury, Clemton Park, Earlwood, Lakemba, Undercliffe, and parts of Beverly Hills, Kingsgrove, Roselands, and Wiley Park.

== History ==
Canterbury was created in 1859, replacing part of Cumberland (South Riding), named after and including the then town, now Sydney suburb, of Canterbury. It was bordered on the east by Glebe and Newtown, and from 1880, Balmain and Redfern and stretched in the north to Drummoyne and Rhodes, south to Georges River and west to a line between Salt Pan Creek and Homebush Bay. It was a multi-member electorate, electing two members until 1882 and then four members until the abolition of multi-member electorates in 1894, when it was split into Canterbury, Ashfield, Burwood, Petersham and St George. It was abolished in 1920, with the introduction of proportional representation and absorbed into St George. It was recreated in 1927, and has been held by Labor for all but one term since. In recent decades it has become one of Labor's safest seats.

== Members for Canterbury ==
=== First incarnation (1859-1920) ===
1859–1882, 2 members
Member	Party	Term	Member	Party	Term						
Edward Flood	None	1859–1860	Samuel Lyons	None	1859–1860						
John Lucas	None	1860–1865	Edward Raper	None	1860–1864						
John Lucas	None	1860–1865	James Oatley	None	1864–1869						
James Pemell	None	1865–1868	James Oatley	None	1864–1869						
Richard Hill	None	1868–1877	James Oatley	None	1864–1869						
Richard Hill	None	1868–1877	Montagu Stephen	None	1869–1870						
Richard Hill	None	1868–1877	John Lucas	None	1871–1880						
Henry Parkes	None	1877–1880	John Lucas	None	1871–1880						
William Pigott	None	1880–1882	William Henson	None	1880–1882						
1882–1885, 3 members
Member	Party	Term	Member	Party	Term	Member	Party	Term			
William Pigott	None	1882–1884	Henry Moses	None	1882–1885	Septimus Stephen	None	1882–1885			
Mark Hammond	None	1884–1885	Henry Moses	None	1882–1885	Septimus Stephen	None	1882–1885			
Mark Hammond	None	1884–1885	William Henson	None	1885–1885	Septimus Stephen	None	1882–1885			
1885–1894, 4 members
Member	Party	Term	Member	Party	Term	Member	Party	Term	Member	Party	Term
Mark Hammond	None	1885–1887	William Henson	None	1885–1887	Septimus Stephen	None	1885–1887	William Judd	None	1885–1887
William Lovel Davis	Free Trade	1887–1889	William Henson	Free Trade	1887–1889	Alexander Hutchison	Free Trade	1887–1891	Joseph Carruthers	Free Trade	1887–1894
James Wilshire	Free Trade	1889–1891	John Wheeler	Free Trade	1889–1891	Alexander Hutchison	Free Trade	1887–1891	Joseph Carruthers	Free Trade	1887–1894
Cornelius Danahey	Labor	1891–1894	James Eve	Free Trade	1891–1894	Thomas Bavister	Labor	1891–1894	Joseph Carruthers	Free Trade	1887–1894
1894–1920, 1 member
Member	Party	Term									
Varney Parkes	Free Trade	1894–1900									
Sydney Smith	Free Trade	1900–1900									
Thomas Taylor	Independent	1900–1901									
Thomas Mackenzie	Liberal Reform	1901–1907									
Varney Parkes	Independent Liberal	1907–1907									
Varney Parkes	Liberal Reform	1907–1913									
Henry Peters	Labor	1913–1914									
George Cann	Labor	1914–1920									
=== Second incarnation (1927-present) ===
1927–present, 1 member
Member	Party	Term									
Arthur Tonge	Labor	1927–1932									
Edward Hocking	United Australia	1932–1935									
Arthur Tonge	Labor	1935–1962									
Kevin Stewart	Labor	1962–1985									
Kevin Moss	Labor	1986–2003									
Linda Burney	Labor	2003–2016									
Sophie Cotsis	Labor	2016–present									

== Election results ==
2023 New South Wales state election: Canterbury
Party	Candidate	Votes	%	±%
Labor	Sophie Cotsis	28,892	59.8	+6.2
Liberal	Nemr Boumansour	8,341	17.3	−12.5
Greens	Bradley Schott	4,354	9.0	−2.2
Liberal Democrats	Vanessa Hadchiti	3,941	8.2	+8.2
Sustainable Australia	Joe Sinacori	1,379	2.9	+2.9
Animal Justice	Kacey King	1,376	2.8	+2.6
Total formal votes		48,283	95.3	−0.1
Informal votes		2,386	4.7	+0.1
Turnout		50,669	86.5	−0.2
Two-party-preferred result
Labor	Sophie Cotsis	32,829	75.8	+10.5
Liberal	Nemr Boumansour	10,494	24.2	−10.5
Labor hold		Swing	+10.5	
