= List of judges of the Supreme Court of New South Wales =

Judges who have served on the Supreme Court of NSW as of February 2020 include :

- Current judges
- Chief justices of NSW
- Presidents of the NSW Court of Appeal
- Chief judges in equity
- Chief judges in common law
- Judges of appeal
- Acting judges (Note: The dates for acting judges and acting judges of appeal are from the date of their first commission until the date of their last commission. The judge may not have had a commission for the entire period and may not have sat throughout that period. From 1918 until 1990 a judge was required to retire at age 70. Since 1990 a judge is required to retire at age 72 but may be appointed an acting judge until age 77.)
- Masters / Associate judges

It does not include Judge Advocates of NSW who sat on the Court of Civil Jurisdiction between 1788 and 1814 nor judges of the Supreme Court of Civil Judicature of NSW between 1814 and 1823.

Position	Name	Appointment commenced	Appointment ended	Term in office	Comments	Notes
Chief Justice	Sir Francis Forbes	13 October 1823	1 July 1837	13 years, 261 days		
Chief Justice	Sir James Dowling (Note: James Sheen Dowling was the son of Chief Justice Sir James Dowling.)	30 August 1837	27 September 1844	7 years, 28 days		
Chief Justice	Sir Alfred Stephen (Note: The Stephen family is a prominent legal dynasty in Australia. John Stephen was the father of Sir Alfred Stephen, grandfather of (Matthew) Henry Stephen and great grandfather of Edward Milner Stephen.)	14 November 1845	5 November 1873	27 years, 356 days		
Chief Justice	Sir James Martin	19 November 1873	4 November 1886	12 years, 350 days		
Chief Justice	Sir Julian Salomons	12 November 1886	27 November 1886	15 days		
Chief Justice	Sir Frederick Darley	29 November 1886	4 January 1910	23 years, 36 days		
Chief Justice	Sir William Cullen	28 January 1910	27 January 1925	14 years, 365 days		
Chief Justice	Sir Philip Street (Note: The Street family is a prominent legal dynasty in Australia. Sir Philip Street was the father of Sir Kenneth Street and the grandfather of Sir Laurence Street)	28 January 1925	31 January 1934	9 years, 3 days		
Chief Justice	Sir Frederick Jordan	1 February 1934	4 November 1949	15 years, 276 days		
Chief Justice	Sir Kenneth Street	6 January 1950	27 January 1960	10 years, 21 days		
Chief Justice	Herbert Evatt	15 February 1960	24 October 1962	2 years, 251 days		
Chief Justice	Sir Leslie Herron	25 October 1962	22 May 1972	9 years, 210 days		
Chief Justice	Sir John Kerr	23 May 1972	27 June 1974	2 years, 35 days	Appointed Governor-General	
Chief Justice	Sir Laurence Street	28 June 1974	1 November 1988	14 years, 126 days		
Chief Justice	Murray Gleeson (Note: Fabian Gleeson is the son of Gerald Gleeson, the former Secretary of the NSW Premier's Department & brother of Justin Gleeson, the former Solicitor-General of Australia and is unrelated to Murray Gleeson whose daughter Jacqueline Gleeson is a judge of the Federal Court.)	2 November 1988	21 May 1998	9 years, 200 days	Appointed Chief Justice of Australia	
Chief Justice	James Spigelman	19 May 1998	25 May 2011	13 years, 6 days		
Chief Justice	Tom Bathurst	1 June 2011	5 March 2022	15 years, 168 days		
Chief Justice	Andrew Bell	5 March 2022		4 years, 256 days	President of the Court of Appeal (2019–2022)	
Acting Chief Justice	John Stephen	22 February 1826	27 May 1826	94 days		
Acting Chief Justice	Sir James Dowling	16 April 1836	29 August 1837	1 year, 135 days		
Acting Chief Justice	Sir Alfred Stephen	7 October 1844	13 November 1845	1 year, 37 days		
Acting Chief Justice	Sir John Dickinson	15 February 1860	17 February 1861	1 year, 2 days		
Acting Chief Justice	Henry Stephen	16 June 1902	25 February 1904	1 year, 254 days		
Acting Chief Justice	Sir George Simpson	1 February 1909	4 January 1910	337 days		
Acting Chief Justice	Robert Pring	17 April 1918	15 May 1918	28 days		
Acting Chief Justice	Sir Philip Street	28 July 1924	27 January 1925	183 days		
Acting Chief Justice	Sir David Ferguson	1 February 1929	31 December 1929	333 days		
Acting Chief Justice	Sir John Harvey	30 June 1933	31 January 1934	215 days		
Acting Chief Justice	Sir Kenneth Street	16 September 1949	4 November 1949	49 days		
Acting Chief Justice	Sir Leslie Herron	12 March 1962	24 October 1962	226 days		
Acting Chief Justice	John Clancy	8 October 1964	5 February 1965	120 days		
Acting Chief Justice	Sir Gordon Wallace	1 October 1968	3 February 1969	125 days		
Acting Chief Justice	Sir Bernard Sugerman	10 August 1970	11 October 1970	62 days		
Acting Chief Justice	Sir Laurence Street	28 May 1974	16 June 1974	19 days		
Acting Chief Justice	Athol Moffitt	16 August 1979	16 September 1979	31 days		
Acting Chief Justice	Michael Kirby (Note: Michael Kirby is the elder brother of David Kirby.)	4 July 1988; 7 October 1993; 9 July 1995	28 July 1988; 5 November 1993; 4 August 1995	24 days 29 days 26 days	Appointed to the High Court	
Acting Chief Justice	Dennis Mahoney	16 August 1996	1 November 1996	77 days		
Acting Chief Justice	Keith Mason	31 October 1998	14 November 1998	14 days		
President, Court of Appeal	Sir Gordon Wallace	1 January 1966	21 January 1970	4 years, 20 days		
President, Court of Appeal	Sir Bernard Sugerman	2 January 1970	30 September 1972	2 years, 272 days		
President, Court of Appeal	Sir Kenneth Jacobs	1 October 1972	7 February 1974	1 year, 129 days	Appointed to the High Court	
President, Court of Appeal	Athol Moffitt	8 February 1974	25 June 1984	10 years, 138 days		
President, Court of Appeal	Michael Kirby	24 September 1984	2 February 1996	11 years, 131 days	Appointed to the High Court	
President, Court of Appeal	Dennis Mahoney	19 February 1996	3 February 1997	350 days		
President, Court of Appeal	Keith Mason	4 February 1997	30 May 2008	11 years, 116 days		
President, Court of Appeal	James Allsop	2 June 2008	28 February 2013	4 years, 271 days	Judge of the Federal Court (2001–2008); Appointed Chief Justice of the Federal Court)	
President, Court of Appeal	Margaret Beazley	1 March 2013	28 February 2019	5 years, 364 days	Acting Judge of the District Court of NSW (1990–1991); Assistant Commissioner Independent Commission Against Corruption (1991–1992); Judge of the Federal Court (1993–1996); Appointed Governor of NSW	
President, Court of Appeal	Andrew Bell	28 February 2019	5 March 2022	3 years, 5 days	Appointed Chief Justice	
President, Court of Appeal	Julie Ward	5 March 2022		4 years, 256 days	Chief Judge in Equity (2017–2022)	
Judge of Appeal	Sir Kenneth Jacobs	1 January 1966	7 February 1974	8 years, 37 days	Appointed to the High Court	
Judge of Appeal	Sir Bernard Sugerman	1 January 1966	30 September 1972	6 years, 273 days		
Judge of Appeal	Charles McLelland	1 January 1966	28 April 1973	7 years, 117 days		
Judge of Appeal	Cyril Walsh	1 January 1966	2 October 1969	15 years, 236 days	Appointed to the High Court	
Judge of Appeal	John Holmes	1 January 1966	21 January 1973	7 years, 20 days		
Judge of Appeal	Kenneth Asprey	1 January 1966	6 July 1975	9 years, 186 days		
Judge of Appeal	Anthony Mason	1 May 1969	6 August 1972	3 years, 97 days	Appointed to the High Court, subsequently appointed Chief Justice of Australia	
Judge of Appeal	Sir James Manning	7 October 1969	28 February 1973	3 years, 144 days		
Judge of Appeal	Athol Moffitt	22 January 1970	25 June 1984	14 years, 155 days		
Judge of Appeal	Sir Laurence Street	31 July 1972	1 November 1988	16 years, 93 days		
Judge of Appeal	Martin Hardie	31 July 1972	29 June 1974	1 year, 333 days		
Judge of Appeal	Robert Hope	7 August 1972	23 July 1989	16 years, 350 days		
Judge of Appeal	Raymond Reynolds	1 October 1972	18 February 1983	10 years, 140 days		
Judge of Appeal	Francis Hutley	9 February 1973	22 October 1984	11 years, 256 days		
Judge of Appeal	Sir Nigel Bowen	24 July 1973	19 December 1976	3 years, 148 days	Chief Justice of the Federal Court (1976–1990)	
Judge of Appeal	Harold Glass	14 March 1974	3 July 1987	13 years, 111 days		
Judge of Appeal	Gordon Samuels	12 August 1974	23 March 1992	17 years, 224 days		
Judge of Appeal	Dennis Mahoney	1 November 1974	3 February 1997	22 years, 94 days		
Judge of Appeal	Bill Priestley	3 June 1983	31 December 2001	18 years, 211 days		
Judge of Appeal	Michael McHugh	31 October 1984	13 February 1989	4 years, 105 days	Appointed to the High Court	
Judge of Appeal	John Clarke	20 July 1987	14 February 1997	9 years, 209 days		
Judge of Appeal	Roddy Meagher	31 January 1989	16 March 2004	15 years, 45 days		
Judge of Appeal	Kenneth Handley	30 January 1990	11 January 2007	16 years, 346 days		
Judge of Appeal	Simon Sheller	18 November 1991	2 May 2005	13 years, 165 days		
Judge of Appeal	Jerrold Cripps	2 April 1992	5 October 1993	1 year, 186 days	Independent Commission Against Corruption Commissioner (2004–2009)	
Judge of Appeal	Phillip Powell	6 October 1993	8 November 2002	9 years, 33 days		
Judge of Appeal	Terence Cole	22 August 1994	18 May 1998	3 years, 269 days		
Judge of Appeal	Margaret Beazley	29 April 1996	28 February 2019	22 years, 305 days	Acting Judge of the District Court of NSW (1990–1991); Assistant Commissioner Independent Commission Against Corruption (1991–1992); Judge of the Federal Court (1993–1996); President of the Court of Appeal (2013–2019); Appointed Governor of NSW	
Judge of Appeal	Paul Stein	8 April 1997	11 April 2003	6 years, 3 days		
Judge of Appeal	Roger Giles	11 June 1998	23 December 2011	13 years, 195 days		
Judge of Appeal	Gerald Fitzgerald	18 February 1999	16 April 2001	2 years, 57 days		
Judge of Appeal	Dyson Heydon	14 February 2000	10 February 2003	2 years, 361 days	Appointed to the High Court	
Judge of Appeal	David Hodgson	23 April 2001	9 August 2011	1 year, 364 days		
Judge of Appeal	Murray Tobias	28 April 2003	25 March 2011	7 years, 331 days		
Judge of Appeal	Ruth McColl	29 April 2003	27 January 2019	15 years, 273 days		
Judge of Appeal	John Bryson	17 March 2004	28 February 2007	2 years, 348 days		
Judge of Appeal	John Basten	2 May 2005	15 April 2022	16 years, 348 days		
Judge of Appeal	Joseph Campbell	29 January 2007	19 December 2012	5 years, 325 days		
Judge of Appeal	Virginia Bell	29 January 2008	19 December 2008	325 days	Appointed to the High Court	
Judge of Appeal	Robert Macfarlan (Note: Bruce MacFarlan is the father of Robert MacFarlan)	8 September 2008	22 February 2023	14 years, 167 days		
Judge of Appeal	Peter Young	6 March 2009	23 April 2012	3 years, 48 days		
Judge of Appeal	Anthony Meagher	10 August 2011	1 August 2024	12 years, 357 days		
Judge of Appeal	Reginald Barrett	25 January 2012	20 April 2015	3 years, 85 days		
Judge of Appeal	Clifton Hoeben	23 April 2012	31 August 2021	9 years, 130 days		
Judge of Appeal	Julie Ward	12 November 2012	5 March 2022	9 years, 113 days	Chief Judge in Equity (2017–2022); Appointed President of the Court of Appeal	
Judge of Appeal	Peter McClellan	21 February 2013	8 February 2018	4 years, 352 days	Judge of the District Court of NSW (1998–2005); Chief Royal Commissioner of the child abuse Royal Commission	
Judge of Appeal	Arthur Emmett	7 March 2013	30 September 2015	2 years, 207 days	Judge of the Federal Court (1997–2013)	
Judge of Appeal	Fabian Gleeson	29 April 2013	9 May 2025	12 years, 10 days		
Judge of Appeal	Mark Leeming	3 June 2013		13 years, 166 days		
Judge of Appeal	Carolyn Simpson	11 June 2015	29 March 2018	2 years, 291 days		
Judge of Appeal	Anthony Payne	30 March 2016		10 years, 231 days		
Judge of Appeal	Richard White	15 March 2017	19 December 2024	7 years, 279 days		
Judge of Appeal	Paul Brereton (Note: Russell Brereton is the father of Paul Brereton)	23 August 2018	30 May 2023	4 years, 280 days	Appointed as Commissioner of the National Anti-Corruption Commission	
Judge of Appeal	Lucy McCallum	27 January 2019	7 March 2022	3 years, 39 days	Appointed Chief Justice of the Australian Capital Territory	
Judge of Appeal	Robert Beech-Jones	31 August 2021	19 October 2023	2 years, 49 days	Appointed to the High Court	
Judge of Appeal	Anna Mitchelmore	28 March 2022		4 years, 233 days		
Judge of Appeal	Jeremy Kirk	21 April 2022		4 years, 209 days		
Judge of Appeal	Christine Adamson	3 February 2023		3 years, 286 days		
Judge of Appeal	Kristina Stern	8 June 2023		3 years, 161 days		
Judge of Appeal	Richard McHugh	20 August 2024		2 years, 88 days		
Judge of Appeal	Michael Ball	4 November 2024		2 years, 12 days		
Judge of Appeal	Stephen Free	12 May 2025		1 year, 188 days		
Additional Judge of Appeal	Robert Taylor	18 November 1970; 8 February 1972; 1 February 1975	1 October 1971; 7 August 1972; 19 December 1978	317 days 181 days 3 years, 321 days		
Additional Judge of Appeal	David Selby	20 April 1973	13 March 1976	2 years, 328 days		
Additional Judge of Appeal	John McClemens	20 April 1973	31 January 1975	1 year, 286 days		
Additional Judge of Appeal	Michael Helsham	22 December 1976	1 April 1986	9 years, 100 days		
Additional Judge of Appeal	John O'Brien	13 August 1979	11 February 1986	6 years, 182 days		
Additional Judge of Appeal	Thomas William Waddell	13 March 1996	12 May 1996	60 days		
Additional Judge of Appeal	Alan Abadee	4 October 1996	3 December 1996	60 days		
Acting Judge of Appeal	Athol Moffitt	10 February 1966	10 August 1966	181 days		
Acting Judge of Appeal	Robert Hope	14 August 1989	14 October 1992	3 years		
Acting Judge of Appeal	Gordon Samuels	23 March 1992	7 April 1993	1 year		
Acting Judge of Appeal	John Brownie	20 February 1997; 3 May 1999	30 June 1997; 2 May 2005	130 days 5 year		
Acting Judge of Appeal	John Clarke	27 March 1997; 5 June 2000	26 March 1998; 30 June 2000	1 years 25 days		
Acting Judge of Appeal	Ken Carruthers	2 March 1998	3 July 1998	123 days		
Acting Judge of Appeal	Gerald Fitzgerald	1 July 1998	30 June 1999	1 year		
Acting Judge of Appeal	Michael Foster	31 May 1999	26 November 2003	4 years	Judge of the Federal Court (1987–1998)	
Acting Judge of Appeal	Terence Cole	31 May 1999	1 August 1999	62 days		
Acting Judge of Appeal	Jane Mathews	8 February 2001	7 February 2005	3 years		
Acting Judge of Appeal	James Rolfe	30 April 2001; 24 September 2001	29 June 2001; 30 November 2001	60 days 67 days		
Acting Judge of Appeal	Gerald Fitzgerald	4 June 2001; 3 September 2001	29 June 2001; 30 November 2001	25 days 88 days		
Acting Judge of Appeal	Michael Campbell	3 June 2002; 5 February 2004	28 June 2002; 4 February 2005	25 days 365 days		
Acting Judge of Appeal	Jerrold Cripps	24 January 2003	23 January 2005	2 years	Independent Commission Against Corruption (2004–2009)	
Acting Judge of Appeal	Jeffrey Miles	28 April 2003	27 April 2005	2 years	Formerly Chief Justice of the Supreme Court of the ACT	
Acting Judge of Appeal	Paul Stein	2 February 2004	1 February 2006	2 years	Judge of the District Court of NSW (1983–1985); Judge of the Land and Environment Court (1985–1997)	
Acting Judge of Appeal	Ronald Sackville	1 September 2008	13 July 2019	10 years	Judge of the Federal Court (1994–2008)	
Acting Judge of Appeal	Roderick Howie	6 September 2010	31 December 2010	116 days		
Acting Judge of Appeal	Peter Young	1 May 2012	31 December 2012	244 days		
Acting Judge of Appeal	Arthur Emmett	30 September 2015	2021	6 years		
Acting Judge of Appeal	Reginald Barrett	16 March 2016	30 June 2020	4 years		
Acting Judge of Appeal	Carolyn Simpson	30 March 2018	12 March 2024	5 years, 348 days		
Acting Judge of Appeal	John Griffiths	10 April 2022		4 years, 220 days		
Acting Judge of Appeal	Derek Price	1 June 2024		2 years, 168 days		
Chief Judge at Common Law	John McClemens	20 April 1973	31 January 1975	1 year, 286 days		
Chief Judge at Common Law	Robert Taylor	1 January 1975	19 December 1978	3 years, 352 days		
Chief Judge at Common Law	Colin Begg	28 September 1983	9 September 1984	347 days		
Chief Judge at Common Law	Jack Lee	4 August 1988	8 October 1991	3 years, 65 days		
Chief Judge at Common Law	David Hunt	28 November 1991	31 March 1998	6 years, 123 days	Subsequently appointed Australia's Judge on UN International Criminal Tribunal for Former Yugoslavia	
Chief Judge at Common Law	James Wood	1 April 1998	31 August 2005	7 years, 152 days		
Chief Judge at Common Law	Peter McClellan	2 September 2005	21 February 2013	7 years, 172 days		
Chief Judge at Common Law	Clifton Hoeben	22 February 2013	31 August 2021	9 years, 130 days		
Chief Judge at Common Law	Robert Beech-Jones	31 August 2021	19 October 2023	5 years, 77 days	Appointed to the High Court	
Chief Judge at Common Law	Ian Harrison	9 November 2023		3 years, 7 days		
Chief Judge in Equity	Sir John Harvey	10 February 1925	31 January 1935	9 years, 355 days		
Chief Judge in Equity	Harold Sprent Nicholas	17 November 1939	7 January 1948	8 years, 51 days		
Chief Judge in Equity	Charles McLelland	8 September 1958	30 September 1972	14 years, 22 days		
Chief Judge in Equity	Michael Helsham	22 December 1976	1 April 1986	9 years, 100 days		
Chief Judge in Equity	Thomas William Waddell	2 April 1986	16 April 1993	7 years, 14 days		
Chief Judge in Equity	Malcolm McLelland	17 April 1993	29 August 1997	4 years, 134 days		
Chief Judge in Equity	David Hodgson	30 August 1997	22 April 2001	3 years, 235 days		
Chief Judge in Equity	Peter Young	23 April 2001	5 March 2009	7 years, 316 days		
Chief Judge in Equity	Patricia Bergin	6 March 2009	14 March 2017	8 years, 8 days		
Chief Judge in Equity	Julie Ward	15 March 2017	5 March 2022	4 years, 355 days	Appointed President of the Court of Appeal	
Chief Judge in Equity	David Hammerschlag	17 March 2022		4 years, 244 days		
Chief Judge, Commercial Division	Andrew Rogers	21 December 1987	3 May 1993	5 years, 133 days		
Chief Judge, Commercial Division	Barry O'Keefe	19 May 1993	13 November 1994	1 year, 178 days	Independent Commission Against Corruption Commissioner (1994–1999); Judicial Appointment revived (without loss of seniority) 14 November 1999	
Chief Judge, Commercial Division	Roger Giles	8 December 1994	11 June 1998	3 years, 185 days		
Chief Judge, Criminal Division	John O'Brien	13 August 1979	11 February 1986	6 years, 182 days		
Chief Judge, Family Law Division	David Selby	20 April 1973	13 March 1976	2 years, 328 days		
Judge	John Stephen	5 March 1826	31 December 1832	6 years, 301 days	Appointed by Legislative Council 17 August 1825	
Judge	Sir James Dowling	6 August 1827	27 September 1844	17 years, 52 days		
Judge	William Burton	22 December 1832	6 July 1844	11 years, 197 days	Appointed a judge in Madras	
Judge	John Willis	7 November 1837	8 February 1841	3 years, 93 days		
Judge	Sir Alfred Stephen	27 March 1841	5 November 1873	34 years, 205 days		
Judge	Sir John Dickinson	2 October 1844	17 February 1861	16 years, 138 days		
Judge	Roger Therry	18 February 1846	31 January 1859	12 years, 347 days		
Judge	William à Beckett	1 October 1846	23 January 1852	5 years, 114 days		
Judge	Samuel Milford	1 April 1857	26 May 1865	8 years, 55 days		
Judge	Edward Wise	15 February 1860	28 September 1865	5 years, 217 days		
Judge	Alfred Cheeke	12 June 1865	14 March 1876	10 years, 276 days	Judge of the District Court of NSW (1859–1865)	
Judge	John Hargrave	23 June 1865	11 October 1881	16 years, 110 days	Judge of the District Court of NSW (1858–1859)	
Judge	Peter Faucett	4 October 1865	8 February 1888	22 years, 125 days		
Judge	Sir William Manning	28 April 1876	17 October 1887	11 years, 172 days		
Judge	Sir William Charles Windeyer (Note: The Windeyer family is a prominent legal dynasty in Australia.)	9 August 1881	31 August 1896	15 years, 22 days		
Judge	Sir Joseph Innes (Note: Sir Joseph Innes was the father of Regniald Long Innes)	14 October 1881	28 October 1896	15 years, 14 days		
Judge	Henry Stephen	19 May 1887	25 February 1904	16 years, 282 days		
Judge	Sir William Owen (Note: Sir William Owen was the father of Sir Langer Owen and the grandfather of Sir William FL Owen.)	18 October 1887	1 February 1908	20 years, 106 days		
Judge	George Deffell	3 January 1888	9 November 1889	1 year, 310 days		
Judge	William Foster	14 February 1888	18 December 1894	6 years, 307 days		
Judge	Charles James Manning	13 November 1889	8 August 1898	8 years, 268 days		
Judge	Sir George Simpson	18 December 1894	11 April 1910	15 years, 114 days		
Judge	Henry Cohen	10 September 1896	5 January 1912	15 years, 117 days	Judge of the District Court of NSW (1881–1882)	
Judge	Archibald Simpson	21 November 1896	31 December 1917	21 years, 40 days		
Judge	Gregory Walker	23 August 1898	31 December 1906	8 years, 130 days		
Judge	Robert Pring	16 June 1902	31 July 1922	20 years, 45 days		
Judge	Sir Philip Street	1 February 1907	31 January 1934	26 years, 364 days		
Judge	Richard Sly	11 February 1908	16 December 1920	12 years, 309 days		
Judge	Sir Alexander Gordon	27 April 1910	22 January 1929	18 years, 270 days		
Judge	Sir David Ferguson	5 March 1912	6 October 1932	20 years, 215 days		
Judge	George Rich	2 July 1912	4 April 1913	276 days	Appointed to the High Court	
Judge	Sir John Harvey	15 April 1913	31 January 1936	22 years, 291 days		
Judge	Sir Charles Wade	15 March 1920	26 September 1922	2 years, 195 days	Acting Judge of the District Court of NSW; Attorney General (1904–1910); Premier (1907–1910)	
Judge	Augustus James	6 January 1921	27 February 1934	13 years, 52 days		
Judge	James Lang Campbell	1 September 1922	22 November 1929	7 years, 82 days		
Judge	Sir Langer Owen	30 October 1922	27 August 1933	10 years, 301 days		
Judge	Reginald Long Innes	10 February 1925	16 November 1940	15 years, 280 days		
Judge	Sir Colin Davidson	14 February 1927	17 November 1949	22 years, 276 days		
Judge	Sir Percival Halse-Rogers	7 June 1928	7 October 1945	17 years, 122 days		
Judge	Edward Milner Stephen	10 June 1929	28 April 1939	9 years, 322 days		
Judge	Sir Kenneth Street	7 October 1931	27 January 1960	28 years, 112 days		
Judge	Victor Maxwell (Note: Victor Maxwell (1887-1975) was the father of Victor Maxwell (1922-1997).)	9 August 1932	31 August 1956	24 years, 22 days	Acting Judge of the District Court of NSW (1928); Acting Judge of the Supreme Court (1929–1930 & 1934)	
Judge	Francis Stewart Boyce	28 August 1932	27 June 1940	7 years, 304 days	Acting Judge of the District Court of NSW (1916–1917)	
Judge	Harold Sprent Nicholas	1 February 1935	7 January 1948	12 years, 340 days		
Judge	Sir Thomas Bavin	16 October 1935	31 August 1941	5 years, 319 days		
Judge	Ernest David Roper	25 May 1937 (Note: Roper was appointed as a Judge of the Land and Valuation Court on 25 May 1937. Every six months from 1937 to 1939, he received an additional commission as an acting judge of the Supreme Court. In 1940 his appointment as a Supreme Court judge was backdated to 25 May 1937.)	28 June 1958	21 years, 34 days		
Judge	Sir William FL Owen	25 October 1937	21 September 1961	23 years, 331 days	Appointed to the High Court	
Judge	Sir Dudley Williams	17 June 1940	14 October 1940	119 days	Appointed to the High Court	
Judge	Reginald Schofield Bonney	1 August 1940	26 September 1950	10 years, 56 days		
Judge	Henry George Edwards	28 November 1940	2 July 1952	11 years, 217 days		
Judge	Sir Leslie Herron	10 February 1941	22 May 1972	31 years, 102 days	Judge of the District Court of NSW (1939–1941)	
Judge	John Clancy	9 July 1947	29 May 1965	17 years, 324 days		
Judge	Sir Bernard Sugerman	10 September 1947	30 September 1972	25 years, 20 days		
Judge	Francis Dwyer	5 April 1948	16 November 1953	5 years, 225 days		
Judge	Ted Kinsella	18 January 1950	9 June 1963	13 years, 142 days	Judge of the District Court of NSW 1943; Member of the Industrial Commission of NSW (1943–1950)	
Judge	Stanley Toose (Note: Stanley Toose is the father of Paul Toose)	13 November 1950	5 April 1954	3 years, 143 days		
Judge	John McClemens	3 September 1951	7 March 1975	23 years, 185 days		
Judge	Charles McLelland	28 April 1952	28 April 1973	21 years, 0 days		
Judge	Alan Taylor	5 May 1952	2 September 1952	120 days	Appointed to the High Court	
Judge	Athol Richardson	5 May 1952	16 October 1967	15 years, 164 days		
Judge	Russell Brereton	13 October 1952	7 May 1974	21 years, 206 days	Judge of the District Court of NSW (1951–1952)	
Judge	Bill Dovey	30 March 1953	9 April 1964	11 years, 10 days		
Judge	Hugh Maguire	25 September 1953	31 October 1973	20 years, 36 days	Acting Judge of the District Court of NSW (1947); Acting Judge of the Supreme Court (1953)	
Judge	Frederick Myers	9 October 1953	26 July 1971	17 years, 290 days		
Judge	Cyril Walsh	8 February 1954	2 October 1969	15 years, 236 days	Appointed to the High Court	
Judge	John Nield	8 February 1954	29 April 1962	8 years, 80 days	Judge of the District Court of NSW (1934–1954)	
Judge	Keith Ferguson	6 May 1955	5 June 1965	10 years, 30 days		
Judge	Martin Hardie	2 September 1955	29 June 1974	18 years, 300 days		
Judge	Sir James Manning	5 December 1955	28 February 1973	17 years, 85 days		
Judge	Wilfred Collins	5 December 1955	27 February 1979	23 years, 84 days		
Judge	Rex Chambers	3 April 1958	31 December 1963	5 years, 272 days		
Judge	Rae Else-Mitchell	8 September 1958	1 October 1974	16 years, 23 days		
Judge	Bruce MacFarlan	28 July 1959	31 October 1974	15 years, 95 days		
Judge	Sir Kenneth Jacobs	21 March 1960	7 February 1974	13 years, 323 days	Appointed to the High Court	
Judge	Sir Gordon Wallace	21 March 1960	21 January 1970	9 years, 306 days		
Judge	John Nagle	21 March 1960	10 July 1983	23 years, 111 days		
Judge	Robert Taylor	10 October 1961	19 December 1978	17 years, 70 days		
Judge	David Selby	29 June 1962	13 March 1976	13 years, 258 days		
Judge	Athol Moffitt	9 November 1962	25 June 1984	21 years, 229 days		
Judge	Kenneth Asprey	25 June 1963	6 July 1975	12 years, 11 days		
Judge	Colin Begg	3 April 1964	9 September 1984	20 years, 159 days		
Judge	Philip Allen	4 August 1964	2 February 1978	13 years, 182 days		
Judge	John O'Brien	31 August 1964	11 February 1986	21 years, 164 days		
Judge	Simon Isaacs	19 October 1964	9 April 1975	10 years, 172 days		
Judge	John Holmes	8 November 1965	21 January 1973	7 years, 74 days		
Judge	Sir Laurence Street	29 November 1965	1 November 1988	22 years, 338 days		
Judge	Norman Jenkyn	29 November 1965	29 November 1975	10 years, 0 days		
Judge	Jack Lee	12 September 1966	8 October 1991	25 years, 26 days		
Judge	Raymond Reynolds	17 October 1967	18 February 1983	15 years, 124 days		
Judge	Michael Helsham	19 August 1968	1 April 1986	17 years, 225 days		
Judge	Leycester Meares	2 June 1969	4 February 1979	9 years, 247 days		
Judge	Paul Toose	2 June 1969	30 April 1981	11 years, 332 days		
Judge	Robert Hope	22 September 1969	23 July 1989	19 years, 304 days		
Judge	Gordon Carmichael	7 October 1969	19 March 1981	11 years, 163 days		
Judge	John Slattery (Note: John Slattery is the father of Michael Slattery)	22 January 1970	3 August 1988	18 years, 194 days		
Judge	Antony Larkins	18 October 1971	29 July 1983	11 years, 284 days		
Judge	Philip Woodward	19 October 1971	2 February 1982	10 years, 106 days		
Judge	Kevin Holland	23 August 1972	1 March 1985	12 years, 190 days		
Judge	Dennis Mahoney	8 August 1972	3 February 1997	24 years, 179 days		
Judge	Francis Hutley	9 October 1972	22 October 1984	12 years, 13 days		
Judge	Gordon Samuels	20 November 1972	23 March 1992	19 years, 124 days		
Judge	Ian Sheppard	6 February 1973	8 December 1979	6 years, 305 days	Judge of the Federal Court (1979–1987)	
Judge	Hal Wootten	17 September 1973	7 October 1983	10 years, 20 days		
Judge	Harold Glass	17 September 1973	3 July 1987	13 years, 289 days		
Judge	Arthur Francis Rath	18 February 1974	20 June 1984	10 years, 123 days		
Judge	Victor Maxwell	8 April 1974	1 August 1990	16 years, 115 days		
Judge	Thomas William Waddell	25 July 1974	16 April 1993	18 years, 265 days		
Judge	Philip Jeffrey	26 August 1974	24 December 1978	4 years, 120 days		
Judge	David Yeldham	21 October 1974	28 January 1990	15 years, 99 days		
Judge	George Needham	4 November 1974	6 April 1989	14 years, 153 days		
Judge	William Ash	20 February 1975	1 October 1982	7 years, 223 days		
Judge	Henry Cantor	6 June 1975	2 June 1986	10 years, 361 days		
Judge	Sir William Deane	1 February 1977	31 March 1977	58 days	Judge of the Federal Court (1977–1982); Subsequently appointed to the High Court	
Judge	Phillip Powell	26 April 1977	8 November 2002	25 years, 196 days		
Judge	Edwin Lusher	29 September 1977	16 June 1986	8 years, 260 days		
Judge	John Kearney	1 May 1978	21 February 1992	13 years, 296 days		
Judge	Adrian Roden	4 December 1978	31 March 1989	10 years, 117 days	Judge of the District Court of NSW (1977–1978)	
Judge	David Hunt	5 March 1979	31 March 1998	19 years, 26 days	Subsequently appointed Australia's Judge on UN International; Criminal Tribunal for Former Yugoslavia	
Judge	Bill Fisher	30 July 1979	17 November 1981	2 years, 110 days	President Industrial Commission of NSW (1981–1998); Acting Judge of the District Court of NSW 1998-2002	
Judge	Malcolm McLelland	30 July 1979	29 August 1997	18 years, 30 days		
Judge	Andrew Rogers	14 December 1979	3 May 1993	13 years, 140 days		
Judge	Donald Stewart	24 June 1981	31 December 1984	3 years, 190 days	Judge of the District Court of NSW (1977–1981)	
Judge	Michael Foster	13 July 1981	1 November 1987	6 years, 111 days	Judge of the Federal Court (1987–1998)	
Judge	Thomas Reynolds	13 July 1981	11 April 1988	6 years, 273 days		
Judge	Kep Enderby	22 February 1982	26 June 1992	10 years, 125 days		
Judge	Jeffrey Miles	8 March 1982	16 June 1985	3 years, 100 days	Chief Justice of the Supreme Court of the ACT	
Judge	John Clarke	1 February 1983	14 February 1997	14 years, 13 days		
Judge	David Hodgson	31 October 1983	9 August 2011	27 years, 282 days		
Judge	John Brian	21 November 1983	28 February 1999	15 years, 99 days		
Judge	Ken Carruthers	28 November 1983	17 February 1995	11 years, 81 days		
Judge	James Wood	1 February 1984	31 August 2005	21 years, 211 days		
Judge	Mervyn Finlay	13 August 1984	8 September 1995	11 years, 26 days		
Judge	Rex Smart	29 October 1984	13 November 1998	14 years, 15 days		
Judge	Michael Grove	11 February 1985	11 October 2010	25 years, 242 days		
Judge	Peter Young	4 March 1985	23 April 2012	27 years, 50 days		
Judge	Peter McInerney	8 July 1985	12 March 1999	13 years, 247 days		
Judge	Michael Campbell	3 March 1986	6 February 1994	7 years, 340 days	Chief Judge, Compensation Court of NSW (1994–2004)	
Judge	John Bryson	12 May 1986	28 February 2007	20 years, 292 days		
Judge	John Brownie	16 June 1986	25 October 1996	10 years, 131 days		
Judge	Colin Allen	1 August 1986	4 August 1996	10 years, 3 days		
Judge	Jane Mathews	7 July 1987	3 July 1994	6 years, 361 days	President Administrative Appeals Tribunal	
Judge	Peter Newman	2 November 1987	5 November 2000	13 years, 3 days		
Judge	Ray Loveday	29 April 1988	9 June 1993	5 years, 41 days		
Judge	Roger Giles	6 May 1988	23 December 2011	23 years, 231 days		
Judge	Terence Cole	5 May 1988	18 May 1998	10 years, 13 days		
Judge	Tim Studdert	19 September 1988	15 July 2007	18 years, 299 days		
Judge	Brian Sully	24 July 1989	19 March 2007	17 years, 238 days		
Judge	Jeremy Badgery-Parker	25 July 1989	20 March 1998	8 years, 238 days		
Judge	George Sharpe	26 July 1989	9 August 1993	4 years, 14 days		
Judge	Alan Abadee	27 August 1990	3 October 2000	10 years, 37 days		
Judge	James Rolfe	24 September 1990	16 March 2001	10 years, 173 days		
Judge	Bruce James	18 May 1991	9 December 2011	20 years, 205 days		
Judge	William Victor Windeyer	14 April 1992	28 November 2008	16 years, 228 days		
Judge	Morris Ireland	18 May 1992	13 June 2000	8 years, 26 days		
Judge	David Levine	10 August 1992	31 March 2005	12 years, 233 days		
Judge	John Dunford	2 February 1993	1 May 2005	12 years, 88 days		
Judge	Robert Shallcross Hulme	14 May 1993	6 June 2012	19 years, 23 days		
Judge	Barry O'Keefe	19 May 1993	22 March 2004	10 years, 308 days	Independent Commission Against Corruption Commissioner (1994–1999); Judicial Appointment revived (without loss of seniority) 14 November 1999	
Judge	Kim Santow	30 August 1993	31 December 2007	14 years, 123 days		
Judge	Carolyn Simpson	22 December 1993	29 March 2018	24 years, 97 days		
Judge	Reg Blanch	28 February 1994	13 December 1994	288 days	Chief Judge of the District Court of NSW (1994–2014)	
Judge	Robert Hunter	29 April 1994	21 July 2002	8 years, 83 days		
Judge	Vince Bruce	4 July 1994	8 March 1999	4 years, 247 days		
Judge	John Dowd	25 July 1994	23 August 2004	10 years, 29 days		
Judge	Theodore Simos	31 January 1995	16 October 2001	6 years, 258 days		
Judge	Russell Bainton	20 February 1995	28 August 1998	3 years, 189 days		
Judge	Harold Sperling	27 February 1995	27 February 2005	10 years, 0 days		
Judge	Peter Hidden	16 October 1995	17 March 2016	20 years, 153 days		
Judge	Graham Barr	26 August 1996	21 March 2009	30 years, 82 days		
Judge	John Hamilton	17 March 1997	31 March 2009	12 years, 14 days		
Judge	Clifford Einstein	1 September 1997	3 May 2012	14 years, 245 days		
Judge	Greg James	14 April 1998	1 May 2005	7 years, 17 days	Acting Judge of the District Court of NSW (1988–1990)	
Judge	Michael Adams	28 July 1998	10 February 2017	18 years, 197 days	Chief Commissioner of the Law Enforcement Conduct Commission	
Judge	David Kirby	12 August 1998	14 October 2011	13 years, 63 days	Judge of the District Court of NSW (1988–1989)	
Judge	Robert Austin	31 August 1998	5 March 2010	11 years, 186 days		
Judge	Michael Walton	8 December 2016		27 years, 333 days	Judge, Vice President & President of the Industrial Court of NSW (18 December 1998 - 7 December 2016)	
Judge	Patricia Bergin	1 March 1999	14 March 2017	18 years, 13 days		
Judge	Virginia Bell	25 March 1999	19 December 2008	9 years, 269 days	Appointed to the High Court	
Judge	Anthony Whealy	26 June 2000	29 June 2012	12 years, 3 days		
Judge	Roderick Howie	11 October 2000	14 May 2010	9 years, 215 days		
Judge	Peter McClellan	29 January 2001	25 August 2003	2 years, 208 days	Chief Judge, Land and Environment Court (25 August 2003 – 1 September 2005)	
Judge	Reginald Barrett	19 March 2001	20 April 2015	14 years, 32 days		
Judge	George Palmer	23 April 2001	3 June 2011	10 years, 41 days		
Judge	Joseph Campbell	26 October 2001	19 December 2012	11 years, 54 days		
Judge	Terrence Buddin	30 January 2002	16 March 2012	10 years, 46 days		
Judge	Ian Gzell	4 February 2002	27 May 2013	11 years, 112 days		
Judge	David Ipp	21 October 2002	13 November 2009	7 years, 23 days	Independent Commission Against Corruption Commissioner (2009–2014)	
Judge	Jeff Shaw	4 February 2003	12 November 2004	1 year, 282 days		
Judge	William Nicholas	5 February 2003	1 July 2013	10 years, 146 days		
Judge	Robert McDougall	21 August 2003	31 January 2019	15 years, 163 days		
Judge	David Hislop	23 March 2004	26 March 2014	10 years, 3 days		
Judge	Richard White	27 April 2004	19 December 2024	20 years, 236 days		
Judge	Clifton Hoeben	16 August 2004	31 August 2021	17 years, 15 days		
Judge	Peter Johnson	1 February 2005	24 June 2022	17 years, 143 days		
Judge	Peter Hall	8 March 2005	21 December 2016	11 years, 288 days	Chief Commissioner of Independent Commission Against Corruption (2017–2022)	
Judge	Megan Latham	12 April 2005	27 July 2018	13 years, 106 days	Judge of the District Court of NSW (1998–2005); Commissioner of Independent Commission Against Corruption (2014–2016)	
Judge	Stephen Rothman	3 May 2005		21 years, 197 days		
Judge	Paul Brereton	15 August 2005	30 May 2023	17 years, 288 days	Appointed as Commissioner of the National Anti-Corruption Commission	
Judge	Derek Price	28 August 2006	26 April 2024	17 years, 242 days	Chief Magistrate Local Court (2002–2014); Chief Judge of the District Court of NSW (2014-2024)	
Judge	David Hammerschlag	30 January 2007		19 years, 290 days	Appointed Chief Judge in Equity (2022-)	
Judge	Ian Harrison	12 February 2007		19 years, 277 days	Appointed Chief Judge at Common Law (2023-)	
Judge	Elizabeth Fullerton	19 February 2007	11 November 2022	15 years, 265 days		
Judge	Lucy McCallum	30 January 2008	7 March 2022	14 years, 36 days	Appointed Chief Justice of the Australian Capital Territory	
Judge	Nigel Rein	5 May 2008	18 March 2022	13 years, 317 days	Judge of the District Court of NSW (2002–2008)	
Judge	Julie Ward	29 September 2008		18 years, 48 days		
Judge	Robert Allan Hulme	2 March 2009	16 September 2022	13 years, 198 days		
Judge	Robert Forster	4 May 2009	26 March 2010	326 days		
Judge	Michael Slattery	25 May 2009		17 years, 175 days		
Judge	David Davies	29 June 2009	11 July 2025	16 years, 12 days		
Judge	Monika Schmidt	27 July 2009	11 September 2019	10 years, 46 days	Judge of the Industrial Court of NSW (1993–2009)	
Judge	Michael Pembroke	12 April 2010	12 April 2020	10 years, 0 days		
Judge	Michael Ball	13 April 2010		16 years, 217 days		
Judge	Peter Garling	7 June 2010		16 years, 162 days		
Judge	John Sackar	1 February 2011	16 February 2024	13 years, 15 days		
Judge	Ashley Black	4 July 2011		15 years, 135 days		
Judge	Christine Adamson	17 October 2011		15 years, 30 days		
Judge	Geoffrey Bellew	31 January 2012	10 February 2023	Appointed [Chairman of the New South Wales Parole Board]		14 years, 289 days
Judge	James Stevenson	1 February 2012	17 July 2025	13 years, 166 days		
Judge	Robert Beech-Jones	12 March 2012	19 October 2023	14 years, 249 days	Appointed to the High Court	
Judge	Stephen Campbell	2 May 2012		14 years, 198 days		
Judge	Richard Button	12 June 2012	24 August 2024	12 years, 73 days		
Judge	Geoff Lindsay	6 August 2012		14 years, 102 days		
Judge	Philip Hallen	12 November 2012	30 June 2023	10 years, 230 days		
Judge	Francois Kunc	8 April 2013		13 years, 222 days		
Judge	Stephen Robb	20 June 2013	2 February 2024	10 years, 227 days		
Judge	Rowan Darke	16 August 2013	16 August 2023	10 years, 0 days		
Judge	Robertson Wright	25 October 2013		13 years, 22 days		
Judge	Peter Hamill	29 April 2014		12 years, 201 days		
Judge	Helen Wilson	3 November 2014	7 February 2025	10 years, 96 days	Judge of the District Court of NSW (2014-2014)	
Judge	Des Fagan	11 June 2015		11 years, 158 days		
Judge	Natalie Adams	5 April 2016		10 years, 225 days		
Judge	Julia Lonergan	21 March 2017		9 years, 240 days		
Judge	Guy Parker	6 April 2017		9 years, 224 days		
Judge	Kelly Rees	5 September 2018		8 years, 72 days		
Judge	Lea Armstrong	31 October 2018		8 years, 16 days	NSW Crown Solicitor (2015–2018); President of the NSW Civil and Administrative Tribunal (2018–)	
Judge	Trish Henry	30 January 2019	9 February 2024	5 years, 10 days		
Judge	Mark Ierace	31 January 2019		7 years, 289 days		
Judge	Richard Cavanagh	16 September 2019		7 years, 61 days		
Judge	Kate Williams	15 April 2020		6 years, 215 days		
Judge	Hament Dhanji	20 September 2021		5 years, 57 days		
Judge	Elisabeth Peden	6 April 2022		4 years, 224 days		
Judge	Mark Richmond	19 April 2022		4 years, 211 days		
Judge	Michael Meek	5 May 2022		4 years, 195 days		
Judge	Dina Yehia	4 July 2022		4 years, 135 days	Judge of the District Court of NSW (2014–2022)	
Judge	Nicholas Chen	11 July 2022		4 years, 128 days		
Judge	Sarah McNaughton	11 October 2022		4 years, 36 days	Commonwealth Director of Public Prosecutions (2016–2022)	
Judge	Richard Howard Weinstein	1 February 2023		3 years, 288 days	Judge of the District Court of NSW (2019–2023)	
Judge	Deborah Anne Sweeney	8 February 2023		3 years, 281 days	Judge of the District Court of NSW (2006–2023)	
Judge	Scott Nixon	8 February 2023		3 years, 100 days		
Judge	Anthony McGrath	15 February 2023		3 years, 93 days		
Judge	Sarah Huggett	29 November 2023	16 April 2024	2 years, 352 days	Appointed Chief Judge of the District Court (2024-)	
Judge	Ian Pike	30 January 2024		2 years, 290 days		
Judge	James Hmelnitsky	1 February 2024		2 years, 288 days		
Judge	Tim Faulkner	23 May 2024		2 years, 177 days		
Judge	Belinda Rigg	24 July 2024		2 years, 115 days		
Judge	Andrew Coleman	1 October 2024		2 years, 46 days		
Judge	Peter Brereton	6 February 2025		1 year, 283 days		
Judge	Hayley Bennett	1 July 2025		1 year, 138 days		
Judge	Paul McGuire	8 July 2025		1 year, 131 days		
Judge	Edward Muston	2 December 2025		349 days		
Judge	James Emmett	4 December 2025		347 days		
Additional Judge	Samuel Milford	1 January 1856	31 March 1857	1 year, 89 days		
Acting Judge	John Kinchela	April 1836	September 1837	1 year		
Acting Judge	Sir Alfred Stephen	30 April 1839	26 March 1841	1–2 years		
Acting Judge	Henry Stephen	1 October 1876	31 October 1886	9–10 years		
Acting Judge	James Sheen Dowling	1 April 1878	31 December 1881	2–3 years	Judge of the District Court of NSW (1858–1889)	
Acting Judge	Arthur Holroyd	2 April 1879	5 April 1879	3 days		
Acting Judge	William Charles Windeyer	August 1879	9 August 1881	2 years, 0 days	Appointed judge	
Acting Judge	George Deffell	12 August 1887	28 December 1887	138 days		
Acting Judge	Alfred Backhouse	1895	1898	2–3 years	Judge of the District Court of NSW (1884–1921)	
Acting Judge	Richard Sly	30 May 1898	31 December 1907	9 years		
Acting Judge	George Rich	7 June 1911	2 July 1912	1 year		
Acting Judge	Alexander Gerard Ralston	23 September 1919; 18 October 1922; 1 March 1923; 28 July 1924; 1 June 1925	31 December 1919; 31 December 1922; 12 April 1924; 14 February 1925; 31 December 1925	99 days 74 days 1 year 201 days 213 days	Acting Judge of the District Court of NSW (1894, 1905, 1907 1920)	
Acting Judge	Augustus James	21 September 1920	5 January 1921	106 days		
Acting Judge	Sir David Maughan	28 July 1924; 6 May 1936	27 January 1925; 31 March 1937	183 days 329 days		
Acting Judge	Sir Colin Davidson	8 June 1926	12 February 1927	249 days		
Acting Judge	Victor Maxwell	10 June 1929; 9 February 1934	30 March 1930; 8 August 1934	293 days 180 days	Acting Judge of the District Court of NSW (1928); Judge of the Supreme Court (1934–1956)	
Acting Judge	John Hammond	11 June 1929	31 December 1929	203 days		
Acting Judge	Francis Stewart Boyce	17 June 1932	27 August 1932	71 days		
Acting Judge	Richard Windeyer	23 November 1936	15 February 1937	112 days		
Acting Judge	Ernest David Roper	8 March 1937	24 May 1937	77 days		
Acting Judge	Henry George Edwards	18 November 1937	5 September 1938	308 days		
Acting Judge	Charles Hardwick	9 January 1939	31 May 1939	142 days		
Acting Judge	Arthur Pitt	14 February 1939	31 May 1939	106 days		
Acting Judge	Edmund Alfred Barton (Note: Edmund Alfred Barton was the son of High Court judge Sir Edmund Barton.)	1 June 1939	30 April 1940	334 days	Judge of the District Court of NSW (1933–1949)	
Acting Judge	Sir Dudley Williams	17 November 1939	16 June 1940	212 days		
Acting Judge	Keith Ferguson	17 March 1941	30 April 1941	44 days	Acting Judge of the District Court of NSW 1933; Judge of the Supreme Court (1955–1965)	
Acting Judge	Stanley Toose	5 January 1949	12 November 1950	1 years		
Acting Judge	John Nield	7 January 1952	25 January 1952	18 days	Judge of the District Court of NSW (1934–1954)	
Acting Judge	Gerald O'Sullivan	7 January 1952; 12 January 1953	25 January 1952; 1 February 1953	18 days 20 days	Judge of the District Court of NSW (1950–1960)	
Acting Judge	John Brennan	12 January 1953	8 February 1953	27 days	Judge of the District Court of NSW (1951–1977)	
Acting Judge	Frank Stephen	12 January 1953; 11 June 1956	8 February 1953; 26 October 1956	27 days 137 days	Judge of the District Court of NSW (1952–1967)	
Acting Judge	Hugh Maguire	30 March 1953	24 September 1953	178 days	Acting Judge of the District Court of NSW (1947); Judge of the Supreme Court (1953–1973)	
Acting Judge	Frederick Myers	9 April 1953	8 October 1953	182 days		
Acting Judge	Wilfred Collins	13 September 1955	4 December 1955	82 days		
Acting Judge	Sir Kenneth Jacobs	1 July 1959	31 December 1959	183 days	Appointed to the High Court	
Acting Judge	Kenneth Asprey	24 October 1962	24 June 1963	243 days		
Acting Judge	Hereward Henchman (Note: Hereward John Humfry Henchman was the son of Hereward Humfry Henchman a judge of the Supreme Court of Queensland)	12 September 1966	28 February 1967	169 days	Judge of the District Court of NSW (1968–1974)	
Acting Judge	Michael Helsham	3 June 1968	18 August 1968	76 days		
Acting Judge	Ken Carruthers	10 October 1983	16 December 1983	67 days		
Acting Judge	John Slattery	12 September 1988	3 December 1992	4 years		
Acting Judge	James Rolfe	31 January 1989	28 April 1989	87 days		
Acting Judge	Peter Capelin	27 February 1989; 26 February 1990	12 May 1989; 4 May 1990	74 days 67 days		
Acting Judge	Calvin Callaway	27 February 1989; 26 February 1990; 29 September 1997	12 May 1989; 4 May 1990; 19 December 1997	74 days 67 days 81 days	Associate Judge of the District Court of NSW (1988–1990)	
Acting Judge	George Needham	7 April 1989	6 April 1991	2 years		
Acting Judge	Kevin Holland	13 June 1989	31 August 1990	10 years		
Acting Judge	Morris Ireland	14 August 1989	13 October 1989	60 days		
Acting Judge	Alan Abadee	2 April 1990	1 June 1990	60 days		
Acting Judge	Vince Bruce	4 June 1990; 1 July 1991	3 August 1990; 30 August 1991	60 days 60 days		
Acting Judge	Jack Lee	8 October 1991	4 December 1992	1 year		
Acting Judge	Ray Loveday	25 October 1993; 12 September 1994	31 January 1994; 31 December 1994	98 days 110 days		
Acting Judge	George Sharpe	1 August 1994	31 December 1994	152 days		
Acting Judge	John Hamilton	29 July 1996	1 November 1996	95 days		
Acting Judge	Rex Smart	4 March 1999	3 March 2005	6 years		
Acting Judge	Ken Carruthers	10 May 1999	9 May 2004	5 years		
Acting Judge	Peter McInerney	24 May 1999	23 May 2001	2 years		
Acting Judge	Jeremy Badgery-Parker	1 July 1999	30 June 2002	3 years		
Acting Judge	Morris Ireland	14 June 2000	13 June 2003	3 years		
Acting Judge	David Ipp	29 January 2001	1 January 2003	1–2 years		
Acting Judge	Peter Newman	8 February 2001	7 February 2005	3 years		
Acting Judge	Jerrold Cripps	24 January 2002	23 January 2003	1 year	Independent Commission Against Corruption Commissioner (2004–2009)	
Acting Judge	Reg Blanch	3 June 2002	28 June 2002	25 days	Chief Judge of the District Court of NSW (1994–2014)	
Acting Judge	Jane Mathews	8 February 2001	18 December 2017	16 years	Judge of the District Court of NSW (1980–1987)	
Acting Judge	William Victor Windeyer	17 August 2009	30 November 2012	3 years		
Acting Judge	Peter Hidden	20 July 2016	2021	5 years		
Acting Judge	Monika Schmidt	3 February 2020		6 years		
Acting Judge	Michael Elkaim	30 January 2023		3 years	Former ACT Supreme Court Judge (2016-2022)	
Acting Judge	Robert Hulme	5 June 2024		2 years		
Judge at Port Phillip (Note: A resident judge was appointed for the Port Phillip District between 1840 and 1852 when the district became the colony of Victoria.)	John Willis	8 February 1841	24 June 1843 (Note: Willis was notified on 24 June 1843 that he had been amoved by Governor Gipps, however the Privy Council subsequently held that while there were sufficient grounds for his removal, he should have been given an opportunity to be heard. His appointment was revoked by the Queen in August 1846.)	2 years, 136 days		
Judge at Port Phillip	William Jeffcott	1 July 1843	December 1844	1 year, 153 days		
Judge at Port Phillip	Roger Therry	9 January 1845	17 February 1846	1 year, 39 days		
Judge at Port Phillip	William à Beckett	28 February 1846	23 January 1852	5 years, 329 days	Became first Chief Justice of Victoria 24 January 1852	
Judge at Moreton Bay (Note: A resident judge was appointed for the Moreton Bay District from 1852, until the district became the colony of Queensland)	Samuel Milford	21 January 1856	14 February 1859	3 years, 24 days		
Judge at Moreton Bay	Alfred Lutwyche	15 February 1859	7 August 1861	2 years, 173 days	Appointed first judge of the Supreme Court of Queensland	
Master in Equity	William Carter	1 December 1823; 1829; 22 November 1841	1828; 1832; 1843	4–5 years 2–3 years 1–2 years		
Master in Equity	John Kinchela	30 November 1840	September 1841	275–304 days		
Master in Equity	Samuel Milford	24 January 1843	31 December 1855	12 years, 341 days		
Master in Equity	George Deffell	1 April 1857	10 May 1866	9 years, 39 days		
Master in Equity	Arthur Holroyd	11 May 1866	19 January 1885	18 years, 253 days		
Master in Equity	Henry F Barton	20 January 1885	25 October 1902	18 years, 278 days		
Master in Equity	Henry P Owen	4 November 1902	31 July 1918	15 years, 269 days		
Master in Equity	William Parker	1 August 1918	25 July 1940	21 years, 359 days		
Master in Equity	John Hooton	26 July 1940	1959	18–19 years		
Master in Equity	Edward Dawes	1959	1976	16–17 years		
Master in Equity	Brian Cohen	1976	1983	6–7 years		
Master in Equity	Denis Gressier	1983	1991	7–8 years		
Master in Equity	William Victor Windeyer	1989	April 1992	2–3 years		
Master in Lunacy	Arthur Holroyd	16 May 1879	19 January 1885	5 years, 248 days		
Master in Lunacy	Henry F Barton	20 January 1885	25 October 1902	18 years, 278 days		
Master in Lunacy	Henry P Owen	4 November 1902	31 July 1918	15 years, 269 days		
Master	Henry Cantor	1 July 1972	5 June 1975	2 years, 339 days		
Master, Common Law	George Sharpe	1975	1989	13–14 years		
Master, Common Law	Colin Allen	1976	July 1986	9–10 years		
Master, Common Law	John Hogan	1982	1989	6–7 years		
Master, Common Law	Terence Greenwood	1982	1997	14–15 years		
Master, Common Law	James Monaghan	6 August 1986	2 December 1988	2 years, 118 days		
Master, Common Law / Associate Judge	Bryan Malpass	1989	30 October 2008	18–19 years		
Master / Associate Judge	Joanne Harrison	1997		28–29 years		
Master in Equity / Associate Judge	John McLaughlin	1989	4 July 2010	20–21 years		
Master in Equity / Associate Judge	Richard Macready	1992	27 February 2013	20–21 years		
Associate Judge	Philip Hallen	5 July 2010	11 November 2012	2 years, 129 days		
Acting Master in Equity	Frederick Salisbury	8 June 1897	31 December 1897	206 days		
Acting Master in Equity	Harry Henry	1 November 1928; 22 May 1933	31 January 1929; February 1934	91 days 255–282 days		
Acting Master in Equity	Geofrey Stuckey	4 December 1937	31 January 1938	58 days		
Deputy Master in Equity	Frederick Salisbury	3 April 1905	31 May 1905	58 days		
