= Leslie Herron =

Former Chief Justice of New South Wales (1902–1973)

The Honourable Sir Leslie Herron KBE, CMG, KStJ

12th Chief Justice of New South Wales
- In office 25 October 1962 – 22 May 1972
- Appointed by: Elizabeth II
- Preceded by: Herbert Evatt
- Succeeded by: Sir John Kerr

Lieutenant-Governor of New South Wales
- In office 22 April 1972 – 3 May 1973
- Preceded by: Sir Kenneth Street
- Succeeded by: Sir Laurence Street

Personal details
- Born: 22 May 1902 Sydney
- Died: 3 May 1973 (aged 70) Sydney

Sir Leslie James Herron KBE, CMG, KStJ (22 May 1902 – 3 May 1973) was a prominent Australian barrister, judge, Chief Justice and Lieutenant-Governor of New South Wales. Biographer Martha Rutledge describes him as being "interested, interesting and with a lively sense of humour", but that he "conducted his court with consideration, dignity and mercy". The ferry The Lady Herron was named after his wife.

== Early years ==
Herron was born on 22 May 1902 in the Sydney suburb of Mosman, to Henry Herron and Emily Ethel (née Downie). Leslie was the second of six siblings. He was educated at the Mosman Church of England Preparatory School, at Sydney Grammar School and at the University of Sydney. He obtained an LL.B in 1924 with second class honours. Herron played first-grade rugby union in the position of "breakaway" for the Sydney club Western Suburbs Football Club between 1922 and 1925.

Herron was admitted to the New South Wales bar on 28 August 1925 and practiced in common law on the "Northern Circuit" of New South Wales. He married Andree Lorna on 6 January 1930 at St James' Anglican Church in the centre of Sydney on 6 January 1930. He took silk as a King's Counsel (KC) on 20 December 1939.

== Judicial career ==
Herron was appointed as an acting judge of the District Court of New South Wales in February 1939. The District Court is a middle-ranking court in New South Wales. On 10 February 1941, Herron was appointed as a judge of the Supreme Court of New South Wales, the state's highest court.

Herron served as a royal commissioner in the 1958 Royal Commission of Inquiry into statements made by the Auditor-General in his annual report for the year 30 June 1958 concerning the Minister for Housing, the Honourable Abram Landa. In 1961, Herron became the chairman of the Law Reform Committee.

From March 1962, Herron served as Acting Chief Justice due to the illness of the then chief justice Herbert (Doc) Evatt. On Evatt's resignation, Herron was permanently appointed as Chief Justice on 25 October 1962. Herron was to serve as Chief Justice during a time of structural change in the Supreme Court. In 1965, the New South Wales Government established the Court of Appeal to replace the Full Court of the Supreme Court, the first court of its kind in Australia. The establishment became controversial because the government however appointed a junior judge of the court, Justice Wallace (appointed 1960) to be the first President of the Court of Appeal, rather than the Senior Puisne judge Bernard Sugerman (appointed 1947). The appointment of Wallace made him the second most senior judge of the Supreme Court after the Chief Justice. This was resented by some of the other judges of the court and led to a schism in the bench, which was not fixed until Wallace retired and was replaced by Sugerman. It led to certain judges refusing to sit with other judges which created its own tensions.

== Notable cases ==
One of the legally significant cases Herron was involved with was R v Cuthbert. This case laid out the rationale upon which a society inflicts punishment upon offenders when they contravene the law and commit a criminal offence. Herron said:

The function of the criminal law and the purposes of punishment cannot be found in any single explanation, for it depends both upon the nature and type of offence and the offender. But all purposes may be reduced under the single heading of the protection of society, the protection of the community from crime. The sentence should be such as, having regard to all proved circumstances, seems at the same time to accord with the general moral sense of the community and to be likely to be a sufficient deterrent both to the prisoner and others. Courts have not infrequently attempted further analysis of the several aspects of punishment, where retribution, deterrence and reformation are said to be its threefold purposes. In reality they are but the means employed by the Court for the attainment of the single purpose of the protection of society.

Herron also presided in the trial of notorious Sydney identity Darcy Dugan. Dugan and an accomplice, William Cecil Mears, were convicted by Herron for a bungled hold-up of the Commonwealth Bank at the Sydney suburb of Ultimo. Mears shot the bank manager Leslie Nalder, and both Dugan and Mears were charged with wounding with intent to murder. Herron sentenced both to death, but both sentences were commuted. Eventually Dugan and Mears were paroled.

Herron was involved in hearing the criminal charges against Charles Ivan le Gallien. Le Gallien was sentenced to life imprisonment for murder. Herron received a death threat as a result of this trial, and was given police protection as a result.

In 1966, Herron sentenced Peter Kocan to life imprisonment for the attempted assassination of Arthur Calwell, the incumbent federal opposition leader.

== Civic activities ==
Intensively involved with civic and sporting activities, Herron served as the president of the Australian Golf Club between 1944 and 1973. He was the president of the New South Wales Rugby Union between 1943 and 1956. He was elected as the first chairman of the Australian Rugby Football Union was that body was first started on 25 November 1949. He subsequently in 1957 was chairman of the International Rugby Football Board which is based in London. He was president of the New South Wales Amateur Swimming Association between 1949 and 1964. He was chairman of the Sydney Cricket Ground Trust between 1970 and 1972. Herron was the founding vice-president of Australian Neurological Foundation (now called the Brain Foundation) established in 1970. Herron was involved with fundraising for St Vincent's Hospital at Sydney, the Mater Misericordiae hospital in North Sydney, the National Heart Foundation, the Freedom from Hunger Campaign, the Central Methodist Mission, the Salvation Army and the Bush Children's Hostels Foundation of New South Wales. He was president of the New South Wales branch of the St John Ambulance Association. He was also a member of the New South Wales Olympic Council.

== Honours ==
Herron was appointed a Knight of the Order of St John (KStJ) in 1964 for his work in the St John Ambulance. For his service as Chief Justice of New South Wales he was appointed a Companion of the Order of St Michael and St George (CMG) in 1964, and a Knight Commander of the Order of the British Empire (KBE) in 1966 .

Herron was named 'Father of the Year' by the Australian Father's Day Council in 1963. In 1972 he received the second honorary Doctor of Law (LL.D) awarded by the University of New South Wales. New South Wales Rugby Union established the Sir Leslie Herron Scholarship in 2004 to support young players in the competition.

== Later years ==
Upon reaching the mandatory retirement age for judges in 1972, Herron remarked that he had reached 'the age of statutory senility' as he was no longer considered competent to work as a judge. Herron worked on a legal aid scheme and was the Administrator of the New South Wales government in the absence of the governor Sir Roden Cutler on an official visit to the United Kingdom between 11 April 1973 and until the date of his death on 3 May 1973 in St Vincent's Hospital, Darlinghurst.

Legal offices
Preceded by Herbert Evatt	Chief Justice of New South Wales; 1962–1972	Succeeded by Sir John Kerr
Government offices
Preceded by Sir Kenneth Street	Lieutenant-Governor of New South Wales; 1972–1973	Succeeded by Sir Laurence Street
