= Elizabeth Fullerton =

Australian judge

The Honourable Justice Elizabeth Fullerton

Judge of the Supreme Court of NSW
- Incumbent
- Assumed office 19 February 2007

Personal details
- Born: Elizabeth Lillian Fullerton; 27 December 1953 (age 72) Melbourne, Victoria, Australia
- Education: Coburg Teachers College; Monash University; University of New South Wales
- Occupation: Judge, lawyer

Elizabeth Lillian Fullerton (born 27 December 1953) is an Australian lawyer, specialising in criminal law, who has been a judge of the Supreme Court of New South Wales since February 2007.

== Early life and education ==
Fullerton studied to become a primary and infants teacher at Coburg Teachers College, before working as a teacher in 1975 and 1976. In 1977, Fullerton traveled to Israel to live and work in a kibbutz. Fullerton commenced studying Arts and Law at Monash University in 1978 before transferring to the University of NSW where she graduated in June 1983.

On 30 May 2019, Fullerton was awarded the honorary degree Doctor of Laws (honoris causa) by Monash University.

== Career ==
Fullerton was admitted as a barrister in December 1983, with Carolyn Simpson as her tutor. Fullerton occupied the Women's room in Frederick Jordan Chambers, a room established to encourage female barristers in their first year. Janet Coombs was one of the trustees and at the time the rent was subsidised. In 1985 and 1986 Fullerton was part of the legal team, led by Ian Barker QC that appeared for the Northern Territory at the Royal Commission into the Conviction of Lindy Chamberlain. In 1988 Fullerton was appointed to the Commonwealth Director of Public Prosecutions as one of the first in house counsel, before returning to the private bar the following year. Fullerton was appointed a senior counsel in 1999.

Fullerton appeared in major criminal trials, being the prosecutor in the trial of five men who were convicted of the importation of a massive quantity of heroin, some 339 kg with an estimated value of $620 million. As well as prosecuting, Fullerton also represented defendants, appearing in the sentencing of members of the Ronen family who had been convicted of tax fraud. Fullerton was one of the barristers who appeared for Rodney Adler in relation to the collapse of HIH Insurance. and appeared for Tony Oates, the former financial executive who was involved in the fraudulent transfer of money from Bell Resources to Bond Corporation. Fullerton was counsel assisting the coronial inquest into the death of T.J. Hickey.

=== Supreme Court of NSW ===
Since her appointment to the Supreme Court in 2007 Fullerton has been the trial judge in numerous high-profile criminal trials. Some of the more notable trials include charges against Nine Network reporter Ben Fordham and producer Andrew Byrne for breach of the NSW Listening Devices Act. In 2013 Philip Nguyen pleaded guilty to the manslaughter of police Constable William Crews. Justice Fullerton sentenced Nguyen imprisonment for 9 years and 6 months, with a non-parole period of 7 years. The NSW Court of Criminal Appeal upheld a crown appeal that the sentence was manifestly inadequate, almost doubling the prison sentence.

In 2014 Fullerton was the judge in the trial of Paul Mulvihill, who a jury convicted of the stabbing murder of his former lover Rachelle Yeo and Fullerton sentenced him to a maximum 29 years in prison. Fullerton was the judge in the trial of Adeel Khan, who was convicted of the murder of Chris Noble and the manslaughter of Bianka O'Brien and her baby son Jude following a fire in Khan's shop at Rozelle. Khan was sentenced to a maximum term of imprisonment of 40 years. Fullerton was the judge in the third trial of Robert Xie, who had been charged with the murder of 5 members of the Lin family. The jury was unable to agree on a verdict, and Fullerton was the judge in the fourth trial in which Xie was convicted and sentenced to imprisonment for life.
