= Michael Walton =

Michael Walton may refer to:

- Michael Walton (judge), Australian judge on the Supreme Court of New South Wales
- Michael Walton (American football), special teams coordinator for the Tarleton State Texans football program; see list of current NCAA Division I FCS football coaches
- Michael Walton, a fictional character in the television series Marley's Ghosts
- Mike Walton (born 1945), Canadian ice hockey player
