= Natalie Adams =

Australian judge

The Honourable Justice Natalie Adams

Judge of the Supreme Court of NSW
- Incumbent
- Assumed office 5 April 2016

Personal details
- Born: Natalie Jane Adams; 1965 (age 60–61) Narrandera, New South Wales, Australia
- Education: St Joseph's Convent Primary School; St Francis de Sales Regional College; Kincoppal School; University of Sydney; University of New South Wales
- Profession: Judge, lawyer

Natalie Jane Adams (born 1965) is an Australian judge. She has been a judge of the Supreme Court of New South Wales since 2016.

Adams was born in Narrandera, and was educated at St Joseph's Convent Primary School, St Francis de Sales Regional College at Leeton and Kincoppal-Rose Bay, Sydney. She subsequently studied law and economics at the University of Sydney, where she was a resident at Sancta Sophia College graduating with honours in law in 1989, and was admitted as a solicitor in June 1989. She later completed a Master of Laws from the University of New South Wales in 1994, specialising in criminal law.

Adams first began practising in commercial law at Freehill Hollingdale & Page. In 1990, she shifted to criminal law and joined the Office of the Director of Public Prosecutions (ODPP). Adams worked in their Court of Criminal Appeal Unit from 1991 to 1993, and later as a professional assistant to the Director of Public Prosecutions, where she wrote legal advice for the Director. Adams left the ODPP in 1996 and worked at the Legal Aid Commission as duty solicitor at their Hurstville office and then in the indictable section of their Parramatta office. In 1997, she began working at the Crown Solicitor's Office, where one of her cases saw her assisting the coroner in the inquest into the murder of state MP John Newman.

Adams was admitted as a barrister in 2001, and in 2002 was appointed a Crown Prosecutor. In one prominent case, Adams was the lead prosecutor in the trial of several bikie gang members over a fatal brawl involving Comanchero Motorcycle Club figures at Sydney Airport. She was appointed as the state's Crown Advocate on 28 November 2011, and gained senior counsel status in 2012.

Adams was appointed to the Supreme Court by Attorney-General Gabrielle Upton taking effect on 5 April 2016, filling the vacancy left by the retirement of Justice Peter Hidden. She was one of the judges who dismissed former MP Eddie Obeid's appeal against his conviction and sentence.
