= Peter McInerney =

Supreme Court judge of New South Wales, Australia (1927–2014)

Honourable Peter McInerney QC

Puisne Judge of the Supreme Court of New South Wales
- In office 8 July 1985 – 12 March 1999

Personal details
- Born: Peter Aloysius McInerney; 9 April 1927
- Died: 1 August 2014 (aged 87)
- Citizenship: Australian
- Spouse: Jeanette Hardie
- Education: University of Sydney
- Profession: Barrister; Judge

Peter Aloysius McInerney QC (1927–2014) was an Australian barrister and New South Wales Supreme Court judge.

== Biography ==
McInerney was born in Goulburn, New South Wales, the only child of grazier Leslie McInerney and his wife, Florence (née Smith). Forebears had farmed in the Southern Tablelands for more than 150 years, and Peter grew up on the family property, Moonyah, near Collector.

His initial education was by correspondence, then at the tiny Breadalbane Primary School. He completed his Leaving Certificate in 1945 at St. Joseph's College in Hunters Hill, where he led the senior debating team. He matriculated to receive a double degree in Arts and Law from the University of Sydney.

== Career ==
=== Legal career ===
After graduation, McInerney commenced as an associate to New South Wales Supreme Court judges John Clancy and Cyril Walsh. He was admitted to the New South Wales Bar in 1955 and practised from Selborne Chambers focussing on common and criminal law. He represented many clients in the Newcastle and Broken Hill regions in industrial injury matters and appeared in a number of cases for battered women accused of murdering their husbands. He was a brilliant trial advocate, always meticulously prepared.

He was appointed a Queen's Counsel (QC) in 1974 and appeared for prisoners in the Nagle Royal Commission (1976–78) into the Bathurst prison riots.

=== Judicial career ===
He was appointed a judge of the Supreme Court of New South Wales in 1985. He presided over many high-profile trials including that of Gregory Allen Brown the Downunder Hostel arsonist.

In 1997, the long convicted sadistic murderer Kevin Crump successfully applied to the Supreme Court of NSW to convert his life sentence into a minimum term and an additional term. McInerney heard the appeal and maintained the severity of the initial term, sentencing Crump to a minimum term of 30 years and an additional term for the remainder of his life In February 2016, the NSW Court of Criminal Appeal dismissed Crump's application for leave to appeal McInerney's 1997 sentence determination.

=== Other appointments ===
McInerney was called out of retirement twice to head judicial inquiries into the Glenbrook (1999) and the Waterfall (2003) rail accidents.

== Personal life ==
He married Jeanette Hardie in 1956, and the couple raised five children in Killara, New South Wales. For seventeen years he was president of The Australian Golf Club in Sydney.
