= Reginald Long Innes =

Reginald Heath Long Innes (17 November 1869 – 26 May 1947) was a lawyer and judge in Sydney, Australia.

== History ==
Innes was born in Double Bay, Sydney to Emily Jane Innes, née Smith, and Joseph George Long Innes. He was educated at Malvern College, Worcestershire, England, where he excelled in games and studies, followed by New College, Oxford. He followed his father in choosing to study law at Lincoln's Inn, and in 1892 won a hundred-guinea exhibition at the Inns of Court and read his articles with W. M. Cann, known for his knowledge of equity law. He was called to the English Bar on 26 January 1893.

He returned to Sydney, where he was admitted to the bar on 21 September 1893, and in July 1895 was appointed clerk associate to Mr Acting-Justice Cohen, then set up in Denman Chambers, Phillip Street, in association with his father, Sir Joseph, and from 1896 with Justice Archibald Henry Simpson (died 2 October 1918). Over time, he built a successful practice and was made King's Counsel in 1916. On 10 February 1925 he was appointed a judge on the Supreme Court of New South Wales and became chief judge in equity in 1935. He enjoyed the work and the dignity of his position, reluctantly accepting retirement in November 1939.

He died aged 77 at the family's holiday home "Woodlands" in Medlow Bath in the Blue Mountains, and his remains cremated.

== Other interests ==
- He enlisted with the Australian Army in 1916, was appointed lieutenant and served in Australia throughout World War I.
- In 1923 he founded the (Sydney) Barristers' Benevolent Association and was its first secretary.
- He was a physical fitness devotee, playing cricket for the I Zingari club, also tennis and golf — he was a foundation member of Royal Sydney Golf Club.
- He volunteered for service in World War II, and in December 1940 was appointed chairman of the No.1 Aliens Tribunal.

== Family ==
Innes married Mary Louise McCartie on 18 December 1905. They had three daughters and one son, George Selwyn Long Innes, who joined the Royal Air Force in WWII, serving in Bomber Command. Sergeant G. S. "Rex" Long-Innes, was lost over Western Europe in March 1942.
