= Genni Batterham =

Australian artist, author, disability rights activist and filmmaker

Genni Batterham OAM
- Born: Genevieve Louise Whitford; 19 January 1955; Paddington, Sydney, New South Wales, Australia
- Died: 3 December 1995 (aged 40)
- Education: Macquarie University
- Awards: Medal of the Order of Australia

Genevieve Louise Batterham OAM (19 January 1955 – 3 December 1995) was an Australian film maker, artist, writer and disability rights activist.

She was born Genevieve Whitford in the Sydney suburb of Paddington. She was educated at the Catholic girls' school Kincoppal School, where fellow students noted her rebellious streak. She went on to study at the art school of Macquarie University but did not complete the degree.

In 1978, she began to notice symptoms of multiple sclerosis, which was diagnosed soon afterwards. This prompted an ultimatum to her partner, Perth camera operator Kim Batterham, to "leave her or marry her", of which he chose the latter, and they married in October 1978.

Multiple sclerosis quickly incapacitated her, and she channelled her anger at the resulting disability into producing a series of films chronicling her condition. The first, Pins and Needles, was directed by Barbara Chobocky and released in 1979, and was translated into five languages. The film won several awards in 1980, including first prize at the New York Rehabilitation Film Festival and second prize at the Montreal Film Festival. Genni and Kim would then collaborate on three further films about the phases of her life: Where's the Give and Take? (1981), Artreach (1982), and Riding the Gale (1987).

In the 1984 Queen's Birthday Honours, Batterham was awarded the Medal of the Order of Australia (OAM) for her "service to people with disabilities".
