= Kincoppal School =

Kincoppal-Rose Bay, School of the Sacred Heart
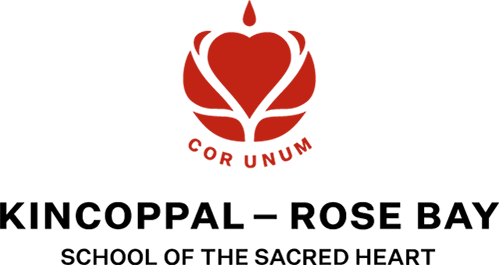

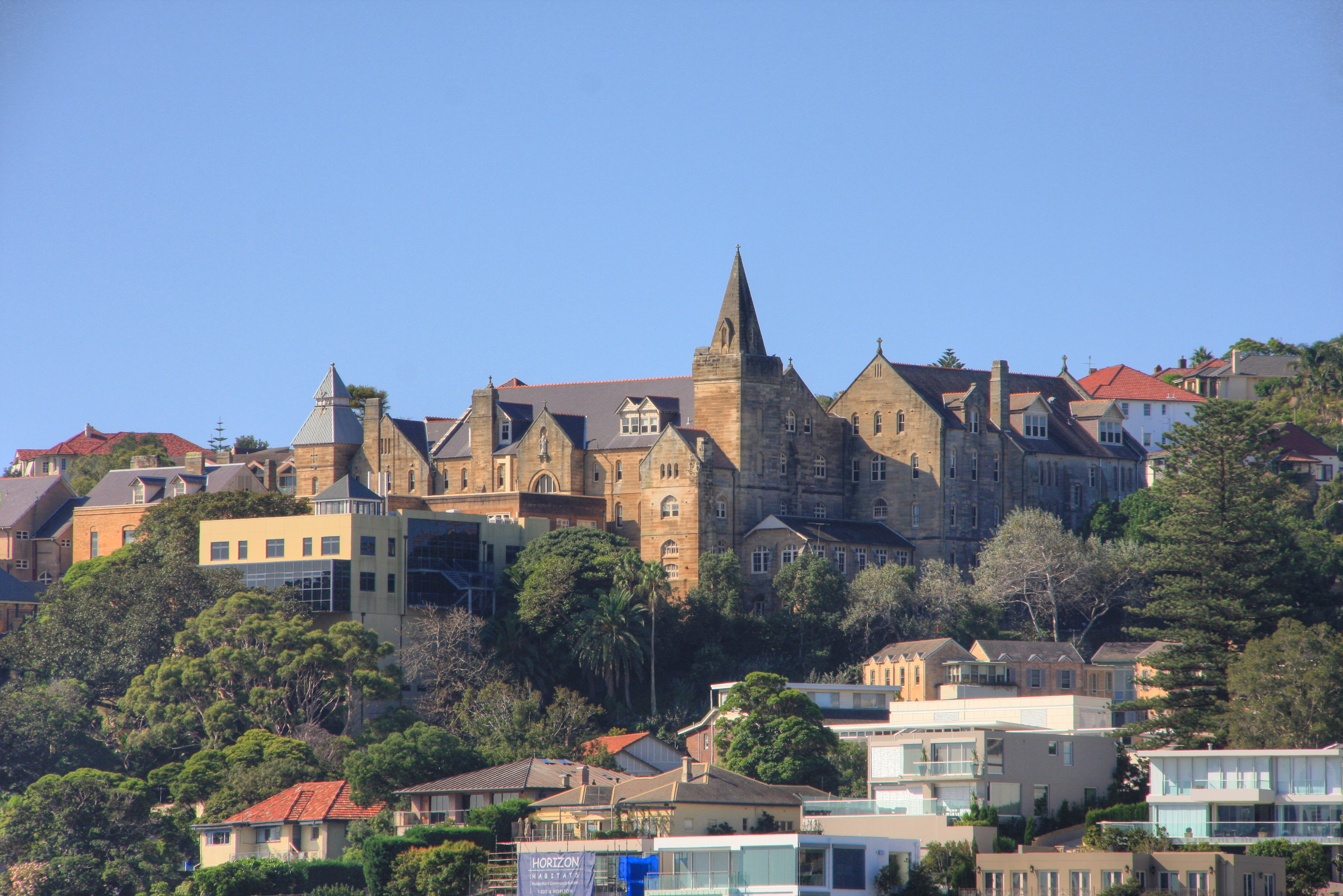
- Rose Bay, Sydney, New South Wales; Australia

Information
- Other names: Kincoppal School; Kincoppal-Rose Bay
- Type: Independent early learning, primary and secondary day and boarding school
- Motto: Latin: Cor Unum (One Heart)
- Religious affiliation: Society of the Sacred Heart
- Denomination: Roman Catholic
- Established: 1882; 144 years ago (as Convent of the Sacred Heart); 1909; 117 years ago (as Kincoppal); 1971; 55 years ago (as Kincoppal-Rose Bay)
- Chairman: Dr Mark Sinclair
- Principal: Erica Thomas
- Staff: ~169
- Years: Early learning and K–12
- Gender: Co-educational (P–6); Girls (7–12)
- Enrolment: c. 971 (P–12)
- Colours: Teal, Red
- Affiliation: Association of Heads of Independent Schools of Australia; Junior School Heads Association of Australia; Australian Boarding Schools' Association; Association of Heads of Independent Girls' Schools
- Website: www.krb.nsw.edu.au

Kincoppal-Rose Bay, School of the Sacred Heart (Kincoppal-Rose Bay), is an independent Roman Catholic early learning, primary and secondary day and boarding school, predominantly for girls, located in Rose Bay, an eastern suburb of Sydney, New South Wales, Australia.

Established in 1971 through the amalgamation of the Convent of the Sacred Heart (established 1882) and Kincoppal (established 1909), today the school is non-selective, with a co-educational primary school and a girls' only secondary school, catering for approximately 1,000 students from Kindergarten to Year 12, including 150 boarders.

Kincoppal-Rose Bay is a member of an international group of schools conducted by the Society of the Sacred Heart, a Catholic teaching order, established by Saint Madeleine Sophie Barat in France in 1800. The school is affiliated with the Association of Heads of Independent Schools of Australia (AHISA), the Junior School Heads Association of Australia (JSHAA), the Australian Boarding Schools' Association (ABSA), and is a member of the Association of Heads of Independent Girls' Schools (AHIGS).

== History ==
Kincoppal-Rose Bay traces its origins to the establishment of two schools. The first, the Convent of the Sacred Heart, Rose Bay, was founded in 1882. The other was founded in 1909 at Kincoppal, the former Elizabeth Bay residence of prominent Catholic businessman John Hughes. The name "Kincoppal" came from a nearby rock in Sydney Harbour that, viewed from a certain position, looks like a horse's head. ("Kincoppal" means "horse's head", the Anglicisation of the Gaeilge (Irish) words "ceann" (head) and "capall" (horse).)

In 1971, the two schools amalgamated at the campus of the Convent of the Sacred Heart, and became known as Kincoppal-Rose Bay, School of the Sacred Heart.

In 1882, five religious from the Society of the Sacred Heart travelled from England on SS Orient to establish a school of the Sacred Heart in Sydney. They selected the residence of Claremont on the Vaucluse peninsula in New South Wales to begin their task of offering students the educational vision of St. Madeleine Sophie Barat, the founder of their Society.

The original building, leased in 1882 and later purchased by the Society of the Sacred Heart, was a private home built in 1851. Margaret MacRory arrived in 1885 and she taught at the school.

The first permanent school building, completed in 1888, was the five-level central facade. The chapel, by the architect John Horbury Hunt, was begun in 1897 and completed in 1900. In 1907 Mother Margaret MacRory became the school's head. She would go on to found a college of the University of Sydney.

Buildings were gradually added to meet the needs of school, community and novitiate. The secondary school was solely a boarding school until the 1960s, when day students were admitted.

The primary day school was located in the main school building until 1951, when an adjoining property was purchased. The building was set up as a primary school and named "Barat-Burn". That building was demolished in 1966 and replaced with the present Junior school.

In 1982, the school celebrated the centenary of its foundation and the arrival of the first religious in Australia. To commemorate the occasion, Sister Leila Barlow wrote and published Living Stones, a book reviewing the spirit, tradition and events of the school's first hundred years.

Today, Kincoppal-Rose Bay comprises a fully co-educational P-6 Junior School for day students, and a Senior School for girls in years 7 to 12, with both day and boarding students attending from metropolitan, rural and international destinations.

== Principals ==
Ordinal	Officeholder	Term start	Term end	Time in office	Notes
1	Anne McGrath	1975	1990	14–15 years	
2	Christopher Faisandier	1991	2005	13–14 years	
3	Hilary Johnston-Croke	2006	2017	10–11 years	
4	Maureen Ryan	2018	2022	5 years	
5	Erica Thomas	2023	Incumbent		

== Campus ==
Kincoppal-Rose Bay is situated on a single campus in suburban Rose Bay, overlooking Sydney Harbour. The school features a mix of 19th century and modern buildings, gardens and fields.

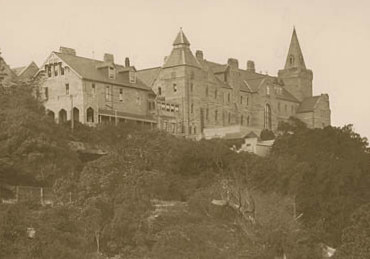
Convent of the Sacred Heart, c. 1930s

As of 2007 facilities of the school included:

- Boarding school Accommodating up to 150 students from Years 7 to 12. Provides dormitory-style accommodation with bed/study cubicles for junior boarders and bed-study rooms which accommodate one or several students for senior boarders. Sheldon House, completed in 1998, provides accommodation for Year 12 students.
- Chapel A central part of the school and regarded as one of the finest works of famous Architect, John Horbury Hunt. Used by students, staff and the School community for Masses, feast days, weddings and special occasions such as the Vale Mass and the Procession of the Lanterns.
- Harbour Terrace Located above the school library, this flat roof area has uninterrupted views down Sydney Harbour. Used by students during lunch and recess breaks, and is also the venue for the Vale (graduation) Luncheon.
- Hughes Centre Used for assemblies, school productions, concerts, examinations and special events. Equipped with an auditorium seating approximately 550 in theatre-style, stage, backstage area, audio/visual system, lighting, heating, grand piano and risers.
- Junior School Learning Centre Incorporating the Junior School Library, an IT Centre and a drop-in independent learning area with access to IT and print resources.
- Mary Agnes O'Neil Library Opened 1998. Features separate floors for fiction and research, computer and printing facilities and two seminar rooms.
- McGuinness Centre A gymnasium with a fully sprung floor.
- Maureen Tudehope Centre A multi-purpose centre comprising an auditorium, stage, basketball court, heated indoor pool, fitness centre, dance studio, pilates studio and change room facilities. Used for sporting and recreational activities, whole school assemblies and other special events.
- Performing Arts Centre Refurbished in 1998. Used by both Junior and Senior students for orchestral and choral rehearsals and performances.
- Fernon Fields A sports field for Junior school students.
- Sheldon Swimming Pool A heated 25-metre indoor pool, situated in the MTC.
- Sports Field Including 5 tennis courts and a large, flat area for competitive track and field events.

== In popular culture ==
Kincoppal-Rose Bay has been used as a set for a number of films including Looking for Alibrandi and Our Lips Are Sealed. The school has also featured in numerous television series', including Spirited and Spyforce.

== Notable alumnae ==
- Natalie Adams, Supreme Court judge
- Genni Batterham, filmmaker and artist
- Patricia Bergin, Supreme Court judge
- Samantha Armytage, journalist and Seven Network news presenter
- Nikki Gemmell, author
- Peggy Kelman OBE, pioneer aviator
- Paulette McDonagh, Phyllis McDonagh and Paulette McDonagh early Australian film makers who were educated as weekly boarders at the Convent of the Sacred Heart, Elizabeth Bay
- Princess Michael of Kent (born Baroness Marie Christine Anna Agnes Hedwig Ida von Reibnitz), a member of the British royal family and an author
- Helen de Guerry Simpson, Australian novelist (also attended Abbotsleigh)
- Lucy Hughes Turnbull, wife of Prime Minister Malcolm Turnbull; former Lord Mayor of Sydney (2003-2004); company director; writer (also attended Frensham School)
- Gai Waterhouse, horse trainer, businessperson and former actress
- Patricia Horsley, architect and philanthropist
- Holly Harris, Olympic figure skater

== Notable staff ==
- Hamid Reza Mobarrez, swimming coach and Olympian
- Leila Waddell, musician

== See also ==
- List of Catholic schools in New South Wales
- List of boarding schools in Australia
- Network of Sacred Heart Schools
