= David Hodgson (judge) =

Australian judge (1939–2012)

David Hargraves Hodgson AO QC
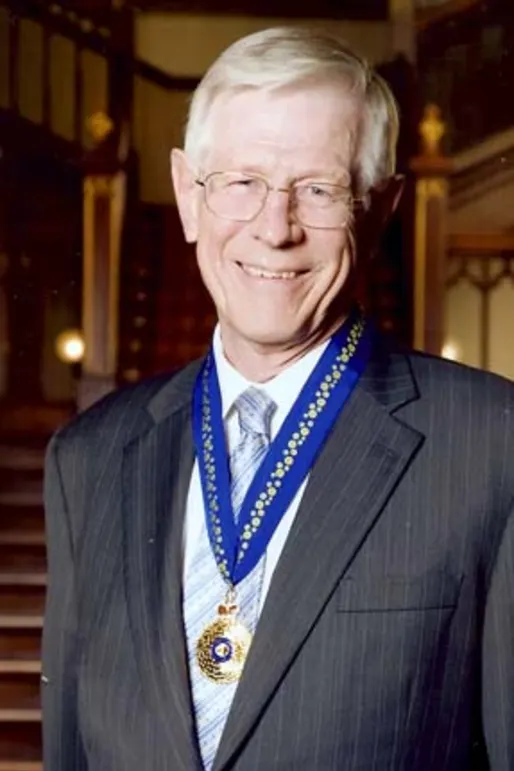

Judge of the Supreme Court of NSW
- In office 31 October 1983 – 9 August 2011

Chief Judge in Equity
- In office 30 August 1997 – 22 April 2001

Judge of Appeal
- In office 23 April 2001 – 9 August 2011

Personal details
- Born: David Hargraves Hodgson; 10 August 1939 Sydney, NSW, Australia
- Died: 5 June 2012 (aged 72)
- Education: Sydney Grammar School; University of Sydney; University of Oxford
- Occupation: Judge, lawyer

David Hargraves Hodgson (10 August 1939 – 5 June 2012) was a judge of the Court of Appeal of the Supreme Court of New South Wales, the highest court in the State of New South Wales, Australia, which forms part of the Australian court hierarchy. He was described by James Allsop, Chief Justice of the Federal Court of Australia, as "one of the finest judges who ever graced a court in this country".

== Education ==
Hodgson was educated at Sydney Grammar School from 1950 to 1956, where he played rugby, served in the cadets, was dux of the school, and topped the state in mathematics I and II.

Hodgson attended the University of Sydney with a university and Commonwealth scholarship. He graduated in 1962 with degrees in Arts and Law with first-class honours, the same year as fellow judges Murray Gleeson and Michael Kirby.

Hodgson then attended the University of Oxford on a Rhodes scholarship, where he completed a Doctor of Philosophy on the topic of utilitarianism which formed the basis of his book, Consequences of Utilitarianism. Hodgson's thesis supervisor, Herbert Hart, described Hodgson as the ablest Doctor of Philosophy student he had ever had.

== Legal career ==
In 1962 Hodgson served as associate to High Court judge Sir Victor Windeyer. He was admitted to the bar in 1965.

Hodgson served as a Commissioner of the New South Wales Law Reform Commission part-time, lectured at the University of Sydney, was Assistant Editor of the Australian Law Journal from 1969 to 1976, and served on the Bar Council from 1978 to 1979. He was appointed Queen's Counsel in 1979.

In 1983 Hodgson was appointed as a Judge of the Supreme Court of New South Wales. He was Chief Judge in Equity from 1997 to 2001, and was appointed to the Court of Appeal in 2001. He retired from the bench in 2011.

== Philosophical work ==
Hodgson wrote numerous philosophical articles, mainly dealing with issues in philosophy of the mind. He wrote primarily on the topics of free will and consciousness. Hodgson authored three books published by Oxford University Press, Consequences of Utilitarianism (1967), The Mind Matters: Consciousness and Choice in a Quantum World (1991) and Rationality + Consciousness = Free Will (2011). The judge also wrote on probability and plausible reasoning.

== Personal ==
Hodgson married in 1964 and had two sons and a daughter. He enjoyed classical music and jazz, and played tennis regularly.

Hodgson died on 5 June 2012.

Legal offices
Preceded by Malcolm McLelland	Chief Judge in Equity; 1997–2001	Succeeded by Peter Young
