= Monika Schmidt =

Australian judge

The Honourable Justice Monika Schmidt AM

Judge of the Industrial Court of NSW
- In office 16 June 1993 – 26 July 2009

Judge of the Supreme Court of NSW
- In office 27 July 2009 – 11 September 2019

Personal details
- Born: 20 August 1956 (age 70) Hohenlimburg, North Rhine-Westphalia, West Germany (now Germany)
- Education: University of Sydney
- Occupation: Judge, Lawyer

Monika Schmidt AM was a judge of the Supreme Court of New South Wales from 2009 until 2019, appointed to the Common Law Division, having previously been a judge of the Industrial Court of New South Wales for 16 years.

== Early life and education ==
Schmidt was educated at the University of Sydney and received her LL.B. in 1979.

== Career ==
Schmidt was a partner at Minter Ellison, a firm of solicitors, specialising in industrial and employment law, including lecturing at the University of Sydney.

=== Industrial Court of NSW ===
Schmidt was appointed as a judge of the Industrial Court of New South Wales in 1993, aged 32. The Industrial Court of NSW had the equivalent status of the Supreme Court of NSW. Schmidt was involved with the Judicial Commission of New South Wales, in 1996 becoming a member of the advisory committee on judicial education and as a member of the Conduct Division dealing with complaints about judicial officers. In 1998 Schmidt was received a dual appointment as a Deputy President of the Australian Industrial Relations Commission. Schmidt joined Justice Leone Glynn in a dissenting judgement on an important question of the jurisdiction of the Court, a dissent that was subsequently approved by the NSW Court of Appeal.

=== Supreme Court of NSW ===
Schmidt was appointed as an acting judge of the Supreme Court of New South Wales, sitting for four months in 2009 before being permanently appointed to the Common Law Division from 27 July 2009.

In 2013, Schmidt delivered a judgment in the NSW Court of Criminal Appeal which was scathing of the remarks on sentence by District Court judge Garry Neilson, who had found that the seriousness of an incest offence was reduced "because there had been no ejaculation involved ... and because there was no rough handling involved", describing the remarks as having no foundation and not the subject of any evidence, one of a number of judgments that resulted in the suspension of Judge Neilson from criminal trials.

In 2014, Schmidt rejected an application that she refer a case to a male judge, because, as a female judge, she was suspected of being a feminist with leftist leanings. Schmidt noted that a judge was obligated under their oath of office obliged to determine issues impartially regardless of their personal views.

Schmidt retired on 11 September 2019.
