= Patricia Bergin =

Australian judge

The Honourable Patricia Bergin AO, SC

Judge of the Supreme Court of NSW
- In office 1 March 1999 – 14 March 2017

Chief Judge in Equity
- In office 6 March 2009 – 14 March 2017

Personal details
- Born: 1949 (age 76–77) Sydney, NSW, Australia
- Education: Sacré Cœur, Kincoppal; Sydney Teachers' College; Macquarie University
- Occupation: Judge, Lawyer, Teacher
- Nickname: Paddy

Patricia Anne Bergin AO, SC is a former judge of the Supreme Court of New South Wales.

== Early life and education ==
Bergin was born in Sydney, NSW, the daughter of Olga and Denis Bergin, and went to school at Sacré Cœur, Kincoppal. Bergin attended Sydney Teachers College, and was appointed as a teacher on probation on 4 February 1969, working as a teacher for five years before studying law at Macquarie University, graduating in 1981. While studying law Bergin was Associate to District Court Judge Peter Ayton Leslie and then Judge Desmond Ward QC and at Pritchards Law Firm.

== Career ==
Bergin worked as a solicitor at Stephen Jaques & Stephen (now King & Wood Mallesons) from 1981 until she became a barrister in 1984, with Tom Bathurst as her tutor. Bergin represented the National Crime Authority during the coronial inquiry into the murder of Colin Winchester. Bergin was also appointed counsel assisting the Wood Royal Commission. Bergin was made a Senior Counsel in 1998.

In 2015 Bergin was appointed an International Judge of the Singapore International Commercial Court.

After retiring from the Supreme Court was appointed to conduct an inquiry into NSW branch of the Returned and Services League of Australia.

From 2019 to 2021 Bergin conducted a high-profile inquiry for the Independent Liquor and Gaming Authority of NSW into the suitability of Crown Resorts to hold the license for a casino at Barangaroo in Sydney, ultimately finding that Crown was not suitable to do so. Her 800-page report sparked Royal Commissions into Crown in Victoria and Western Australia.

=== Supreme Court of NSW ===
Bergin was appointed a judge of the NSW Supreme Court on 1 March 1999. From 2004 Bergin was the list judge for the Commercial List and the Technology and Construction List. Bergin replaced Peter Young as Chief Judge in Equity on 6 March 2009. In 2009 Bergin described Hooters as being "casual beach-theme restaurants", with Justinian questioning whether her Honour had "accurately captured the theme of this charming chain of wholesome eateries".

== Honours ==
In 2013 Macquarie University awarded Bergin an honorary Doctor of Laws for her work as an outstanding legal practitioner and her contribution to the legal fraternity. She was appointed an Officer of the Order of Australia for "distinguished service to the law, and to the judiciary, to legal administration, and as a mentor and advisor" in the 2021 Queen's Birthday Honours.

Legal offices
Preceded by Peter Young	Chief Judge in Equity; 2009–2017	Succeeded by Julie Ward
