= Australian Law Journal =

- Discipline: Law
- Language: English
- Edited by: Justice François Kunc (2016– )

Publication details
- History: 1927–present
- Publisher: Thomson Reuters (Australia)
- Frequency: Monthly

Standard abbreviations
- ISO 4: Aust. Law J.

Indexing
- ISSN: 0004-9611
- LCCN: 33024673
- OCLC no.: 01518834

Links
- Journal homepage

The Australian Law Journal is an Australian peer-reviewed law journal which has been publishing since 1927. Studies have found that it is one of the most cited Australian law journals.

A 2002 study found that while on the Federal Court of Australia and the High Court of Australia judges published academic articles most often in the Australian Law Journal in both decades studied, the 1980s and 1990s.

The first editor "set out to create in the ALJ, a Journal somewhere between the learned reviews and the practical magazines of the English legal profession".

Past editors have included Bernard Sugerman (1927–1946), Rae Else-Mitchell (1946–1958), Russell Walter Fox (1958–1967), Nigel Bowen (1958–1961), Philip Jeffrey (1968–1973), (Note: Philip Jeffrey QC was a Sydney-educated barrister, Teaching Fellow in Law, University of Sydney, and a Judge of the Supreme Court of New South Wales. He died sometime before 1988, but further information is elusive.) Professor J. G. Starke QC (1974–1992), (Note: Joseph Gabriel "Joe" Starke QC (1911–2006) of Griffith, ACT, was in 1980 consultant to the Australian Law Reform Commission on human rights in international law. He was author of An Introduction to International Law (Butterworth, London).) and Peter Young AO (1992–2016). The Assistant Editor and Revenue Editor (1977–87) was the later Chief Justice of Tuvalu, The Hon Charles Sweeney QC.

== Journal rankings ==
The Australian Business Deans Council has given this journal a quality rating of "A". The Australian Research Council has ranked this journal in the "B" tier, although the methodology and utility of such rankings has been challenged by Australian legal scholars and the responsible minister has indicated that this ranking system will be discontinued.
