= Peter Young (judge) =

Australian judge

The Honourable Peter Young AO KC

Judge of the Supreme Court of NSW
- In office 4 March 1985 – 23 April 2012

Chief Judge in Equity
- In office 23 April 2001 – 5 March 2009

Judge of Appeal
- In office 6 March 2009 – 23 April 2012

Personal details
- Born: Peter Wolstenholme Young; 24 April 1940 (age 86) Sydney
- Spouse: Pamela Young
- Children: Marcus, Melinda, James
- Education: Sydney Church of England Grammar
- Alma mater: Sydney Law School, University of Sydney
- Occupation: Retired judge

Peter Wolstenholme Young, AO, KC (born 24 April 1940, in Sydney) is a retired Australian judge who served as a judge on the Supreme Court of New South Wales for 27 years, retiring in 2012.

== Career ==
Born in Sydney, Young was educated at the Sydney Church of England Grammar School before graduating with a Bachelor of Laws from the Sydney Law School at the University of Sydney. Young's family has a strong legal pedigree. His father, James Young, was admitted as a barrister in 1933; Young's grandfather, James Young Snr., was admitted as a barrister in 1903; and Young's great-grandfather, Richard Young, was admitted as a barrister in 1873. In more recent years, Young's eldest son, Marcus, also a barrister, joined the bar in 1993 and was appointed as a Senior Counsel in 2011.

Young was appointed as a puisne judge in 1985 before being appointed as Chief Judge in Equity, serving from 2001 until 2009. He was appointed as a judge of the New South Wales Court of Appeal in 2009 and served until his retirement in 2012. Young was a justice of the Supreme Court of New South Wales, the highest court in the state of New South Wales, which forms part of the Australian court hierarchy.

In 2004, Young was appointed an Officer in the Order of Australia for service to the law and the administration of justice, to legal scholarship, and the community through the Anglican Church of Australia.

He edited the Australian Law Journal for 24 years, retiring in April 2016.

Young is currently the patron of the Sydney Bus Museum.

Legal offices
Preceded by David Hodgson	Chief Judge in Equity; 2001–2009	Succeeded by Patricia Bergin
