= Joseph Campbell (judge) =

Former judge of the New South Wales Court of Appeal

Joseph Charles Campbell KC (born 1949) is a former judge of the Court of Appeal of the Supreme Court of New South Wales, the highest court in the State of New South Wales, Australia, which forms part of the Australian court hierarchy.

== Education ==
Campbell was educated at Tamworth High School. He attended the International Science School at Sydney University in January 1965 . As an undergraduate he studied at the University of Sydney, where he attained honours in Arts and Law. While at university he was a member of St Andrew's College, University of Sydney.

== Career ==
Campbell began his legal career in 1974 at the firm of Allen, Allen & Hemsley. A year later he was admitted to the New South Wales Bar. He was appointed Queen's Counsel in 1988.

On 26 October 2001, Campbell was sworn in as a judge of the Supreme Court of New South Wales. He was appointed to the Court of Appeal of that court in 2007.

From 1983 to 1986, Campbell was the Challis Lecturer in Bankruptcy at the University of Sydney. He was a part-time Lecturer from 1974 to 1978. Since 2007, Campbell has also been a visiting fellow at Wolfson College.

Campbell has served as a Member of the Legal Profession Admission Board since 2008, a member of the Anglo-Australasian Lawyers Association since 2007, Member and Deputy Chair of the Legal Qualifications Sub-Committee since 2006, a member of the International Academy of Estate and Trust Law since 2005, a member and Deputy Chair of the Examinations Sub-Committee from 2002 to 2006, Chairman of the Council of Law Reporting (NSW) in 2001 and a member from 1994 to 2001, and a member of the Professional Conduct Committee of the NSW Bar Association from 1994 to 1996.

He retired from the Supreme Court in December 2012. He was appointed as an adjunct professor at Sydney Law School in January 2013, and became Fellow of the Australian Academy of Law in 2013.
