= Rae Else-Mitchell =

Australian judge

The Honourable Rae Else-Mitchell CMG QC

Judge of the Supreme Court of New South Wales
- In office 8 September 1958 – 1 October 1974

Judge of the Land and Valuation Court of New South Wales
- In office 1 January 1962 – 1 October 1974

Chairman of the Commonwealth Grants Commission
- In office October 1974 – 1 July 1989
- Preceded by: Leslie Melville
- Succeeded by: Dick Rye

Personal details
- Born: 20 September 1914 Sydney, New South Wales, Australia
- Died: 29 June 2006 (aged 91) Canberra, Australian Capital Territory

Rae Else-Mitchell CMG, QC (20 September 1914 – 29 June 2006) was an Australian jurist, royal commissioner, historian and legal scholar. He was an active member and office bearer in a number of community organisations concerned with history, the arts, libraries, medicine, education, financial and public administration, and town planning. His obituary in The Times (London) described him as being "among Australia's cleverest postwar judges and administrators, accomplishing two distinguished careers of almost equal length."

== Early life and education ==
Rae Else-Mitchell was born in Sydney, New South Wales on 20 September 1914, the son of Francis Montague Else-Mitchell and his wife, Pearl Marie née Gregory. His maternal grandfather was noted cricketer, Dave Gregory, whose biography he was later to write for the Australian Dictionary of Biography.

He was educated at Artarmon Public School, New South Wales and Middle Park Central School, Victoria. He completed his secondary schooling at Melbourne High School. He matriculated to the University of Sydney (Bachelor of Laws First Class Honours 1936). In 1936 he shared with John Kerr and J B Robinson the John George Dalley Prize awarded for the most distinguished student graduating in the Faculty of Law.

== Legal career ==
Else-Mitchell was called to the New South Wales Bar on 16 February 1939 and to the Victorian Bar in 1954. In 1941/42 he was the Assistant Honorary Secretary to the Council of the New South Wales Bar Association. He relinquished his practice during World War II to become Secretary of the Commonwealth Rationing Commission from 1943 to 1945. He returned to practice in 1945, specialising in constitutional law, commercial law and equity. He was counsel for the Commonwealth and New South Wales governments in a number of Privy Council appeals from 1950 to 1956. He was editor of the Australian Law Journal from 1946 to 1958 and a lecturer in Constitutional Law at the University of Sydney from 1951 to 1958. He was made a Queen's Counsel in 1955.

Else-Mitchell was appointed a Judge of the New South Wales Supreme Court on 8 September 1958. He served in the Land and Valuation Court from 1962, initially as an additional Judge from 1 January 1962, as a Deputy Judge on six occasions from 15 March 1965 to 16 August 1972, and finally as a Judge of the Court from 31 July 1972. He retired from both Courts on 1 October 1974.

Else-Mitchell was Chairman of the New South Wales Royal Commission of inquiry into rating, valuation and Local Government finance from 28 August 1965 to 2 May 1967 and Chairman of the Commonwealth Commission of inquiry into land tenures from 4 May 1973 to 6 February 1976. On 1 October 1974 he took up the position of Chairman of the Commonwealth Grants Commission and moved to Canberra. He held this position until 30 June 1989. He was also Chairman of the Legal Aid Commission ACT from 1977 to 1980 and the Commonwealth Legal Aid Council from 6 February 1980 to 1984, as well as the Committee of Inquiry into Assets and Public Debt, ACT (1989), the National Local Approvals Committee (1989-1992), and the Casino Surveillance Authority ACT (1990-2000).

The community organisations in which he was involved included the National Trust of Australia, the Royal Australian Historical Society, the Historic Buildings and Sites Committee (NSW), the Federation of Australian Historical Societies, the Captain Cook Bi-centenary Arts and Historical Committee, the Australian Bicentennial Authority, the Arts Council of Australia (NSW Division), the Public Library of NSW, the Library Board of NSW, the Library Council of NSW, the National Library of Australia, the ACT and Canberra Public Library Service, the Archives Authority of NSW, the Medico Legal Society NSW, St Vincent's Hospital Board, the NSW Association for Mental Health, Macquarie University, Canberra College of Advanced Education, the Royal Australian Institute of Public Administration (NSW), the Centre for Research on Federal Financial Relations at the Australian National University, the Australian Institute of Urban Studies, and the Royal Australian Planning Institute.

Else-Mitchell was the author of 'Hire Purchase Law' (1941, 1955, 1961, 1968), and contributor and/or editor to 'Property Legislation and War Damage' (1942), 'Land Tax Law' (1957), 'Essays on the Australian Constitution' (1952, 1961), 'Public Administration in Australia' (1958, 1968, 1973), and 'Canberra; a people's capital?' (1988). He wrote numerous articles on Australian history, law, public administration, planning, public finance and land valuation.

== Later life and legacy ==
Else-Mitchell received a number of awards and degrees for his community work. These included being made a Companion of the Order of St Michael and St George (CMG) on 11 June 1977 for his services to the State and to historical research. He received an honorary Doctorate of Letters from Sydney University on 16 May 1984 for his influence on the writing of Australian history and the development of library services in Australia and an honorary Doctorate of Letters from Macquarie University in 1987. In 1978 he was awarded the Sidney Luker Memorial Medal for Planning from the Royal Australian Planning Institute for his work re land tenure and valuations. On 1 May 1986 the Australian Library and Information Association gave him the Redmond Barry Award for Library Promotion.

Else-Mitchell died at Canberra, in the Australian Capital Territory, on 29 June 2006, survived by his second wife, Margaret, and their daughter, Rosamund.

Government offices
Preceded by A. J. Dunston	President of the Library Council of New South Wales; 1974 – 1979	Succeeded by Dulcie Stretton
