= Peter Johnson (judge) =

Former justice of the Supreme Court of New South Wales

Peter Johnson SC is a former judge of the Supreme Court of New South Wales. He currently serves as Chief Commissioner of the New South Wales Law Enforcement Conduct Commission.

== Biography ==
Johnson earned a Bachelor of Arts in 1972 at Sydney University, where went on to receive a Bachelor of Laws in 1975 and a Master of Laws in 1982.

In 1976 he was admitted as a solicitor, and spent his first year in the Public Solicitor's Office (now Legal Aid NSW). Johnson was admitted as a barrister in 1982, and appointed Senior Counsel in 1997. He specialised in administrative, criminal, and appellate law.

He was sworn in as a judge of the Supreme Court of New South Wales on 1 February 2005, where he served until his retirement in 2022. He was subsequently appointed Chief Commissioner of the New South Wales Law Enforcement Conduct Commission on 4 July 2022.
