= Andrew Rogers (judge) =

Australian corporate and legal advisor (1933 – 2024)

Andrew John Rogers AO KC

Judge of the Supreme Court of New South Wales
- In office 1979–1993

Chief Judge of the Commercial Division
- In office 1987–1992

Personal details
- Born: 30 April 1933
- Died: 4 February 2024 (aged 90)
- Spouse: Helen Coonan
- Education: University of Sydney (LLB)
- Profession: Barrister, judge

Andrew John Rogers AO KC (30 April 1933 – 4 February 2024) was an Australian corporate and legal advisor, who was a Judge of the Supreme Court of New South Wales from 1979 to 1993.

Rogers was educated at the Schweizerische Alpine Mittelschule in Davos, Switzerland, and Cranbrook School, Sydney. He graduated from Sydney Law School at the University of Sydney with a Bachelor of Laws (LLB), and was admitted to the bar in New South Wales in 1956. In 1973, he was made Queen's Counsel. In 1979, he was appointed a Judge of the Supreme Court, and from 1987 to 1992 was the chief judge of the court's commercial division.

In the 1980s, Rogers took the unusual step of enforcing how barristers ran commercial cause cases in the Supreme Court. Fellow Supreme Court judge George Palmer, a commercial barrister at the time, recalled the changes as "shocking", "utterly brutal", and the most dramatic change to court procedure in 150 years.

Since his retirement from the bench in 1993, he worked as a legal consultant for the Australian Securities and Investments Commission (ASIC), the law firm Clayton Utz, and was the foundation Chancellor at Southern Cross University (1994 to 1998).

Rogers was married to the former Australian Senator Helen Coonan.
