= Roger Giles =

Australian judge

Roger David Giles KC is an Australian jurist. He is a former judge of the Court of Appeal of the Supreme Court of New South Wales, the highest court in the State of New South Wales, Australia, which forms part of the Australian court hierarchy. He retired as a Judge of Appeal on 23 December 2012.

He has served as an international judge of the Singapore International Commercial Court since its inception in 2015.

== Education ==
Giles was educated at the University of Sydney and the University of Oxford. Giles obtained a Bachelor of Laws in 1966 from the University of Sydney.
