= Bernard Sugerman =

Australian barrister, legal scholar, and judge

The Honourable Sir Bernard Sugerman QC
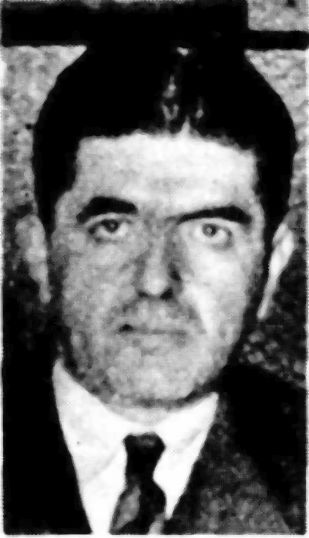
- Bernard Sugerman, 1947
- Born: Bernie Sugerman; 5 July 1904; Rockdale, New South Wales, Australia
- Died: 3 November 1976 (aged 72); Bellevue Hill, New South Wales, Australia
- Education: Sydney Boys High School, Kogarah Public School
- Alma mater: University of Sydney
- Occupations: Judge, Barrister
- Spouse: Sarah Rosenblum
- Children: David Sugerman, Alan Sugerman

Sir Bernard Sugerman (5 July 1904 – 3 November 1976) was an Australian barrister, legal scholar, and judge.

== Early life and education ==
Bernard Sugerman was born on 5 July 1904 at Rockdale, New South Wales to Solomon Ruben Sugerman and Florrie (née Green). Florrie was born in Sydney of Russian-Polish parents and died in 1905. Solomon Sugerman, a commercial traveller and stained glass manufacturer born in Scotland of Russian-Polish parents, remarried in 1907.

Sugerman attended Kogarah Public School, Sydney Boys High School and, having won an exhibition, the University of Sydney, where he enrolled in law. He was the Wigram Allen Scholar in 1922, Pitt Cobbet Prizeman in 1922, and John George Dalley Prizeman in 1925. Sugerman graduated with an LL.B. with First-Class Honours and co-University Medallist.

== Legal career ==
=== Barrister ===
Sugerman was admitted to the New South Wales Bar on 12 March 1926 and went into chambers with his friends David Roper and Alan Taylor. His practice grew slowly and he was appointed KC in October 1943, after which he began to be briefed in important constitutional cases before the High Court of Australia. He had been one of the Commonwealth's advisers at the 1942 Constitutional Convention.

=== Legal scholar and editor ===
Between 1926 and 1943, He lectured at his alma mater, the Sydney Law School, on contracts, mercantile law and torts.

He became the first editor (1927–46) of the Australian Law Journal (ALJ), only leaving that post on being elevated to the bench. On the presentation of his portrait to the New South Wales Supreme Court, it was said that the "endurance, renewal and national place of the ALJ is one of his most permanent monuments."

He was editor-in-chief of the Australian Digest (1934–39) and editor of the Commonwealth Law Reports (1942–46).

== Judicial career ==
Sugerman was appointed to the bench of the Commonwealth Court of Conciliation and Arbitration to make a full bench to hear the application by trade unions for a shorter standard working week of 40 hours.

On completion of that case, he resigned and was appointed to the New South Wales Supreme Court on 10 September 1947. His friend, David Roper was promoted from the Land and Valuation Court to be chief judge in equity and Sugerman took his place in the Land and Valuation Court and assisted in the equity jurisdiction.

Sugerman remained head of the Land and Valuation Court until 1961 but also was called upon to sit in equity and, over time, the Full Court and the Court of Appeal. He sat on the Full Court to hear the landmark New South Wales state constitutional law case of Clayton v Heffron where he joined the majority, writing a joint judgment with Chief Justice Evatt.

He was passed over for appointment as first president of the new Court of Appeal in 1966, but he became its second president on 22 January 1970 but ill health led him to retire on 29 September 1972.

== Community work ==
He was a council member of the New South Wales Bar Association (1939–43) and deputy-president of the Solicitors Admission Board (1941–43).

Sugerman was also active in Sydney's Jewish community.

== Personal life ==
At the Great Synagogue, Sydney, on 4 January 1928, Sugerman married Sarah Rosenblum, a schoolteacher from South Africa, with whom he had two sons.

=== Death ===
Sir Bernard Sugerman died on 3 November 1976. His funeral service was at the Great Synagogue, Sydney. His remains were interred at Rookwood.

== Awards and honours ==
In 1970, he was made a knight bachelor in the Queen's Birthday honours list.

In 1976, the honorary degree of Doctor of Laws was conferred upon him by the University of Sydney.

Legal offices
Preceded by Gordon Wallace	President of the New South Wales Court of Appeal; 1970–1972	Succeeded by Kenneth Jacobs
