= John Nagle =

Australian lawyer, jurist and soldier

The Honourable John Nagle AO QC

Justice of the Supreme Court of New South Wales
- In office 21 March 1960 – 10 July 1983
- Nominated by: Bob Heffron
- Appointed by: Sir Eric Woodward
- Preceded by: Sir Kenneth Street
- Succeeded by: David Hodgson

Chief Judge at Common Law
- In office 1979 – 10 July 1983
- Preceded by: Robert Taylor
- Succeeded by: Colin Begg

Personal details
- Born: 10 July 1913 Albury, New South Wales
- Died: 16 September 2009 (aged 96)
- Spouse: Stephanie Scott (m. 1944–1950)
- Education: Christian Brothers College, Albury
- Alma mater: University of Sydney

John Hailes Flood "Gaffer" Nagle (1913–2009) was a lawyer, soldier and prominent jurist, who served as a justice of the Supreme Court of New South Wales, Australia, from 1960 until 1983. Nagle led high-profile inquiries into the NSW Department of Corrective Services and the assassination of political candidate Donald Mackay.

== Early life ==
Born on 10 July 1913, Nagle was the second of nine children. His father, Valentine Flood Nagle, was a solicitor in Albury. Nagle entered the University of Sydney, residing at St John's College at age 15, completing an arts degree in 1932. Four years later, he completed a law degree, allowing him to follow in the footsteps of his father, grandfather and great-grandfather, all lawyers.

A few months after Nagle was admitted to the bar, Australia declared war on Germany. Nagle enlisted and served in the 2/5th Field Regiment, seeing action in Egypt, Syria and Lebanon. Following Japan's entry into the war, the regiment was deployed to the South Pacific, where Nagle served as a paratrooper. By the war's end, he had risen to the rank of major and was second-in-command of his battalion.

In 1944, he married Stephanie Mary Gilronan Scott and they had one child, Winsome. The marriage ended in 1950.

An avid sportsman, Nagle represented the Riverina district in rugby and Jaguar in the Monte Carlo Rally.

== Legal career ==
Following the war, Nagle returned to legal practice. Among his contemporaries in Sydney's legal fraternity were future Prime Minister Gough Whitlam and future Governor-General Sir William Deane. In 1960, Nagle was appointed to the State's Supreme Court by the Heffron Labor Government, just a year after taking silk.

Nagle enjoyed the respect of politicians on both sides, however, and was selected by the Willis Liberal Government to head a royal commission into the State's troubled prison system in 1976. Two months later, with the Liberals out of office, newly-elected Labor Premier Neville Wran removed the two other members of the commission, leaving Nagle to preside alone.

Nagle handed down his report in March 1978. Its 630 pages excoriated "an inefficient Department administering antiquated and disgraceful gaols; untrained and sometimes ignorant prison officers, resentful, intransigent and incapable of performing their tasks." The first of its 252 recommendations was the sacking of Commissioner of Corrective Services Walter McGeechan – though the Government dismissed McGeechan shortly before receiving Nagle's final report.

Nagle's report was influential well beyond his home State: Tony Vinson, who took over the Department from McGeechan, later observed that leading prison administrators the world over "invariably know of and allude to the Nagle Report as an important benchmark."

Nagle was promoted to chief judge at common law in 1979 and retired from the bench in 1983.

In 1981 he was appointed Officer of the Order of Australia.

== Later life ==
Nagle retired to his 700-hectare sheep and cattle property outside of Albury. Three years later, the Government recalled him to head up a special commission of inquiry into the police's handling of the assassination of Donald Mackay. Nagle's report criticised both the lead investigator, Joe Parrington, and former federal Labor minister Al Grassby.

In 1995, Nagle published a biography of David Collins, the first judge-advocate in colonial New South Wales.

Nagle was a patron of the arts, serving as a trustee of the Art Gallery of New South Wales and a patron of the Albury-Wodonga Regional Art Foundation. In his will he bequeathed a collection of Australian works to the Albury Regional Art Gallery, including paintings by his close friend Russell Drysdale.

Nagle died on 16 September 2009 at the age of 96.

Government offices
Preceded by Walter Bunning	President of the Board of Trustees of the Art Gallery of New South Wales; 1977 – 1980	Succeeded by Charles Benyon Lloyd Jones
