= Carolyn Simpson =

Australian judge

Hon. Justice Carolyn Chalmers Simpson AO

Judge of the Supreme Court of NSW
- In office 22 December 1993 – 29 March 2018

Personal details
- Born: 30 March 1946 (age 80) Forbes, New South Wales
- Education: Presbyterian Ladies' College, Sydney; Bathurst Teachers College; University of Sydney

Carolyn Chalmers Simpson AO (born 30 March 1946) is a former judge of the Supreme Court of New South Wales. Justice Simpson served on the Court for 24 years, including three years as a judge of its Court of Appeal. Justice Simpson made legal history in 1999 as one of three judges who formed the first all-female bench to sit in an Australian court. She was the second woman to be appointed to the Court, following the appointment of Justice Jane Matthews in 1987.

== Early life and education ==
Simpson was born 30 March 1946, at Forbes in the Central West of New South Wales, to William George and Janet Bower Chalmers.

She received her education as a boarder at the Presbyterian Ladies' College, Sydney at Croydon, and following matriculation attended Bathurst Teachers College (an antecedent to Charles Sturt University), graduating with a Diploma of Education in 1965. After five years of teaching followed by a failed attempt to gain employment as a journalist, a friend suggested she study law. She graduated from the University of Sydney with a Bachelor of Arts and then completed the Barristers Admission Board examinations.

== Career ==
Simpson served as an associate to a District Court judge. It was here that she realised her passion for law, stating: "I got hooked."

She was a member of the University of Sydney Law Extension Committee from 1972–76, an Officer of the Department of Youth and Community Services from 1974–76, President of the Society of Labor Lawyers, and President of the Council for Civil Liberties from 1976 to 1979. She was admitted to the New South Wales bar in 1976 and appointed a Queen's Counsel in 1989. In 1994, she was appointed a judge of the Supreme Court of New South Wales.

Justice Simpson made headlines in April 1999 when she, with Justices Margaret Beazley and Virginia Bell, sat as the New South Wales Court of Criminal Appeal in Sydney. The Court heard three appeals in that sitting, dismissing two and allowing one appeal against a conviction for indecent assault. According to the Women Lawyers Association of NSW, there had never been an all-female bench in England or New Zealand at the time. Subsequently, Simpson observed that, as more women were appointed judges in the Supreme Court, there would be more benches of three. "Given the opportunity, women achieve and do as well as men", she said.

Simpson sat in the Common Law Division of the Supreme Court of NSW until her elevation to the Court of Appeal in June 2015. Simpson retired as a full judge on 29 March 2018, however she continued to work as an Acting Justice in the NSW Court of Appeal until 2024.

In the 2019 Queen's Birthday Honours, Simpson was appointed Officer of the Order of Australia for her "distinguished service to the law, and to the judiciary, particularly in the areas of criminal, defamation, administrative, and industrial law".

== Notable decisions ==
Justice Simpson has presided over a number of high-profile cases. In 2005, she presided over the much publicised case Network Ten v Jessica Rowe. Ten claimed that the 5pm Ten News reader had breached her "open-ended" contract by failing to give six months' notice in writing. Simpson dismissed the action and ordered Ten to pay Rowe's court costs, finding that the contract was for a closed period of two years and expired at the conclusion of the case.

In 2007, she awarded around $1 million in damages for negligence to a teenager who was bullied at primary school. She concluded that the school had "grossly failed" to meet its duty of care to Benjamin Cox, causing him to develop a severe psychiatric condition.
