= John Dickinson (judge) =

Australian politician

Sir John Nodes Dickinson (1806 – 16 March 1882) was a judge and politician in colonial New South Wales.

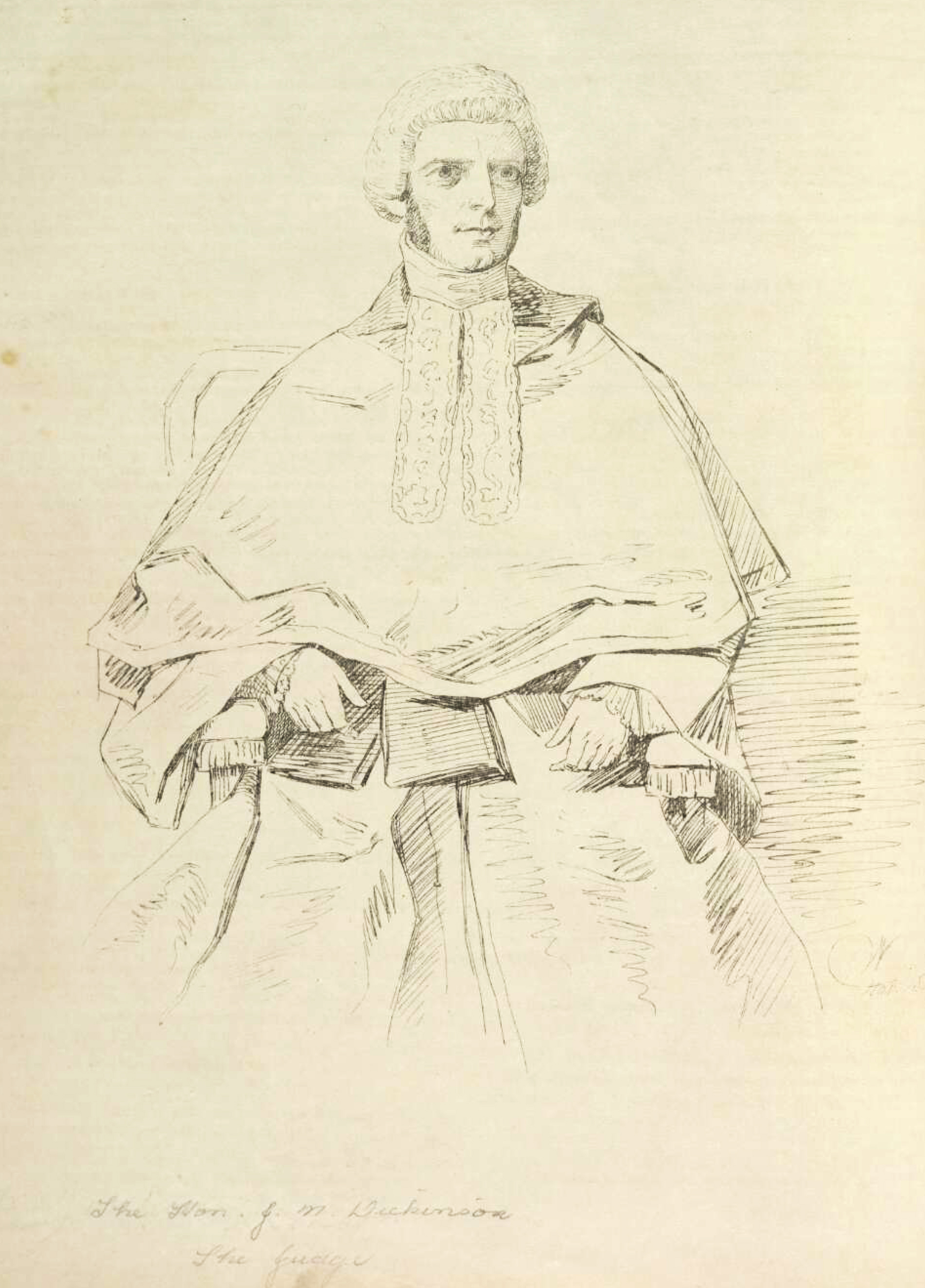
Portrait of John Nodes Dickinson, by William Nicholas, 1847-1848, from Baker, W. (1847). Heads of the People : An Illustrated Journal of Literature, Whims, and Oddities, State Library of New South Wales, Q059/H,

Dickinson was the son of Nodes Dickinson, F.R.C.S., of London, Staff-Surgeon to Her Majesty's Forces, and was born on the island of Grenada, West Indies. He was educated at Caius College, Cambridge, where he took his B.A. degree in 1829, and graduated M.A. in 1832. He was called to the bar at the Inner Temple in 1840. Dickinson married, early in 1844, Helen, daughter of Captain Henry Jauncey. In June 1844 Dickinson went to Sydney, in the Garland Grove, with the appointment of Puisne Judge of the Supreme Court of New South Wales. An 1851 portrait by Marshall Claxton of Dickinson with his wife and infant daughter hangs in the Art Gallery of NSW. Dickinson acted as chief justice of New South Wales from 15 February 1860 to 17 February 1861 during the absence of Sir Alfred Stephen.

On 22 May 1856, Dickinson was appointed to the New South Wales Legislative Council, a position he held until 29 March 1858. Dickinson was knighted in 1860, and retired in February 1861, returning to England on a pension of £1050 per annum. Dickinson lived in Bath, Somerset and then in London, with his wife and their daughter. He died on a visit to Rome on 16 March 1882.
