= Kenneth Jacobs (judge) =

Australian judge

The Honourable Sir Kenneth Jacobs KBE QC

Justice of the High Court of Australia
- In office 8 February 1974 – 6 April 1979
- Nominated by: Gough Whitlam
- Preceded by: Sir Cyril Walsh
- Succeeded by: Sir Ronald Wilson

Personal details
- Born: 5 October 1917 Sydney, New South Wales, Australia
- Died: 24 May 2015 (aged 97) United Kingdom
- Relations: Marjorie Jacobs, sister

Sir Kenneth Sydney Jacobs (5 October 1917 – 24 May 2015) was an Australian judge who served as a Justice of the High Court of Australia.

Jacobs was born in 1917 in Gordon, a suburb of Sydney, New South Wales. He was educated at Knox Grammar School, and later studied at the University of Sydney, where he graduated with a Bachelor of Arts in 1938. During World War II, from 1940 to 1945, Jacobs served in the Second Australian Imperial Force. He enlisted in Paddington in 1939, and remained in the service until 1948. Following his return from the war, Jacobs returned to the University of Sydney where he completed a Bachelor of Laws degree, winning the university's Medal for Law in 1946, and graduating in 1947. Later that year, Jacobs was admitted to the New South Wales Bar Association, where he practised as a barrister, and in 1958 he was made a Queen's Counsel.

In 1960 Jacobs was appointed as a Judge of the Supreme Court of New South Wales. In 1963, Jacobs was selected to serve a three-year term in Cyprus as the neutral presiding judge of the Supreme Constitutional Court of Cyprus, which was to be established following attempts to establish a constitution. However, following a period of civil unrest on 21 and 22 December 1963, the constitutional arrangements collapsed, and the court was never created. In 1966 Jacobs was elevated to the Court of Appeal of New South Wales. From 1972, Jacobs was President of the NSW Court of Appeal. Jacobs was appointed to the bench of the High Court on 8 February 1974. He was selected by Prime Minister Gough Whitlam and Attorney-General Lionel Murphy, and was thus the first High Court Justice to be appointed by a Labor government since William Webb in 1946. Murphy, who was himself appointed to the High Court the following year, praised Jacobs for humanitarianism and his excellent legal scholarship.

Jacobs was made a Knight Commander of the Order of the British Empire in 1976. He retired from the High Court on 6 April 1979. On 19 July 1979, Jacobs was granted life membership of the New South Wales Bar.

Legal offices
Preceded by Bernard Sugerman	President of the New South Wales Court of Appeal; 1972 – 1974	Succeeded by Athol Moffitt
