= Clifton Hoeben =

Australian judge and soldier (born 1947)

Clifton Ralph Russell Hoeben
- Born: 7 June 1947 (age 79)
- Military career
- Allegiance: Australia
- Branch: Australian Army Reserve
- Service years: 1965–c.2000
- Rank: Major General
- Commands: 2nd Division; 8th Brigade
- Awards: Member of the Order of Australia; Reserve Force Decoration

Major General Clifton Ralph Russell Hoeben, AM, RFD (born 7 June 1947) is an Australian judge and soldier.

== Early life and education ==
He was dux of the school at Saint Ignatius' College, Riverview in 1964 and graduated from the University of Sydney with a Bachelor of Arts Degree with First-Class Honours in Ancient Greek and Latin in 1968, a Bachelor of Laws Degree with Honours in 1972 and a Master of Laws Degree with Honours in 1984.

== Career ==
Hoeben was a judge of the Supreme Court of New South Wales. He retired from the Supreme Court bench on 31 August 2021.

Hoeben also rose to the rank of major general as Commander of the 2nd Division in the Australian Army Reserve.
