= A. H. Simpson =

Australian judge (1843–1918)

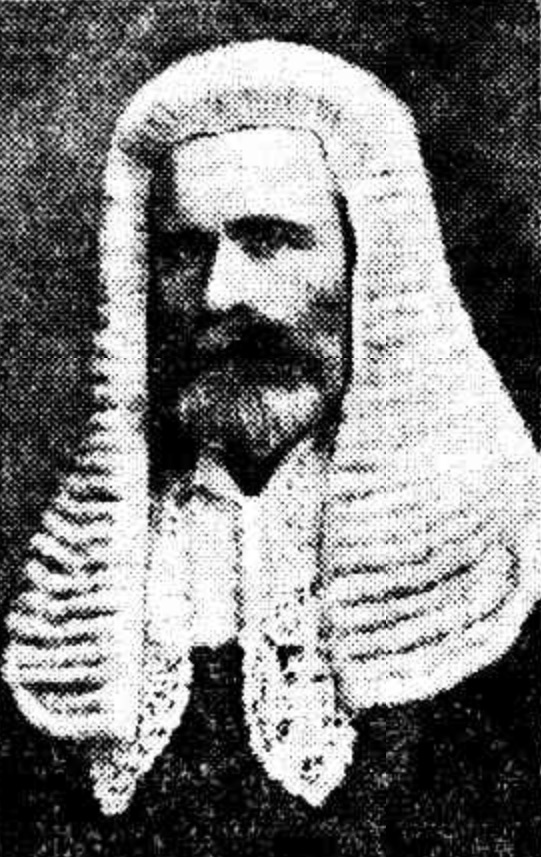
Archibald Henry Simpson

Archibald Henry Simpson (1 October 1843 – 2 October 1918) was a judge of the Supreme Court of New South Wales. He served as Chief Judge in Equity for over 20 years.

== Early life ==
Simpson was born at Clapham, England on 1 October 1843. He was educated at Tunbridge School, Kent. He entered Christ College, Cambridge, studying Law, graduating with a B.A. and an M.A. He was admitted to the Bar in 1868.

== Career ==
Simpslon emigrated to Australia in 1881 and devoted himself to Equity and Bankruptcy work. In 1885, he was admitted ad eundem AM by Sydney University. He was appointed Queen's Counsel in 1886 and elevated to the bench as aProbate and Bankruptcy judge. Simpson was elected to the University of Sydney senate in 1897 and in 1903 was appointed Vice-Chancellor.

In 1898 he succeeded Justice Manning as chief judge in equity. He notably disliked sitting for hours at a stretch, so had a sort of well constructed so that while hearing disputes he could stand, though the fact would not be obvious to the litigants.

== Personsl life ==
Simpson married Alice Marion Goldie in January 1885. They family included four sons and a daughter; their first son died in infancy:

- George Barre Goldie Simpson (7 January 1887 – 1915) was killed on the Western Front.
- Adam James Goldie Simpson (9 March 1888 – 14 August 1957)
- Hilda Marion "Ellen" Simpson (26 March 1890 – 21 August 1954)
- Claude Herbert Goldie Simpson (3 May 1893 – 19 April 1960)

Simpson died at his home, "St Ives", Hunter's Hill on 2 October 1918 at age 75, following a paralytic stroke. He was buried at the Field of Mars Cemetery, Ryde, New South Wales.

== Publications ==
- A Treatise on the Law and Practice Relating to Infants (1890) Stevens and Haynes, 603 pages

== See also ==
- List of judges of the Supreme Court of New South Wales
