= Robert Macfarlan (Australian judge) =

Australian judge

Robert Bruce Scott Macfarlan (born 22 November 1949) is a judge of the Court of Appeal of the Supreme Court of New South Wales, the highest court in the state of New South Wales, Australia, which forms part of the Australian court hierarchy.

== Education ==
Macfarlan is the son of Bruce Panton Macfarlan (1910-1978) and Barbara, daughter of H. R. Hamilton Scott. His father was a lecturer in law at the University of Sydney and a barrister, subsequently appointed a puisne judge of the Supreme Court of New South Wales, then judge in Admiralty and judge in Commercial Causes. Macfarlan's paternal grandfather, Alfred Ingram Macfarlan (1861-1929), was nephew of the timber merchant and philanthropist John Goodlet, and held a senior position in the family business, Goodlet & Smith, as company secretary.

Macfarlan was educated at Cranbrook School. He subsequently graduated in Arts and Law (with first class honours) from the University of Sydney.

== Career ==
From 1972 to 1976, Macfarlan worked as a solicitor at Sydney law firm Blake Dawson Waldron.

Macfarlan came to the bar in 1976 and was made Queen's Counsel in 1986. He served as a member of the Administrative Decisions Tribunal from 1999 to 2008 and as a member of the Legal Services Tribunal from 1994 to 1999.

In September 2008, Macfarlan was appointed to the NSW Court of Appeal.

== Personal life ==
In 1972, Macfarlan married Janine Carmel O'Brien; they had two sons and a daughter before the dissolution of their marriage in 1997. He married secondly, in 1998, literary consultant and former barrister Nicole Estelle, daughter of judge Alan Richard Abadee, AM, RFD; they have a son.
