= Peter Hidden =

Australian judge

Peter Hidden is an Australian jurist who served as a Justice of the Supreme Court of New South Wales from October 16, 1995 until 2016. Prior to this, Hidden worked as a public defender.

== Other activities ==
Hidden is known for his singing, and founded the New South Wales Bar Choir in 1995. As well, he sits on the board of directors of the Pacific Opera.
