= Cyril Walsh =

Australian judge

The Right Honourable Sir Cyril Walsh KBE

Justice of the High Court of Australia
- In office 20 September 1969 – 29 November 1973
- Nominated by: John Gorton
- Preceded by: Sir Alan Taylor
- Succeeded by: Sir Kenneth Jacobs

Personal details
- Born: 15 June 1909 Sydney, New South Wales, Australia
- Died: 29 November 1973 (aged 64) Sydney, New South Wales, Australia
- Spouse: Mary Smyth (m. 1942)

Sir Cyril Ambrose Walsh (15 June 1909 – 29 November 1973) was an Australian judge who served on the High Court of Australia from 1969 until his death in 1973.

== Early life ==
Walsh was born in Sydney, New South Wales, the son of Michael and Mary Walsh. He grew up in the western suburb of Werrington, where his father owned a dairy farm. He was educated at St Joseph's Convent School and later at Parramatta High School in the Sydney suburb of Parramatta. In 1926, he won the T E Rofe Prize, worth £6, for the best history essay in the state, writing on the Mutiny on the Bounty.

Walsh commenced studies at the University of Sydney in 1927, living at St John's College. Walsh graduated with a Bachelor of Arts in 1930 and a Bachelor of Laws in 1934, both with honours. He also won the University Medals in English, Philosophy and Law, and first-class honours in English, Philosophy and Latin, was awarded the James Coutts Scholarship for English and was the joint winner of the John George Dalley Prize. His cumulative undergraduate record is regarded as the finest record before or since for any law student at the university.

On 28 November 1942, Walsh married his wife Mary at the St Joseph's Catholic Church in Burwood Heights, they would later have three sons together. The family lived mainly in the inner western Sydney suburb of Summer Hill.

== Legal career ==
On 26 May 1934, Walsh was admitted to the New South Wales Bar, where he began to practise as a barrister. His office was located in the Chalfont Chambers building in central Sydney, where his neighbours included future Chief Justice of Australia and High Court colleague Garfield Barwick. Walsh's main work was in equity. He argued many equity cases in the Supreme Court of New South Wales in the 1940s and 1950s, and argued at least ten cases before the High Court in that time.

In January 1954, Walsh was made a Judge of the Supreme Court of New South Wales, an appointment which was widely accepted as well-deserved, although Walsh was relatively young at the age of 44. On 3 May 1955, Walsh was appointed to the Council of St John's College as a Fellow, and was later deputy chairman of the council from 1969 to 1972. In 1958 he was appointed as the head Judge of the newly established Commercial Causes List in the Supreme Court. The most notable case he was involved in at this time was the famous Wagon Mound (No 2) case, which was ultimately appealed to the Privy Council, which relied significantly on Walsh's findings of fact, almost all of which were not challenged. In 1962, Walsh was selected by Barwick (then the Foreign Minister of Australia) as Australia's representative to the United Nations Economic Commission for Asia and the Far East. On 1 January 1966, he was elevated to the newly established Court of Appeal of New South Wales (a branch of the Supreme Court), the first specialist appellate court in Australia.

== High Court ==
Walsh was appointed to the High Court on 3 October 1969. Also that year he was made a Knight Commander of the Order of the British Empire, and on 1 January 1971 was appointed to the Judicial Committee of the Privy Council. Walsh was only on the High Court for a short period of time, but participated in several important cases including the Concrete Pipes case and the Payroll Tax case.

Walsh remained on the bench of the High Court until his death from multiple myeloma on 29 November 1973. The High Court sat on 30 November in a special sitting to commemorate Walsh. Barwick, then the Chief Justice, delivered the eulogy in which he said: "The Court has lost a Justice from whom increasingly distinguished service was confidently expected."
