= Gordon Wallace (judge) =

Australian judge

Sir Gordon Wallace QC, born Gordon Isaacs (22 January 1900 – 11 December 1987) was an Australian judge.

Wallace was born at Redfern in Sydney to coachbuilder Jacob Albert Clarke Isaacs and Euphemia, née Wallace. He attended Sydney Boys High School from 1912 to 1915, and in 1916 entered the Royal Military College, Duntroon, as a staff cadet. He graduated as a lieutenant on 10 December 1919 and worked for the British Army before joining the Australian Staff Corps (1920–1922). After his resignation he served in the Citizen Military Forces, becoming a major by 1929. He also studied law at the University of Sydney, receiving his Bachelor of Law in 1927. He married Marjorie Mary Mullins on 19 May 1927 at Vaucluse, converting to Anglicanism from congregationalism.

Isaacs was called to the bar on 10 May 1928 and changed his name by deed poll in 1933 in order to counter anti-Semitism, although he was never Jewish. He was appointed King's Counsel in 1940, and wrote on Australian company law with Percy Spender and later with John Young. World War II saw him resumed service with the Citizen Military Forces and from 1942 with the Australian Imperial Force. He commanded an anti-aircraft battery in Sydney from 1940 to 1942 and was briefly posted to New Guinea and the Northern Territory. He was transferred to the reserve of officers as an honorary colonel in October 1944. In 1940 he had run as one of three United Australia Party candidates for the federal seat of Parramatta.

Wallace appeared frequently before the High Court and often represented the New South Wales commissioner of stamp duties before the Judicial Committee of the Privy Council. From 1952 to 1953 he was a member of the Commonwealth committee on taxation and he appeared before the royal commission on liquor laws (1951–54) on behalf of Tooth & Co. From 1956 to 1958 he was president of the New South Wales Bar Association and in 1957 suggested the idea for the Australian Bar Association, founded in 1962. He was vice-president of the Law Council of Australia in 1957.

Wallace was appointed a judge of the Supreme Court of New South Wales in March 1960, and supported the creation of a Court of Appeal, becoming inaugural president in January 1966. He was knighted in 1968 and acting chief justice from 1 October 1968 to 3 February 1969; his swift rise in seniority earned him the ire of some colleagues. From 1960 to 1965 he was president of the International Law Association's Australian branch. He was also active in the community as president of the Australasian Pioneers' Club (1962–64), the University Club (1969–71) and the Elanora Country Club. In January 1970, having reached the statuary retirement age, he was instead called upon to preside over the 1970–74 royal commission into oil drilling on the Great Barrier Reef. His wife died in 1980 and Wallace followed her at Wahroonga in 1987, survived by his daughter and son.

Legal offices
New title	President of the New South Wales Court of Appeal; 1966–1970	Succeeded by Sir Bernard Sugerman
