= Michael Walton (judge) =

Australian judge and legal scholar

The Honourable Justice Michael Walton

Justice of the Supreme Court of New South Wales
- Incumbent
- Assumed office 8 December 2016
- Common Law Division

President of the Industrial Relations Commission of New South Wales / Industrial Court of NSW
- In office 2014–2016

Personal details
- Occupation: Judge, legal scholar
- Profession: Lawyer

Michael J. Walton is an Australian judge who has served on the Supreme Court of New South Wales (Common Law Division) since 8 December 2016. He was previously President of the Industrial Relations Commission of New South Wales and a judicial member of the Industrial Court of New South Wales.

== Judicial career ==
Walton was appointed a Justice of the Supreme Court of New South Wales on 8 December 2016 at a formal swearing-in ceremony attended by members of the judiciary, legal profession, and public officials.

He previously served as the President of the Industrial Relations Commission of New South Wales between 2014 and 2016 and as a judicial member of the Industrial Court of NSW.

== Academic and public engagement ==
Walton has contributed to legal scholarship and public discourse through lectures, publications, and university partnerships. In 2020, he delivered a public keynote address for the University of Wollongong’s Sydney Business School on the future of workplace relations.

He has published work in the field of industrial and labour law, including the paper "The Lost Art of Industrial Advocacy" delivered as part of the Industrial Relations Commission speech series.

== Professional recognition and affiliations ==
Walton is acknowledged in public records as a senior judicial figure and long-serving contributor to industrial and labour law. The Sydney University Lawn Tennis Club identifies him as a member and notes his judicial roles, including his presidency of the Industrial Court of NSW.
