= Alan Taylor (Australian judge) =

Australian judge

The Right Honourable Sir Alan Taylor KBE, QC

Justice of the High Court of Australia
- In office 3 September 1952 – 3 August 1969
- Nominated by: Robert Menzies
- Preceded by: Sir Owen Dixon
- Succeeded by: Sir Cyril Walsh

Personal details
- Born: 25 November 1901 Newcastle, New South Wales Australia
- Died: 3 August 1969 (aged 67)

Sir Alan Russell Taylor (25 November 1901 – 3 August 1969) was an Australian judge who served as a Justice of the High Court of Australia from 1952 until his death in 1969.

== Early life ==
Taylor was born in 1901 in Newcastle, New South Wales. Brought up in an Anglican family, Taylor initially wanted to join the church, but obtained a job as a public servant while waiting to study to be a priest, and was eventually employed in the office of the Solicitor-General of Australia, where he developed an interest in law.

Taylor studied at Fort Street Boys' High School and the University of Sydney, graduating with a Bachelor of Laws degree, with honours, in 1926. Later that year, he was admitted to the New South Wales Bar. In 1933, he married Ceinwen Williams, with whom he would later have a son and a daughter.

== Career as a lawyer ==
From 1933 to 1938, he was a Challis Lecturer in the law school at the University of Sydney, teaching equity and company law. He was made a King's Counsel in 1943, and began to have an increasing number of appearances before the High Court. From 1947 to 1948, Taylor represented the banks in the famous Bank Nationalisation case, as part of a team led by future Chief Justice of Australia Garfield Barwick, also including future High Court colleague Frank Kitto. From 1948 to 1949, Taylor was President of the New South Wales Bar Association.

== Judicial career ==
Taylor was made a Judge of the Supreme Court of New South Wales in 1952, and later that year, on 3 September, he was appointed to the bench of the High Court. He was appointed following the retirement of John Latham and the elevation of Owen Dixon as Chief Justice earlier in the year. According to David Marr, Taylor was never as close to Dixon as some of the other justices, such as Kitto or Fullagar, and had a blunter judicial style than Dixon. Dixon was succeeded in 1964 by Garfield Barwick. Taylor had worked with him on a number of cases, including the Banks case, and they shared some common views on Australian constitutional law, as well as having a similar judicial style. Although Taylor worked better with Barwick than with Dixon, all of his colleagues agreed that he was a hard-working and congenial judge.

Taylor was made a Knight Commander of the Order of the British Empire in 1955, and was appointed to the Privy Council in 1963. At the invitation of the Lord Chancellor, Baron Gardiner, Taylor spent three months in 1967 in London hearing Privy Council appeals.

In May 1968, Taylor suffered a heart attack, but after a short break he returned to full duties on the High Court. Barwick later said that although the heart attack certainly affected Taylor physically, he was just as dedicated to his work as he had previously been. Taylor continued to serve on the High Court until his death in August 1969, when he died suddenly one Sunday morning. In a tribute published in the Commonwealth Law Reports, Barwick said of Taylor that he was:

"...wise in conference, confident and practical in decision and gentle in dissent... [what] is uppermost in our minds is the warmth of his friendship, his unfailing good humour, and his ready turn of wit and phrase on all occasions, making our daily association with him pleasant and memorable... The Court has lost a great judge, each of us here has lost a close friend."
