= Mallesons =

Australian-based law firm

- Headquarters: Governor Phillip Tower; Sydney, New South Wales; Australia
- No. of offices: 6
- No. of employees: 1,200+ lawyers
- Key people: David Freelander (Chairman); Renae Lattey (Chief Executive Partner)
- Date founded: 1832 (Stone James); 1878 (Stephen Jaques and Stephen); 1982 (Stephen Jacques Stone James); 1987 (Mallesons Stephen Jaques); 2012 (King & Wood Mallesons); 2026 (Mallesons)
- Company type: Partnership
- Website: mallesons.com

Mallesons is a commercial law firm based in Australia. It has 5 offices in Australia and 1 office in Singapore, with over 1200 lawyers. It was originally founded in 1832 and was re-founded in 2026.

Prior to the formation of the current form of Mallesons, its predecessor was King and Wood Mallesons, which was the largest international commercial law firm based in the Asia-Pacific formed of SJ Berwin, one of the United Kingdom's "Silver Circle", Mallesons Stephen Jaques, one of the "Big Six" Australian law firms, and King & Wood, one of China's "Red Circle" law firms.

== History ==
=== Mallesons Stephen Jaques ===
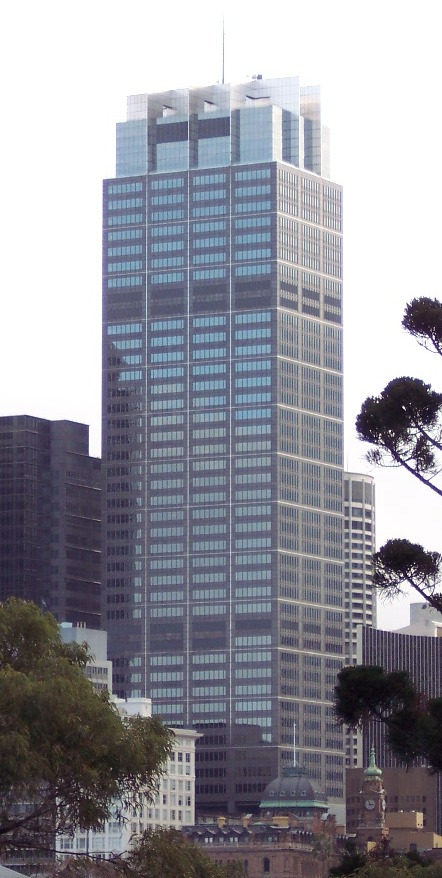
Governor Phillip Tower in Sydney, Mallesons' Australian headquarters

Mallesons Stephen Jaques was an Australian law firm which originated in 1832 in Western Australia and was one of the "Big Six" law firms in Australia.

'Mallesons' derives from the name of the predecessor firm's founding partner; Alfred Brooks Malleson. Malleson was born at Richmond Hill, on the Surrey side of the Thames in 1831. As a 25-year-old London solicitor he immigrated to Melbourne in 1856. Malleson's obituary in The Argus in 1892 recorded that his expertise was especially "in company law and in the banking business. Several of the associated banks entrusted their legal affairs to the firm, as well as a large number of leading insurance and other companies, so that Mr Malleson had always as much as he could do". In 1858, the firm (then called "Muttlebury Malleson and Coster") handled the legal work to establish The National Bank of Australasia, which remains one of the firm's key clients as the present-day National Australia Bank.

The "Stephen" part of the firm's former name comes from Sydney founder Montague Stephen. He was the second son of Sir Alfred Stephen, the Chief Justice of the Supreme Court of New South Wales from 1844 to 1873. Montague Stephen founded a Sydney practice in 1849. One of his earliest (1853) clients was the "Australian Mutual Provident Society" (AMP Limited) which remains one of the modern firm's key clients. The "Jaques" part of the firm's name comes from a second "Alfred" – Alfred Jaques. He became a partner of the Sydney firm in 1878. In 1888 the firm's name changed to Stephen Jaques & Stephen – a name which continued until the 1980s.

In 1976, Stephen Jaques & Stephen established its London office. In 1982, it merged with Stone James of Perth. The merged firm was called "Stephen Jaques Stone James". Stone James had been established in 1832 by Alfred Stone, Western Australia's first solicitor. The merger reflected a growing importance of Western Australian primary industries as clients to the firm.

In 1987, Stephen Jaques Stone James merged with Mallesons. The firm was renamed "Mallesons Stephen Jaques". The 1987 merger was driven by an assessment that Sydney and Melbourne had become one legal market. The merger enabled the firm to look after clients in Sydney, Melbourne, Perth and Canberra. In 1989, the firm opened an office in Brisbane. The firm opened a Hong Kong office in 1989, and a Beijing office in 1993. It established an alliance with Posman Kua Aisi Lawyers of Port Moresby, Papua New Guinea in 1995. In 2004 the firm strengthened its Beijing resources by taking on lawyers and support staff from Denton Wilde Sapte. Later that year Mallesons merged with the Hong Kong and Shanghai corporate boutique Kwok & Yih.

=== King & Wood Mallesons ===
On 1 March 2012, the firm merged with the Chinese firm King & Wood PRC Lawyers to form King & Wood Mallesons (KWM) following votes in November 2011. KWM in the following year in 2013 merged with UK Silver Circle firm SJ Berwin.

=== Mallesons ===
In December 2025, KWM announced that their Chinese and Australian partnership will come to an end on 31 March 2026, with the law firm reverting to the pre-merger brands of "King & Wood" and "Mallesons" for China and Australia respectively.

Following the split, King & Wood retained KWM's offices in China, Hong Kong, Japan, Canada, and the United States, whereas Mallesons had retained KWM's offices in Australia and Singapore.

== Notable alumni ==
=== Judges ===
==== High Court of Australia ====
- Jayne Jagot, justice
- Simon Steward AC, justice
- Geoffrey Nettle AC, justice

==== Federal courts ====
- Emilios Kyrou AO, judge of the Federal Court of Australia and President of the Administrative Appeals Tribunal
- Nye Perram, judge of the Federal Court of Australia
- Lisa Hespe, judge of the Federal Court of Australia

==== State courts ====
- Reginald Barrett AO, judge of the Supreme Court of New South Wales
- Patricia Bergin AO, Chief Judge in Equity of the Supreme Court of New South Wales
- Ashley Black, judge of the Supreme Court of New South Wales
- Peter Brereton, judge of the Supreme Court of New South Wales
- Joanne Cameron, judge of the Supreme Court of Victoria
- Michael Corboy, judge of the Supreme Court of Western Australia
- David Davies, judge of the Supreme Court of New South Wales
- James Emmett, judge of the Supreme Court of New South Wales
- Tim Faulkner, judge of the Supreme Court of New South Wales
- Stephen Free, judge of the Supreme Court of New South Wales
- Trish Henry, judge of the Supreme Court of New South Wales
- Graham Hilley, judge of the Supreme Court of the Northern Territory
- Mark Leeming, judge of the Supreme Court of New South Wales
- Michael Lundberg, judge of the Supreme Court of Western Australia
- Patricia Matthews, judge of the Supreme Court of Victoria
- Lucy McCallum, Chief Justice of the Australian Capital Territory
- Anthony McGrath, judge of the Supreme Court of New South Wales
- Anna Mitchelmore, judge of the Supreme Court of New South Wales
- Henric Nicholas, judge of the Supreme Court of New South Wales
- Ian Pike, judge of the Supreme Court of New South Wales
- Brian Preston, Chief Judge of the Land and Environment Court of New South Wales and judge of the Supreme Court of New South Wales
- Kelly Rees, judge of the Supreme Court of New South Wales
- Nigel Rein, judge of the Supreme Court of New South Wales
- Larissa Strk, judge of the Supreme Court of Western Australia
- Julie Ward, President of the New South Wales Court of Appeal
- Richard Weeks White, judge of the Supreme Court of New South Wales
- Frances Williams, judge of the Supreme Court of Queensland
- Robertson Wright, judge of the Supreme Court of New South Wales

=== Lawyers ===
- Matthew Collins AM, Victorian barrister and president of the Australian Bar Association
- Colin Stephen, lawyer and chairman of the Australian Jockey Club

=== Politics and public service ===
==== Federal politicians ====
- Bob Carr, Minister for Foreign Affairs and Senator for New South Wales
- Josh Frydenberg, Treasurer of Australia, Deputy Leader of the Liberal Party of Australia and Member for Kooyong
- Paul Fletcher, Minister for Communications and Member for Bradfield
- Varun Ghosh, Senator for Western Australia
- John Howard OM AC SSI, former Prime Minister of Australia
- Greg Hunt, former Federal Minister for Health and Aged Care, and Member for Flinders
- Julian Leeser, Shadow Minister and Member for Berowra
- Leon Rebello, Federal Member for McPherson
- Paul Scarr, Senator for Queensland
- Matt Thistlethwaite, Assistant Minister for Foreign Affairs and Trade, and Member for Kingsford Smith
- Keith Wolahan, Federal Member for Menzies
- Tim Watts, Federal Member for Gellibrand

==== State politicians ====
- Abigail Boyd, Member of the New South Wales Legislative Council
- Bob Carr, Premier of New South Wales
- Jenny Mikakos, former Minister for Health of Victoria
- Consett Stephen, member New South Wales Legislative Assembly
- Septimus Stephen, member of the New South Wales Legislative Council
- Gabrielle Upton, former Attorney-General of New South Wales

==== Public servants ====
- Tony D'Aloisio AM, former Chairman of the Australian Securities and Investments Commission and CEO of the Australian Securities Exchange
- Noel Tanzer AC, former Secretary of the Department of the Arts and Administrative Services

=== Academia and the arts ===
- Joellen Riley, former Dean of the Sydney Law School
- Margaret Somerville AM, bioethicist and professor of law at the University of Notre Dame and McGill University
- Michael Spence, former Vice-Chancellor of the University of Sydney
- Gillian Triggs AC, former Assistant Secretary-General of the United Nations, President of the Australian Human Rights Commission, and Dean of the Sydney Law School
- Sarah Wynn-Williams, New Zealand author

== See also ==
- King & Wood Mallesons, the predecessor firm to Mallesons
- List of oldest companies in Australia
