= King & Wood Mallesons =

International law firm

- No. of offices: 26
- No. of employees: 3,000+ lawyers
- Major practice areas: Commercial Law
- Key people: Sue Kench (Global Chief Executive); Wang Junfeng (Global Chairman)
- Date founded: 2012 (by merger)
- Company type: Swiss Verein structure
- Dissolved: 30 March 2026
- Website: www.kwm.com

King & Wood Mallesons (KWM) was the largest international commercial law firm based in the Asia-Pacific. It had 26 offices and over 3,000 legal professionals across Asia and North America.

Prior to KWM's current structure, its predecessor firms included SJ Berwin of the United Kingdom's "Silver Circle", Mallesons Stephen Jaques, one of the "Big Six" Australian law firms, and King & Wood, one of China's "Red Circle" law firms.

In December 2025, KWM announced that their Chinese and Australian partnership would come to an end on 31 March 2026, with the law firm reverting to the pre-merger brands of "King & Wood" and "Mallesons" for China and Australia respectively.

The partnership was formally dissolved on 30 March 2026.

== History ==
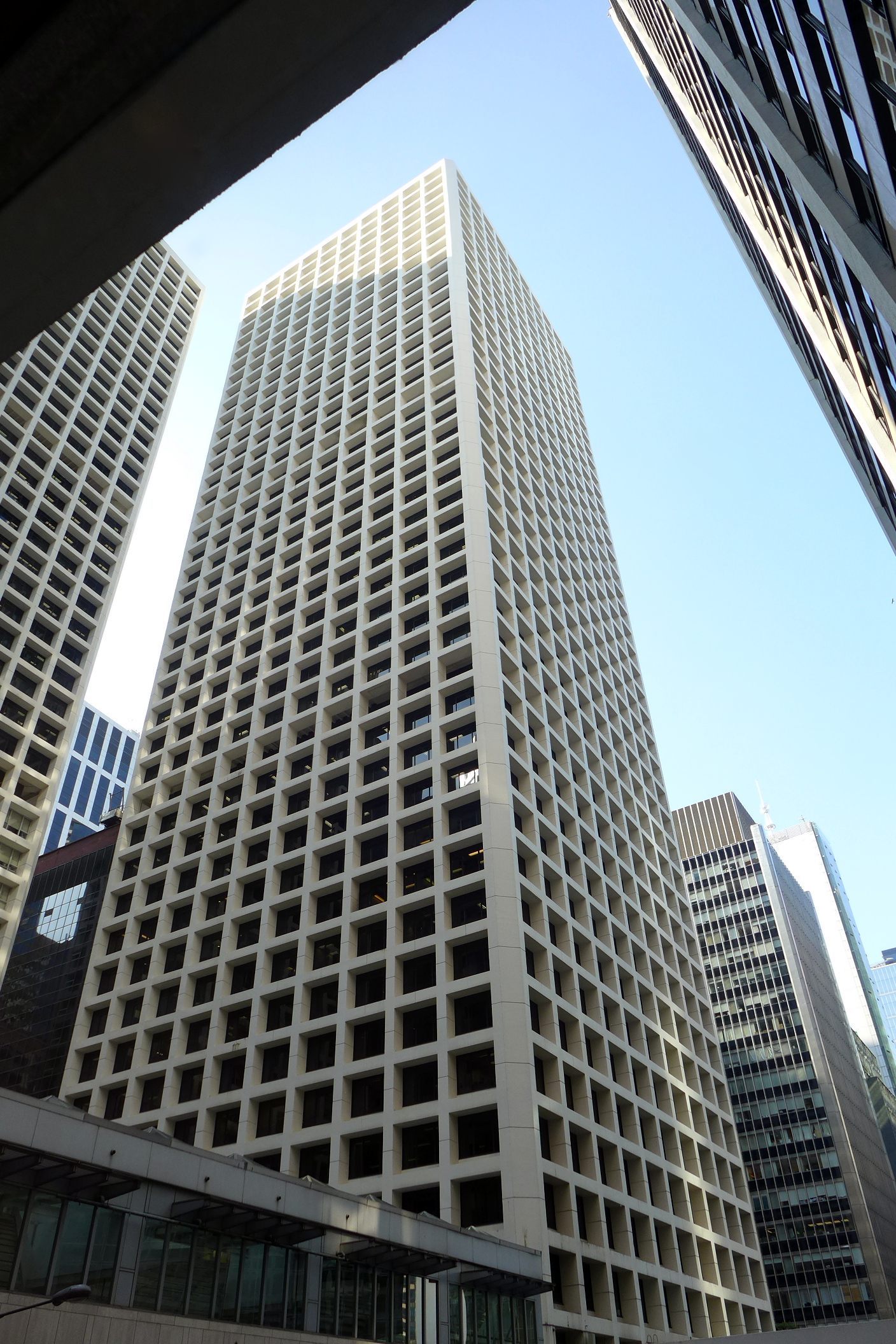
Gloucester Tower, KWM's Hong Kong office

=== Predecessor firm history ===
==== Mallesons Stephen Jaques ====
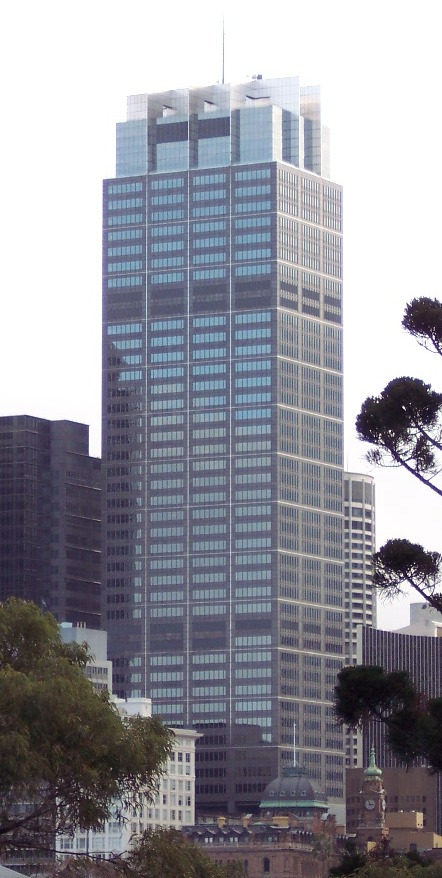
Governor Phillip Tower in Sydney, KWM's Australian headquarters

Mallesons Stephen Jaques was an Australian law firm which originated in 1832 and was one of the "Big Six" law firms in Australia.

'Mallesons' derives from the name of the predecessor firm's founding partner; Alfred Brooks Malleson. Malleson was born at Richmond Hill, on the Surrey side of the Thames in 1831. As a 25-year-old London solicitor he immigrated to Melbourne in 1856. Malleson's obituary in The Argus in 1892 recorded that his expertise was especially "in company law and in the banking business. Several of the associated banks entrusted their legal affairs to the firm, as well as a large number of leading insurance and other companies, so that Mr Malleson had always as much as he could do". In 1858, the firm (then called "Muttlebury Malleson and Coster") handled the legal work to establish The National Bank of Australasia, which remains one of the firm's key clients as the present-day National Australia Bank.

The "Stephen" part of the firm's former name comes from Sydney founder Montague Stephen. He was the second son of Sir Alfred Stephen, the Chief Justice of the Supreme Court of New South Wales from 1844 to 1873. Montague Stephen founded a Sydney practice in 1849. One of his earliest (1853) clients was the "Australian Mutual Provident Society" (AMP Limited) which remains one of the modern firm's key clients. The "Jaques" part of the firm's name comes from a second "Alfred" – Alfred Jaques. He became a partner of the Sydney firm in 1878. In 1888 the firm's name changed to Stephen Jaques & Stephen – a name which continued until the 1980s.

In 1976, Stephen Jaques & Stephen established its London office. In 1982, it merged with Stone James of Perth. The merged firm was called "Stephen Jaques Stone James". Stone James had been established in 1832 by Alfred Stone, Western Australia's first solicitor. The merger reflected a growing importance of Western Australian primary industries as clients to the firm.

In 1987, Stephen Jaques Stone James merged with Mallesons. The firm was renamed "Mallesons Stephen Jaques". The 1987 merger was driven by an assessment that Sydney and Melbourne had become one legal market. The merger enabled the firm to look after clients in Sydney, Melbourne, Perth and Canberra. In 1989, the firm opened an office in Brisbane. The firm opened a Hong Kong office in 1989, and a Beijing office in 1993. It established an alliance with Posman Kua Aisi Lawyers of Port Moresby, Papua New Guinea in 1995. In 2004 the firm strengthened its Beijing resources by taking on lawyers and support staff from Denton Wilde Sapte. Later that year Mallesons merged with the Hong Kong and Shanghai corporate boutique Kwok & Yih.

==== King & Wood PRC Lawyers ====
King & Wood was among the first law firms established in the People's Republic of China during the modern era. In April, 1993, King & Wood's founding partners were still working with a state-sponsored organization, the China Council for the Promotion of International Trade, when the central government permitted private ownership of law firms, allowing them to create the firm.

The firm's clients included Citigroup, China Life, Walmart, PetroChina, Bank of China, the Beijing Organizing Committee for the Olympic Games of the 2008 Summer Olympics. Prior to merging with Mallesons Stephen Jacques, King & Wood was aligned with Australian law firm Gilbert + Tobin.

==== SJ Berwin ====
SJ Berwin was founded by lawyer Stanley J. Berwin 1982. From 1992 the firm underwent a strategy of European expansion. In 2009 the firm opened three offices in Hong Kong, Dubai and Shanghai respectively.

==== Merger ====
King & Wood Mallesons formed on 1 March 2012 as a combination of Chinese firm King & Wood PRC Lawyers and Australian firm Mallesons Stephen Jaques, following votes in November 2011.

In 2013 a merger was announced between King & Wood Mallesons and the UK Silver Circle firm SJ Berwin.

The firm used a Swiss Verein structure, and had four financially independent partnerships: Australia; Europe and the Middle East; Hong Kong; and Mainland China, Japan and the United States.

==== Demise of KWM Europe ====
In 2016 a substantial number of important partners at KWM Europe left the firm, and attempts to find merger partners failed. It was subsequently announced the firm was being advised by external administrators.

In November 2016 a memorandum was circulated to European partners of KWM outlining terms of a potential 'bail out' under which they would have to commit to a 12 month lock-in period, and provide capital to the firm. Additional capital would be provided by the Chinese arm of the business. This deal failed to win approval, and by the end of November KWM announced it would disband its European partnership. The law firms of Goodwin Procter and Covington & Burling were in discussions to hire key partners from KWM Europe. In January 2017, the European arm became subject to administration and ceased operations. The Australian, mainland Chinese, and Hong Kong portions of KWM, which were financially and legally separate, were otherwise unaffected.

Following the insolvency of KWM Europe, the remaining Asia-Pacific side of the firm established a new business to maintain a strategic presence in the UK, Europe & the Middle East to service the needs of its global clients. KWM at that time established core practices in London, Frankfurt, Madrid, Milan, Brussels and Dubai. New companies of the KWM network were established in the UK (KWM Europe LLP) and Germany (KWM Europe Rechtsanwaltsgesellschaft mbH). The new European platform focused on Corporate M&A, Finance, Competition and Dispute Resolution and had more than 30 partners, together with associates and support staff.

In 2023, KWM China announced that it would, subject to regulatory requirements, cease to operate in the UK, Europe and the Middle East by 31 October 2024, as part of a cooperation agreement reached with Eversheds Sutherland (International).

=== Separation ===
In December 2025, KWM announced that their Chinese and Australian partnership would come to an end on 31 March 2026, with the law firm reverting to the pre-merger brands of "King & Wood" and "Mallesons" for China and Australia respectively. Following the split, King & Wood retained offices in mainland China, Hong Kong, Japan, Canada, and the United States, whereas Mallesons had retained KWM’s offices in Australia and Singapore.

== Operations ==
=== Finances ===
In 2012–13, the firm's total global revenue was US$1 billion, with revenue per lawyer of US$453,000 in China, and profit per equity partner of AU$1.08 million in Australia and £610,000 in Europe.

=== Pro bono ===
King & Wood Mallesons had a community impact practice which supports the community through pro bono legal services, community services, and philanthropy.

In 2021, more than 91% of the firm's Australian lawyers took part in pro bono work, contributing over 54,000 pro bono hours.

The firm was a long-time partner of Youth Law Australia, a community legal centre that provides free legal services to children and young people across Australia. The firm provides a full-time solicitor on secondment to Youth Law Australia and the firm's solicitors also volunteer as part of the Cyber Volunteer Program. Other organisations supported by the firm's pro bono services include: homeless law clinics, refugee legal clinics, and the Arts Law Centre. TalkLaw was the firm's community legal education initiative which educates disadvantaged high school students across Australia about legal topics relevant to young people. The KWM School of Opportunity provides disadvantaged young people with a work placement and skills development program.

== Notable cases and transactions ==
=== Australia ===
- Advised on the merger of Glencore and Xstrata.
- Advised Square Inc (now Block Inc) on its A$39 billion acquisition of Afterpay Ltd, the largest M&A deal in Australian history.
- Advised Lygon on the creation of the world's first digital bank guarantee using blockchain technology.
- Advised Woolworths on its A$400 million green loan, the first supermarket in the world to issue certified green bonds.
- Advised Sydney Airport on its A$1.4 billion sustainability-linked loan, the first syndicated sustainability-linked loan in Australia and the largest in Asia-Pacific.

=== China ===
- Advised on the initial public offering of PetroChina.
- Sole legal advisor to the Beijing Organising Committee of the Games of the XXIX Olympiad.
- Advised Microsoft with respect to an antimonopoly investigation by the State Administration for Industry and Commerce.
- Advised Baidu on its HK$24 billion secondary listing on the Hong Kong Stock Exchange.

=== United Kingdom ===
- Advised Lion Capital LLP on a string of deals including on the acquisition of fashion chain AllSaints from Icelandic banks Kaupthing and Glitnir, and the £1.4 billion acquisition of French frozen food business Picard Surgelés.

== Awards and recognition ==
Awards and recognition include:

- Law Firm of the Year, Australasian Law Awards (2022, 2023)
- Australian Law Firm of the Year, Chambers Asia-Pacific Awards (2020, 2024)
- Chinese Law Firm of the Year, Chambers Asia-Pacific Awards (2020)
- Regional Law Firm of the Year, IFLR Asia Awards (2020, 2021, 2023)
- Chambers Asia-Pacific Band 1 rankings across a record 21 practice areas
- Largest International Law Firm in Hong Kong, ALB Asia Top 50 Rankings (2021)
- Golden League Award, China Business Law Awards by Law.asia (2024)

== Criticism ==
In 2018, WorkSafe Victoria launched an investigation into the firm, following complaints of overworked staff due to the high demands of working on the Banking Royal Commission. Responses made by the firm to the investigation were reported by the AFR.

In 2024, with regard to United States sanctions against China, King & Wood Mallesons advised its clients in China not to release public statements that "could attract the suspicion of or trigger an investigation by US regulators".

== Notable alumni ==
The following list includes notable people who have worked at King & Wood Mallesons.

- Jayne Jagot – High Court of Australia Justice
- Simon Steward – High Court of Australia Justice
- Geoffrey Nettle – former High Court of Australia Justice
- Emilios Kyrou – President of the Administrative Appeals Tribunal, Federal Court of Australia judge, and former Victorian Supreme Court Judge
- Nye Perram - Federal Court of Australia Judge
- Lisa Hespe - Federal Court of Australia Judge
- Lucy McCallum – ACT Chief Justice
- Julie Ward – NSW Court of Appeal President
- Mark Leeming - NSW Supreme Court Judge
- Anna Mitchelmore - NSW Supreme Court Judge
- Ashley Black – NSW Supreme Court Judge
- Kelly Rees – NSW Supreme Court Judge
- Reginald Barrett – NSW Supreme Court Judge
- Richard Weeks White – NSW Supreme Court Judge
- Trish Henry – NSW Supreme Court Judge
- Ian Pike - NSW Supreme Court Judge
- Anthony McGrath - NSW Supreme Court Judge
- David Davies - NSW Supreme Court Judge
- Robertson Wright - NSW Supreme Court Judge
- Tim Faulkner, NSW Supreme Court Judge
- Patricia Bergin – former NSW Supreme Court Chief Judge in Equity
- Frances Williams - Queensland Supreme Court Judge
- Patricia Matthews - Victorian Supreme Court Judge
- Joanne Cameron – former Victorian Supreme Court Judge
- Michael Lundberg - WA Supreme Court judge
- Larissa Strk – WA Supreme Court Judge
- Michael Corboy – WA Supreme Court Judge

== See also ==
- List of oldest companies in Australia
