= King & Wood =

Chinese law firm

King & Wood 金杜律师事务所
- No. of offices: 24
- No. of employees: 2000+ lawyers
- Date founded: 1993 (originally); 2026 (re-reestablished as separate brand following Mallesons split)
- Founder: Wang Junfeng
- Website: https://www.kingandwood.com

King and Wood (Chinese: 金杜律师事务所) is an international law firm based in China and one of China's leading law firms. It has offices in 6 jurisdictions with over 2,000 lawyers. It was originally founded in 1993. From 2012 until 2026, King & Wood was part of a combination with Mallesons, called King & Wood Mallesons. From March 2026, following a mutually agreed separation, the firm resumed operating under the independent "King & Wood" brand.

== History ==
=== Founding ===
King & Wood was among the first law firms established in the People's Republic of China during the modern era. It was founded in April 1993 by Wang Junfeng and other partners who had previously worked at the state-sponsored China Council for the Promotion of International Trade (CCPIT). The firm's establishment was made possible when the central government permitted private ownership of law firms. Wang Junfeng subsequently became the firm's Global Chairman and is widely credited as its principal architect.

King & Wood was notably the first Chinese law firm to adopt the lockstep partnership compensation system, under which partner remuneration is tied primarily to seniority. The firm retained a flexible range of point adjustments to accommodate fluctuations in partners' individual performance. By 2000, it had become one of Beijing's "Big Four" domestic firms alongside Haiwen & Partners, Jingtian & Gongcheng, and Fangda Partners.

The firm opened its first out-of-Beijing offices in Shanghai and Shenzhen (1995), followed by Chengdu (1998) and Guangzhou (2002). Unlike competitors who acquired existing local firms, King & Wood pursued an integrated model: transferring Beijing partners to new cities and requiring incoming local partners to undergo training at its Beijing headquarters to absorb the firm's culture before taking up their local roles.

=== Domestic expansion ===
King & Wood's domestic expansion proceeded in two distinct phases. In the first phase, between 1995 and 2002, King & Wood opened offices in Shanghai and Shenzhen (1995), Chengdu (1998), and Guangzhou (2002). A second wave of expansion between 2006 and 2009 saw the firm establish offices in Chongqing, Hangzhou, Xi'an, Tianjin, Qingdao, Suzhou, Jinan, and Hong Kong.

By the late 2000s, the firm counted major corporate clients including Citigroup, China Life, Walmart, PetroChina, Bank of China, and the Beijing Organizing Committee for the Olympic Games for the 2008 Summer Olympics. King & Wood advised on PetroChina's initial public offering — the largest IPO in Chinese history at the time, which briefly took the company's market capitalisation above US$1 trillion.

Prior to merging with Mallesons Stephen Jaques, King & Wood maintained an alliance with Australian law firm Gilbert + Tobin.

=== Formation of King & Wood Mallesons ===
King & Wood merged with the Australian firm Mallesons Stephen Jaques on 1 March 2012 to form King & Wood Mallesons (KWM). The combined firm adopted a Swiss verein structure, creating three financially independent partnerships in Mainland China, Australia, and Hong Kong. Wang Junfeng stated at the time that a primary objective for the Chinese partnership was to gain management experience and develop King & Wood into a global brand rather than to maximise short-term profit.

In 2013, KWM expanded further by merging with London-based SJ Berwin, a member of the UK "Silver Circle" of elite law firms. At its peak, KWM was the largest international commercial law firm based in the Asia-Pacific.

=== Separation and re-establishment ===
In December 2025, KWM announced that their Chinese and Australian partnership would formally separate on 31 March 2026, with the two businesses reverting to their pre-merger brands of "King & Wood" for China and "Mallesons" for Australia.

Following the split, King & Wood retained offices in China, Hong Kong, Japan, Canada, and the United States, while Mallesons had retained KWM's offices in Australia and Singapore.

== Practice areas ==
King & Wood advises on a broad range of practice areas, with a focus on cross-border transactions and Chinese regulatory matters. Its core practice areas include:

- Banking and finance
- Compliance & regulatory
- Corporate, Mergers & Acquisitions
- Capital markets and securities
- Digital economy
- Dispute resolution and Litigation
- Family Wealth Management and Inheritance
- Insurance
- International Projects
- Labour & Employment
- Private Equity & Funds
- Restructuring & Insolvency
- Strategic M&A and Restructuring
- Tax
- Intellectual property

The firm has historically served both multinational corporations investing into China and Chinese enterprises expanding internationally.

== See also ==
- King & Wood Mallesons
- Mallesons
- Red Circle (law firms)
- List of largest law firms by revenue
