= Tim Faulkner =

Australian judge

The Honourable Justice Tim Faulkner

Judge of the New South Wales Supreme Court
- Incumbent
- Assumed office 23 May 2024
- Nominated by: Michael Daley
- Appointed by: Margaret Beazley

Personal details
- Born: 1966 (age 59–60) Canberra, Australian Capital Territory
- Spouse: Liz
- Children: Three
- Education: Australian National University (BEc, LLB); University of Sydney (LLM)
- Occupation: Judge, barrister

Tim Faulkner (born 1966) is a judge of the Supreme Court of New South Wales, the highest court in the State of New South Wales, Australia, which forms part of the Australian court hierarchy.

== Education ==
Faulkner was born in Canberra, Australian Capital Territory in 1966 to June, a homemaker, and Donald, an astrophysicist. He attended Canberra High School and Walker College. He then attended the Australian National University where he graduated with degrees in economics and law. In 1995, Faulkner graduated with a Master of Laws from the University of Sydney.

== Career ==
Faulkner was admitted as a solicitor in 1990. He started his career at Mallesons working under Julie Ward (now President of the New South Wales Court of Appeal) and Ashley Black (now a judge of the Supreme Court of New South Wales). He then practised in London at Herbert Smith before being called to the bar of New South Wales in 1999. He practised as a barrister from 12 Wentworth Chambers in Sydney, where he gained particular expertise in insurance law, professional negligence, and matters concerning the Australian Securities and Investments Commission. Faulkner took silk in 2014.

Faulkner's appointment to the bench of the Supreme Court of New South Wales was announced by NSW Attorney General Michael Daley on 2 May 2024. He was sworn as a judge on 23 May 2024. Faulkner sits in the Common Law Division of the Court.

== Personal life ==
Faulkner is married to Liz and has three children.

== See also ==
- Supreme Court of New South Wales
