= Moira Rayner =

Australian-based human rights barrister (born 1948)

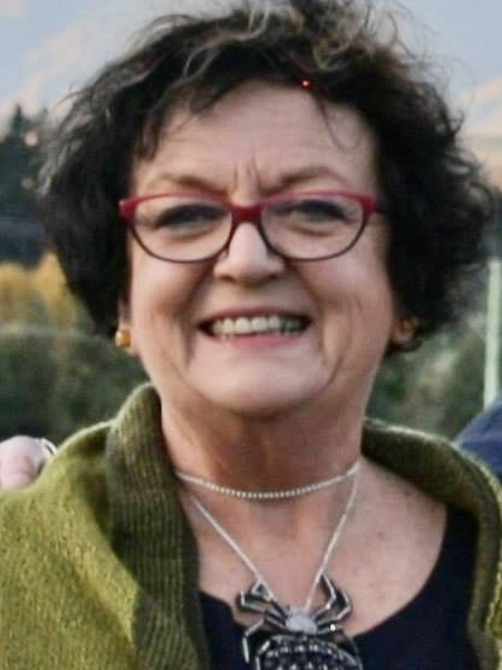
- Born: Moira Emilie Stockwell; 10 November 1948 (age 77); New Zealand
- Education: University of Western Australia
- Writing career
- Genres: Public Policy, Social Justice
- Website: www.moirarayner.com.au

Moira Emilie Rayner (née Stockwell, born 10 November 1948), is a New Zealand-born, Australian-based barrister and human rights advocate.

In 1986, she was appointed a Commissioner of the Law Reform Commission of Western Australia, a position she held until 1990.

In 1990 she was appointed the third Commissioner for Equal Opportunity appointed by the Government of Victoria under the Equal Opportunity Act 1984, an office which she held until 1994. In this position she was responsible for monitoring the Equal Opportunity Act; the Racial Discrimination Act 1975, the Human Rights and Equal Opportunity Commission Act 1986, and the Commonwealth legislated Sex Discrimination Act 1984.

In 1994 the Australian Federal Government appointed her to the Institute of Family Studies to undertake a special project to fight child abuse.

In 2000 Rayner became the first Director of the office of Children's Rights Commissioner for the city of London, UK.

Rayner used her time in her official positions, and as an author and activist, to address issues and support campaigns for the rights of women in society and the rights of children in the legal system. Many of her activities in these spheres have been innovative and thus publicly and politically controversial.

== Early life and education ==
Rayner is a great-granddaughter of the New Zealand politician and Minister for Native Affairs, John Bryce. She was born in Dunedin, New Zealand into an observant Protestant family, the second of three children. She completed her primary and secondary education at Columba College, Dunedin, and at the age of sixteen her family moved to Western Australia, where she began her study of law.

Having graduated with honours in law from the University of Western Australia, Rayner was admitted to the Bar in 1972 and, at age 27, established her own legal firm. She also practised as a solicitor advocate in Perth from 1975. As a barrister she joined the Independent Western Australian Bar Association in 1985.

== Career ==
In 1986 she was appointed a Commissioner of the Law Reform Commission of Western Australia a position she held until 1990. In 1987 she completed a Churchill Fellowship on the rights of children in the legal system of the United Kingdom. In 1988 she was elected Chairman of the Law Reform Commission of Western Australia.

From 1990 until 1994 Rayner held the office of Victorian Commissioner for Equal Opportunity in Victoria, the body responsible for monitoring the application of the Equal Opportunity Act 1984; Racial Discrimination Act 1975, and the Human Rights and Equal Opportunity Commission Act 1986., and the Commonwealth legislated Sex Discrimination Act 1984.

In a 1994 dispute with the newly elected government led by Jeff Kennett regarding Rayner's stance against the closure of women's prisons in Victoria, the Act was amended and the office of Commissioner was abolished. Later in 1994 the Australian Federal government appointed her to the Institute of Family Studies to undertake a special project to fight child abuse.

Rayner then joined the national law firm Dunhill Madden Butler where she practised industrial, workplace relations and discrimination law for seven years (1994-2001). Until 2000 Rayner chaired both the Financial Planning Association's independent Dispute Resolution Scheme, and the Board of Directors of the National Children's and Youth Law Centre Inc.

In 2000, Rayner moved to London to work with the Lord Mayor of London Authority, as the founding Director of the independently funded Office of the Children's Rights Commissioner for London implementing provisions of United Nations Convention on the Rights of the Child (2003).

Rayner resigned as Acting Commissioner of the Corruption and Crime Commission of Western Australia amid an accusation of corruption of which she was later acquitted. She had warned a dying friend that he should be careful what he said on the phone as authorities could be listening. The jury judged it to be a "slip of the tongue", made in a moment of distress without criminal intent. In reply to a question by ABC journalist Rachael Kohn, Rayner described the incident.

I was (falsely) accused of acting with the corrupt intention of perverting the course of justice, by visiting a long-term friend of mine who was dying in a hospice. He had been found to have been stealing from the parliament and to have been using drugs, which were totally out of character.

Other appointments have included

- University of Melbourne (Advisory Board Labour Law Centre; Senior Fellow),
- Deakin University (Adjunct Professor, Centre for Human Services),
- RMIT University (Adjunct Professor, School of Social Inquiry);
- Murdoch University (Visiting Scholar),
- University of Western Australia (Lecturer, Senior Fellow Law School, Visiting Fellow at the Australian Centre)
- Curtin University (Lecturer)
- Australian Institute of Family Studies (deputy director, Research).

For the last fifteen years Rayner has been a prolific commentator in the online current affairs periodical New Matilda. Articles include analyses of animal rights, indigenous policy, human rights, funeral celebrancy and the Australian Competition & Consumer Commission, the London bombing attacks, and Michael Jackson’s victims. In Eureka Street she wrote defending Victorian Police Commissioner Christine Nixon.

== Spiritual journey ==
Rayner was raised in a very observant Presbyterian family in which she claims to have been influenced to believe in high ideals of justice and fairness. Later on she explored various forms of religious belief. She was particularly influenced by the early spiritual teaching of Bhagwan Shree Rajneesh (later known as 'Osho') known as the Orange People and their deep focus on meditation. She spent time in the Rajneesh community in Pune, India and in Oregon in the USA . In recent years she has become deeply influenced by the Spiritual Exercises of Saint Ignatius of Loyola. As a member of the teaching team at the Campion Centre of Ignatian Spirituality in Kew, Victoria, she guides persons in the Spiritual Exercises.

== Published works ==
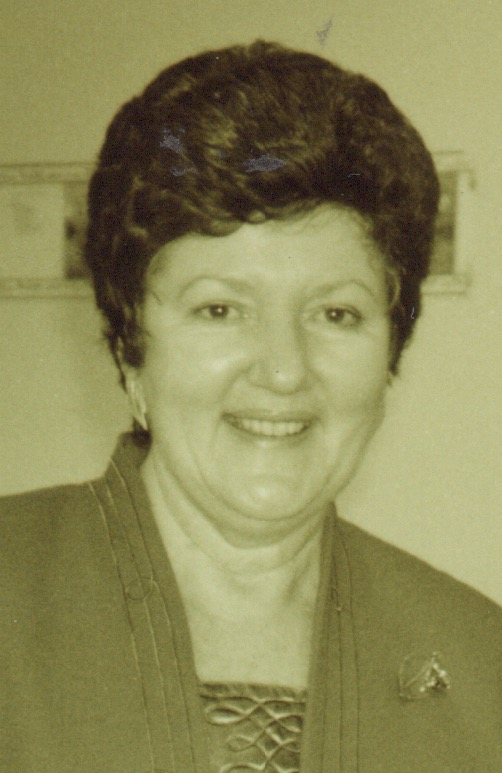
Joan Kirner, first female Premier of Victoria, Australia, from 1990 to 1992

Rooting Democracy: Growing the Society We Want (with Jenny Lee)

The book explains that democracy can only flourish with visible accountable government. Of particular importance are the safeguards for the less visible - and thus more vulnerable - institutions, such as public prosecutors, human rights commissions, the independence of the judiciary and public service, Freedom of Information (FOI), ombudsmen and other "watchdogs" which provide the checks and balances vital to democracy.

The Women's Power Handbook (with Joan Kirner, former Premier of Victoria).

The content consists of advice to those women who would be community activists, politicians or senior executives. It advises one how to attain power and use it to advantage society. Inter alia, it describes how to forge alliances with like-minded women, how to discuss tactics for managing meetings, and how to use the media.
