= Stephen family =

The Stephen family is a prominent legal dynasty in Australia that has produced a number of judges and jurists. Members include:

- John Stephen (1771–1833), commissioner of the Courts of Requests in New South Wales, solicitor-general, judge of the Supreme Court of New South Wales.
- Sidney Stephen (1797–1858), son of John (1771–1833), a puisne judge of the Supreme Court of New Zealand.
- John Stephen, (1798–1854), son of John, alderman for the City of Melbourne.
- Sir Alfred Stephen KCMG CB (1802–1894), son of John (1771–1833), Lieutenant-Governor of NSW and Chief Justice of NSW.
- Francis Pasmore Stephen (1804–1837), son of John (1771–1833), solicitor in Sydney, and proprietor of the Australian newspaper.
- George Milner Stephen (1812–1894), son of John (1771–1833), advocate-general and crown solicitor in South Australia in 1838.
- Francis John Sidney (Frank) Stephen (1822–1895), solicitor to the Melbourne City Council.
- James Wilberforce Stephen (1822–1881), judge of the Victorian Supreme Court.
- Montagu Stephen (1827–1872), son of Alfred, Solicitor, member for Canterbury in the New South Wales Legislative Assembly.
- Sir Henry Stephen (1828–1920), son of Alfred, politician and Puisne Judge of the Supreme Court of New South Wales.
- Edward Milner Stephen (1834–1894), son of Alfred.
- Harold Stephen (1841–1889), son of George Milner, member for Monaro."death of Mr Harold Stephen". The Sydney Morning Herald. 2 December 1889. p. 7 – via National Library of Australia.
- Cecil Bedford Stephen K.C. (died 1910), sixth son and associate of Alfred.
- Septimus Stephen (1842–1901), seventh son of Alfred, founder of the law firm Stephen, Jaques and Stephen.
- Robert Campbell Stephen (1867–1947), son of Septimus, Brigadier-general in the British Army.
- Edward Milner Stephen (1870–1939) son of Edward Milner, NSW supreme court judge 1929–1939.
- Sir Colin Campbell Stephen (1872–1937) son of Septimus, joined his father's lawfirm Stephen, Jaques and Stephen.
- Adrian Consett Stephen MC (1894–1918), son of Consett, grandson of Montague, awarded the Croix de Guerre at the Somme and the Military Cross at Passchendaele before being killed in action in Ypres.
- Sir George Stephen QC (1794 – 20 June 1879) was a British solicitor, barrister, author and anti-slavery proponent, practiced at the Victorian Bar, father of James Wilberforce Stephen and nephew of John Stephen.

Sir Ninian Stephen, a Justice in the High Court and Governor-General of Australia does not appear to have been related.

== See also ==
- Political families of Australia
