= Stephen Free =

Australian judge

The Honourable Justice Stephen Free

Judge of the New South Wales Court of Appeal
- Incumbent
- Assumed office 12 May 2025
- Nominated by: Michael Daley
- Appointed by: Margaret Beazley

Personal details
- Parent: Ross Free (father)
- Education: Springwood High School
- Alma mater: Australian National University (BA, LLB); Magdalen College, Oxford (BCL, MPhil)
- Occupation: Judge, barrister

Stephen John Free is a judge of the New South Wales Court of Appeal, the highest court in the State of New South Wales, Australia, which forms part of the Australian court hierarchy.

== Early life and education ==
Free was born in the Blue Mountains region of New South Wales to Ross and Jennifer. Free's father, Ross, was a minister in the Hawke and Keating governments and served in the Parliament of Australia as the Federal Member of Parliament for Macquarie and Lindsay.

Free attended Springwood High School, where he ranked first in the state in the Higher School Certificate, achieving a perfect score in the Universities Admission Index. He then enrolled at the Australian National University, where he graduated with the University Medal in both arts and law. Free was later awarded a Commonwealth Scholarship to attend Magdalen College, Oxford, where he read for a Bachelor of Civil Law and a Master of Philosophy in law. In 2000, Free was awarded the Vinerian Scholarship for "best performance in the examination for the degree of Bachelor of Civil Law".

== Career ==
Following his return from Oxford, Free was admitted as a solicitor and commenced practice at Mallesons in Sydney. He later joined the Crown Solicitor's Office. Free was called to the bar in 2006 and commenced practice as a barrister at Eleven Wentworth. He practised primarily in the areas of constitutional law, commercial law and administrative law. He was appointed senior counsel in 2018.

During his time as a barrister, Free acted in several Royal Commissions. He was counsel assisting the Royal Commission into Institutional Responses to Child Sexual Abuse and was also instructed in the Royal Commissions into Defence and Veterans Suicide, and into Aged Care Quality and Safety. He acted for the Independent Commission Against Corruption in the Court of Appeal in proceedings against former Premier of New South Wales, Gladys Berejiklian. He also acted for Australian Guantanamo Bay detainee David Hicks in proceedings against the Commonwealth Director of Public Prosecutions concerning the publication of Hicks' memoirs, Guantanamo: My Journey. Free also served as a member of Football Australia's appeals, disciplinary and ethics committees.

Free was nominated by Attorney General of New South Wales Michael Daley as a judge of the Supreme Court of New South Wales and as a judge of appeal on 2 April 2025. He was sworn in as a judge on 12 May 2025. In 2025, Free joined with Chief Justice Bell and President Ward to reject a challenge brought by old boys of Newington College concerning the school's move to co-education. Later that year, Free joined with the Chief Justice and Chief Judge at Common Law Ian Harrison to reject an appeal from the Palestine Action Network concerning its application to hold a protest regarding the Gaza war at the Sydney Opera House.

== Personal life ==
Free is married to Kim, who he met while a student at the University of Oxford. They have two children. Free is a supporter of the Penrith Panthers in the National Rugby League.

== See also ==
- Supreme Court of New South Wales
