= Colin Stephen =

Australian solicitor and horseman (1872–1937)

Sir Colin Campbell Stephen (3 May 1872 – 14 September 1937) was an Australian lawyer remembered as the longtime chairman of the Australian Jockey Club (AJC).

== History ==
He was a member of the well-known Stephen family, a son of Septimus Alfred Stephen, MLC. He was educated at All Saints' College, Bathurst and, after a course of private tuition in England, was admitted as a solicitor in 1896, and was accepted as a partner in the firm of Stephen, Jaques and Stephen.

He was elected a member of the AJC in 1892, and the committee in 1912, serving on the Sir Adrian Knox sub-committee which framed the rules of racing of that year. In 1933 he was tasked with formulating a set of revised rules of racing to be adopted throughout Australia. He was appointed chairman of the AJC on 24 October 1939, succeeding Adrian Knox, who resigned following his appointment as Chief Justice of the High Court of Australia, succeeding Samuel Griffith.

Stephen was a successful rider and owner; his racing colours were pale blue with a white cap. His horses included Fidelity, who won the Ascot Vale Stakes in 1936, and Caesar, who took the 1937 race from Ajax.

== Recognition ==
Stephen was knighted in the New Year's 1935 honours list.

The AJC Spring Stakes race was renamed Colin Stephen Quality Handicap in 1938.

== Family ==
In 1899 he married Dorothy Knox (died 1935), daughter of Edward W. Knox (died 26 June 1933), managing director of CSR on 26 October 1899. They had a home "Llanillo", Bellevue Hill. Their children included:

- Alastair Edward Stephen (27 May 1901 – 4 August 1982) was also a lawyer. On 10 June 1942 he married Diana Allen, who died on 4 July 1943. He then married Winifred Grace Bonnin of Adelaide, who survived him.
- Helen Roslyn Stephen (30 November 1903 – 28 May 1991) married Colonel Thomas L. F. Rutledge on 29 October 1935. She was the author of My Grandfather's House (1986).
- Philippa Stephen (11 February 1907 – ) married Denis Allen on 20 February 1943

Noel Campbell Stephen (c. 1878 – 26 February 1937) was a brother
