= Manon Schick =

Swiss chief executive officer

Manon Schick (born December 25, 1974, in Lausanne) is a Swiss-German journalist and human rights activist. From 2011 to 2020 she was managing director of the Swiss section of Amnesty International.

== Biography ==
Manon Schick grew up in Lausanne. When she was young she became interested in journalism. At the age of 14, the French-speaking radio host Jean-Marc Richard made her entry into journalism – she became a presenter at the Lausanne broadcaster Radio Acidule. In 1997 she completed her journalistic internship at the weekly magazine L'Illustré. She then began studying humanities at the University of Lausanne. the apartheid press reports in South Africa was one of the main reasons she became interested in human rights over there and took part for their defense.

== Career ==
Schick has been involved with Amnesty International since she was 22 years old. In 1995 she joined the organization as a volunteer. In 2003, she traveled to Colombia with Peace Brigades International and accompanied local human rights groups in her work. In 2004 she became media spokeswoman for the Swiss section of Amnesty International, succeeding Catherine Morand. Three years later, she became head of media and lobbying.

In 2011, Manon Schick succeeds Daniel Bolomey and took over the management of Amnesty International of Switzerland. She continues Explanatory's work and sets new priorities, such as migration, asylum and corporate responsibility, where she also faces controversial political debates.

In March 2017 she published a book Mes héroïnes: Des femmes qui s'engagent. These are portraits of eleven activists in the field of human rights.

== See also ==
- Amnesty International
- Swiss association
