= Julia Lonergan =

Australian judge (born 1961)

The Honourable Justice Julia Lonergan

Judge of the Supreme Court of New South Wales
- Incumbent
- Assumed office 21 March 2017
- Nominated by: Mark Speakman
- Appointed by: General David Hurley

Personal details
- Born: 14 January 1961 (age 65) Sydney, Australia
- Education: Loreto Kirribilli; Macquarie University; University of Sydney
- Profession: Judge, lawyer

Julia Lily Ann Lonergan (born 14 January 1961) is an Australian judge who was appointed to the Supreme Court of New South Wales in March 2017.

Lonergan was born in Sydney and educated at St Patrick's Parramatta and Loreto Kirribilli. She then studied a Bachelor of Arts at Macquarie University and a Bachelor of Laws at the University of Sydney before being admitted to practice as a solicitor in 1983. She began working at her parents' firm, T P and J Lonergan in Parramatta. She then worked for GIO, specialising in insurance litigation, later moving to Suncorp Metway.

Lonergan was admitted as a barrister in 1997, and developed a practice in medical negligence, personal injury and professional negligence, becoming known as an expert in medical negligence. She appeared as a junior barrister for the plaintiff in Simpson v Diamond, which resulted in the highest medical negligence verdict in New South Wales history, leading to changes in the legislation relating to civil liability. Lonergan attained senior counsel status in 2012. From 2013 to 2014, she was counsel assisting a Special Commission of Inquiry into child sex abuse allegations in the Roman Catholic Diocese of Maitland-Newcastle. She was elected to the Council of the NSW Bar Association for 2016 in a result that helped block a conservative effort to oust the incumbent members. Lonergan has served on the equal opportunity committees of both the Law Council of Australia and the New South Wales Bar Association.

Lonergan was appointed to the Supreme Court by Attorney-General Mark Speakman with effect from 21 March 2017, filling the vacancy caused by the elevation of Justice Richard White to the Court of Appeal.
