= Anthony McGrath =

Anthony McGrath may refer to:

- Anthony McGrath (cricketer) (born 1975), English cricketer and cricket coach
- Anthony McGrath (judge) (fl. 1980s–2020s), Australian judge
