= Anne Twomey =

Anne Twomey may refer to:

- Anne Twomey (academic), Australian legal scholar and lawyer
- Anne Twomey (actress) (born 1951), American actress
