= Peter Brereton =

Australian judge

The Honourable Justice Peter Brereton

Judge of the Supreme Court of New South Wales
- Incumbent
- Assumed office 6 February 2025
- Nominated by: Michael Daley
- Appointed by: Margaret Beazley

Personal details
- Education: University of Sydney (BEc, LLB); University of London
- Occupation: Judge, barrister, solicitor

Peter Brereton is an Australian judge who has served as a judge of the Equity Division of the Supreme Court of New South Wales since 2025.

== Early life and education ==
Brereton studied at the University of Sydney, where he graduated with degrees in arts and law, the latter with first class honours. He later undertook a master's degree at the University of London. Brereton also tutored at the University of London and the University of Sydney in the 1990s and later lectured at the University of Sydney from 2009 to 2018.

== Career ==
=== Solicitor ===
Brereton began his legal career in 1992 as a solicitor at Freehills (now Herbert Smith Freehills). He subsequently served as a judge's associate in the Federal Court of Australia, before joining Mallesons Stephen Jaques (now Mallesons) in 1994, where he remained until 1997.

=== Barrister ===
Brereton was called to the bar in 1997. He practised primarily in the fields of commercial law, competition and consumer law, technology law, media and telecommunications law, resources and energy, and financial services. He was appointed Senior Counsel in 2009.

During his time at the bar, Brereton appeared in a number of significant commercial matters. In 2011 he appeared for Metcash in Federal Court proceedings brought by the Australian Competition and Consumer Commission concerning Metcash's proposed acquisition of the Franklins supermarket chain. In 2014 he appeared for Caltex in proceedings in which the ACCC alleged that five petrol retailers had used their membership of the Informed Sources price information service to facilitate coordination in setting prices. In 2017 he appeared for Herbert Smith Freehills in proceedings against eight departing partners who had resigned to join White & Case. In 2023 he appeared for Hancock Prospecting in the Supreme Court of Western Australia in litigation concerning royalties from the Hope Downs iron ore tenements.

From 2007, Brereton served on the Advisory Committee for the Australian Law Reform Commission. He was a member of the Council of Law Reporting for NSW from 2008 to 2015, serving as its chairman from 2012 to 2015. From 2022 he was a member of the Legal Profession Admission Board.

== Judicial career ==
On 20 November 2024, Attorney General of New South Wales Michael Daley nominated Brereton as a judge of the Supreme Court of New South Wales. He was sworn in on 6 February 2025.

== Personal life ==
Brereton is married to Linda, who he met at university. They have three children.

== See also ==
- Supreme Court of New South Wales
- List of judges of the Supreme Court of New South Wales
