= Trish Henry =

Australian judge

The Honourable Trish Henry

Judge of the New South Wales Supreme Court
- In office 30 January 2019 – 1 February 2024
- Nominated by: Mark Speakman
- Appointed by: General David Hurley

Personal details
- Spouse: Stephen Gorry
- Education: Wenona School
- Alma mater: University of New South Wales
- Occupation: Judge, solicitor

Patricia (Trish) Anne Henry was a judge of the Supreme Court of New South Wales and a competition law partner at Mallesons.

== Early life and education ==
Henry was educated at Wenona School in the North Shore of Sydney. She later attended the University of New South Wales where she graduated with degrees in arts and law.

== Career ==
Henry was admitted as a solicitor in 1998 and commenced practice at in Perth with Stephen Jaques Stone James, a predecessor firm of Mallesons. Henry later moved to London where she worked at Baker McKenzie, before returning to Mallesons in Sydney where she became a partner in 1997. Henry's practice as a solicitor focused on competition and consumer law, commercial litigation and communications law.

Henry was sworn in as a judge of the Supreme Court of New South Wales on 30 January 2019. She is one of the few solicitors to have been appointed directly to the bench without having first been a barrister. Henry retired from the Court in February 2024. Following her retirement, she was appointed by Woolworths as its Independent Code Mediator under the Australian Food and Grocery Industry Code.

== Personal life ==
Henry is married to Stephen Gorry and has two children.

== See also ==
- Supreme Court of New South Wales
- Mallesons
