= Child Rights Taskforce – Australia =

The Child Rights Taskforce, convened by UNICEF Australia, is a child rights body made up of almost 100 organizations, advocating for the protection of child rights in Australia. Its goal is to lead the sector-wide approach to the UN in relation to policy for the protection of children.

The Australian Child Rights Taskforce is composed of advocates, service providers, individuals and experts with the goal of enhancing child protections and rights in Australia. It meets regularly to discuss upcoming opportunities and events to promote and protect child rights in Australia. One of the main roles of the Taskforce is to review Australian government policy in relation to its commitment to the UN Convention on the Rights of the Child (CRC).

== Members ==
The following organizations are given leadership roles as members of the "steering committee" of the coalition:

- Australian Youth Affairs Coalition
- Child Fund Australia
- Australian Association of Adolescent Health
- Youth Law Australia
- Reset.Tech
- Save the Children Australia / 54 Reasons
- SNAICC National Voice for our Children
- UNICEF Australia

== Reporting to the UN ==
Ratified in 1990, through the CRC, the government committed to making sure that every child in Australia is afforded every right in the UNCRC. Progress is monitored by the UN Committee on the Rights of the Child, a panel of independent experts the Australian Government reports to every five years.

The Australian Child Rights Taskforce is also given the opportunity to submit an independent report to ensure the UN is properly informed.

== Current Progress ==
In 2005, 2011 and 2018 the Child Rights Taskforce published reports, compiling data from consultations with children and youth, and organizations that work with children and child rights experts. In the most recent reports, it found that while Australia is a mostly positive place for most children, but shortfalls exist within existing systems, with some children still missing out as a result of the failure of governments to act and protect.

Despite Australia’s ratification of the CRC in 1990, Australia has yet to effectively incorporate human rights into policy and legislative framework to benefit children and there are unacceptable gaps in the legal protection of children’s rights. Some groups of children are especially disadvantaged by the failure of governments: • Aboriginal and Torres Strait Islander children have child mortality rates of three times their non-aboriginal peers and are the least consulted in Australian policy; they Aboriginal children aged 10–17 are around 24 times more likely to be jailed than non-Aboriginal children and Aboriginal children are about 10 times more likely to be in out-of-home care. • The numbers of children in out-of-home-care has increased significantly since 2005, yet Australia collects no consistent data on the reasons why children are placed in care; The reports acknowledge that there is often some progress. Developments have included: National Early Childhood Development Strategy, several iterations of a National Framework for Protecting Australia’s Children, the ongoing Plan to Reduce Violence against Women and their Children, and at least public commitments to Closing the Gap on Aboriginal health and education. At the end of the process of consultation, writing and editing, many organisations and individuals endorse the Report. It often becomes a key reference document to challenge the Australian Government on support for children including when it speaks at the UN.

The report offers a valuable comparison with the Australian Government's own reporting on its implementation of the Convention on the Rights of the Child.

It writes about Australia's legal and administrative implementation of the convention, and on whether the implementation has been effective. An example of its conclusions is as follows:

=== Legislation ===
The convention on the Rights of the Child creates international benchmarks for child rights. However, because the convention is not fully integrated into Australian law, there are no enforceable remedies for many child rights violations in Australia.

=== Coordination ===
Under current Australian federal systems, responsibility for many children’s rights, such as education, child protection and juvenile justice are within state jurisdictions. Because the UN Convention is not the underlying framework, state policies are inconsistent. For example, Queensland detains children over the age of 17 in adult facilities – in contravention of international law. A proposed solution is the implementation of a national plan of action to ensure states and territories meet international obligations.

=== Consultation ===
Mechanisms for involving children in decision-making in Australia are currently lacking. Finding out what makes a good school, to understanding the special needs of indigenous, rural, or refugee children, or children with a disability or in out-of home care; Australia does not follow best practice for finding out and incorporating the views of children. Where legislation does require children to participate in the decisions made about them, there tends to be no evaluation of how effectively this is achieved. Australia needs to learn more from examples of best practice for children’s participation and implement these mechanisms across public policy.

=== Limitations of Public Knowledge ===
Public knowledge in Australia oftentimes does not include child rights and abuse. Information about the different reasons for children living in out-of-home-care, suicide or attempted suicide in children and youth are mostly underreported. Australia does not currently have nationally consistent data on indigenous communities and children.

A suggested solution to begin creating and implementing policies and systems that help children includes providing more information on children's health, wellbeing, experiences and opinions.
