= Stanley Berwin =

English solicitor

Stanley Jack Berwin (19 March 1926 – 2 July 1988) was an English solicitor. He was the founder and name partner of two leading law firms in the City of London, Berwin & Co (now part of Berwin Leighton Paisner) and SJ Berwin (now part of King & Wood Mallesons). He was considered to be one of the leading lawyers of the second half of the 20th century.

== Early life ==
Berwin was born in Leeds, into an Orthodox Jewish family. His brother Malcolm entered the family tailoring business, Berwin & Berwin; his nephew Paul Berwin founded Yorkshire law firm Berwins.

He was educated at Roundhay School in Leeds. After serving in the Royal Navy in the Second World War, he studied at St. John's College, Cambridge, and the University of Leeds. While a law student at Leeds, he contested Wakefield for the Liberal Party in the 1950 general election, coming a distant third with 10% of the votes. At the 1951 General Election he contested Shipley for the Liberals and again finished a poor third.

== Career ==
Berwin became a solicitor, taking his articles at a firm in the City of London and then practising as a commercial lawyer at Herbert Oppenheimer, Nathan & Vandyke.

He founded Berwin & Co in the mid-1960s. The firm specialised in corporate finance, mergers and acquisitions, and tax. Berwin & Co merged with Leighton & Co in 1970 to form Berwin Leighton, and moved to Adelaide House on the north bank of the River Thames beside London Bridge. Berwin Leighton merged with Paisner & Co in 2001 to form Berwin Leighton Paisner.

In addition to his legal practice, Berwin held various positions in the City of London. He became a director at the merchant bank N M Rothschild & Sons in 1966, was a deputy chairman at British Land, and a director of Wickes.

After a period working outside the law, Berwin set up a new law firm, SJ Berwin, in 1982. He remained the senior partner until his death in 1988. The firm merged with King & Wood Mallesons in 2013.

The SJ Berwin Chair of Corporate Law at Cambridge University was endowed in his honour; the fundraising was so successful that a second innominate chair was also endowed at the same time.
