= Anna Mitchelmore =

Australian judge

The Honourable Justice Anna Mitchelmore

Judge of the New South Wales Court of Appeal
- Incumbent
- Assumed office 28 March 2022
- Nominated by: Mark Speakman
- Appointed by: Margaret Beazley

Personal details
- Spouse: Dr Tung Vu
- Education: Loreto Kirribilli
- Alma mater: University of Sydney (BA, LLB)
- Occupation: Judge, barrister

Anna Mitchelmore is a judge of the New South Wales Court of Appeal, the highest court in the State of New South Wales, Australia, which forms part of the Australian court hierarchy.

== Early life and education ==
Mitchelmore grew up in Huntleys Point. She attended Santa Maria Del Monte Primary School before enrolling at Loreto Kirribilli. She later graduated with degrees in arts and law from the University of Sydney.

== Career ==
Mitchelmore commenced her legal career as a summer clerk at Mallesons Stephen Jaques (now Mallesons). In 2001, she served as a judicial associate to the Honourable Justice Michael McHugh of the High Court of Australia. She subsequently worked as an assistant adviser to the then-Attorney-General of Australia, Daryl Williams, before practising at Gilbert + Tobin in dispute resolution. In 2004, she took up the position of Counsel Assisting the Solicitor-General and Crown Advocate of New South Wales

She was called to the bar in 2004. In 2006, she joined the Sixth Floor of Wentworth and Selborne Chambers, where she developed a practice in administrative, constitutional, criminal law, local government and environmental law. She took silk in 2018.

In September 2021, Mitchelmore was appointed a commissioner of the Law Reform Commission of New South Wales. She is also an Advisory Committee Member of the Gilbert + Tobin Centre of Public Law at the Faculty of Law and Justice at the University of New South Wales.

== Judicial career ==
On 28 March 2022, Mitchelmore was sworn in as a judge of the Supreme Court of New South Wales and as a judge of the New South Wales Court of Appeal.

In April 2023, Mitchelmore dismissed challenges brought by two protesters who had been issued penalty notices for breaching public health orders during the COVID-19 pandemic. The plaintiffs, who had attended a Black Lives Matter rally and a transgender rights rally in Sydney in 2020, argued that the restrictions imposed an unjustified burden on the implied freedom of political communication under the Australian Constitution. Mitchelmore rejected their arguments and dismissed the cases.

In October 2025, Mitchelmore held that legislation introduced by the Minns government that empowered police to direct protesters to move away from places of worship was constitutionally invalid for breaching the implied freedom of political communication.

== Personal life ==
Mitchelmore is married to Dr Tung Vu. Her grandfather and father were both solicitors.

== See also ==
- Supreme Court of New South Wales
