= Kelly Rees =

Australian judge

The Honourable Justice Kelly Rees

Judge of the New South Wales Supreme Court
- Incumbent
- Assumed office 5 September 2018
- Nominated by: Mark Speakman
- Appointed by: General David Hurley

Personal details
- Born: Bellingen Valley, New South Wales
- Education: Bellingen High School
- Alma mater: University of New South Wales (BComm, LLB); University of Cambridge (LLM)
- Occupation: Judge, barrister

Kelly Anne Rees is an Australian judge. She has been a judge of the Supreme Court of New South Wales since 5 September 2018.

== Early life and education ==
Rees was raised on her family's cattle farm in the Bellingen Valley and was dux of Bellingen High School. She studied at the University of New South Wales, winning the Sir Kevin Ellis Prize for the best performance in the combined commerce and law degrees and graduating in 1991. She received a Master of Laws (First Class) from the University of Cambridge in 1995. Representing both universities in the World Universities Debating Championship, Rees ranked as the top Australian debater, and won the England and Wales Debating Championship. She later funded scholarships for the dux and best-performing female student of Bellingen High School.

== Career ==
Rees was admitted as a solicitor in 1992 and worked for Mallesons Stephen Jaques (now Mallesons) from 1992 to 1998 as senior associate in commercial disputes. She was seconded to London law firm Kingsley Napley from 1995 to 1996. She was admitted as a barrister in 1998 and was appointed senior counsel in 2012. She also served as chair of the Education Committee of the New South Wales Bar Association. Rees' appearances as a barrister included the Special Commission of Inquiry into Acute Care Services in New South Wales Public Hospitals (2008), Royal Commission into Institutional Responses to Child Sexual Abuse (2014) and Royal Commission into Misconduct in the Banking, Superannuation and Financial Services Industry (2018).
