= Richard Weeks White =

Australian judge (born 1954)

- Born: 22 November 1954 (age 70); Sydney, New South Wales, Australia
- Education: Newington College; University of Sydney
- Occupation: Judge
- Title: The Honourable Justice
- Spouse: Catherine
- Children: 3
- Parent: Dr Weeks White

Richard Weeks White (born 22 November 1954) is a judge of the Court of Appeal of the Supreme Court of New South Wales.

== Early life and education ==
White was born on 22 November 1954 in Sydney. He attended Newington College (1967–72). He graduated from the University of Sydney with First-Class Honours in Law (1977), and the University Medal.

== Career ==
In 1975 White was articled at Allen Allen and Hemsley to a partner, William Gummow, who went on to become a Justice of the High Court of Australia. From 1977 to 1978 White was an associate to Sir Nigel Bowen, the first Chief Justice of the Federal Court of Australia. White joined Stephen Jaques and Stephen (now King & Wood Mallesons) in 1979 and became a member of the firm in 1982.

In 1986, White was called to the NSW Bar and was appointed Senior Counsel in 1998.

In 2000 White was nominated as the New South Wales Bar Association's representative to the Board of the College of Law. During a four-year term he served as chair of the Finance and Administration Committee and was a member of the Practical Legal Training, Audit and Building Committees. White was one of the counsel assisting in the HIH Royal Commission. In 18 years at the bar he established an extensive commercial practice on the 7th floor of Wentworth Chambers.

White was appointed a judge of the Supreme Court of New South Wales in 2004. On 15 March 2017, he became a Judge of Appeal.
