= Joanne Cameron =

Australian judge

The Honourable Justice Joanne Margaret Cameron

Judge of the Supreme Court of Victoria
- In office 12 August 2014 – June 2020

Personal details
- Education: University of Melbourne
- Occupation: Judge, lawyer

Joanne Margaret Cameron was a judge of the Trial Division of the Supreme Court of Victoria, Australia, from 12 August 2014 to June 2020. She was previously a partner at Mallesons Stephen Jaques.

== Early life and education ==
Cameron studied at the University of Melbourne, graduating with a Bachelor of Arts in 1987 and a Bachelor of Laws in 1988.

== Career ==
Cameron worked as a solicitor at Mallesons Stephen Jaques (now King & Wood Mallesons), in complex commercial disputes, involving litigation covering contracts, competition and trade practices, banking, and finance. Cameron became a partner in 1999 and partner in Charge of the Melbourne office in 2009.

From 2007 Cameron was a member of the Board of Examiners, a body that determined whether an individual applicant met the requirements for admission as a legal practitioner in Victoria. In 2012 Cameron was a member of a committee appointed by the Chief Justice of Victoria to conduct a preliminary evaluation of applicants for Senior Counsel.

=== Supreme Court ===
Cameron was appointed to the Supreme Court of Victoria on 12 August 2014, one of a growing number of solicitors, particularly female, appointed to Australian superior courts. Chief Justice of the Federal Court James Allsop attributes the growing number of appointment of female solicitors to the shortage of women barristers aged 50–55, with women being just 10% of senior counsel and 20% of barristers.
