= William Henson (Australian politician) =

Australian politician

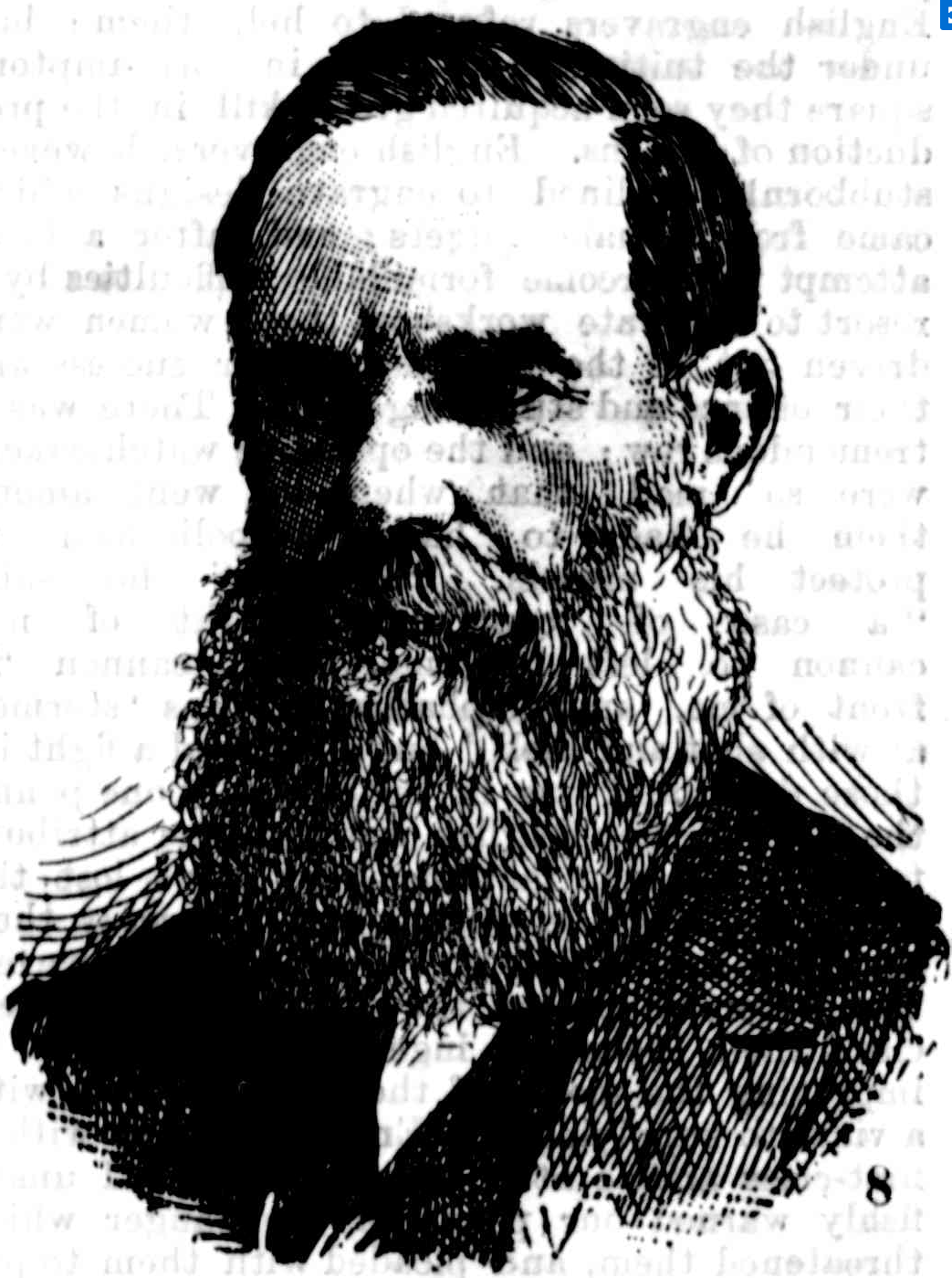
Mr William Henson MLA

William Henson (1 August 1826 – 19 March 1903) was a politician and gold miner in New South Wales, Australia.

== Early life ==
He was born in Sydney to soldier William Henson and Caroline Blades. His father was a soldier in the 3rd buffs who had been sent to New South Wales on detachment and remained, setting up business in George Street but dying while his children were still young. The younger William was educated at St Phillips School at Church Hill and then managed a sheep station. He spent time on the goldfields at Ophir and Bendigo, meeting with enough success to settle comfortably at Ashfield. He married Mary Ann Massey on 9 January 1855, and they had 4 daughters and 2 sons.

== Political career ==
In 1880 he was elected to the New South Wales Legislative Assembly for Canterbury. He was defeated in 1882, but returned in a by-election in 1885 and was re-elected in 1887. He did not contest the 1889 election, although he did run again, unsuccessfully, in 1891. He was a prominent member bf the order of the Sons of Temperance and of the Orange organisations, and as honorary treasurer of the Benevolent Society and President of the Local Option League.

== Death ==
Henson died at Ashfield on 19 March 1903 (aged 76).

New South Wales Legislative Assembly
Preceded by John Lucas; Sir Henry Parkes	Member for Canterbury; 1880–1882; Served alongside: William Pigott	Succeeded by Henry Moses; Septimus Stephen
Preceded by Henry Moses	Member for Canterbury; 1885–1889; With: Mark Hammond / William Davis; Septimus Stephen / Alexander Hutchison none / William Judd / Joseph Carruthers	Succeeded by John Wheeler; James Wilshire
