= Ashley John Black =

Australian judge

The Honourable Justice Ashley Black

Judge of the New South Wales Supreme Court
- Incumbent
- Assumed office 4 July 2011
- Nominated by: Brad Hazzard
- Appointed by: Dame Marie Bashir

Personal details
- Spouse: Leonie Black
- Education: Sydney Church of England Grammar School
- Alma mater: University of Sydney
- Occupation: Judge, lawyer

Ashley John Black is a judge of the Supreme Court of New South Wales, the highest court in the State of New South Wales, Australia, which forms part of the Australian court hierarchy. A noted authority on Australian corporate law, Black is the author of several textbooks on the subject, including Austin and Black's Annotated Corporations Act.

== Education ==
Black was educated at Sydney Church of England Grammar School before attending the University of Sydney, where he graduated with first class honours degrees in history and law. Black was a champion debater during his time at university, competing in competitions with Anthony Fisher, now the Catholic Archbishop of Sydney.

== Career ==
In 1988, Black served as judicial associate to Justice John Lockhart of the Federal Court of Australia. He then commenced practice as a solicitor at Mallesons in Sydney, where his supervising partner was Julie Ward, now President of the New South Wales Court of Appeal. Black was made a partner of Mallesons in 1995, where he acted for clients including Telstra, Hungry Jack's, GIO Insurance, Macquarie Group, National Australia Bank, Credit Suisse and UBS. Black served as Adjunct Professor at the University of Sydney and Visiting Fellow at the UNSW Faculty of Law and Justice of the University of New South Wales, where he taught postgraduate courses on financial services regulation, fiduciary duties, and conflicts of interest.

Black was appointed to the bench by NSW Attorney General Greg Smith directly from the partnership of Mallesons with effect from 4 July 2011.

== Selected works ==
- Austin, Robert; Black, Ashley (2025) Australian Corporations Legislation (LexisNexis, 2026 ed).
- Black, Ashley; Hanrahan, Pamela (2025) Securities and Financial Services Law (LexisNexis, 11th ed).
- — (2018) Contemporary Issues in Corporate and Competition Law: Essays in Honour of Professor Robert Baxt AO (LexisNexis).

== See also ==
- Supreme Court of New South Wales
- Sydney Law School
