= SJ Berwin =

Law firms of the United Kingdom

SJ Berwin LLP
- Headquarters: 10 Queen Street Place, London, United Kingdom
- Major practice areas: General practice
- Revenue: £184.6 million (2012/13)
- Profit per equity partner: £565,000 (2012/13)
- Date founded: 1982 (London)
- Company type: Limited liability partnership

SJ Berwin LLP was a multinational law firm headquartered in London, United Kingdom. SJ Berwin merged with the Hong Kong-headquartered law firm King & Wood Mallesons on 1 November 2013, becoming the fourth member of its Swiss Verein structure. SJ Berwin's legal name immediately changed to "King & Wood Mallesons LLP", although King & Wood Mallesons traded as "King & Wood Mallesons SJ Berwin" in Europe and the Middle East for a transitional period. SJ Berwin was a member of the "Silver Circle" of leading UK law firms. In January 2017, King & Wood Mallesons went into administration, which to that point was the biggest UK law firm collapse.

== History ==
SJ Berwin was founded in 1982 in London by lawyer Stanley J. Berwin along with 15 lawyers. It was driven forward by Berwin until his death in 1988, after which he was succeeded by Christopher Haan. In 1992, leadership of the firm was handed over to David Harrel, who led the firm for 13 years. Harrel oversaw SJ Berwin's strategy of European expansion. The management of the firm passed to fund formation partner Jonathan Blake in 2005, who took on the senior partner role alongside existing managing partner Ralph Cohen. During 2009 the firm opened three new offices in Hong Kong, Dubai and Shanghai. In 2010 Ralph Cohen stood down as Managing Partner and was replaced by Rob Day, who took office in November 2010.

SJ Berwin had abortive merger discussions with the American law firm Proskauer Rose in 2010. In 2013 the firm entered talks to join the Australian-Chinese law firm King & Wood Mallesons as its fourth constituent partnership. The merger was completed on 1 November 2013.

== Notable deals and cases ==
SJ Berwin advised Lion Capital LLP on a string of deals including the acquisition of fashion chain AllSaints from Icelandic banks Kaupthing and Glitnir in 2011, and the £1.4 billion acquisition of French frozen food business Picard Surgeles in 2010.

The firm acted for Graphite Capital on the £215 million sale of Kurt Geiger, Europe's largest luxury shoe retailer, to US retailer Jones Group.

The firm advised global packaging manufacturer Amcor in August 2009 on its offer of $2.025 billion to buy part of Alcan Packaging, a world leader in packaging belonging to Anglo-Australian mining group Rio Tinto.

In 2010 the firm advised British Land on forming a £2.13 billion joint venture with NYSE listed global asset manager The Blackstone Group for British Land's holdings in the Broadgate Estate, the premier 30-acre City of London office estate.

The firm advised SITA, the specialist in air transport communications and IT solutions, on a seven-year deal, valued in excess of $2 billion, to broaden its existing partnership with Orange Business Services.

The firm acted for OK! magazine in its dispute with Hello! over the publication of "spoiler" photographs of the wedding of Michael Douglas and Catherine Zeta-Jones.
