= Nye Perram =

Australian judge (born 1969)

The Honourable Justice Nye Perram

Judge of the Federal Court of Australia
- Incumbent
- Assumed office 8 August 2008

Personal details
- Born: 1969 (age 56–57)
- Profession: Judge

Nye Perram (born 1969) is an Australian judge. He has been a Judge of the Federal Court of Australia since his appointment in August 2008 at the age of 39. Prior to his appointment, Perram practised as a Senior Counsel in Sydney.

== Early life and education ==
Perram was educated at Sydney Boys High School and studied at the University of Sydney, where he was awarded a Bachelor of Arts majoring in English literature and pure mathematics and a Bachelor of Laws with honours. He later received a Bachelor of Civil Law from the University of Oxford.

== Legal career ==
Perram was admitted as a solicitor in 1992 (practising briefly with Mallesons Stephen Jaques) and then as a barrister before becoming Senior Counsel in 2006. While at the bar, Perram was a member of the New South Wales Bar Council.

He practised in a wide range of areas including constitutional and administrative law and commercial law. In addition to his Australian practice, Perram also represented the deposed former Prime Minister of Fiji, Laisenia Qarase, in legal proceedings before the High Court of Fiji concerning the legality of the coup staged by his military successor, Frank Bainimarama.

== Federal Court of Australia ==
Perram was appointed as a judge of the Federal Court of Australia in August 2008.

Since his appointment to the Federal Court, he has presided in a broad variety of cases concerning intellectual property, administrative and constitutional law, taxation, industrial and employment law and commercial law. He sits at both first instance and on appeal.

== Other roles ==
In addition to being a judge, Perram is also the President of the Copyright Tribunal of Australia and was formerly a Part-Time Commissioner with the Australian Law Reform Commission. He was one of the commissioners responsible for the Commission’s 2014 report Copyright and the Digital Economy. He was also formerly a Presidential Member of the Administrative Appeals Tribunal.

== Lectures ==
In 2024, Perram was invited to deliver the Sir Maurice Byers Oration and spoke on the topic of judicial review of statutes.

In 2025, he was invited to give the Margaret Stone Lecture, a joint initiative of the University of New South Wales and Herbert Smith Freehills, and spoke on the regulation of monopolies.
