= Corruption and Crime Commission =

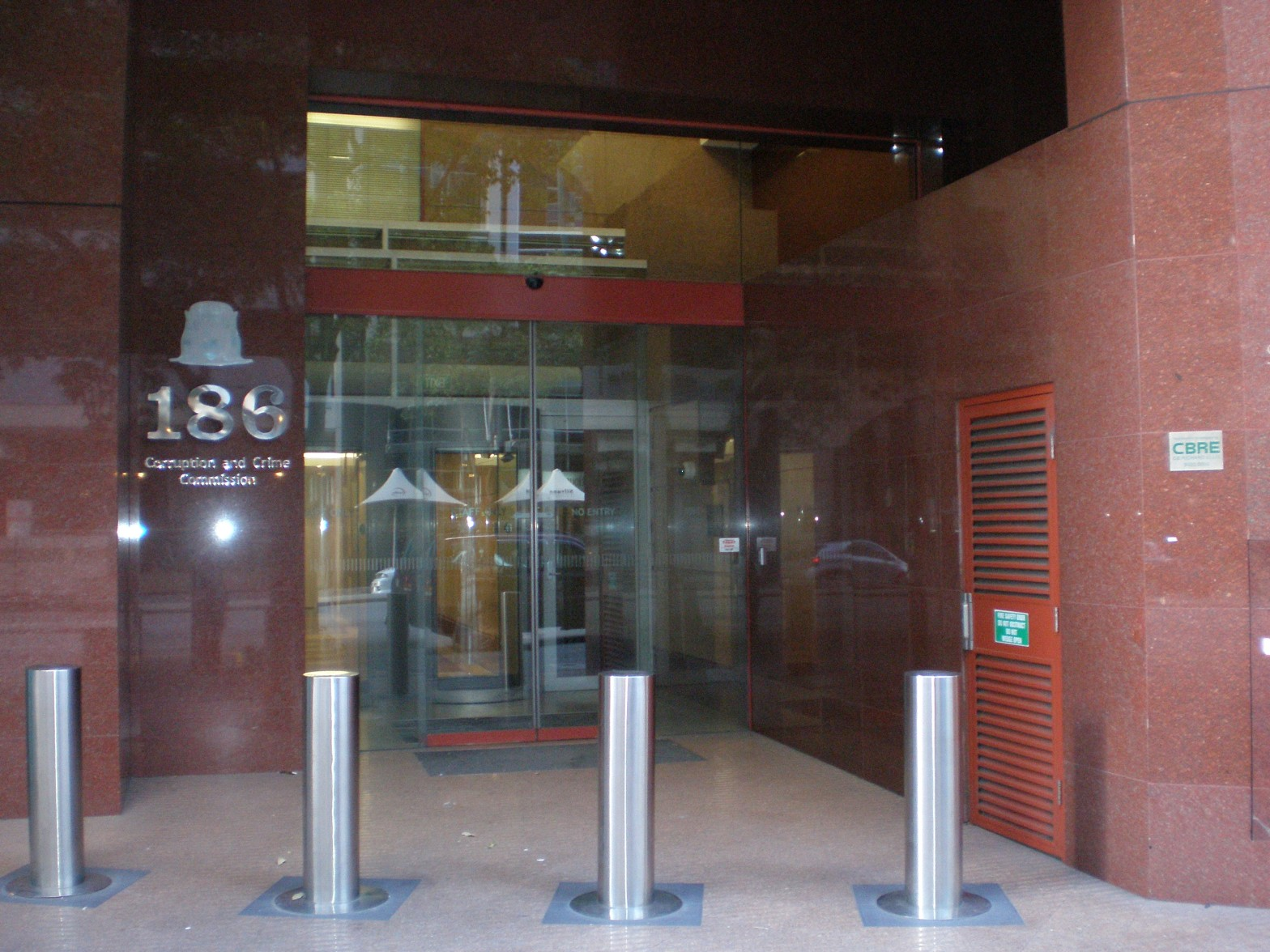
- Entrance to the office of the Corruption and Crime Commission in Northbridge (2007)

Commission overview
- Formed: 1 January 2004
- Jurisdiction: Western Australia
- Headquarters: Northbridge
- Employees: 125
- Commission executive: Michael Corboy, SC, Commissioner
- Website: ccc.wa.gov.au

The Corruption and Crime Commission is an independent anti-corruption integrity agency established on 1 January 2004 to improve the integrity of the Western Australian public sector and investigate allegations of misconduct against public officers. It took over from the Anti-Corruption Commission and has jurisdiction over all State Government departments, instrumentalities and boards as well as universities and local governments. This includes more than 148,000 employees in 278 public authorities, as of 2012.

Under the Corruption and Crime Commission Act 2003, the Commission has three main functions:

1. Prevention and Education function. Involves assisting public sector agencies to prevent, identify and deal with misconduct. This is done by running educational forums and training on managing misconduct, assessing the misconduct risks of various agencies and helping agencies to better manage their misconduct risks. For example, 72 corruption prevention and education presentations and forums were delivered to almost 3,000 public officers and community members in metropolitan and regional Western Australia in 2012.
2. Misconduct function: Ensures that allegations about misconduct are appropriately investigated and dealt with. The commission may investigate the more serious allegations itself. However, the majority are referred back to the department involved for investigation the result of which may be subject to review by the commission.
3. Organised crime function: Involves the commission granting Western Australian Police so-called extraordinary powers to investigate organised crime. The commission can only grant these powers after receiving a request from police. They include the power to compel witnesses to appear at private hearings and enhanced powers of search and arrest. However, legislation prohibits the Commission from itself investigating organised crime.

The commission can conduct investigations into allegations of misconduct with powers that include the ability to hold private and public hearings, the use of telecommunications intercepts and surveillance devices, undertaking integrity tests, and for specialised staff to use assumed identities. Significant allegations dealt with by the commission include fraud (particularly in regard to procurement), bribery, the failure to declare or properly manage conflicts of interest and the misuse of government credit cards. One of the commission's biggest investigations was into the influence of lobbyists on public officers. This resulted in 11 commission reports to the Parliament ( 2007, 2008, 2009), changes to the way in which lobbyists are required to operate in the state and investigations by parliamentary committees into the handling of confidential government information by Members of Parliament. As a result of the committees' hearings, a Member of Parliament was suspended for 21 sitting days for contempt of the Parliament. Also, other Members of Parliament and several lobbyists were found guilty of contempt of the Parliament for disclosing confidential information or giving false evidence to parliamentary committees. (reports 1, 2a and 2b ).

As of 2013, the commission has a staff of 154 and an annual budget of $32 million. It is overseen by a Parliamentary Inspector who can investigate any allegation against commission officers with the power of a royal commissioner. A joint standing committee consisting of Members of Parliament from both houses and both the main parties of the Parliament also oversight the commission. The commission is headed by former District Court Judge, Commissioner Roger Macknay QC. Previous commissioners have been former Court of Appeal Judge, Len Roberts-Smith RFD QC, and the former Chief Judge of the District Court, Kevin Hammond.

== CCC and journalists ==
The commission was criticised in 2007 when it emerged it had secretly interrogated two Perth journalists. In 2006/2007 the commission held 40.5 days of open hearings and 22 days of secret hearings.

The journalists were threatened with "fine and lengthy imprisonment" if they told anyone about their attendance. Under commission law, witnesses can be fined $60,000 and imprisoned for three years if they disclose their attendance or discuss it with others.

The journalists were ABC TV's Sue Short and Channel 9's David Cooper. Channel 7's Gary Adshead and The West Australian's Robert Taylor were summonsed to appear at a hearing of the Parliamentary Inspector of the CCC which are held in private.

Short and Cooper appeared before the commission on 26 June over "...identifying the person or persons who on or about 12 May 2006 provided information and/or assisted her [Short] in identifying the new suspect for the murder of Pamela Lawrence as being in custody for another homicide”,; Adshead and Taylor were two of 21 witnesses who appeared before the Parliamentary Inspector of the commission, Malcolm McCusker, in late June and early July when he investigated the leaking of a commission document to the media on former Labor MP John D'Orazio

The journalists' union, the Media, Entertainment & Arts Alliance, described the secret hearings as "insidious and sinister".

"We are bringing it to public attention because we are deeply disturbed by its impact on the practice of journalism," Alliance WA Branch Secretary Michael Sinclair-Jones was quoted in The Australian on Thursday 8 November. He said the hearing had the characteristics of a star chamber, with interrogations and investigations held in secret and people who were unwilling to testify threatened with severe penalties.

These journalists could not tell their families, their boss, their union...it's police state stuff.

The blanket suppression of free speech at secret hearings that nobody is allowed to know even occurred is deeply troubling. But we are even more concerned that journalists are being secretly threatened with long jail sentences and massive fines for protecting confidential sources.

Such inquisitorial powers would have been unthinkable 10 years ago. Press freedom and democracy will inevitably suffer if the secret state powers are used to intimidate journalists and crush leaks.

The last Perth journalist to be imprisoned for contempt was The Sunday Times' Tony Barrass in December 1989. He was imprisoned for the maximum seven days and fined the maximum of $175 when he refused to disclose his sources of information to a court.

In November, Robert Taylor was named in the WA Parliament as the recipient of more unauthorised "privileged" information, prompting a new parliamentary investigation.

== Works cited ==
- Corruption and Crime Commission (2007). Corruption and Crime Commission Annual Report 2006 - 2007 (Report).
- Corruption and Crime Commission (2012). Corruption and Crime Commission Annual Report 2011 - 2012 (Report).
- Corruption and Crime Commission (2003). Corruption and Crime Commission Act 2003 (PDF) (Report).
