= Profit pools =

The Profit pools is a strategy model that can be used to help managers or companies focus on profits, rather than on revenue growth. The method was conceived by Orit Gadiesh and James L. Gilbert, both consultants at Bain & Co. presented the following definitions: "the total profits earned at all points along the value chain of an industry. Companies that see what others do not see, will be best prepared for capturing a larger share of the profits in an industry."

The idea states that managers need to look beyond revenues to see the shape of their industry's profit pool. Strategies can then be created which result in profitable growth. While the concept is simple, the structure of Profit Pools can usually be quite complex. Some segments of the value chain will have deeper pools than the others. The depths may also vary within an individual segment. For example, the profitability of a segment may vary widely by customer group, product category, geographic market, and distribution channel. The pattern of profit concentration in an industry will often differ from the pattern of revenue concentration.

The model is often applied to identify new sources of profit, to rethink the role of a company in the value chain, refocusing a company on its traditional sources of profit, and also applied when making product, pricing and operational decisions.
