= Anne Twomey (academic) =

Australian law professor

Professor Emerita Anne Twomey AO
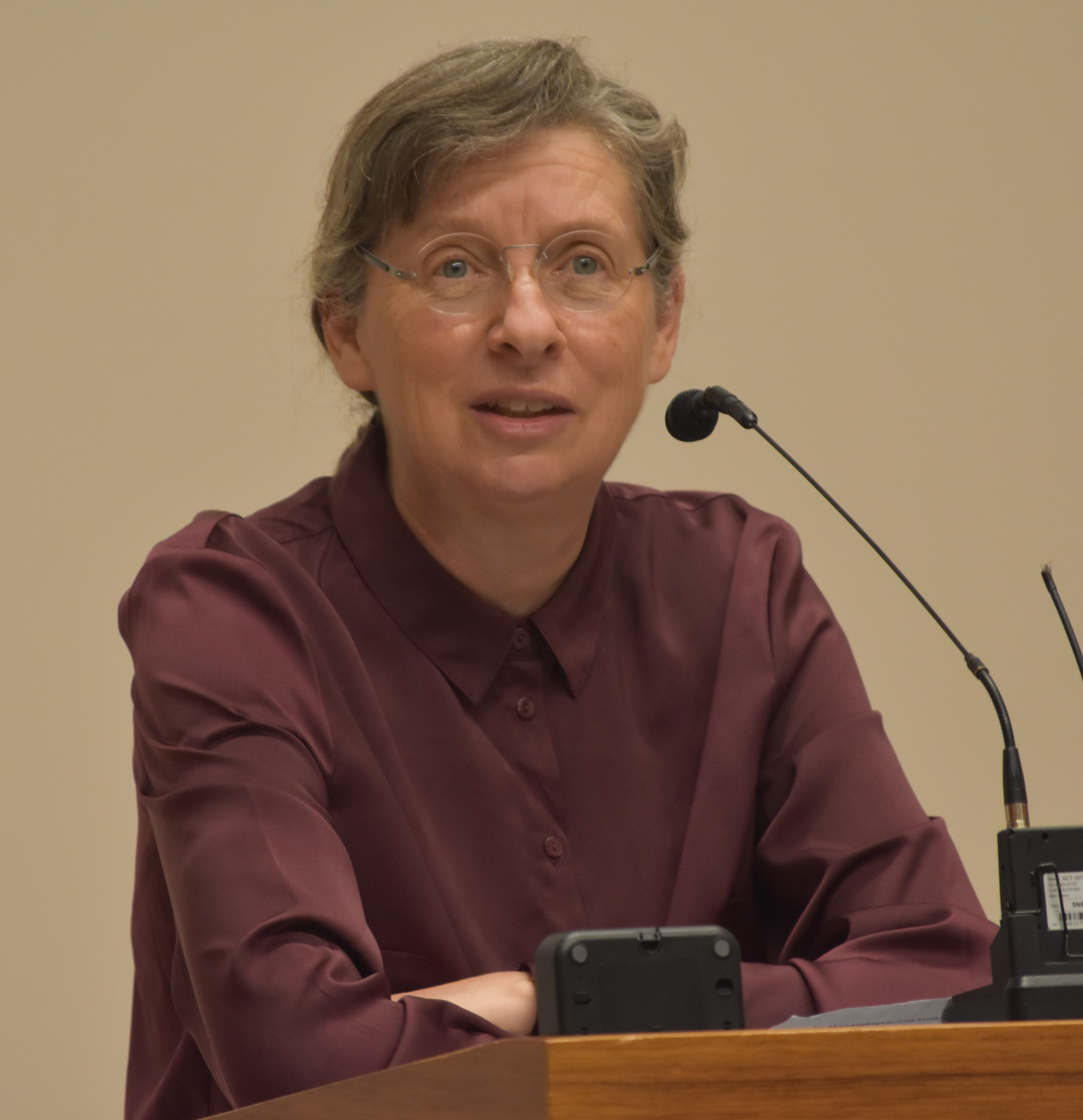
- Twomey in 2025 at Trinity College
- Spouse: Mark Leeming

Academic background
- Education: University of Melbourne (BA, LLB); Australian National University (LLM); University of New South Wales (PhD)
- Thesis: The De-Colonisation of the Australian States (2006)

Academic work
- Discipline: Law
- Sub-discipline: Australian constitutional law

Anne Frances Twomey (Note: Pronounced /ˈtuːmiː/ TOO-mee) is an Australian academic and lawyer specialising in Australian constitutional law. She is currently Professor Emerita at Sydney Law School at the University of Sydney. She is a regular commentator on legal and constitutional issues for the Australian media and also publishes detailed video content on her YouTube channel Constitutional Clarion.

== Education and academic career ==
Twomey holds degrees in Arts and Law from the University of Melbourne, a Master of Laws from the Australian National University, and a Doctor of Philosophy from the University of New South Wales.

Twomey was Senior Research Officer at the High Court of Australia from 1990 to 1992, and then Senior Officer with the Parliamentary Research Service for the Parliament of Australia in Canberra from 1992 to 1994. Twomey was Committee Secretary to the Senate Legal and Constitutional Affairs Committee in the Department of the Senate in 1995.

Twomey served as Policy Manager of the Legal Branch in the Cabinet Office of New South Wales from 1997 to 2000.

Twomey has worked as a consultant to a range of organisations, including the Museum of Australian Democracy, the Commonwealth Parliamentary Library, and NSW Treasury.

Twomey is regarded as an expert on the Constitution of Australia.

Twomey has written extensively on Indigenous constitutional recognition, and from 2014 worked with the Cape York Institute and others on early versions of what became the Voice proposal. She set out a revised recognition proposal in a 2014 journal article and published suggested amendment wording in 2015, work that later informed the First Nations dialogues leading to the 2017 Uluru Statement from the Heart. Twomey has said she prepared an early draft dated 22 August 2014, in which she placed the provision near the front of the Constitution as a new chapter, rather than adding it at the end as an afterthought, though she regarded its final placement as a matter for government. In 2023 she was a member of the Constitutional Expert Group advising the government's Referendum Working Group on the proposed amendment.

In 2019, Twomey was appointed to a New South Wales Government panel to examine the financial relationship between the state and federal governments.

In 2022, Twomey started the Constitutional Clarion YouTube channel, where she publishes her work for a more general audience.

== Honours and personal life ==
Twomey was appointed an Officer of the Order of Australia in the 2021 Queen's Birthday Honours, for "distinguished service to the law, to legal education, and to public education on constitutional matters".

Twomey is married to Justice Mark Leeming, a judge on the New South Wales Court of Appeal.

Twomey supported the 'yes' case for the Indigenous Voice to Parliament referendum.

Twomey is younger sister to Margaret Twomey AM.

== Books ==
- Twomey, Anne (2004). The Constitution of New South Wales. Sydney: Federation Press. ISBN 1-86287-516-2. OCLC 61028683.
- Twomey, Anne (2006). The Chameleon Crown: the Queen and her Australian governors. Annandale, N.S.W.: Federation Press. ISBN 978-1-86287-629-3. OCLC 180584114.
- Twomey, Anne (2010). The Australia Acts 1986: Australia's statutes of independence. Sydney: Federation Press. ISBN 978-1862878075. OCLC 673260171.
- Twomey, Anne (2018). The Veiled Sceptre: reserve powers of heads of state in Westminster systems. Cambridge, United Kingdom. ISBN 978-1-107-05678-7. OCLC 999609166.

== Reviews ==
- Murray, Stephen (23 August 2018). "Stephen Murray reviews 'The Veiled Sceptre: Reserve powers of heads of state in Westminster systems' by Anne Twomey". Australian Book Review.
- Dean, Joseph (March 2020). "Book Review: The Veiled Sceptre: Reserve Powers of Heads of State in Westminster Systems". Federal Law Review. 48 (1): 154–156. doi:10.1177/0067205X19890436. ISSN 0067-205X. S2CID 214001351.
- Murphy, Philip (2 January 2019). "The Veiled Sceptre: Reserve Powers of Heads of State in Westminster Systems, by Anne Twomey". The Journal of Imperial and Commonwealth History. 47 (1): 197–200. doi:10.1080/03086534.2019.1580868. ISSN 0308-6534. S2CID 166764005.
- McLachlin, Beverley (March 2019). "The Veiled Sceptre". Cambridge Law Journal. 78 (1): 200. doi:10.1017/S0008197318000983. S2CID 151035105. Pyke, John (2007). "Anne Twomey, The Chameleon Crown; the Queen and her Australian Governors" (PDF). QUT Law Review. 7 (1): 141–143. doi:10.5204/qutlr.v7i1.162.
