= Michael Corboy =

Australian judge and attorney

Edwin Michael Corboy is the Commissioner of the Corruption and Crime Commission and former justice of the Supreme Court of Western Australia. He commenced work as a solicitor at Norton Rose. He then joined Stone James (now King & Wood Mallesons) where he became a partner in 1987, and later became the Head of Litigation (Perth) in 1993.

In April 2023 he retired as a justice of the Supreme Court of Western Australia. As of 25 July 2024, he was appointed as a Deputy Commissioner of the Corruption and Crime Commission. In November 2025 he was announced as the new Commissioner of the Corruption and Crime Commission.
