= Wang Junfeng =

Chinese lawyer and politician

Wang Junfeng (Chinese: 王俊峰; pinyin: Wáng Jùnfēng; born 27 July 1962) is a Chinese lawyer and politician. He is currently the president of the All China Lawyers Association and also the global chairman of multinational law firm King & Wood Mallesons.

== Early life and education ==
Wang was born in Tonghua County, Tonghua, Jilin, in 1962.

Wang received a Bachelor of Law and a Master of Law from Jilin University. He received a Master of Laws and a Doctor of Juridical Science from the University of California, Berkeley School of Law.

== Career ==
=== Professional ===
He was the principal founding partner of King & Wood PRC Lawyers, one of China's largest law firms before its 2012 combination with Australian firm Mallesons Stephens Jacques. Before founding King & Wood, Wang headed the Commercial Law Department of the China Global Law Office, which a section of the China Council for Promotion of International Trade. When private law firms were first permitted in China, Wang was among the first to launch a private firm. Wang has advised on many of China's landmark legal matters.

=== Political ===
Wang was a Chinese Communist Party delegate to the 11th and 12th National Committee of the Chinese People's Political Consultative Conference. In 2015, Wang courted controversy during the annual national conference because the proposed resolution he brought to the conference advocated official status for the Chinese calendar, rather than issues relating to the welfare of lawyers or the rule of law in China.

Wang was the president of the All China Lawyers Association.

Wang was also selected as one of China's Outstanding Lawyers by the Ministry of Justice of China.

Previously, he was the director of the Chamber of Commerce 2005 Committee. He was also a member of the Sixth Share Issue Audit Committee of the China Securities Regulatory Commission.
