= Septimus Stephen =

Australian politician

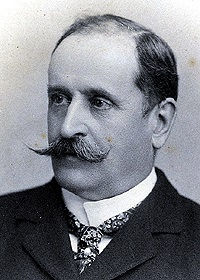
Septimus Alfred Stephen, MLC

Septimus Alfred Stephen (8 May 1842 – 28 August 1901), generally referred to as S. A. Stephen, was an Australian politician, solicitor and founding member of the law firm Stephen, Jaques and Stephen.

The Stephen family is a prominent legal dynasty in Australia. He was born in Sydney, the seventh son of Sir Alfred Stephen KCMG CB (1802–1894), who would later become Chief Justice of NSW and Lieutenant-Governor of NSW, and his second wife Eleanor Martha née Bedford. He was educated at Rev. W. H. Savigny's school and in 1858 became a solicitor's clerk, serving his articles with his brother Montagu Consett Stephen. He qualified as a solicitor in 1864 and went into partnership with his brother as Stephen and Stephen, later to become Stephen, Jaques and Stephen. A co-founding member in 1870 of Wallaroo FC, Sydney's first rugby union club. In 1882 he was elected to the New South Wales Legislative Assembly for Canterbury, serving until his appointment to the Legislative Council in 1887. He was severely affected by the 1890s drought, which damaged many of his investments in Queensland. He resigned from the Legislative Council in 1900 and died at East Woodhay in Hampshire the following year.

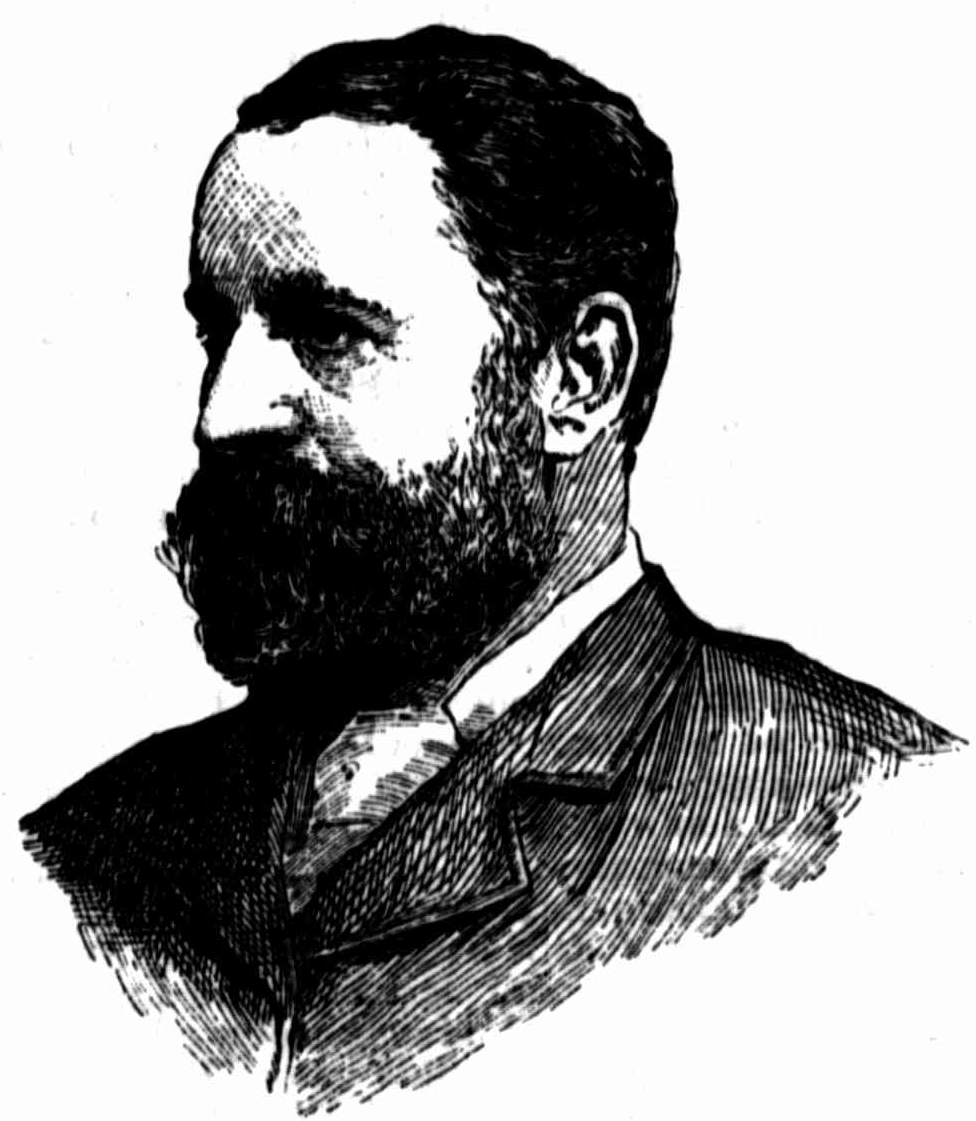
sketch of Stephen in 1887

New South Wales Legislative Assembly
Preceded by William Henson	Member for Canterbury; 1882–1887; With: William Pigott / Mark Hammond; Henry Moses / William Henson none / William Judd	Succeeded by Joseph Carruthers; William Davis; Alexander Hutchison
