= Anthony McGrath (judge) =

Australian judge

The Honourable Justice Anthony McGrath

Judge of the Supreme Court of New South Wales
- Incumbent
- Assumed office 15 August 2023
- Nominated by: Michael Daley
- Appointed by: Margaret Beazley

Personal details
- Born: Sydney, New South Wales, Australia
- Spouse(s): Kathryn (died 2013); Kate (m. 2020)
- Children: 1
- Education: University of New South Wales (BCom, LLB); University of Cambridge (LLM)
- Occupation: Judge, barrister, solicitor

Anthony McGrath is an Australian judge who has served as a judge of the Supreme Court of New South Wales in its Equity Division since 2023.

== Early life and education ==
McGrath was born in Sydney to Tony McGrath AM and Jill McGrath. He was one of five children, the only boy among four sisters. The family lived in the United Kingdom and New Zealand before returning to Australia.

McGrath graduated with a Bachelor of Commerce and a Bachelor of Laws from the University of New South Wales. In 1987 he served as tipstaff to Justice Harold Glass of the New South Wales Court of Appeal, and subsequently as tipstaff and research assistant to President Michael Kirby. In 1989 he was awarded a Master of Laws from the University of Cambridge.

== Career ==
Following his studies, McGrath commenced as a solicitor at Mallesons, where he later became a partner.

He was called to the New South Wales Bar in 2000, becoming a member of 12 Wentworth Selborne Chambers. He was appointed Senior Counsel in 2013.

His principal areas of practice were equity, commercial law, corporations law, trade practices and competition, professional negligence, banking, inquests and commissions of inquiry. He was Counsel Assisting the Independent Commission Against Corruption Inquiry Operation Misto in 2015.

== Judicial career ==
On 15 August 2023, McGrath was sworn in as a judge of the Supreme Court of New South Wales, assigned to its Equity Division. His appointment replaced Justice Philip Hallen, who retired from the court.

== Personal life ==
McGrath's first wife, Kathryn, whom he married in March 1990, died of breast cancer in 2013. They had one daughter, Megan. He married his second wife, Kate, in 2020.

== See also ==
- Supreme Court of New South Wales
