= Youth Law Australia =

- Logo of Youth Law Australia
- Abbreviation: YLA
- Formation: 1982
- Type: Non-profit, Community Legal Centre
- Purpose: Providing free legal advice, advocacy, and law reform research for young people under 25 in Australia
- Headquarters: University of New South Wales, Sydney, New South Wales, Australia
- Region served: Australia
- Members: Open to young people under 25
- Website: https://yla.org.au/

Youth Law Australia, formerly The National Children's and Youth Law Centre (NCYLC) is a Community Legal Centre which supports children and young people in Australia. It is the first community legal centre of its kind in Australia. Youth Law Australia is located within and supported by the University of New South Wales. Youth Law Australia provides free legal advice to children and young people under 25 across Australia through its innovative online delivery model. It also advocates for the rights of young people in Australia and conducts research on law reform.

In 2020–21, Youth Law Australia worked on 2799 legal matters for 1655 clients.

== See also ==
- War Widows' Guild of Australia NSW
- Vets Beyond Borders
- Our Big Kitchen
- Women In Prison Advocacy Network
