= Mark Leeming =

Australian judge

The Honourable Justice Mark Leeming

Judge of the New South Wales Court of Appeal
- Incumbent
- Assumed office 2013

Personal details
- Spouse: Anne Twomey
- Education: Sydney Grammar School
- Alma mater: University of Sydney
- Occupation: Judge, lawyer

Mark James Leeming is a judge of the Court of Appeal of the Supreme Court of New South Wales, the highest court in the State of New South Wales, Australia, which forms part of the Australian court hierarchy. He is one of the current authors of Meagher, Gummow & Lehane's Equity: Doctrines and Remedies. He is also the author of the 5th edition of Cowen and Zines's Federal Jurisdiction in Australia.

== Education ==
Leeming went to Sydney Grammar School, and then graduated with First Class Honours in law from the University of Sydney in 1992. He then served as associate to Justice Gummow, then a Judge of the Federal Court of Australia. He subsequently served as associate to the Chief Justice of the High Court of Australia, Sir Anthony Mason. He later completed a PhD in Pure Mathematics at the University of Sydney.

== Career ==
Leeming was called to the bar in 1995 and was appointed a Senior Counsel in 2006. He has been Challis Lecturer in Equity at the Sydney Law School since 2002. Leeming was appointed to the NSW Court of Appeal in 2013.

== Personal life ==
Leeming is married to Australian constitutional law academic Anne Twomey.

== See also ==
- NSW Court of Appeal
- Sydney Law School
