= Swiss association =

Type of corporation in Swiss law

A Swiss association ("Verein" in German, "association" in French, "associazione" in Italian) is a type of corporation in Swiss law. It is similar to the Anglo-American voluntary association. Unlike in Germany, a Swiss association does not need to be registered in order to obtain legal personality, but must be registered if it "conducts a commercial operation". An association can serve as a non-profit organization (NPO) or non-governmental organization (NGO) and this form is used by several Swiss sections of international NGOs such as Amnesty International, and the World Wildlife Fund, by business firms (see below) or by international organizations such as the Fédération Internationale de Football Association (FIFA). The form can also be used by political parties and alliances, such as trade unions.

As the establishment of an association involves little paperwork and no registration or fees, it is an important legal form in Switzerland and often used by groups such as sport and social clubs. It has also become a useful form for multiparty business organizations. The only requirement is that prior to the establishment, two persons draw up bylaws and appoint the organs of the association (such as the board and the auditors).

== Commercial organizations ==
The association can also be used as a legal form for a business organization consisting of a number of independent offices, each of which has limited liability vis-à-vis the others. The form is often used by multinational professional firms so they can operate globally under one brand whilst maintaining separate profit pools (and ring-fencing liability) in each country in which they operate. One advantage to the Verein structure is that because control of the firm is decentralized, offices are only bound by regulators in their country. For instance, non-US offices of accounting firms in a Verein structure are not bound by Securities and Exchange Commission subpoenas from the United States.

Since the assets and earnings of a Swiss association are controlled by the member firms, Swiss association borrowers should provide a lender with guarantees from member firms or backup letters of credit.

Several court cases against accounting firms have attempted to use vicarious liability and veil piercing arguments to find liability for the association based on a member's activities. Most associations now expressly note their status on web sites, e-mails and letterhead in order to prevent future arguments based on agency.

The Swiss Verein is similar to the European Economic Interest Grouping (EEIG), but differs in that EEIG member firms share their liabilities while Verein member firms maintain separate liabilities.

== Law firms ==
Baker McKenzie was the first major law firm to become a Swiss verein in 2004. Since 2009, Swiss vereins have been used in several mergers of large multinational law firms, as they allow regional profit pools and their related tax, accounting and partner compensation systems to remain separate while allowing strategy, branding, information technology and other core functions to be shared between the constituent partnerships. The main advantage of the verein structure is that profits can be shared between constituent partnerships, incentivizing partners to share clients and work between the member partnerships. Most law firms as vereins overcome cost sharing problem in return for work referrals, which allows for the indirect sharing of profits. This issue is not unique to vereins, as some firms structured as a single partnership maintain multiple profit centers so as to limit profit sharing within the partnership. In many cases, this works like a corporate structure, where the Swiss verein is the holding company and the member firms are the subsidiaries, making the centralization, profit and fund management more efficient.

Vereins are usually consolidated as single firms in law firm revenue and headcount rankings such as The American Lawyer's "AmLaw 100," while international referral networks such as Lex Mundi and informal "best friends" alliances are usually not consolidated for this purpose. However, some law firm vereins such as DLA Piper have minimal financial integration and primarily serve as referral relationships.

The cost sharing between verein members often has the economic effect of splitting fees between member firms in cases where work is referred between them, although revenue sharing between such member firms is often prohibited (this restriction being one of the major considerations underlying the verein structure). The details of cost sharing are not always clearly disclosed to clients and may result in higher fees than what would be charged outside of the verein relationship.

Vereins can also give rise to conflicts of interest. For example, the US arm of Dentons advised a plaintiff in suing Gap Inc., a longstanding client of the Canadian arm, which a US administrative court found created a conflict despite the fact that the two arms were operationally separate.

As of 2014, there were six major law firms structured as Swiss vereins, each averaging 3,100 attorneys and 46 offices in 33 countries (Dentons being the largest law firm worldwide by lawyer headcount):

- Baker McKenzie (numerous national partnerships)
- Dentons (Canadian, European, UK and US partnerships)
- DLA Piper (US and international partnerships)
- King & Wood Mallesons (Australian, Chinese, Hong Kong and European partnerships—though the European branch collapsed in 2017)
- Norton Rose Fulbright (US and international partnerships)
- Squire Patton Boggs (US, UK and Australian partnerships)

The model is also used by some smaller international firms such as the employment law specialist Littler Mendelson.

The Anglo-Canadian law firm Gowling WLG, formed by a merger in February 2016, uses a variant of the Swiss Verein structure in which the firm's two partnerships are members of an English company limited by guarantee.

== Accounting firms ==
Accounting firms structured as Swiss associations include:

- Crowe Horwath International
- Deloitte (until July 31, 2010)
- KPMG.

== See also ==
- Société coopérative
