= Supreme Court of New South Wales =

Superior court of New South Wales, Australia

- Coat of Arms of New South Wales

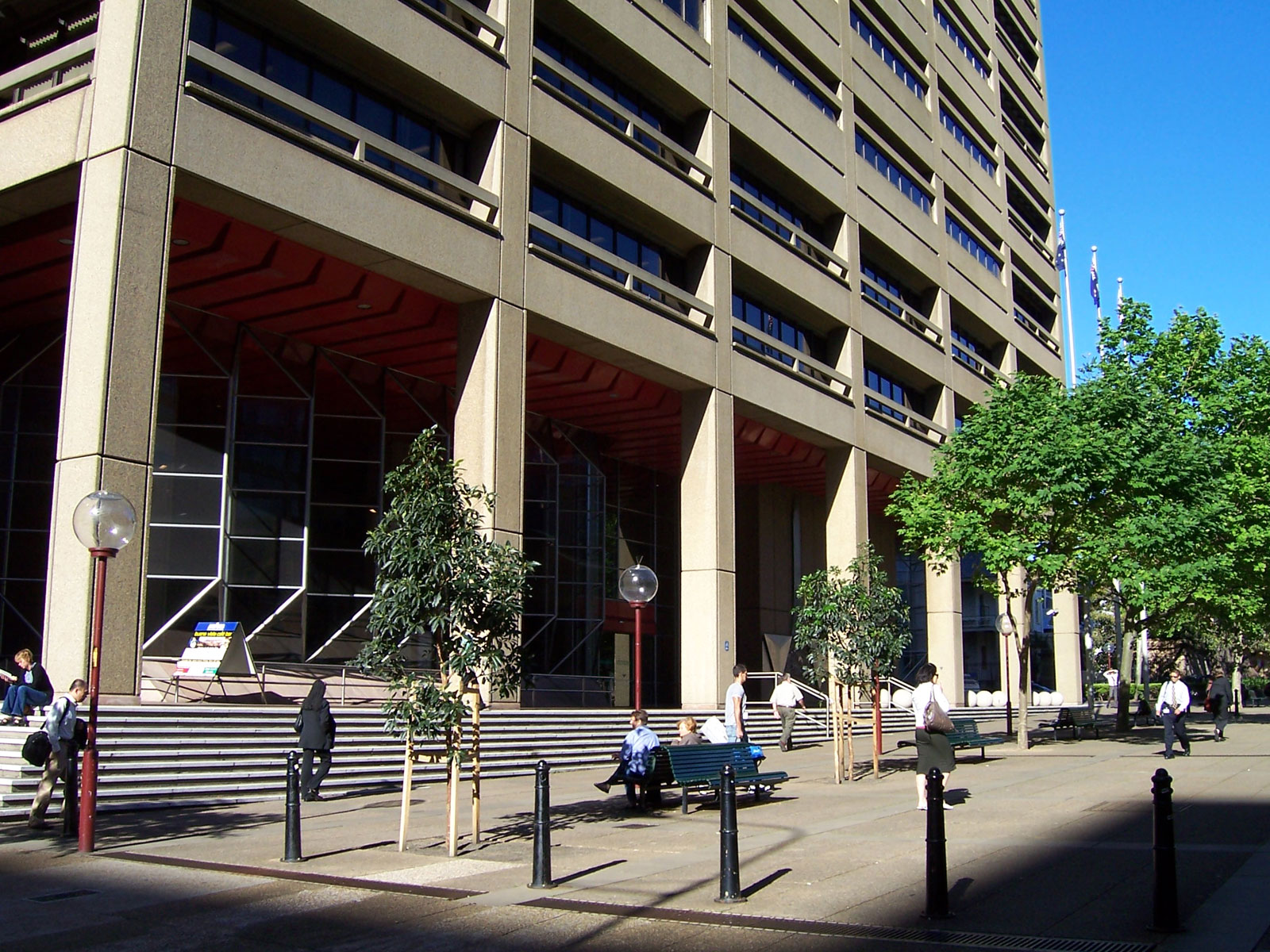
- The Law Courts Building in Queen's Square, Sydney
- Interactive map of Supreme Court of New South Wales
- 33°52′08″S 151°12′42″E
- Established: 1823
- Jurisdiction: New South Wales
- Location: Sydney
- Coordinates: 33°52′08″S 151°12′42″E
- Composition method: Appointment by the Governor on the advice of the Premier (following consultation with the attorney general and Cabinet)
- Authorised by: Parliament of New South Wales via the: Constitution Act 1902 (NSW); Supreme Court Act 1970 (NSW); Civil Procedure Act 2005 (NSW)
- Appeals to: New South Wales Court of Appeal; New South Wales Court of Criminal Appeal
- Appeals from: District Court of New South Wales; Local Court of New South Wales
- Judge term length: Mandatory retirement by age of 72
- Number of positions: 52
- Website: supremecourt.nsw.gov.au

Chief Justice of New South Wales
- Currently: Andrew Bell
- Since: 7 March 2022

Chief Judge at Common Law
- Currently: Natalie Adams
- Since: February 2026

Chief Judge in Equity
- Currently: David Hammerschlag
- Since: 17 March 2022

The Supreme Court of New South Wales is the highest state court of the Australian state of New South Wales. It has unlimited jurisdiction within the state in civil matters, and hears the most serious criminal matters. Whilst the Supreme Court is the highest New South Wales court in the Australian court hierarchy, an appeal by special leave can be made to the High Court of Australia.

Matters of appeal can be submitted to the New South Wales Court of Appeal and Court of Criminal Appeal, both of which are constituted by members of the Supreme Court, in the case of the Court of Appeal from those who have been commissioned as judges of appeal.

The Supreme Court consists of 52 permanent judges, including the Chief Justice of New South Wales, currently Andrew Bell, the President of the Court of Appeal, 10 Judges of Appeal, the Chief Judge at Common Law, and the Chief Judge in Equity.

The Supreme Court's central location is the Law Courts Building in Queen's Square, Sydney.

== History ==
=== Background ===
The first superior court of the Colony of New South Wales (known as the Supreme Court of Civil Judicature) was established by letters patent dated 2 April 1814, known as the Second Charter of Justice of New South Wales. That charter provided that there should be a Supreme Court constituted by a Judge appointed by the King's commission and two Magistrates. The charter also created the Governor's Court and the Lieutenant-Governor's Court. The jurisdiction of the Governor's Court and the Supreme Court extended to Van Diemen's Land (the former name for Tasmania). All three courts were concerned with civil matters only.

=== Establishment ===
Legislation to establish a new supreme court for both New South Wales and Van Diemen's Land was prepared in London by James Stephen, counsel to the Colonial Office, and Francis Forbes, Chief Justice of Newfoundland and Chief Justice-designate of New South Wales. The New South Wales Act 1823 was called an "Act to provide for the better administration of justice in New South Wales and Van Diemen's Land and for the more effectual government thereof" and is numbered as 4 Geo. 4. c. 96. The statute was passed on 19 July 1823.

In consequence of this legislation, letters patent establishing the New South Wales Supreme Court were sealed on 13 October 1823, and proclaimed in Sydney on 17 May 1824. They are known as the Third Charter of Justice of New South Wales.

This charter provided that there should be a Chief Justice for the colony of New South Wales in the Island of New Holland (as the continent of Australia was then known), as well as other judges, a registrar, a prothonotary, a master, and a Keeper of Records and such other Officers as may be necessary for the administration of Justice in the colony.

The charter also established the office of sheriff; gave precedence to the Chief Justice over all other subjects except the Governor (or acting Governor) of the colony; and allowed the Court to admit persons to be barristers, attorneys, proctors or solicitors as the case may be. Previously, a person had to be admitted as such in the United Kingdom. However, ex-convicts were not permitted to be admitted.

In 1840, a Port Phillip division of the Court was created, consisting of a single Resident Judge, to exercise the court's jurisdiction in the Port Phillip District of the Colony of New South Wales. The division existed until 1852, when it was replaced by the Supreme Court of Victoria following the creation of the Colony of Victoria.

Also in 1840, the Legislative Council of New South Wales established a separate equity division in the court. Limited jurisdiction in divorce cases was granted in 1873 and full Admiralty jurisdiction was added in 1911. The Supreme Court, in 1972, was one of the last Common Law jurisdictions in the world to fuse the administration of Equity and Common Law, although these continue as the historic names for the two divisions of the court. This process began in the United Kingdom with the passage of the Judicature Acts in 1873. Since 1930, three generations of the Street family have served New South Wales as Chief Justice.

Supreme Court Judges Carolyn Simpson, Margaret Beazley and Virginia Bell made headlines in April 1999 when the three sat in the Court of Criminal Appeal in Sydney. The Judges threw out an appeal from a convicted computer hacker who had, out of "sheer maliciousness", been posting offensive messages on Ausnet's homepage. According to the Women Lawyers Association of NSW, there had never been an all-female bench in England or New Zealand at the time.

== Structure and jurisdiction ==
The court now operates under the Constitution Act 1902 (NSW), the Supreme Court Act 1970 (NSW), and the Civil Procedure Act 2005 (NSW), although provisions on the appointment and removal of judicial officers were incorporated into the state's Constitution in 1992.

The court consists of 52 permanent judges, three Acting Judges of Appeal, two Acting Judges, and an Associate Judge. Permanent judges include the Chief Justice of New South Wales, the President of the Court of Appeal, eleven Judges of Appeal (one of whom is currently the Chief Judge at Common Law), the Chief Judge at Common Law and the Chief Judge in Equity, and 38 Puisne Judges.

The Chief Judge in each trial division also sits in the Court of Appeal from time to time. Occasionally, puisne judges also sit in the Court of Appeal, though this is uncommon.

The court hears very serious cases such as murder and treason, civil cases involving more than $750 000, and civil matters such as wills, injunctions, and admiralty. The court's work at first instance is divided between the Common Law Division, which hears civil, criminal and administrative law matters, and the Equity Division, which hears equity, probate, commercial, admiralty, and protective matters. The court includes the Court of Appeal and the Court of Criminal Appeal which hear appeals from the District Court and the Local Court and from single judges sitting in the Common Law or Equity Divisions. The Court of Appeal also hears appeals from the Land and Environment Court of New South Wales and a number of administrative tribunals.

The Court of Appeal and the Court of Criminal Appeal are respectively the highest civil and criminal courts in the state. To appeal to the High Court of Australia from the Court of Appeal or the Court of Criminal Appeal, special leave must be granted by the High Court.

Appeals from state supreme courts to the High Court are not limited to matters in which a federal question arises and the Constitution empowers the Federal Parliament to make laws vesting state courts with federal jurisdiction. The High Court of Australia can review decisions of the Supreme Court of New South Wales in relation to the common law and equitable jurisdictions of the court as well. The High Court of Australia has exercised this power on a number of occasions.

== Court buildings ==
The Supreme Court of New South Wales was proclaimed in Sydney on 17 May 1824.

=== Greenway Wing ===
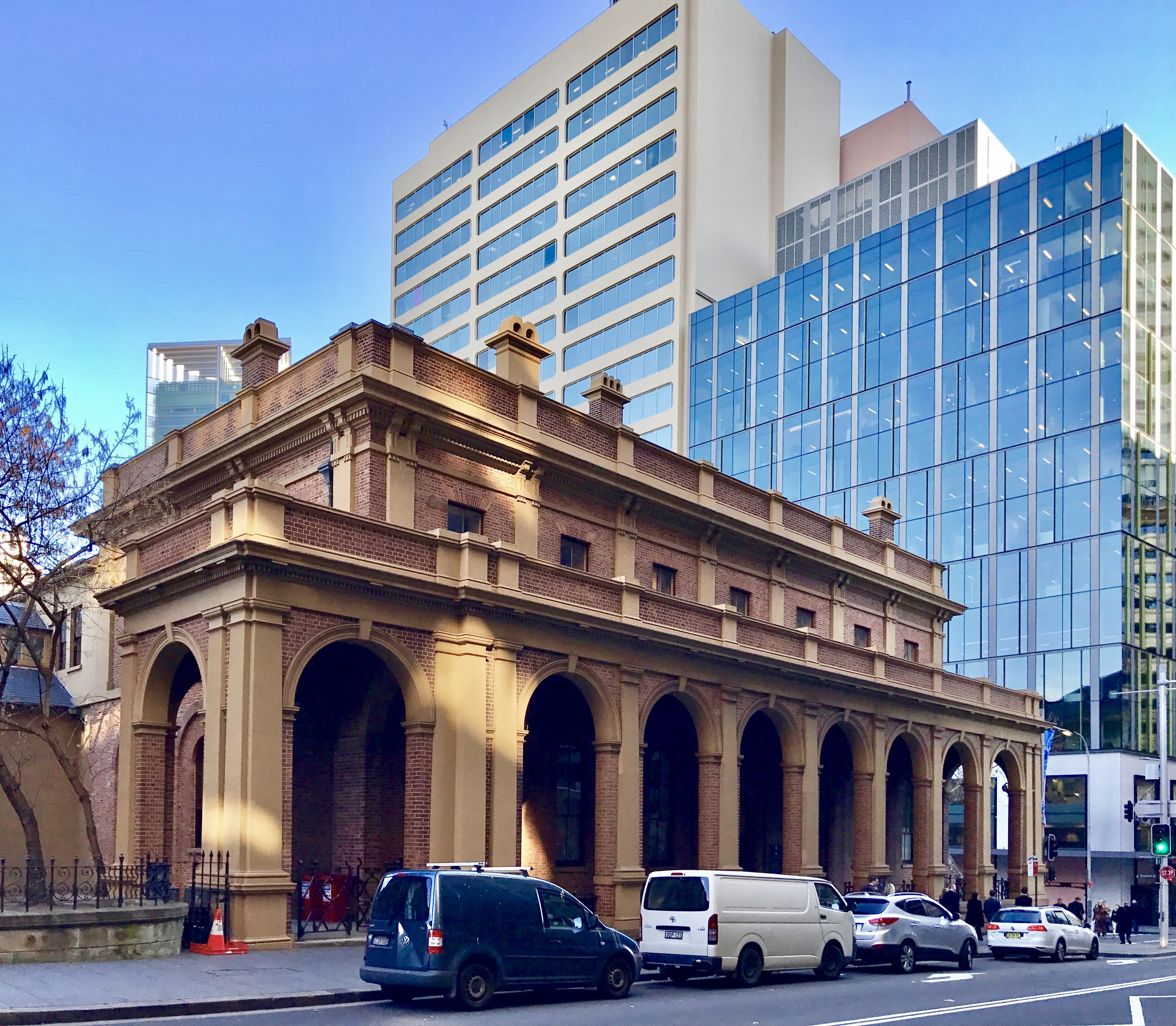
Greenway Wing on King Street

The inaugural Supreme Court building that is located on the corner of King Street and Elizabeth Street in the Sydney central business district, adjacent to what is now known as Queen's Square, was built between 1820 and 1828. The two-storey rectangular Georgian building, with an additional loggia and cornice added in 1868, was designed by Francis Greenway in 1819 under the direction of Governor Macquarie. This building is now called the Greenway Wing. Greenway was dismissed before the building was completed and its design was so modified by his successor, Standish Lawrence Harris, that the building barely resembles his original design. The building was occupied by the Supreme Court from 1827. In the 1860s James Barnet designed additions for the building including an arcaded loggia along the King Street façade and the new classical cornice and parapet for the roof, giving the structure a Victorian Italianate appearance. The building was added to the New South Wales State Heritage Register on 2 April 1999.

Greenway was also responsible for designing the nearby Hyde Park Barracks, recorded on the UNESCO World Heritage List, and St James' Church, listed on the New South Wales State Heritage Register.

=== Old Registry Wing ===
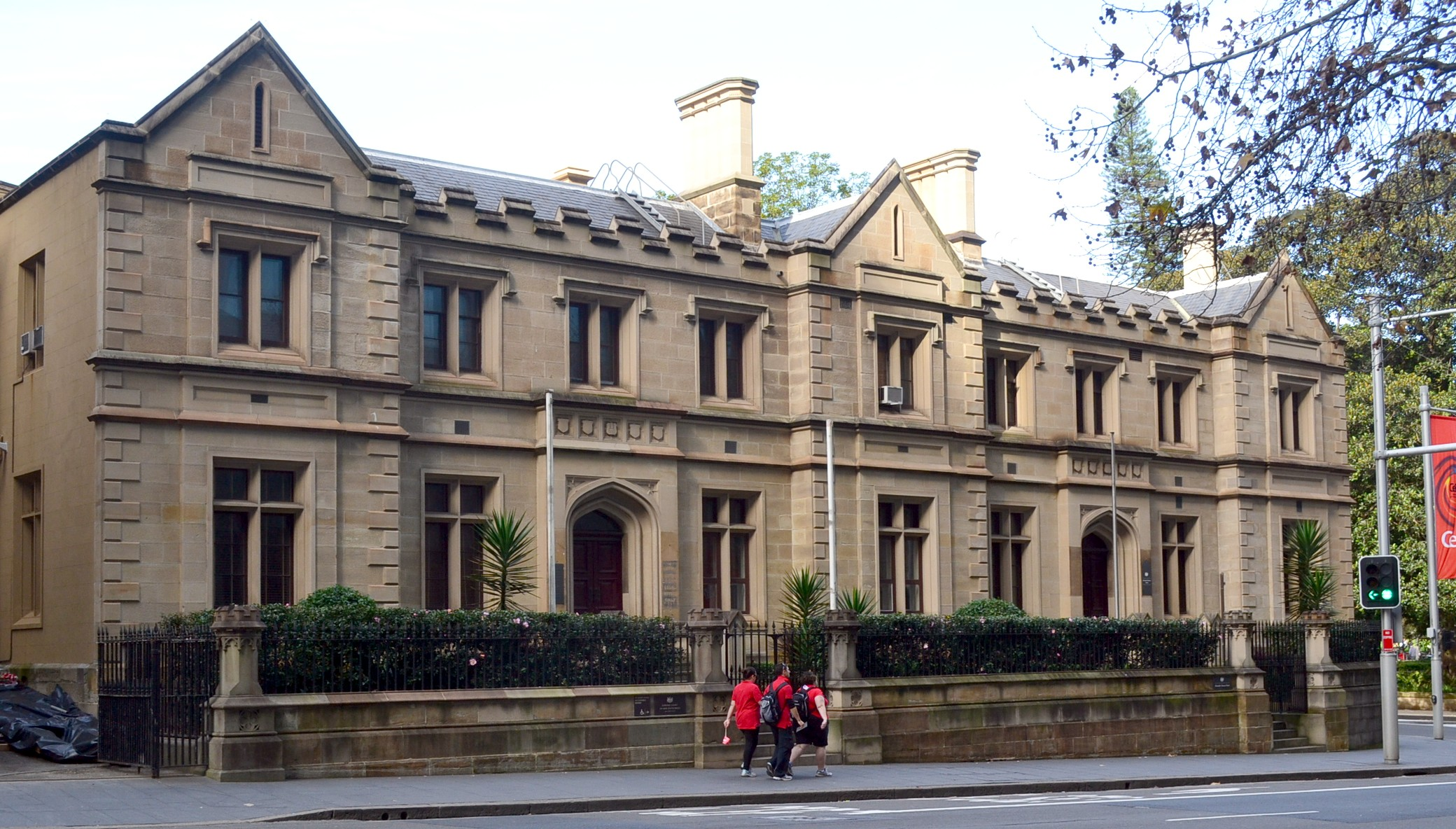
The Old Registry building, the second structure to house the Court, completed in 1862, looking east across Elizabeth Street.

The second structure to house the Court is located immediately the southwest of the Greenway Wing on the corner of Elizabeth Street and St James Road. Designed by Government Architect Alexander Dawson, it is one of only two Government buildings which were designed in the Victorian Free Gothic style, the other being the nearby Land Titles Office. Built between 1859 and 1862 and listed on the New South Wales State Heritage Register on 2 April 1999, the site is now known as the Old Registry Building. Barnet extended the Old Registry building in 1875 and 1886.

=== Banco Court wing ===
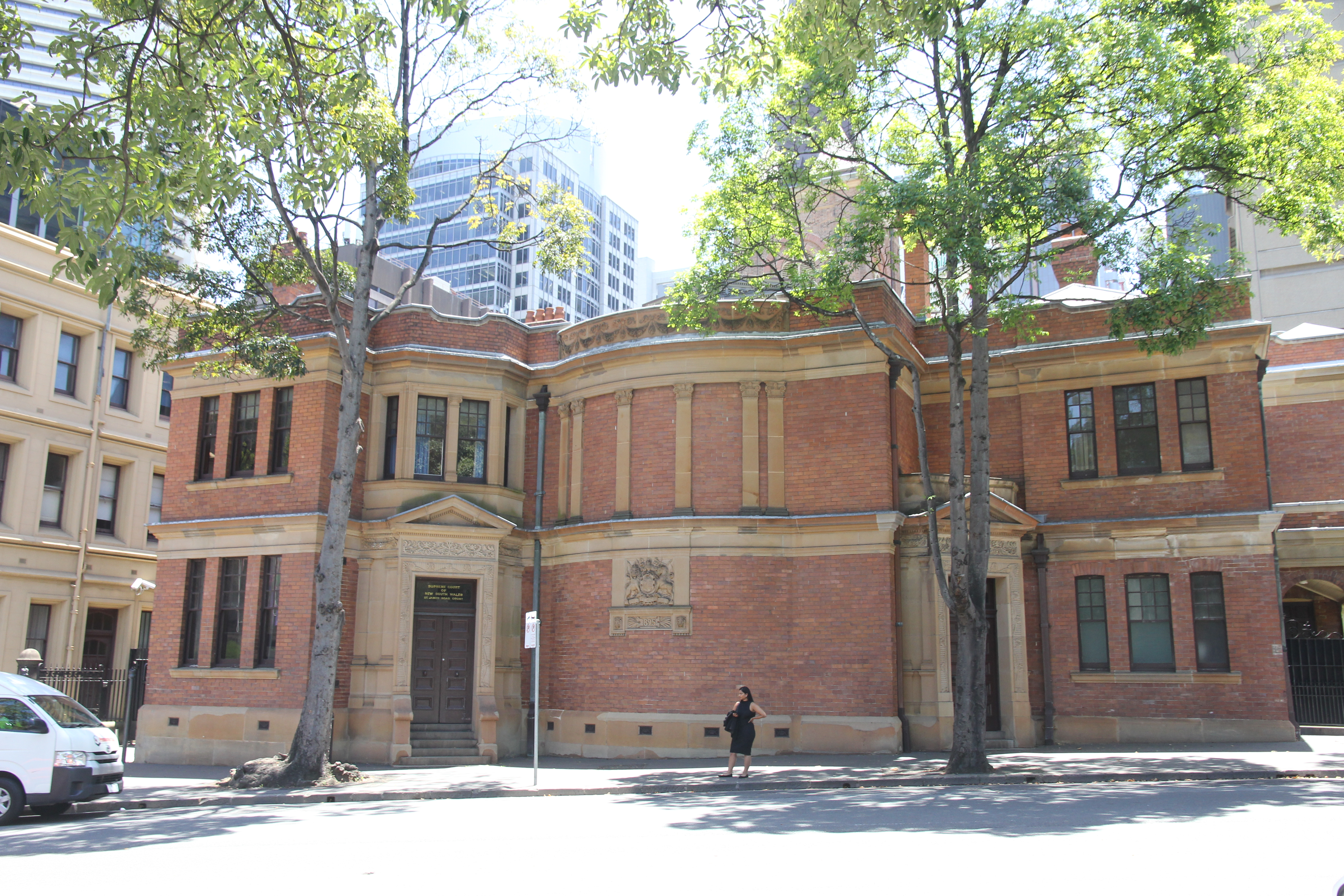
Banco Road Court

Designed by Walter Liberty Vernon and built between 1895 and 1896 in the Federation Free Classical style, the two-storey rich red brick Banco Court building was the third location of the Supreme Court. The Banco Wing is located to the east of the Old Registry building on St James Road and south of the Greenway Wing and makes little reference to the earlier buildings in either style or detailing. The interior of the courtroom has aesthetic significance and is said to be modelled on St Stephen's Court in Dublin. The court building is located in St James' Road, opposite the north-western edge of Hyde Park. Although in some sources it is referred to as "Banco Road Court", the origin of this alternative name is unknown - there is no Banco Road.

=== Law Courts Building ===
In 1976 the New South Wales Government completed construction of the Sydney Law Courts building, facing Queen's Square and bounded by Phillip and Macquarie streets. The 27-storey 33,000-square-metre (360,000 sq ft) building is owned by Law Courts Limited, a company whose shareholders comprise the Government of Australia and the Government of New South Wales. The building houses the High Court of Australia (when it sits in Sydney), the Federal Court of Australia and the NSW Supreme Court. The building was designed by architects McConnel Smith and Johnson and received an RAIA Merit Award in 1977 and stands as a strong, singular statement representative of its time and a product of the brutalist school of architecture. Refurbished in 2009 at a cost of A$214 million, a range of sustainability measures were implemented to extend the life and amenity of the building.

== Judges ==
The current judges serving on the Court as of December 2025, and the dates of their appointment, are listed below.

Name	Position	Appointment commenced	Appointment ended	Term in office	Comments	Notes
Andrew Bell	Chief Justice	7 March 2022		4 years, 255 days	President of the Court of Appeal (2019–2022)	
Julie Ward	President of the Court of Appeal	7 March 2022		4 years, 255 days	Chief Judge in Equity (2017–2022)	
Mark Leeming	Judge of Appeal	3 June 2013		13 years, 167 days		
Anthony Payne	Judge of Appeal	30 March 2016		10 years, 232 days		
Anna Mitchelmore	Judge of Appeal	28 March 2022		4 years, 234 days		
Jeremy Kirk	Judge of Appeal	21 April 2022		4 years, 210 days		
Christine Adamson	Judge of Appeal	3 February 2023		3 years, 287 days		
Christine Adamson	Judge	17 October 2011		15 years, 31 days		
Kristina Stern	Judge of Appeal	8 June 2023		3 years, 162 days		
Richard McHugh	Judge of Appeal	20 August 2024		2 years, 89 days		
Michael Ball	Judge of Appeal	4 November 2024		2 years, 13 days		
Michael Ball	Judge	13 April 2010		16 years, 218 days		
Stephen Free	Judge of Appeal	12 May 2025		1 year, 189 days		
Ian Harrison	Chief Judge at Common Law; Judge of Appeal	9 November 2023		3 years, 8 days		
Ian Harrison	Judge	12 February 2007		19 years, 278 days		
David Hammerschlag	Chief Judge in Equity	17 March 2022		4 years, 245 days		
David Hammerschlag	Judge	30 January 2007		19 years, 291 days		
John Griffiths	Acting Judge of Appeal	10 April 2022		4 years, 221 days	Previously Federal Court Judge (2012-2022)	
Derek Price AM	Judge	28 August 2006	26 April 2024	17 years, 242 days	Chief Judge of the District Court (2014–2024)	
Derek Price AM	Acting Judge of Appeal	1 June 2024		2 years, 169 days	Chief Judge of the District Court (2014–2024)	
Michael Walton	Judge	8 December 2016		27 years, 334 days	Former Vice President & President of the Industrial Court of NSW (December 1998 - December 2016)	
Stephen Rothman AM	Judge	3 May 2005		21 years, 198 days		
Michael Slattery AM	Judge	25 May 2009		17 years, 176 days	Judge Advocate General (Australia)	
Peter Garling RFD	Judge	7 June 2010		16 years, 163 days		
Ashley Black	Judge	4 July 2011		15 years, 136 days		
Stephen Campbell	Judge	2 May 2012		14 years, 199 days		
Geoff Lindsay AM	Judge	6 August 2012		14 years, 103 days		
François Kunc	Judge	8 April 2013		13 years, 223 days		
Robertson Wright	Judge	25 October 2013		13 years, 23 days		
Peter Hamill	Judge	29 April 2014		12 years, 202 days		
Des Fagan	Judge	11 June 2015		11 years, 159 days		
Natalie Adams	Judge	5 April 2016		10 years, 226 days		
Julia Lonergan	Judge	21 March 2017		9 years, 241 days		
Guy Parker	Judge	6 April 2017		9 years, 225 days		
Kelly Rees	Judge	5 September 2018		8 years, 73 days		
Lea Armstrong	Judge	31 October 2018		8 years, 17 days	Formerly the NSW Crown Solicitor, Appointed as President of the NSW Civil and Administrative Tribunal	
Mark Ierace	Judge	31 January 2019		7 years, 290 days		
Richard Cavanagh	Judge	16 September 2019		7 years, 62 days		
Kate Williams	Judge	15 April 2020		6 years, 216 days		
Hament Dhanji	Judge	20 September 2021		5 years, 58 days		
Elisabeth Peden	Judge	6 April 2022		4 years, 225 days		
Mark Richmond	Judge	19 April 2022		4 years, 212 days		
Michael Meek	Judge	5 May 2022		4 years, 196 days		
Dina Yehia	Judge	4 July 2022		4 years, 136 days		
Nicholas Chen	Judge	11 July 2022		4 years, 129 days		
Sarah McNaughton	Judge	11 October 2022		4 years, 37 days		
Richard Weinstein	Judge	1 February 2023		3 years, 289 days		
Deborah Sweeney	Judge	8 February 2023		3 years, 282 days		
Scott Nixon	Judge	8 August 2023		3 years, 101 days		
Anthony McGrath	Judge	15 August 2023		3 years, 94 days		
Sarah Huggett	Judge	12 December 2023		2 years, 340 days	Chief Judge of the District Court (2024–)	
Ian Pike	Judge	30 January 2024		2 years, 291 days		
James Hmelnitsky	Judge	1 February 2024		2 years, 289 days		
Tim Faulkner	Judge	23 May 2024		2 years, 178 days		
Belinda Rigg	Judge	24 July 2024		2 years, 116 days		
Andrew Coleman	Judge	1 October 2024		2 years, 47 days		
Peter Brereton	Judge	6 February 2025		1 year, 284 days		
Hayley Bennett	Judge	1 July 2025		1 year, 139 days		
Paul McGuire	Judge	8 July 2025		1 year, 132 days		
Edward Muston	Judge	2 December 2025		350 days		
James Emmett	Judge	4 December 2025		348 days		
Monika Schmidt	Acting Judge	3 February 2020		6 years, 287 days		
Monika Schmidt	Judge	27 July 2009	11 September 2019	10 years, 46 days	Judge of the Industrial Court of NSW (1993–2009)	
Michael Elkaim	Acting Judge	30 January 2023		3 years, 291 days	Former ACT Supreme Court Judge (2016-2022)	
Robert Hulme	Acting Judge	5 June 2024		2 years, 165 days		
Robert Hulme	Judge	2 March 2009	16 September 2022	13 years, 198 days		
Joanne Harrison	Associate Judge	1997		28–29 years		

== See also ==
- Chief Justice of New South Wales
- List of judges of the Supreme Court of New South Wales
- List of New South Wales courts and tribunals
- New South Wales Court of Appeal
- New South Wales Court of Criminal Appeal
- NSW Law Reports
- President of the NSW Court of Appeal
