= Julie Ward (judge) =

Australian judge

The Honourable Justice Julie Kathryn Ward

President of the New South Wales Court of Appeal
- Incumbent
- Assumed office 7 March 2022
- Preceded by: Andrew Bell

Judge of the Supreme Court of NSW
- Incumbent
- Assumed office 29 September 2008

Judge of Appeal
- In office 12 November 2012 – 5 March 2022

Chief Judge in Equity
- In office 15 March 2017 – 5 March 2022
- Preceded by: Patricia Bergin
- Succeeded by: David Hammerschlag

Personal details
- Born: 1961 or 1962 (age 64–65)
- Education: University of Sydney; University of Oxford
- Occupation: Judge, Solicitor

Julie Kathryn Ward is the President of the New South Wales Court of Appeal within the Supreme Court of New South Wales, the highest court in the State of New South Wales, Australia.

== Education ==
Ward studied French and Law at the University of Sydney, graduating in 1982 with First Class Honours and the university medal. After graduation Ward served as associate to Justice Nigel Bowen, the first Chief Justice of the Federal Court of Australia. She then commenced as a solicitor at Stephen Jaques Stone James (later Mallesons Stephen Jacques, now King & Wood Mallesons) in 1982. Ward later received a post-graduate scholarship from Sydney Law School and studied at the University of Oxford.

== Career ==
In 1988, Ward was made a partner at Mallesons. In 2008 she was appointed as a judge of the Supreme Court of New South Wales. Ward is among the very few solicitors, and the first woman, to have been appointed directly to the bench. After four years as a trial judge Ward was appointed to the Court of Appeal. In 2017 Ward was appointed Chief Judge in Equity, and in 2022 she was appointed President of the New South Wales Court of Appeal.

Legal offices
Preceded by Patricia Bergin	Chief Judge in Equity; 2017–2022	Succeeded by David Hammerschlag
Preceded by Andrew Bell	President of the New South Wales Court of Appeal; 2022–	Incumbent
