= 2015 Australia Day Honours =

The 2015 Australia Day Honours were announced on 26 January 2015 by the Governor General of Australia, Sir Peter Cosgrove.

The Australia Day Honours are the first of the two major annual honours lists, announced on Australia Day (26 January), with the other being the Queen's Birthday Honours which are announced on the second Monday in June.

== Order of Australia ==
=== Knight of the Order of Australia (AK) ===
Order of Australia (Civil) ribbon

==== General Division ====
Recipient	Citation	Notes
His Royal Highness Prince Philip, Duke of Edinburgh KG KT OM AC GBE ONZ GCL QSO CC CMM CD PC	Prince Consort of Australia	
Air Chief Marshal Angus Houston AC, AFC	For extraordinary and pre-eminent achievement and merit in service to Australia, through distinguished service in the Australian Defence Force, continued commitment to serve the nation in leadership roles, particularly the national responses to the MH370 and MH17 disasters, and in a variety of roles in the community.	

=== Companion of the Order of Australia (AC) ===
==== General Division ====
Recipient	Citation	Notes
Marcus Besen AO	For eminent service to the visual and performing arts as a leading benefactor and supporter, through philanthropic contributions to a range of social welfare, community health, educational and youth initiatives, and to business.	
Professor Jeremy Chapman OAM	For eminent service to medicine, particularly in the areas of clinical and biomedical research, to the development of ethical policy and practices for organ donation, acquisition and transplantation, and to renal medicine organisations and publications.	
Professor Brendan Crabb	For eminent service to medical science as a prominent researcher of infectious diseases, particularly malaria, and their impact on population health in developing nations, as an advocate, mentor and administrator, and through fostering medical research nationally and internationally.	
Professor John Funder AO	For eminent service to medicine, particularly to cardiovascular endocrinology, as a renowned researcher, author and educator, to the development of academic health science centres, and to mental illness, obesity, and Indigenous eye-health programs.	
Professor Janice Reid AM	For eminent service to the tertiary education sector through executive roles, as an advocate for equitable access to educational opportunities, particularly for Indigenous, refugee and lower socio-economic communities, and to health, medical and health care research and cultural bodies.	

=== Officer of the Order of Australia (AO) ===
==== General Division ====
Recipient	Citation	Notes
The Honourable Richard Alston	For distinguished service to the Parliament of Australia, to international relations through diplomatic roles, to business development in diverse sectors, and to the community.	
The Honourable Justice Roslyn Atkinson	For distinguished service to the judiciary and to law reform in Queensland, through contributions to the legal profession and to promoting awareness of issues of injustice and inequality in Australia and internationally.	
Layne Beachley	For distinguished service to the community through support for a range of charitable organisations, as a mentor for women in sport, and to surfing as a world champion competitor.	
His Excellency Stephen Brady CVO	For distinguished service to successive Australian Governments, to international relations through senior diplomatic roles, to the fostering of security, economic and cultural initiatives, and as Official Secretary to the Governor-General.	
Doctor Diane Brown	For distinguished service to nursing through the delivery of quality care, professional development and nursing education, and to the international advancement of the profession throughout Asia and the South Pacific.	
Joan Clemenger	For distinguished service to the visual and performing arts as a benefactor, patron and supporter, and through philanthropic contributions to a range of charitable organisations, and to the community.	
Peter Clemenger AM	For distinguished service to the visual and performing arts as a benefactor, patron and supporter, and through philanthropic contributions to a range of charitable organisations, and to the community.	
Frank Costa OAM	For distinguished service to the community of Geelong through ongoing roles and contributions to a range of sports, business, religious, medical, educational and social welfare organisations.	
Professor Kerry Cox	For distinguished service to tertiary education and university administration particularly through leadership and governance roles, and to the community.	
John Cripps	For distinguished service to primary industry through internationally renowned, innovative contributions to the agriculture and food sectors, and to the community.	
The Honourable Doctor Rosemary Crowley	For distinguished service to the Parliament of Australia as a Minister in the Commonwealth Government and Senator representing the people of South Australia, and as an advocate for promoting the status of women.	
John Denton	For distinguished service to business and commerce, particularly in the legal profession, to the visual and performing arts sectors, to social welfare and the rights of refugees.	
Professor Peter Ebeling	For distinguished service to medicine in the field of bone health, through academic contributions and research initiatives in a range of administrative, executive and professional roles.	
The Late Professor John Freney	For distinguished service to conservation and the environment through research into greenhouse gas production, climate change and the efficient use of nitrogen fertiliser.	
Professor Mike Gore AM	For distinguished service to science through a range of public outreach, communication and education initiatives on a national and international level, and as a mentor and role model for young scientists.	
Professor Ken Hillman	For distinguished service to intensive care medicine as a clinician, educator and researcher, as a pioneer in the introduction of the medical emergency team system, and as an advocate for the critically ill.	
Sean Howard	For distinguished service to a range of charitable organisations, particularly youth welfare and medical research, as a major benefactor and supporter, and to business.	
Hugh Mackay	For distinguished service to the community in the areas of social research and psychology, as an author and commentator, and through roles with visual and performing arts and educational organisations.	
Ian McPhee PSM	For distinguished service to public administration, particularly in the areas of accountability and policy development, to the enhancement of public sector performance, and to professional auditing and assurance standards.	
Christopher Madden	For distinguished service to tertiary education, to the strengthening of collaborative international education partnerships and cultural cooperation, and as an educator, role model and mentor.	
Professor John Mills	For distinguished service to medicine as a researcher and physician in the field of infectious diseases, particularly HIV-AIDS, to medical administration, and to the development of Australia's biotechnology industry.	
Bill Moss AM	For distinguished service to the community as a benefactor to a range of organisations, to advancing and supporting research into muscular dystrophy, and to improving the quality of life for people with disabilities.	
Professor Adrian Pagan	For distinguished service to tertiary education as an academic economist, to the development of public policy research, as an author, and through contributions to professional and financial organisations.	
Gregory Paramor	For distinguished service to the community through executive roles in a range of fields, including breast cancer research, sport and the not-for-profit sector, and to the real estate and property investment industries.	
Professor James Patrick	For distinguished service to science through the development of cochlear implant technology, to biomedical research and engineering innovation, and to education and professional associations.	
The Honourable Andrew Rogers QC	For distinguished service to the judiciary and to the law, particularly reforms to commercial dispute resolution and case management, through contributions to international commercial arbitration, and to the community.	
Norma Rosenhain	For distinguished service to commerce, through business model innovation, to philanthropy, particularly supporting disadvantaged families in Asia, and to Australia-China relations.	
Michael Shepherd	For distinguished service to the disabled, particularly as a strong advocate for the hearing impaired, to community health through leadership and governance roles, and to financial services.	
William Spurr	For distinguished service to tourism, to education, particularly through international marketing, to the arts and sport as an administrator of institutions and events, and to the community of South Australia.	
Associate Professor Phillip Stricker	For distinguished service to medicine and medical research, as a leading urologist, a robotic surgery pioneer, a teacher and mentor, and as an advocate for prostate cancer awareness.	
Therese Temby	For distinguished service to education through leadership, administration, advocacy and policy development roles in the Catholic education sector, and to community health.	
David Tune PSM	For distinguished service to public administration through leadership of finance, budget and social policy initiatives, as an adviser to government, and through disaster recovery coordination and liaison.	
Professor Nancy Viviani	For distinguished service to tertiary education and international relations, as a scholar, teacher and author, and in particular as an advocate for Australia's engagement with the Asian region.	
Professor Denis Wakefield	For distinguished service to medicine, particularly in the field of ocular immunology and immunopathology, as a clinician, researcher and academic.	
Lang Walker	For distinguished service to the community as a significant benefactor and supporter of social welfare, medical research, health care, heritage and sporting causes, and to commerce.	
Brian White	For distinguished service to business through leadership in the real estate, professional services and property industries, and to the arts as a patron, supporter and donor.	
Adjunct Professor Daniel Wood	For distinguished service to the mining and resource industry, particularly mineral exploration, through contributions as a geologist and academic, and in executive roles.	
Bernard Wright	For distinguished service to the Parliament of Australia, particularly through contributions to the understanding and development of parliamentary law, practice and procedure, and as an adviser to the Members of the House of Representatives.	

==== Military Division ====
Branch	Recipient	Citation	Notes
Navy	Rear Admiral Michael van Balen RAN	For distinguished service as Commodore Support, Fleet Command; Director, Coalition Coordination Centre, United States Central Command; and Deputy Chief of Navy.	
Army	Major General Stuart Smith DSC, AM	For distinguished service as Commander 3rd Brigade and Commander 1st Division.	
Air Force	Air Vice-Marshal Mel Hupfeld DSC	For distinguished service to the Australian Defence Force in senior command and staff appointments.	

=== Member of the Order of Australia (AM) ===
==== General Division ====
Recipient	Citation	Notes
Kathleen Anne Abbott	For significant service to the Indigenous community of the Northern Territory as an advocate for improved health and well-being.	
David Anthony Addington	For significant service to the community through refugee support organisations, particularly the provision of financial assistance programs.	
Professor Nihal Singh Agar	For significant service to the Hindu community in Australia, to the fostering of crosscultural cooperation and networking, and to medical education.	
Abla Amad	For significant service to the tourism and hospitality industry as a chef, restaurateur and author, and to the Lebanese community in Australia.	
Associate Professor David Bruce Baines	For significant service to medicine in the field of paediatric anaesthesia as a clinician, administrator and mentor, and to medical education.	
Dr Kenneth Robert Baker	For significant service to people with disabilities through executive and advocacy roles, and to national policy design and implementation.	
Mark Bradley Barnaba	For significant service to the investment banking and financial sectors, to business education, and to sporting and cultural organisations.	
Neville John Bassett	For significant service to the community, particularly through executive roles with the Royal Flying Doctor Service of Australia.	
Leanne Faye Benjamin OBE	For significant service to the performing arts, particularly ballet, as a dancer and role model.	
Emeritus Professor John Henry Bennett	For significant service to tertiary education and research in the field of genetics, and to the analysis and preservation of science history.	
Professor Roy Gary Beran	For significant service to medicine, particularly neurology, as a clinician, author and administrator, and to professional medical legal organisations.	
The Honourable Richard John Beswick	For significant service to the Parliament of Tasmania, to social welfare and primary industries, to local government, and to the community.	
Bohdan Bilinsky	For significant service to tertiary legal education through a range of academic and executive roles, as a practitioner, and to the community.	
Wendy Marlene Borchers	For significant service to the film and television industry as a researcher, producer and archivist, and to the preservation of Indigenous heritage.	
Mark Leigh Bouris	For significant service to the finance industry, particularly the home loan mortgage sector, to education, and to charitable organisations.	
Thomas Gabor Breuer	For significant service to the building and construction industry, to the community of Western Sydney, and to charitable organisations.	
Melven Ronald Brown	For significant service to recreational and sports fishing, and to scuba diving, through a range of professional organisations and advisory roles.	
David Anthony Buckingham	For significant service to public administration, particularly Australia-Britain relations, to business, and to tertiary education.	
Michael Damian Burgess	For significant service to public administration in the Northern Territory through governance, coordination, and infrastructure development roles.	
Dr John Robert Burke	For significant service to medicine in the field of paediatric nephrology as a clinician and administrator, and to professional medical associations.	
Malcolm John Bush	For significant service to the logistics and transport industry through a range of executive roles, to business, and to the community.	
Geoffrey Gordon Butler	For significant service to the community of Tasmania through health and aged care, sporting, business, local government and tourism bodies.	
Anne Buttsworth PSM	For significant service to women through history preservation roles, to the advancement of archival research, and to the community of the Australian Capital Territory.	
Dr Wendy Patricia Cahill	For significant service to education, to professional standards development, and to improved outcomes for students.	
Professor Rosemary Vivian Calder	For significant service to public administration, particularly in the areas of mental health and ageing, through academic roles, and to the community.	
Emeritus Professor Paul John Canfield	For significant service to veterinary science education, particularly in the field of morbid anatomy and clinical pathology, and to professional associations.	
Elaine Sylvia Canty	For significant service to the community through roles with botanic, health, business and sporting organisations, and as a radio broadcaster.	
Dr Peter Michael Casey	For significant service to secondary education as an administrator and teacher, to professional organisations, and to the community of Ballarat.	
Alan James Clayton	For significant service to the community through executive roles with the Australian Red Cross.	
Emeritus Professor Thomas Grattan Cochrane	For significant service to library and information management, particularly to copyright law, and to education through electronic learning initiatives.	
Dr David Dumas Coffey	For significant service to engineering, particularly in the areas of environmental and geotechnical investigation, to business, and to tertiary education.	
Julius Colman	For significant service to the community through philanthropic support for educational initiatives and programs for underprivileged children.	
Professor Anthony James Costello	For significant service to medicine in the field of urology as a clinician, administrator and author, to cancer research, and to medical education.	
William Dean Cowan	For significant service to the community through educational, medical research and arts organisations, and to business.	
Lady (Anna) Cowen	For significant service to youth, medical research, educational, historical and cultural organisations, and to the people of Australia through vice-regal patronages and support roles.	
Professor John Sydney Croucher	For significant service to mathematical science in the field of statistics, as an academic, author, and mentor, and to professional organisations.	
Professor Rosalind Frances Croucher	For significant service to the law as an academic, to legal reform and education, to professional development, and to the arts.	
Deborah Anne De Williams	For significant service to the community through contributions to a range of cancer support organisations, and to ultra marathon running.	
Major Noël James Denton RFD, ED (Retd)	For significant service to the visual and performing arts, and through a range of local government, environmental and community groups.	
Peter James Drysdale	For significant service to the international community through the provision of low-cost housing for disadvantaged persons in Fiji.	
Kristy Louise Ellis	For significant service to surf lifesaving, particularly as a competitor and role model, and through contributions to ethical standards.	
Professor Robyn Ann Ewing	For significant service to tertiary education through academic and administrative roles, to professional organisations, and to the arts.	
Graham John Fear	For significant service to the community through support for a range of clinical music therapy, social welfare, and children's charities.	
Glenn Wayne Ferguson	For significant service to the law and to the legal profession, both nationally and in the Asia-Pacific region, and to the community.	
Howard Keith Fisher	For significant service to the community through the health insurance industry, to industrial relations, and to local government.	
Professor Michael Sidney Frommer	For significant service to medicine, particularly in the areas of public health and medical education, and to policy development and reform.	
Professor Peter James Fuller	For significant service to medicine as an endocrinologist, through contributions to medical research and professional organisations.	
Dr John Julian Galloway	For significant service to technological science, particularly to cybernetics and general systems theory, and to the community.	
Associate Professor Raymond Garrick	For significant service to medicine in the field of chronic pain management, and to medical education as an academic.	
John Gaskin	For significant service to the building and construction industry in Queensland, to professional organisations, and to the community.	
Andrew Harald Gatenby	For significant service to medicine, particularly as a colorectal surgeon, and to the community of south west Sydney.	
David Robert Glasgow	For significant service to the law as a magistrate, and to the Indigenous communities of northern Queensland.	
Dr David Golovsky	For significant service to medicine, particularly in the fields of urology and fertility.	
Dr Alexander Bennett Gosling	For significant service to business through innovative support for research and development, and to the community.	
Ian Ross Govey	For significant service to public administration and to the law, as a leader in the provision of government legal services, and to professional organisations.	
Carrie Ann Graf	For significant service to basketball, particularly as a coach, mentor and athlete, and to the community.	
Emeritus Professor John Richard Green	For significant service to tertiary education, particularly archaeology, as an academic, author and field researcher.	
James Vincent Hallion	For significant service to public administration in South Australia, particularly to transport infrastructure, energy and agriculture.	
Warren Halloran	For significant service to the Shoalhaven community through philanthropic support for maritime, educational, arts, and conservation organisations.	
Professor Malcolm Rosswyn Haskard	For significant service to science, particularly to electronic engineering, and to the community.	
Professor Milton Thomas Hearn	For significant service to science through major contributions to advances in chemical manufacturing.	
Donald Edward Heathcote	For significant service to the community, particularly through support for the arts, and to surf lifesaving.	
Anne Elizabeth Henderson	For significant service to literature in the field of political history, and to the community by fostering public debate and discussion.	
The Reverend Gregor Sutherland Henderson	For significant service to the community through executive and ministerial roles in the Uniting Church in Australia, and through interfaith initiatives.	
Menno Henneveld	For significant service to engineering, particularly road transport infrastructure.	
Professor David Tom Hill	For significant service to international relations as an advocate of Australia-Indonesia cross-cultural understanding, and as an educator.	
Dr Peter Tak-Sum Ho	For significant service to civil and structural engineering, and to professional organisations.	
Dr Yvonne Ho	For significant service to radiology and nuclear medicine, as a practitioner and educator, and through professional organisations.	
The late Mr Christopher Appleby Holt	For significant service to the print media industry, particularly in the area of legal publishing.	
Trevor Maxwell Huggard	For significant service to the community through a range of roles with heritage conservation, cultural, and sporting organisations.	
John Christopher Jeremy	For significant service to the preservation and celebration of naval and maritime history.	
Dr Ronald Joffe	For significant service to neurological medicine as a physician, teacher and advocate.	
Diane Katrina Johnstone	For significant service to international relations through support for creative arts in South Africa, and to the community of Canberra.	
The late Mr Henry Robert Jones	For significant service to the conservation of the Lower Murray River, and to the community.	
Emeritus Professor Peter Laurence Juliff	For significant service to information technology as a pioneer educator, and through professional organisations.	
Dr Catherine Anne Kezelman	For significant service to community health as a supporter and advocate for survivors of child abuse.	
Adjunct Professor Betty Ann Kitchener OAM	For significant service to the community through mental health support, research and education programs.	
Micheal George Knipe	For significant service to optometry through executive roles with professional organisations, and to the community of Timor-Leste.	
The Honourable Craig John Knowles	For significant service to local government, to the Parliament of New South Wales, and to the community through a range of health initiatives.	
Professor Boguslawa (Bogda) Koczwara	For significant service to medical oncology through clinical practice, education and cancer research, and through a range of professional organisations.	
Gilbert Hung Lau	For significant service to the tourism and hospitality sectors through the restaurant and catering industry.	
Robert William Lay	For significant service to sports administration and athletics in Victoria through a range of executive positions, and to the community.	
Peter Raymond Lewis	For significant service to international trade and the Australian biotechnology and information technology industries.	
Professor Peter John Lloyd	For significant service to economics, particularly in the area of international trade theory and analysis.	
Stephen Loosley	For significant service to the community through the development of public policy, to international relations, and to the Parliament of Australia.	
Associate Professor David Zachary Lubowski	For significant service to medicine in the field of colorectal surgery as a clinician and researcher, and to professional organisations.	
Janette Belva McClelland	For significant service to a range of education, business, social welfare and community organisations, and to public administration.	
Murray Ross McCutcheon	For significant service to property and commercial law, particularly to national reform initiatives, and to legal professional bodies.	
John Robert McDonald	For significant service to business through senior accountancy roles, to the not-for-profit sector, and to sporting organisations.	
Anne Elizabeth McKenzie	For significant service to community health through consumer advocacy roles and strategic policy research and development.	
Dr Barbara Joan Maddern-Wellington	For significant service to veterinary science, to professional associations, to animal welfare, and to the community.	
Professor Lisa Maher	For significant service to medicine in the field of epidemiology, particularly through academic research into illicit drug use.	
Peter John Marriott	For significant service to youth through the Scouting movement, to entomological research and authorship, and to education.	
Terence John Meehan	For significant service to veterans and their families through support organisations at the local, state and national level.	
Professor Craig Michael Mellis	For significant service to medicine, particularly in the field of paediatrics and child health, as a clinician, and to medical education and research.	
Dr Stuart Malcolm Miller	For significant service to medicine as an otolaryngologist, through leading contributions to medical foundations, and to photography.	
Dr Wayne Robert Minter	For significant service to chiropractic health, through educational programs, clinical practice standards, and patient management.	
Rick Morse	For significant service to environmental management through erosion and sediment control practices, and to professional associations.	
Dr A James Morton	For significant service to children with Autism Spectrum Disorders through not-for-profit organisations, and to medicine in the field of oncology.	
Neil Craddock Morton	For significant service to the museums sector through leadership roles of national cultural institutions, and to public administration.	
Associate Professor Kathiravelpillai Nadanachandran	For significant service to the international community through humanitarian outreach programs, particularly health care and medical training.	
Timothy Nadjowh	For significant service to the Indigenous communities of West Arnhem Land as a leader and elder, and to the visual arts.	
Jennifer Catherine Neary	For significant service to public education through policy development and creating scholarship opportunities for teachers and students.	
George Edward Negus	For significant service to the media as a journalist and television presenter, and to conservation and the environment.	
Judith Anne Nunn	For significant service to the performing arts as a scriptwriter and actor of stage and screen, and to literature as an author.	
Sean Michael O'Boyle	For significant service to music as a composer, conductor, musician, performer and musical director.	
Pamela Anne O'Connor	For significant service to the community of Mount Gambier through a range of outreach programs, and as an author and historian.	
Professor James Robert Ogloff	For significant service to education and to the law as a forensic psychologist, and as an academic, researcher and practitioner.	
Brian Patrick O'Sullivan	For significant service to engineering in the oil and gas industry, and to support for people with muscular dystrophy.	
The Honourable Neil Albert Pope	For significant service to the community of Victoria, particularly through local and state government roles, and to the administration of Norfolk Island.	
Professor Michael Anthony Quinn	For significant service to medicine in the field of gynaecological oncology through executive roles at state, national and international levels.	
Heather Lynne Reid	For significant service to sport administration, particularly football, in the Canberra region, and as an advocate for gender equity in sport.	
Dr Robert Andrew Reid	For significant service to sports medicine through executive roles with professional organisations, and as a voluntary medical officer.	
Paul Arthur Richards	For significant service to medical radiation sciences, and to the community, particularly through providing emergency patient and family accommodation.	
Michael John Roche	For significant service to the community through a range of maritime, education, healthcare and sporting organisations, and to public administration.	
Professor Sylvia Anne Rodger	For significant service to medical education in the field of occupational therapy, and to community health as a clinician working with Autism Spectrum Disorders in children.	
Professor John Reginald Rossiter	For significant service to education and the social sciences as an academic specialising in marketing theories and television advertising.	
Jessica June Rowe	For significant service to the community as an ambassador, campaigner and advocate for mental health policy reform, and to the broadcast media.	
Alan Raymond Ruby	For significant service to international education through global reform initiatives, and to philanthropic organisations.	
Professor Michael Martin Saling	For significant service to education in the field of clinical neuropsychology as an academic, researcher and clinician.	
Ralph Robert Schulze	For significant service to primary industry through research and innovation in a range of executive roles in the cotton sector.	
Richard John Seddon	For significant service to the business sector through promoting greater international industry engagement, and to Australian rules football.	
Professor David John Shearman	For significant service to medicine in the fields of gastroenterology and environmental health, particularly the impact of global climate change.	
Dr Lawrence Maxwell Smart	For significant service to dentistry in the field of clinical orthodontics, through cleft lip and palate treatment and craniofacial surgery.	
Associate Professor Robert Ian Smee	For significant service to medicine as a radiation oncologist, and through professional organisations and leadership roles.	
Dr John Julian Smiles	For significant service to medicine as an ophthalmologist, and to international relations through eye health programs in Samoa.	
William Sinclair Smith	For significant service to the law particularly through international justice tribunals and human rights organisations.	
Winifred Mary Smith	For significant service to the community through a range of executive roles with the Australian Red Cross in Queensland.	
Stephen Charles Spargo	For significant service to the community through a range of executive roles with business, agricultural, sporting and health organisations.	
Dr Christina Meredith Steffen	For significant service to medicine as a general and vascular surgeon, particularly through research and outreach programs.	
Kevin Michael Stevenson	For significant service to business and commerce through reforms in national and international accountancy standards.	
Gerald Louis Stone	For significant service to print and broadcast media as a journalist, editor, television producer and author.	
David James Stratton	For significant service to the film industry as a critic and reviewer, and as a promoter and ambassador for Australian cinema.	
Dr Neil Eastwood Street	For significant service to medicine in the fields of paediatric anaesthesia and malignant hyperthermia, and to the people of the Asia-Pacific region through medical aid programs.	
The Honourable Brian Thomas Sully QC	For significant service to the judiciary, and to the law, particularly through legal education in New South Wales.	
Elizabeth Ann Symonds	For significant service to social justice, particularly through drug law reform, and to the Parliament of New South Wales.	
Professor Linda Clare Tapsell	For significant service to health science as an academic and clinician specialising in diet and nutrition.	
Brian George Tennant	For significant service to the community, particularly through advocacy roles for improved social justice, law reform and civil liberties.	
Barry Edward Thompson OAM	For significant service to the community, particularly through executive roles with Rotary International, and to Australian aviation history.	
Richard Graham Thorp	For significant service to architecture, particularly through the development of major public projects, and to professional organisations.	
Noel Christian Tovey	For significant service to the performing arts, to Indigenous performers, and as an advocate for the lesbian, gay, bisexual, transgender, and intersex community.	
Dr James Leonard Tulloch	For significant service to the international community, particularly through a range of health and development roles with the United Nations.	
Richard Trevor Viney	For significant service to the finance and insurance sector as a contributor to consumer protection and dispute mediation.	
Rona Diane Wade	For significant service to the information technology sector, particularly through library management and resource sharing networks, and to the community.	
Professor Merrilyn Margaret Walton	For significant service to the health care sector, particularly through policy development and reform, and to professional medical practice and standards.	
Professor John Douglas Watson	For significant service to medicine in the field of neurology, to medical education and administration, and through mentoring roles.	
Dr Graeme Watts	For significant service to people with a disability, particularly to wheelchair sports, and to health sciences education.	
Dr Gillian Ruth Webb	For significant service to community health in the field of physiotherapy, as a contributor to professional organisations, and to education.	
Robert John Wiles	For significant service to tertiary education in the field of chemical engineering as a senior academic, lecturer and mentor.	
Kathleen Eleanor Williams	For significant service to the road transport industry through policies and regulations that support a safe and responsible trucking sector.	
Dr Richard John Willis	For significant service to medicine in the field of anaesthesia, and to professional organisations.	
Ross Llewellyn Wiseman	For significant service to the community through the leadership and promotion of volunteer organisations.	
His Honour Judge Brian Edmund Withers	For significant service to the law through leadership in a range of professional organisations, and to the judiciary in South Australia.	
Lawrence William Woods DFC	For significant service to veterans through the preservation of military aviation history.	
Carolyn Mary Worth	For significant service to the community through voluntary roles with child protection organisations.	
Emeritus Professor Farhat Yusuf	For significant service to tertiary education as a specialist demographer, and to professional organisations in Australia and overseas.	

==== Military Division ====
Branch	Recipient	Citation	Notes
Navy	Captain Richard Kelson Fitzgerald RAN	For exceptional service in support of Australia's submarine capability	
Navy	Captain Guy Nicholas Holthouse RAN	For exceptional performance of duty in the field of Naval Warfare, as the Defence Attaché in Spain and Egypt, and as Deputy Commander Surface Force Australia.	
Navy	Warrant Officer Martin Holzberger CSC	For exceptional performance of duty in the field of Navy leadership and management	
Army	Colonel Timothy Bayliss	For exceptional service to the Australian Army in the fields of career management and force structure modernisation.	
Army	Colonel Bradley John McCall	For exceptional service as the Public Health Physician, Health Threat Assessment Team, 2nd Health Support Battalion, Senior Medical Officer, Headquarters 1st Division; and Director of Clinical Services, 2nd General Health Battalion.	
Army	Brigadier Daniel McDaniel DSC, DSM	For exceptional service as Commander Special Operations Command, Colonel Plans Headquarters Forces Command, and Deputy Commander International Security Assistance Force Special Operations Forces in Afghanistan.	
Army	Brigadier Andrew John Mathewson	For exceptional service in delivering aviation capability as the Project Director, Multi-Role Helicopter and Director General, Army Aviation Systems.	
Army	Colonel Scott Alexander Winter	For exceptional service through contributions to career management as the Senior Officer Manager - Army and to the development and modernisation of the Australian Army as the Commanding Officer 1st Armoured Regiment.	
Air Force	Wing Commander Darren James Goldie CSC	For exceptional service to the Royal Australian Air Force in airlift operations, and as Commanding Officer Number 37 Squadron	
Air Force	Air Vice-Marshal Leigh Andrew Gordon CSM	For exceptional service to the Australian Defence Force in aerospace logistics.	
Air Force	Wing Commander Benjamin Main	For exceptional performance of duty in aircraft engineering, sustainment and acquisition.	
Air Force	Air Commodore Robert Peter Rodgers CSM	For exceptional service to the Royal Australian Air Force in cultural change and personnel administration.	

=== Medal of the Order of Australia (OAM) ===
==== General Division ====
Recipient	Citation	Notes
Professor John Gregory Aaskov	For service to medical research in the field of infectious diseases.	
Terri Nathalie Adams	For service to the broadcast media as a volunteer radio presenter.	
Frederick Charles Ainsworth	For service to the community of the Western Downs.	
Robert Macdonald Alexander	For service to rowing as an administrator and competitor.	
Maree Margaret Anderson	For service to the community of Minlaton.	
Ronald William Anderson	For service to the petroleum retail industry.	
Mildred May Andrew	For service to children with disabilities.	
Barry James Antella	For service to the surf lifesaving movement.	
Ashley Vaughan Arbuckle	For service to the performing arts as an artistic director and classical musician.	
Group Captain Leslie James Armstrong	For service to aged welfare advocacy.	
Evan John Arnold	For service to the community of Edenhope.	
Robert Douglas Arnold	For service to veterans, and to the community.	
Allan Robert Aughey	For service to local government, and to the communities of the Clare and Gilbert Valleys.	
Dr Roderick Graham Bain	For service to veterans and their families.	
Judith Roslyn Bainbridge	For service to the community, particularly to refugees and human rights organisations.	
Arthur Robert Baker	For service to the community of Bulahdelah.	
Maisie Beatrice Baker	(Award wef 11 July 2013) For service to the community of Darebin City, and to the Uniting Church in Australia.	
Harry Barber	For service to the community as an advocate for improved cycling infrastructure.	
Alan Edward Barlow	For service to veterans and their families, and to the community.	
Joan Elizabeth Barnes	For service to the community of Longford.	
Ernest Wolfgang Barr	For service to the community, particularly through support for charitable organisations, and to the food industry.	
Elizabeth June Barraclough	For service to conservation and the environment, and as a volunteer educator.	
Wayne Brian Bass	For service to youth, and to the community of the Latrobe Valley.	
Pamela Joan Batten	For service to the community, particularly through the Country Women's Association of Western Australia.	
Dr Alan Francis Beard	For service to the community of the Hunter.	
Campbell McLean Beardsell	For service to conservation and the environment in Victoria.	
June Clarissa Beck	For service to the tourism and hospitality sector, and to the community.	
Richard Alan Begbie	For service to the community through historical and social welfare organisations.	
John Belani	For service to the community of Laverton.	
Anthony John Benbow	For service to the community through roles with Lions International.	
Mervyn Ernest Bennell	For service to sport, particularly to cricket, lawn bowls and Australian rules football.	
David Roy Bentham	For service to local government, to the community of the Hills Shire, and to business.	
Kevin Harold Berger	For service to education through specialised alternative learning programs for youth.	
Roy Harwood Billing	For service to the performing arts, particularly as an actor, and to the community.	
Kenneth Rowland Bird	For service to the community through Lions International.	
Professor Hans Henning Bode	For service to international relations through voluntary health roles in Uganda, Mozambique and Tanzania.	
Mervyn John Bourke	For service to cricket as an administrator and as a coach.	
Sholto Geddes Bowen	For service to secondary education, and to professional organisations.	
William Robert Bowring	For service to maritime history preservation, and to the community of Mannum.	
Joy Lynette Boyle	For service to community health through roles assisting people living with Parkinson's disease.	
Keith Lewis Bradby	For service to conservation and the environment in Western Australia.	
Janice Anne Bradnam	For service to community health through palliative care and youth support organisations.	
Gwenda Joan Braga	For service to the community, particularly through aged care organisations.	
Anthony Neil Brain	For service to the community of Coonabarabran.	
Peter Joseph Brennan	For service to the Irish community of New South Wales.	
Raymond Brennan	For service to the surf lifesaving movement, and to the community.	
Rae Celia Brewster	For service to the community of Streaky Bay.	
Elaine Valerie Brogan	For service to historical preservation organisations in Victoria.	
Geoffrey Alan Broughton	For service to the community of Euroa.	
Graham Patrick Brown	For service to the community of Taree.	
Juliet Helena Brown	For service to the community through roles with health, transport, financial and business organisations.	
Virgil Bugeja	For service to international relations through the Friends of Australia Association in Malta.	
Vanessa Elizabeth Bull	For service to the community of Beaudesert.	
John Burgess	(Award wef 25 June 2013) For service to veterans and their families.	
Lieutenant Colonel John David Burrows	For service to veterans and their families.	
Myann Joan Burrows	For service to the community of Redland.	
Desleigh Barbara Butler	For service to the community through support for charitable organisations.	
Dawn Heather Byatt	For service to the community of the Tumut region.	
Stephen James Byrne	For service to the community of the Northern Beaches.	
Albert James Callcott	For service to the community of Charters Towers, and to local government.	
Susan Margaret Campbell	For service to conservation and the environment.	
Peter Joseph Cannon	For service to the community through fire and emergency services organisations.	
Gwenyth May Carpenter	For service to lawn bowls.	
William Bernard Carrington	For service to the community of Traralgon.	
Margaret Susan Carroll	For service to rural and regional communities in New South Wales, and to women.	
Robert Francis Carroll	For service to youth, particularly through cadet and juvenile justice organisations.	
Denis John Chamberlain	For service to veterans and their families, and to the community of Bathurst.	
William Hardman Chapman	For service to industrial relations, particularly in the mining industry.	
Howard Pendrill Charles	For service to the community of Nimmitabel.	
Annabelle Katharine Chauncy	For service to the international community through the School for Life Foundation, Uganda.	
Kenneth Kin Tuck Cheung	For service to the Chinese community of Queensland.	
Dr Franklin T K Chew	For service to the Chinese community of Victoria, and to medicine.	
Trevor Douglas Clark	For service to the community of Exeter.	
Albert William Clarke	For service to Indigenous health, and to sport.	
Norma Isabel Clarke	For service to lawn bowls.	
Leonie Jane Clyne	For service to tertiary and vocational education, and to business.	
Brian Neil Cobus	For service to the Indigenous community of the Cape York Peninsula.	
Michael Francis Coffey	For service to business and commerce, and to the community.	
Jonathan Harry Coleman	For service to the broadcast media industry, and to the community.	
The Reverend Father Vincent Paul Coleman	For service to the Catholic Church in Australia, and to refugee support organisations.	
Jill Maureen Colyer	For service to community health through advocacy roles.	
Margaret Dorothy Combs	For service to the community through historical, sporting and emergency services organisations.	
Ian Alexander Cooper	For service to the community of Traralgon.	
Renato Coscia	For service to the Italian community of South Australia.	
Michael John Cosgrove	For service to the community of the Darling Downs, and to local government.	
Vincent John Cosgrove	For service to veterans and their families, and to education.	
Dr Brian David Cuming	For service to environmental conservation in the Westernport region.	
Nanette Cuming	For service to the Australian native plant industry, and to the community.	
Rosemary Elizabeth Dalton	For service to nursing, and to medical education.	
Garry John Davey	For service to the community through a range of volunteer roles.	
Amanda Yvette Davidson	For service to maternal health research.	
Richard Anthony Davies	For service to the community of Warrandyte.	
Raymond Kingsley Davis	For service to the community through youth and heritage organisations, and to the law.	
Patricia Enid De Carle	For service to the community through art programs in hospitals.	
Robyn Louise Dealtry	For service to nursing, and to medical education.	
Kirsten Elizabeth Deane	For service to people with a disability through support organisations.	
Sylvia Edith Deutsch	For service to women, and to the Jewish community.	
Lesley Joy Dimmick	For service to the visual arts, particularly through administrative roles.	
Geoffrey Nelson Dinning	For service to the community of Wangaratta.	
Maria-Lourdes Doronila	For service to the community through social welfare and cultural organisations.	
Laura Lavenia Double	For service to the communities of Campbell Town and Ross.	
Phillip Joseph Dowler	For service to the community of Central Queensland.	
Wendy Elizabeth Downes	For service to the community of the Whitsundays, and to recreational running.	
Brennon James Dowrick	For service to gymnastics.	
Beryl Jean Driver	For service to the community through charitable initiatives.	
Sarah Louise Duncan	For service to rugby union, particularly as a referee.	
Dr Malcolm Victor Dunjey	For service to medical administration, and to the community.	
Robert Weir Dunn	For service to people with a disability.	
Denise Elizabeth Durnford	For service to veterans and their families.	
Douglas John Eaton	For service to local government, and to the community of the Central Coast.	
Joan Victoria Edwards	For service to people with a disability.	
Wallace Frederick Edwards	For service to the community through a range of organisations.	
Kenneth George Eldridge	For service to the communities of Tweed Heads and Murwillumbah.	
David Henry Everett	For service to the international community through the School for Life Foundation, Uganda.	
Moustafa Fahour	For service to the visual arts and to cross-cultural relations.	
Brian Terence Falconer	For service to the community of Carlton.	
Anthony Fearnside	For service to the community of the Australian Capital Territory.	
Peter James Felton	For service to veterans and their families.	
Armando Tony Ficarra	For service to education, and to the community.	
Barbara Ann Finch	For service to the community of Armidale through reconciliation and social justice organisations.	
Shirley Ann Fisher	For service to environmental education, and to the community.	
Mavis Kathleen Fitzgerald	For service to the community of Port Pirie through social welfare organisations.	
Wesley Jon Fleming	For service to the horticultural industry, and to landscape architecture.	
Captain Ernest Alfred Flint	For service to veterans and their families.	
David John Forbes	For service to yachting.	
Kingsley Reece Francis	For service to the community of Port Pirie.	
Walter George Franklin	For service to sport, and to the community of Tamworth.	
Daele Fraser	For service to the performing arts, particularly dance.	
Malcolm Edward French	For service to conservation and the environment in Western Australia.	
Edna Pearl Fuller	For service to the community of Casino through a range of volunteer roles.	
Charles Clemens Furphy	For service to health care, and to the community of the Goulburn Valley.	
Evangeline Galettis	For service to the community, particularly to educational institutions.	
Paul Anthony Gallagher	For service to children through charitable paediatric care organisations.	
Sister Veronica Anne Gallagher	For service to music education, and to the Catholic Church in Australia.	
Joan Pamela Garner	For service to the community through the conservation and preservation of the Ballarat Botanical Gardens.	
Helen Margaret Garske	For service to the community of Armidale.	
Allan Raymond Gibson	For service to youth, and to the community.	
Karen Jane Gibson	For service to the Indigenous community of the Cape York Peninsula.	
Victor Patrick Gibson	For service to the Indigenous community of the Cape York Peninsula.	
Stanley William Gilchrist	For service to cricket, and to the community.	
Beverley Ann Giles	For service to community health through dementia care and education training programs.	
Laurence John Gleeson	For service to the community of the Goulburn Valley.	
Efrem Eli Goldhammer	For service to medical research organisations through fundraising roles.	
David Goldstone	For service to the community through charitable and service groups.	
Elizabeth Anne Golec	For service to youth through the Scouting movement.	
Harry Thomas Gooden	For service to the road transport industry, and to the community.	
Anthony Alan Gorringe	For service to lawn bowls, and to people who are deaf or hard of hearing.	
Pastor Sonny Graham	For service to the Indigenous community of Western Australia.	
Phillip Edward Greagen	For service to local government, and to the community of Port Augusta.	
Michael John Greenwood	For service to local government, and to the community of Parkes.	
Ronald Irwin Gretton	For service to the community through the preservation of military aviation heritage.	
Maree Ann Grieve	For service to the community through charitable initiatives.	
Bernard Alvin Gross	For service to local government, and to the community of Horsham.	
Timothy Francis Gurry	For service to education, and to the community.	
Lesley Maria Hall	(Award wef 15 August 2013) For service to people with a disability through a range of executive roles.	
William Halliday	For service to the surf lifesaving movement.	
Maureen Lorraine Hamilton	For service to the community, particularly through fundraising roles.	
Robert Gay Harbourd	For service to veterans and their families.	
Frank Conroy Harding	(Award wef 8 July 2014) For service to education, and to the community of Busselton.	
The Reverend Monsignor Eugene Joseph Harley	For service to the Catholic Church in Australia.	
Selwyn John Harley	For service to motor sport, and to the community of Norwood.	
Andrew David Harper	For service to environmental science and research, and to adventure tourism.	
Ian Nathan Harris	For service to the community, particularly through support for newly arrived immigrants.	
Doreen Margaret Hart	For service to the Indigenous community of the Cape York Peninsula.	
Marcia Ann Hatfield	For service to the media, particularly to children's television and to publishing.	
Damian James Head	For service to agricultural education, and to sport.	
Maureen Barbara Hearn	For service to the community of Eldorado.	
Aileen Veronica Heathwood	For service to the community as a volunteer court liaison coordinator.	
John Francis Heeps	For service to the community through social justice roles.	
Barry John Heffernan	For service to veterans and their families.	
The Reverend Dr John Frederick Hely	For service to the Uniting Church in Australia, and to the community.	
Irene Miriam Hendel	For service to community health through cancer support organisations.	
Craig Anthony Herbert	For service to basketball as an administrator, coach and player.	
William Lawrence Hetherington	For service to agricultural irrigation, and to the community of Deniliquin.	
Yvonne Avis Hill	For service to competitive rifle and pistol shooting, and to the community.	
Dr David Lockhart Hilliard	For service to education through the study of the history of religion.	
James Taylor Hodgkinson	For service to people with a disability, and to business.	
Cheryl Gladys Holmes	For service to the community through health care chaplaincy roles.	
John David Hopkins	For service to golf, and to the minerals and resources sector.	
Carroll Howe	For service to the community of Ku-ring-gai.	
Alastair Charles Hunter	For service to the arts, aged care and social welfare organisations.	
Kenneth Arthur Hurling	For service to competitive sailing.	
Thomas Roger Hurrey	For service to the community of Whittlesea.	
Keri Lawson Huxley	For service to local government, and to the community.	
Ronald William Iddles	For service to the community of Victoria through representational roles with service organisations.	
Mike Jackson	For service to the performing arts as a musician, composer and entertainer.	
Peter Jarvis	For service to the community, particularly through Lions International.	
Stanley Norman Jeffery	For service to veterans and their families.	
Brian Lloyd Jenkins	For service to print media, particularly journalism, and to the community.	
Geoffrey Paul Jenkins	For service to the community of Ballarat through a range of roles.	
Clive Francis Johnson	For service to military history, and to education.	
Annemarie Jones	For service to local government, and to the community of Wellington.	
Maxwell David Kahn	For service to aged care.	
Sidney Mihkel Kallas	For service to the community of Cowra, and to rugby league.	
Kenneth Joseph Kelman	For service to the community through St John Ambulance.	
Helen Elizabeth Kenney	For service to the communities of Nillumbik and St Andrews.	
Michael John Keogh	For service to agriculture, and to regional development.	
May Mary Kepple	For service to the Indigenous community of the Cape York Peninsula.	
Edgar Andrew Kerindun	For service to the Indigenous community of the Cape York Peninsula.	
George Khouzame	(Award wef 13 December 2013) For service to the Lebanese community of New South Wales.	
Charlie King	For service to the broadcast media, and to the Indigenous community of the Northern Territory.	
Pamela Margaret Kinsman	For service to youth through international education programs.	
Frances Maria Klaassen	For service to children and families through social welfare organisations.	
Efthymia (Effy) Kleanthi	For service to social welfare organisations, and to women.	
Leslie Robin Kleinschmidt	For service to education, and to the Lutheran Church of Australia.	
Barry Reginald Klose	For service to the community of Lobethal through a range of organisations.	
Vera Deborah Koomeeta	For service to the Indigenous community of the Cape York Peninsula.	
Clara Dora Korompay	For service to aged care, and to the Hungarian community of Sydney.	
Steven Kyritsis	For service to veterans and their families, and to the Greek community of Melbourne.	
Edward Robert Landon	For service to the community of Albury, and to health care organisations.	
Bernadette Christina Lane	For service to social welfare, and to the community of Burleigh Heads.	
The Reverend Anthony Dunmore Lang	For service to the Presbyterian Church of Australia.	
Denise Christine Langton	For service to the community through the Grandparents for Grandchildren organisation.	
Brian Richard Larking	For service to a range of cultural, social welfare and educational bodies.	
Andrew William Lazaris	For service to sport, particularly to basketball administration.	
Denise Anne Lees	For service to the surf lifesaving movement.	
Clive (Tony) Anthony Levy	For service to the community through aged care and social welfare organisations.	
Dr Serge Israel Liberman	For service to literature as an author, historian and scholar.	
Elaine Louise Liddy	For service to the Indigenous community of the Cape York Peninsula.	
Chieu Lim	For service to the community of Bankstown.	
Adrian John Lipscomb	For service to the community of Bellingen.	
Neil Bruce Loftus	For service to the community of the Manning Valley, and to veterans.	
Guang Rong Lu	For service to the performing arts as a director, performer and aerial designer.	
Alan Gordon Lucas	For service to the print media as an author of maritime publications.	
Dr George Zbigniew Luk-Kozika	For service to the Polish community of Victoria.	
Susanne Marie Macdonald	For service to the surf lifesaving movement.	
Jack Carr Mackay	For service to the veterans and their families, and to the community.	
Brian Michael Maher	For service to the community through social welfare organisations.	
Carolyn Maree Maher	For service to the community through a range of social welfare organisations.	
Roger Edwin Male	For service to the community, to business and commerce, and to the financial sector.	
Kim Gardner Maloney	For service to the community through social welfare organisations, and to the hotels industry.	
Rosemary Joan Mann	For service to the community, particularly as a hospital volunteer.	
Denis William Marshall	For service to aged welfare, and to the community.	
Egilberto Martin	For service to the Italian community of Victoria.	
Captain Geoffrey Paul Martin	For service to the community through the preservation of naval history.	
Professor Paul Russell Martin	For service to medicine in the field of psychology.	
Margaret Claire Martlew	For service to the communities of Port Elliot and Victor Harbor.	
Henry Kenneth Matheson	For service to the community of Finley.	
Geoffrey Kenneth Matthews	For service to Australian military aviation heritage.	
Brian Edward Mattner	For service to the community, and to emergency service organisations.	
Paul Mavroudis	For service to the Greek community of Victoria.	
Garry James May	For service to youth, and to the community.	
Audrey Dawn McArdle	For service to the community of Tingha, and to local government.	
Beres McCallum	For service to the community through the preservation of local history.	
Richard Francis McCarthy	For service to the community of the Southern Highlands.	
Jennifer Ann McCombe	For service to the community, particularly through youth organisations.	
Gareth McCray	For service to the community, to radio broadcasting, and to education.	
Graeme Ronald McDermott	For service to the community of Oatlands.	
Anthony Garry McDonald	For service to the community of the Adelaide Hills.	
Anthony James McGinn	For service to the community, particularly through fundraising events.	
Peter Robert McGregor	For service to the communities of Burleigh Heads and Ulverstone.	
Barry Kym McHugh	For service to local government, and the community of the Fleurieu Peninsula.	
Brian Lindsay McKinlay	For service to the community through fire and emergency services.	
Darren James McManus-Smith	For service to veterans and their families.	
Suzanne Jane McSolvin	For service to lacrosse.	
Michael John Mercovich	For service to the community of South Morang.	
Johannes Franciscus Meuris	For service to the international community through humanitarian aid programs in Fiji.	
Maria Meuris	For service to the international community through humanitarian aid programs in Fiji.	
Jean Frances Miles	For service to the community, particularly through the Country Women's Association.	
Kathleen Mary Milford	For service to the community of the Hunter.	
Alice June Millar	For service to the Anglican Church of Australia, and to the community.	
Keith Campbell Millar	For service to the Anglican Church of Australia, and to the community.	
Barbara Maureen Mitchell	For service to the international community of Bangladesh through humanitarian medical programs.	
Susan Jane Muddiman	For service to the museums and galleries sector in regional New South Wales.	
Robin Anthony Murphy	For service to the building and construction industry, and to the community.	
William Alfred Murray	For service to the community, particularly through fire and emergency services.	
Sister Patricia Edith Nagle	For service to the Catholic Church in Australia, and to education.	
Barry Nash	For service to veterans and their families, and to the community of Ballina.	
Lieutenant Colonel Peter Thomas Newman	For service to veterans, and to the community.	
Angela Maree Newton	For service to the community of Harrow.	
Diane Christine Nicholls	For service to education.	
Leila Jean Nichols	For service to the community of Nubeena.	
Richard John Niven	For service to local government, and to the community of Orange.	
Frederick William O'Connor	For service to athletics.	
Margaret Barbara O'Driscoll	For service to the community, and to nursing.	
Carole Oliver	For service to the performing arts through dance education.	
Dorothy Joan Osborne	For service to the community of Innamincka.	
John Harold Osborne	For service to the community of Innamincka.	
Thomas Paradissis	(Award wef 12 July 2013) For service to the Greek community of south east Queensland.	
James Radcliffe Parish	For service to community broadcasting in Tasmania.	
Bruce James Parker	For service to women's sports ground administration.	
Professor Derek Xavier Parkin	For service to accountancy through a range of professional, academic, business and advisory roles.	
Major Leslie Walter Partridge	For service to veterans and their families.	
Kenneth Leonard Paton	For service to the community, particularly to youth through the Scouting movement.	
Dr Glen Stephen Patten	For service to the surf lifesaving movement, and to nutritional science.	
Allan Lindsay Paull	For service to the community through charitable and social welfare organisations.	
Valerie Joan Pell	For service to the community of Box Hill.	
Peter Pedro Peter	For service to the Indigenous community of the Cape York Peninsula.	
Selwyn Ian Pfeffer	For service to the community of Boonah.	
Jacqueline Sally Phillips	For service to community health in Numurkah.	
Glenys Margaret Phillpot	For service to the community of Warrnambool.	
Stanislaw Pilecki	For service to rugby union football.	
Kerry Elizabeth Pinnell	For service to agricultural education, and to equestrian sports.	
June Georgina Poland	(Award wef 24 September 2013) For service to the community of Woollahra.	
Lorraine Mary Pomery	For service to the community of Port Elliot.	
Doris Komben Poonkamelya	For service to the Indigenous community of the Cape York Peninsula.	
Dr William Leith Porges	For service to tertiary education, and to veterinary science.	
Garry Lloyd Port	For service to the Indigenous community of the Cape York Peninsula.	
Dr Margaret Jean Pride	For service to the performing arts, particularly through choral music.	
Bruce Henry Pyke	For service to the community through a range of organisations.	
Felicity Ann Pyke	For service to the community through charitable organisations.	
Dr Margaret Juliet Redelman	For service to medicine, particularly in the field of sexual health.	
Ian John Reeves	For service to cricket and Australian rules football.	
John Melville Reid	For service to aged care, and to the community of Busselton.	
June Elizabeth Reid	For service to the community, particularly through the Country Women's Association.	
June Lorraine Retallack	For service to youth particularly through the Guiding movement.	
Robert William Richards	For service to the community, and to a range of service groups.	
Sally Lee Richards	For service to people with a disability.	
Leslie John Ridd	For service to the community of Molesworth.	
David John Ridgewell	For service to the community of Manilla.	
Dr Kathryn Louise Robinson	For service to medicine in the field of haematology.	
Lynette Rolfe	For service to the community, and to veterans and their families.	
Dr Alan Thomas Rose	For service to medicine, and to professional organisations.	
Diana Rose	For service to the community of Taree.	
Valerie Jean Rose	For service to community health.	
Helen Marjorie Ross	For service to the community of Port Macquarie.	
John Ernest Ross	For service to music as an educator, musician, and choral director and composer.	
Raymond John Rouhan	For service to veterans and their families.	
Milton Keith Rowe	For service to the Uniting Church in Australia.	
Doris Winifred Rowland	For service to music education as an eisteddfod convenor and teacher.	
John Joseph Rumball	For service to the community of the Hunter, and to ambulance organisations.	
The Reverend Father Terence John Rush	For service to the Catholic Church in Tasmania.	
Peter James Ryan	For service to conservation and the environment of the Malabar Headland.	
Judith Ada Ryles	For service to the community of Melbourne.	
Sam Salcman	For service to the community through a range of Jewish organisations.	
Bobbi Jo Sawyer	For service to Indigenous mental health, particularly women and children.	
Rosemarie Edgar Say	For service to community health, particularly mental health services, through chaplaincy and counselling organisations.	
Patrick Michael Scallan	For service to local government, and to the community of Bridgetown-Greenbushes.	
Norman Schueler	For service to the multicultural community of South Australia.	
Adjunct Professor Jennifer Marie Searcy	For service to education in the disciplines of science and mathematics.	
Nathan Shafir	For service to the community through a range of organisations.	
Maurice James Sharkey	For service to the community of Bendigo, and to local government.	
Patricia Anne Sheffer	For service to children with special needs through early intervention programs.	
Eve Forrest Sheppard	For service to the community through fundraising support for mental health organisations.	
Guy Tyndall Sheppard	(Award wef 24 March 2014) For service to the community through fundraising support for mental health organisations.	
Margaret Anne Shimmin	For service to the community of Warrnambool.	
Geoffrey Pierce Simpson	For service to veterans and their families, and to service groups.	
Peter William Skewes	For service to local government, and to the community of Blackall.	
Gene Smith	For service to the community through aged care and charitable bodies.	
James Thomas Smith	For service to animal welfare organisations, and to the community.	
Noel Smith	(Award wef 19 June 2013) For service to veterans and their families.	
Garry James Snowden	For service to the conservation of historic sites of Australian military significance.	
Rachael Pamela Sporn	For service to basketball, and to the community.	
Loretta Mary Spratt	For service to the Indigenous community of the Cape York Peninsula.	
James Leonard Stackpoole	For service to sport, particularly martial arts, and to youth.	
Margaret Ann Stafford	For service to the Anglican Church in Australia, and to the community.	
Richard John Stewart	For service to social welfare organisations, and to the accounting profession.	
Mark Douglas Strachan	For service to broadcast media, and to the community of Port Macquarie.	
Ian Edward Stromborg	For service to local government, and to the community of Bankstown.	
Alan Charles Stuart	For service to the community of East Gippsland.	
Lindy Dunlop Stuart	For service to charitable organisations, and to the community.	
Gregory Lynton Sugars	For service to the community of Frankston.	
Margaret Anne Sulman	For service to the community as a hospital volunteer.	
Associate Professor Dr Geoffrey Strafford Sutherland	For service to engineering, and to education.	
Dr Graeme Douglas Swincer	For service to the community through humanitarian support organisations.	
Walter Ross Synot	For service to sport, and to the community of Geelong.	
Christopher Brian Tanner	For service to education, and to the community of Gladstone.	
Marion Ethel Taunton	For service to lawn bowls.	
Maurice Anthony Taylor	For service to the community through counselling and grief support organisations.	
Alison Helen Teese	For service to conservation and the environment in Victoria.	
Carmel Anne Thomas	For service to people with enduring mental illness through assisted long-term housing initiatives.	
Pamela Rosemary Thomas	For service to the communities of Narrabri and Hervey Bay.	
Allan Roy Thomson	For service to environmental conservation through a range of organisations.	
Colin Frank Thomson	For service to environmental water management, and to the community.	
Fergus Douglas Thomson	For service to local government, and to the community of the Eurobodalla Shire.	
Prudence Margaret Thomson	For service to people with disabilities.	
Wendy Susan Tisdell	For service to international relations through water infrastructure programs.	
Antony Reginald Todman	For service to children with sight and hearing impairments, and to the community.	
Barry Ronald Tonkin	For service to engineering through professional bodies, and to the community.	
Lorraine Ingrid Topol	(Award wef 30 January 2014) For service to the community through social welfare, religious and charitable organisations.	
Carmel Louise Torenius	For service to local government, and to the community of Sorell.	
Mark Allen Troy	For service to local government, and to the community of Bellingen.	
Janet Tyler	For service to nursing, particularly in the field of spinal injury rehabilitation.	
Jeffrey Thomas Underhill	For service to the community, and to charitable organisations.	
Keith Charles Uptin	For service to the community of Port Macquarie.	
John Clement Usher	For service to public transport in Victoria and Tasmania.	
Pieter Willem Van Der Kamp	For service to youth through the Scouting movement.	
Anton Johan Van Doornik	For service to the community of Geelong.	
Lyndell Garneta Van Noort	For service to the community of Ku-ring-gai.	
Anthony Nickolas Versace	For service to the community, and to the Catholic Church in Australia.	
Stanley Terence Vesper	For service to the history of the surf lifesaving movement in Australia.	
Christopher Gavin Viner-Smith	For service to community history, particularly through securing recognition for Patrol Officers in pre-independence Papua New Guinea.	
Anne Louise Virgo	For service to the visual arts, particularly printmaking.	
Alverna Mae Walkom	For service to the community of Taree.	
The Reverend Edward James Walter	For service to the Australian Baptist Ministry.	
Dr David Barton Warden	For service to medicine as a general practitioner.	
Diana Muriel Warnock	For service to the community, and to the Parliament of Western Australia.	
Patricia June Waters	For service to women, and to the community of Port Macquarie.	
Florence Watson	For service to the Indigenous community of Queensland.	
John Geoffrey Watson	For service to aged welfare in the Geelong region.	
Richard Griffith Weatherly	For service to the visual arts, and to conservation and the environment.	
Owen Kenneth Webb	For service to the automotive events and exhibition industry, and to the community.	
Claire Ethel Welch	For service to the community of Mount Gambier.	
Ian David Wells	For service to the community of Mount Mee.	
Professor Roderick Alan Westerman	(Award wef 31 May 2012) For service to aerospace medicine.	
Edna Joyce Wheaton	For service to the community of Kangaroo Island.	
Mark Richard White	For service to the community of Penrith through the Museum of Fire.	
Robyn Ann White	For service to the community through Inner Wheel Australia.	
Margaret Ann Whitehead	For service to the community of Port Fairy.	
Flora Wickham	For service to the community as a hospital volunteer.	
Judith Tova Wilkenfeld	For service to the community through a range of Jewish organisations.	
David Milton Williams	For service to the community of Singleton.	
Vivienne Lorraine Williams	For service to the welfare and protection of animals, and to the community.	
Eric Bunting Wilson	For service to veterans and their families.	
Herbert Francis Wilson	(Award wef 5 May 2014) For service to the thoroughbred racing industry.	
Sarah Wolmby	For service to the Indigenous community of the Cape York Peninsula.	
Esther Frances Wood	For service to education, and to hockey.	
Dr Walter Barry Wood	For service to medical education, and to the community.	
Ada Panawya Woolla	For service to the Indigenous community of the Cape York Peninsula.	
Dorothea Olive Worboys	For service to the community of Foster.	
Philip Worthy	For service to aged care support organisations in the Sunshine Coast region.	
Lorna Mary Wright	For service to the community of Concord.	
Peter David Wright	For service to the sport of squash through a range of executive roles.	
Dr Simon John Young	For service to paediatric emergency medicine.	
Agnes Zillner	For service to community health through support for people with Tourette syndrome.	

==== Military Division ====
Branch	Recipient	Citation	Notes
Navy	Commander Cameron Trevor Eastman RANR	For meritorious performance of duty in the field of shore and training infrastructure.	
Army	Warrant Officer Class One D.	For meritorious performance of duty as a Regimental Sergeant Major on Operation Slipper and in Special Operations Command.	
Army	Warrant Officer Class One Richard Alan Hardy	For meritorious service as the Plans Warrant Officer within multiple postings as part of 1st Joint Movements Group, including operational service.	
Army	Warrant Officer Class One Shane Brian McPhee	For meritorious service as Regimental Sergeant Major of the 1st/19th Battalion, the Royal New South Wales Regiment, and the 3rd Battalion, the Royal Australian Regiment.	
Army	Corporal Thomas Michael O'Connor	For meritorious service as a Combat Engineer conducting search operations during three deployments on Operation SLIPPER.	
Army	Major Mark David Wonnacott	For meritorious service to the Australian Army in the fields of training and career management.	
Air Force	Air Commodore Robert Noel Lawson	For meritorious service as Officer Commanding Strike Reconnaissance Systems Program Office and Director General Airlift and Tanker Systems.	

== Meritorious Service ==
=== Public Service Medal (PSM) ===
Public Service Medal ribbon

Service	Recipient	Citation
Australian Public Service	Dr Simon Andrew Barter	For outstanding public service to aircraft accident investigation and safety, in particular the area of metal fatigue in military aircraft, and the development of differentially corrected GPS based debris mapping.
Australian Public Service	Margaret Mary Carmody	For outstanding public service through contributions to improving the lives of people with permanent and significant disability, and longstanding and distinguished service to public administration in the area of social services.
Australian Public Service	Marion Estelle Grant	For outstanding public service through exceptional leadership of ongoing reform and modernisation of Australia's customs and border protection arrangements.
Australian Public Service	Timothy Hugh Pilgrim	For outstanding public service in the development and implementation of major reforms to the Privacy Act 1988.
Australian Public Service	Saravanamuthu Ponnampalam	For outstanding public service in the area of patent examination.
Australian Public Service	Amanda Louise Ritchie	For outstanding public service leading to increased employment participation of job seekers with disabilities, injuries and health conditions.
Australian Public Service	Penny Williams	For outstanding public service in the role of Australia's inaugural Global Ambassador for Women and Girls.
New South Wales	Anita Lesley Anderson	For outstanding public service to social justice, worker's compensation, and improved access to government services in regional areas of New South Wales.
New South Wales	Norman Angelkovic	For outstanding public service to the community of New South Wales through the provision of financial and human resources for the State Crime Command.
New South Wales	Raymond Paul Brownlee	For outstanding public service in New South Wales through executive roles with a range of local councils, and to the introduction of water conservation practices.
New South Wales	Peter Bernard De Natris	For outstanding public service to people with disabilities in New South Wales, and through improved employment opportunities for young people.
New South Wales	Arthur Diakos	For outstanding public service to the transport services sector in New South Wales through senior financial planning and management roles.
New South Wales	Marwan El-Chamy	For outstanding public service in New South Wales, particularly in the area of natural resource management and water legislation compliance.
New South Wales	Eric Ian Groom	For outstanding public service to regulatory economics and reform in New South Wales, to greenhouse gas abatement, and to consumer protection.
New South Wales	Michele Hall	For outstanding public service to education in New South Wales, and through improving outcomes for Indigenous students from disadvantaged rural and remote areas.
New South Wales	Christopher John Presland	For outstanding public service to education in New South Wales, particularly through leadership roles, to improved professional standards and certification, and to student performance.
New South Wales	Rodney Glenn Towney	For outstanding public service to education and employment opportunities for Indigenous youth in New South Wales, and through contributions to local government and community organisations.
New South Wales	Anthony Thomas Whitfield	For outstanding public service to public sector financial performance and reporting as Deputy Auditor General of New South Wales.
Victoria	Kurt Steve Butyn	For outstanding public service to education in Victoria, particularly as Principal of Werribee Secondary College.
Victoria	Peter William Farrell	For outstanding public service through leadership roles during and after major fire events in regional Victoria.
Victoria	Peter James Greenwell	For outstanding public service to education in Victoria, and to the development of programs to improve educational outcomes for disadvantaged youth.
Victoria	Francis John Mickan	For outstanding public service to the primary industry sector in Victoria, through the introduction of strategies to improve dairy farming practices.
Victoria	Michelle Louise Seddon	For outstanding public service to community correctional services in Victoria, particularly through the introduction of innovative and accessible justice delivery programs.
Victoria	Janice Rosemary Snell	For outstanding public service in Victoria, particularly to people in rural and regional communities, through improved governance and delivery of social welfare programs and services.
Victoria	Graeme Kenneth Turner	For outstanding public service to conservation and the environment in Victoria, through the development of sustainable water security and resource management programs and policy.
Queensland	Raymond John Burton	For outstanding public service to local government, including to the Townsville City Council.
Queensland	Associate Professor Charles Patrick Denaro	For outstanding public service to Queensland Health.
Queensland	John Wilson Forster	For outstanding public service to Queensland Corrective Services.
Queensland	Peter Neville Rule AM, RFD	For outstanding public service to local and state government in Queensland.
Queensland	Aneurin Rhys Thomas RFD	For outstanding public service to the Queensland community through the provision of public oral health services.
Western Australia	Alexander George Errington	For outstanding public service to land conservation and environmental preservation in Western Australia through policy development and senior management roles.
Western Australia	David John Hartley	For outstanding public service to the forest products industry in Western Australia through sustainable management, corporate governance, and market development.
Western Australia	Gail Josephine Milner	For outstanding public service to community health and aged care reform in Western Australia, particularly through the establishment and implementation of innovative clinical programs.
South Australia	Vaughan John Levitzke	For outstanding public service in the area of waste management reform and policy.
South Australia	Christine Elizabeth Russell	For outstanding public service in the provision of emergency health care and remote dialysis services across regional South Australia.
Australian Capital Territory	Grace Annette Dunlop	For outstanding public service to primary education in the Australian Capital Territory, as an advocate for gifted and talented students.
Australian Capital Territory	Donald Bryden Fletcher	For outstanding public service to conservation and the environment, particularly through significant contributions to ecological research, innovation and management.
Australian Capital Territory	Roslyn May Hayes	For outstanding public service to people with a disability in the Australian Capital Territory through policy development and reform.
Northern Territory	John Anthony Coleman	For outstanding public service to the community of the Northern Territory, and through parliamentary advisory roles.
Northern Territory	Ernest Charles Wanka	For outstanding public service to infrastructure planning in the Northern Territory, particularly the design, construction and maintenance of the road transport network.

=== Australian Police Medal (APM) ===
Australian Police Medal ribbon

Branch	Recipient
Australian Federal Police	Commander Brian Samuel McDonald
Australian Federal Police	Commander Paul Sheldon Osborne
New South Wales Police Force	Senior Constable Anthony George Bell
New South Wales Police Force	Inspector Mark Bradley Hargreaves
New South Wales Police Force	Sergeant John Charles Keough
New South Wales Police Force	Inspector Bruce Sydney McGregor
New South Wales Police Force	Detective Superintendent Greig Newbery
New South Wales Police Force	Senior Sergeant Leslie Michael Nugent
New South Wales Police Force	Superintendent Clinton Murray Pheeney
New South Wales Police Force	Superintendent Karen Leanne Webb
New South Wales Police Force	Assistant Commissioner Gary Ronald Worboys
Victoria Police	Assistant Commissioner Kevin Patrick Casey
Victoria Police	Assistant Commissioner Robert John Hill
Victoria Police	Detective Inspector Michael John Hughes
Victoria Police	Senior Sergeant Paul Martin Mellick
Victoria Police	Assistant Commissioner Shane Andrew Patton
Victoria Police	Senior Sergeant Marilynn Ross
Queensland Police Service	Sergeant Elizabeth Watson Burns-Hutchison
Queensland Police Service	Detective Sergeant Samantha Garrett
Queensland Police Service	Superintendent Russell David Miller
Queensland Police Service	Superintendent Dale Richard Pointon
Queensland Police Service	Senior Sergeant Janelle Maree Poole
Queensland Police Service	Senior Sergeant Stephen Richard Trotter
Western Australia Police	Superintendent John Ashley Ballantyne
Western Australia Police	Inspector Kerry Mae French
Western Australia Police	Sergeant Jodie Romayne Pearson
Western Australia Police	Superintendent Bradley James Royce
Western Australia Police	Inspector Kim Judith Travers
South Australia Police	Sergeant Darren Bails
South Australia Police	Chief Superintendent Scott Jonathon Duval
South Australia Police	Detective Senior Sergeant Tracey Anne Murphy
Tasmania Police	Detective Senior Constable Robyn Joan Button
Tasmania Police	Inspector Laurence John Huxley
Northern Territory Police	Commander Bruce Douglas Porter
Northern Territory Police	Superintendent Robert William Rennie

=== Australian Fire Service Medal (AFSM) ===
Australian Fire Service Medal ribbon

Branch	Recipient
Federal	David Charles Brooks
New South Wales	Kevin Charles Adams
New South Wales	Clayton Pearce Allison
New South Wales	Peter Warwick Conn
New South Wales	Phillip Craig Etienne
New South Wales	Harmen Kampman
New South Wales	Jayson Anthony McKellar
New South Wales	Craig Anthony Robertson
New South Wales	Thomas John Sturgeon
New South Wales	Andre Franciscus Van Hoeck
New South Wales	Ralph Frank Walker
Victoria	Rachel Mary Dawkins
Victoria	Graeme Raymond Gant
Victoria	Andrew Edmund Gillham
Victoria	Gary William Harker
Victoria	Jamie Mackenzie
Victoria	Ivan Peter Smith
Queensland	Dr Michael Bruce Logan
Queensland	Geoffrey Clifford Richardson
Western Australia	Roger Inskip Armstrong
Western Australia	Robert Joseph Papalia
South Australia	Rodney Fraser Campbell
South Australia	Darren John Chapman
South Australia	Glen Alan Cook
South Australia	Gregory Ronald Napier
Tasmania	John Edward Duggan
Tasmania	Jeffrey Andrew Harper
Tasmania	John Alexander White

=== Ambulance Service Medal (ASM) ===
Ambulance Service Medal ribbon

Branch	Recipient
New South Wales Ambulance Services	Brian Joseph Parsell
New South Wales Ambulance Services	Phillip Peter Proust
Victorian Ambulance Services	Prof Stephen Anthony Bernard
Victorian Ambulance Services	Ralph Casey
Victorian Ambulance Services	Justin Michael Dunlop
Victorian Ambulance Services	Andrew Henery McDonell
Victorian Ambulance Services	Ian Vernon Rogers
Victorian Ambulance Services	Michael William Stepensen
Queensland Ambulance Services	Craig Vaughn Jackson
Queensland Ambulance Services	Wayne Vaughn Jackson
Western Australian Ambulance Services	Deborah Gail Jackson
Western Australian Ambulance Services	Robert Stewart James
Western Australian Ambulance Services	Graham Oliver Jones
South Australian Ambulance Services	James Douglas Bartlett
South Australian Ambulance Services	Paul Douglas Clark
Tasmanian Ambulance Services	Janny O'Keefe

=== Emergency Services Medal (ESM) ===
Emergency Services Medal ribbon

Branch	Recipient
New South Wales Emergency Services	Gerald George Burnage
New South Wales Emergency Services	Patricia Kathleen Crowe
New South Wales Emergency Services	Graham Frederick Millgate
Victoria Emergency Services	Raymond Geoffrey Jasper
Victoria Emergency Services	Lynette Thomson
Queensland Emergency Services	John Francis McVeigh
Western Australia Emergency Services	Joseph John McLaughlin
Western Australia Emergency Services	Alexander James Williams
South Australia Emergency Services	Stefan Bilka
Tasmanian Emergency Services	Mark Walter Gillies BM
Tasmanian Emergency Services	Timothy Francis Kirkwood

== Distinguished Service ==
=== Medal for Gallantry (MG) ===
Medal for Gallantry ribbon

Branch	Recipient	Citation
Army	Lance Corporal M	For acts of gallantry in hazardous circumstances on Operation SLIPPER.

=== Commendation for Gallantry ===
Commendation for Gallantry ribbon

Branch	Recipient	Citation
Army	Private B	For acts of gallantry in action during Operation SLIPPER.

=== Bar to the Distinguished Service Cross (DSC and Bar) ===
Distinguished Service Cross & Bar ribbon

Branch	Recipient	Citation
Army	Lieutenant Colonel F	For distinguished command and leadership in warlike operations during Operation SLIPPER.

=== Distinguished Service Cross (DSC) ===
Distinguished Service Cross ribbon

Branch	Recipient	Citation
Army	Colonel Wade Bradley Stothart AM	For distinguished command and leadership in warlike operations as Commander of Combined Team-Uruzgan, during Operation SLIPPER from July 2013 to December 2013.

=== Bar to the Distinguished Service Medal (DSM and Bar) ===
Distinguished Service Medal and Bar ribbon

Branch	Recipient	Citation
Army	Major G	For distinguished leadership in warlike operations on Operation SLIPPER.
Army	Major S	For distinguished leadership in warlike operations on Operation SLIPPER.

=== Distinguished Service Medal (DSM) ===
Distinguished Service Medal ribbon

Branch	Recipient	Citation
Navy	Commodore Daryl Wayne Bates AM, RAN	For distinguished performance of duty in warlike operations as Commander Combined Task Force 150 on Operation SLIPPER from November 2013 to April 2014.
Army	Captain C	For distinguished leadership in warlike operations and in action as a platoon commander with the Special Operations Task Group on Operation SLIPPER in Afghanistan in 2009.
Army	Brigadier K	For distinguished leadership in warlike operations in Afghanistan.
Army	Corporal O	For distinguished leadership in warlike operations on Operation SLIPPER.
Army	Captain S	For distinguished leadership in warlike operations on Operation SLIPPER.

=== Commendation for Distinguished Service ===
Commendation for Distinguished Service ribbon

Branch	Recipient	Citation
Navy	Lieutenant Commander Andrew Richard Hough RAN	For distinguished performance of duty in warlike operations as Executive Officer of HMAS Melbourne during Operation SLIPPER from September 2013 to February 2014.
Navy	Captain Brian Jonothan Schlegel RAN	For distinguished performance of duty in warlike operations as Commanding Officer HMAS Melbourne and Commander Task Group 633.1 on Operation SLIPPER from September 2013 to February 2014.
Army	Lieutenant Colonel Michael Timothy Bye	For distinguished performance of duty in warlike operations as Commanding Officer of the 2nd Cavalry Regiment Task Force on Operation SLIPPER from May to December 2013.
Army	Corporal H	For distinguished performance of duty in warlike operations on Operation SLIPPER.
Army	Sergeant J	For distinguished performance of duty in warlike operations as a Team Commander on Operation SLIPPER.
Army	Lieutenant Colonel Natasha Lea Ludwig	For distinguished performance of duty in warlike operations while Commanding Officer, Force Support Unit-Eight on Operation SLIPPER from June 2013 to February 2014.
Army	Major Brent Steven Maddock	For distinguished performance of duty in warlike operations as Chief Engineer for Combined Team-Uruzgan on Operation SLIPPER from June 2013 to December 2013.
Air Force	Squadron Leader Christopher Damien Hatch	For distinguished performance of duty in warlike operations as Force Protection Authority for Multi National Base Command-Tarin Kot, on Operation SLIPPER from July 2013 to December 2013.

=== Conspicuous Service Cross (CSC) ===
Conspicuous Service Cross ribbon

Branch	Recipient	Citation
Navy	LCDR Phillip Michael Brown RAN	For outstanding achievement in the design and implementation of the S-70B-2 helicopter technical training system in Training Authority-Aviation from July 2012 until July 2014.
Navy	Commander Lorinda Anne Carlin CSM RAN	For outstanding achievement as the Fleet Maritime Logistics Officer.
Navy	Lieut Brenton-James Alexander Glover RAN	For outstanding achievement as Executive Officer of HMAS Brunei from May 2011 until the decommissioning of the ship in December 2014.
Navy	Commander Ashley Mark Papp RAN	For outstanding achievement as Commanding Officer of HMAS Choules during Operation LANDSCAPE.
Navy	Captain Mona Shindy RAN	For outstanding achievement as the Navy Strategic Adviser on Islamic Cultural Affairs.
Army	LtCol Paul Joseph Barta	For outstanding devotion to duty as the Assistant Defence Attaché Manila during the Australian whole of government response to the Rodwell kidnap for ransom, and immediately following the devastation of Typhoon Haiyan.
Army	Major H	For outstanding achievement in the performance of duty as Staff Officer in Special Operations Headquarters.
Army	Major Vicki Ann Lanagan	For outstanding achievement to the Australian Army in the field of career management.
Army	LtCol Roderick Lindsay Lang	For outstanding achievement as the Commander of Joint Task Force 630 on Operation PHILIPPINES ASSIST during the period 23 November to 17 December 2013.
Army	LtCol Ian Douglas Marsh	For outstanding achievement as the Commanding Officer of the 1st Health Support Battalion and the 1st Close Health Battalion.
Army	LtCol Scott Martin Morris	For outstanding achievement as Staff Officer Grade One Global Operations Team One, Operation SLIPPER, Headquarters Joint Operations Command from January 2013 to May 2014.
Army	LtCol Matthew John Quinn	For outstanding achievement in the performance of duty in the Infrastructure Section of Army Headquarters.
Army	Colonel S	For outstanding devotion to duty as a Director in Special Operations Command.
Army	Colonel Murray Ronald Thompson	For outstanding achievement as Director Future Military Commitments, Military Strategic Commitments Branch.
Army	Major John Kevin Walker	For outstanding achievement as Officer Commanding B Squadron, 5th Aviation Regiment.
Air Force	Wing Commander Debra Anne Greig	For outstanding achievement in personnel management and administration.
Air Force	Wing Commander James Robert Hogg	For outstanding achievement as Deputy Director of the Air Mobility Control Centre.
Air Force	Warrant Officer John Laing Lindsay	For outstanding devotion to duty as the Warrant Officer-In-Charge of Aircraft Life Support Section at Number 92 Wing.
Air Force	Group Captain Sue Elizabeth McGready	For outstanding achievement as the Commander, Defence National Storage and Distribution Centre.
Air Force	Group Captain Paul James Willmot	For outstanding devotion to duty in aircrew development and sustainment.

=== Conspicuous Service Medal (CSM) ===
Conspicuous Service Medal ribbon

Branch	Recipient	Citation
Navy	Warrant Officer Nicholas Llewellyn Davies	For meritorious devotion to duty as Chief Petty Officer Physical Training Instructor at the Navy Indoor Sports Centre, in managing and executing Military Self Defence training for Operations RESOLUTE and SOVEREIGN BORDERS.
Navy	Leading Seaman Emily Jade Ettridge	For meritorious achievement as the First Aid Recruit Instructor at the Royal Australian Navy Recruit School, HMAS Cerberus.
Navy	Captain Wendy Anne Malcolm RAN	For meritorious devotion to duty as the ANZAC Systems Program Office Director.
Navy	Commander Gareth Keri Marjoram RAN	For meritorious achievement as Senior Weapons Electrical Engineer at Submarine Force Headquarters, HMAS Stirling and Senior Engineering Officer, HMAS Waller.
Navy	Chief Petty Officer Raymond Kenneth Rosendale	For meritorious achievement as the Navy Strategic Adviser on Indigenous Cultural Affairs.
Navy	Leading Seaman Simon Robert Yates	For meritorious achievement in Boatswain training implementation as the Boatswain's Faculty Program Assistant, HMAS Cerberus.
Army	Lieutenant Colonel Elisabeth Mary Barnett	For meritorious devotion to duty as the Career Advisor for Royal Australian Army Medical Corps and Royal Australian Army Dental Corps officers at the Directorate of Officer Career Management-Army.
Army	Sergeant Mitchell Scott Chatt	For meritorious devotion to duty as a member, and then Officer in Charge, of the Combat Health Training Team, Army School of Health.
Army	Lieutenant Colonel G	For meritorious achievement as Staff Officer Grade One in Army Headquarters.
Army	Warrant Officer Class One David Ramon Grundell	For meritorious achievement as the Master Gunner, New Equipment Training Team.
Army	Major Konrad Kazmirowicz	For meritorious achievement as Officer Commanding C Squadron, 5th Aviation Regiment and Chief Instructor for the CH-47D Chinook capability.
Army	Lieutenant Colonel Denise Oliver	For meritorious achievement as Staff Officer Grade 1 Special Projects, Army Compliance and Assurance Agency.
Army	Lieutenant Colonel S	For meritorious devotion to duty to Special Operations Command.
Army	Warrant Officer Class Two W	For meritorious devotion to duty to the 1st Commando Regiment, and in committed support to unit welfare and the seriously wounded and injured soldiers and their families.
Army	Warrant Officer Class One W	For meritorious achievement and dedication to duty to the Special Air Service Regiment.
Army	Warrant Officer Class Two Stephen Paul Wurst	For meritorious devotion to duty as the Assistant Army Attaché, Australian Defence Staff-Jakarta.
Air Force	Corporal Cameron Adon Lambert	For meritorious devotion to duty in Airfield Engineering Flight at Number 383 Squadron.
Air Force	Warrant Officer Janet Louise O'Dea	For meritorious devotion to duty as Squadron Warrant Officer of Number 460 Squadron.

=== Meritorious Unit Citation ===
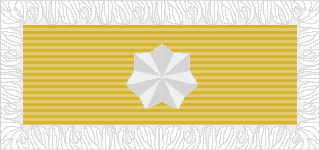
Meritorious Unit Citation

Branch	Recipient	Citation
Army	1st Joint Movement Group	For sustained and outstanding warlike operational service in the Middle East Area of Operations over the period November 2001 to June 2014. The 1st Joint Movement Group was continuously deployed for 13 years and provided sustained and outstanding service to the Australian Defence Force and supporting Australian government agencies by successfully enabling the force projection, sustainment and re-deployment of all force elements to and from the Middle East as part of Operations FALCONER, BASTILLE, CATALYST, SLIPPER, KRUGER, RIVERBANK and PALATE.
Army	Task Force 66 (Special Operations Task Groups IV – XX)	For sustained and outstanding warlike operational service in Afghanistan from 30 April 2007 to 31 December 2013, through the conduct of counter insurgency operations in support of the International Security Assistance Force. Over a six-year period, Task Force 66 rendered outstanding service on operations in Afghanistan where it conducted highly successful counter insurgency operations within Uruzgan and surrounding provinces in support of the International Security Assistance Force. The Task Force’s outstanding performance against an unrelenting, cunning and ruthless enemy, in an unforgiving environment, was achieved through the collective efforts of every member of the contingent over the duration of the commitment. The superior combat operations results of Task Group 66 further emphasised the Group’s exceptional courage and commitment.
