= James Olds (disambiguation) =

James Olds (1922–1976), American psychologist

James Olds may also refer to:

- James Olds (bass) (born 1986), Australian bass
- James Olds (rugby league) (born 1991), Welsh international rugby league player
