= Tait Memorial Trust =

UK-Australian foundation

The Tait Memorial Trust (TMT) is a charitable foundation first established in the United Kingdom. The TMT was founded by Isla Baring OAM in memory of her father, Sir Frank Tait and his brothers, who played an important part in the establishment of theatre and the performing arts in Australia. Sir Frank, the youngest of the Tait brothers, carried the firm J. C. Williamson's into its most successful years dominated by the Sutherland-Williamson opera company in 1965 which brought Joan Sutherland back to her homeland.

== History ==
In 2011, an Australian Trust to support the work of the TMT was created under the name of "The Tait Performing Arts Association". In May 2017, the Trust formally announced funding of young artists from New Zealand.

== Structure ==
=== Tait Memorial Trust ===
- Chairman: Isla Baring OAM
- Founding Patrons: Dame Joan Sutherland AC OM DBE, Viola, Lady Tait AM, John McCallum AO CBE, Googie Withers AO CBE
- Patrons: Leanne Benjamin AM OBE, Richard Bonynge AC CBE Danielle de Niese, John Frost (producer) AM, Julian Gavin, Liane Keegan, Piers Lane AO, Leslie Macleod-Miller, Father Peter Macleod-Miller, Ermes de Zan
- Trustees: Justin Baring, Isla Baring OAM, Dr Margaret Mayston AM, Matthew Phillips, Susie Thornton, Chad Vindin
- Committee: Fay Curtin, Meredith Daneman, Kirsty Grace, Wendy Kramer, Gayle McDermott, Sue McGreggor, Melanie Rendall, Ann Seddon, Jacqueline Thompson, Rosemary Tuck
- Honorary Member: Nicola Downer AM
- Music board: Ross Alley, Dr Helen Ayres, Isla Baring OAM, Deborah Humble, Belinda McFarlane, Rosemary Tuck, Chad Vindin (chair)
- Ballet board: Leanne Benjamin AM OBE, Isla Baring OAM, Meredith Daneman
- Administrator: James Hancock

== Leanne Benjamin Awards ==
The Tait Memorial Trust in collaboration with Leanne Benjamin AM OBE launched new ballet awards for young Australian dancers studying in the UK. The proceeds from the first event at the Royal Ballet School on 12 June 2014 were added to this scholarship fund. Australian students at the school including Sophie Moffatt, Josephine Frick, Kiely Groenewegen, Grace Robinson, Harry Churches, Connor Barlow (English National Ballet School) and Kenji Wilkie performed for an audience which included Lady Sainsbury CBE and Sir Peter Wright. The evening ended with a masterclass given by Leanne Benjamin AM OBE.

== Tait John Frost Musical Theatre Bursary ==
The Tait Memorial Trust in collaboration with Associated Studios, London launched a new Musical Theatre award for young artists from Australia or New Zealand who wish to study Musical Theatre. The award is funded by Australian musical theatre impressario, and Tait patron, John Frost AM. The inaugural recipient in 2023 was NSW singer/dancer Cathlyn-Rose McKellar. The 2024 winner is Rebecca Rolle from Queensland.

== Alumni ==
The TMT has helped many young composers, conductors, dancers, singers and instrumentalists who have subsequently performed with British orchestras, leading opera companies and major international ballet companies, including Thomas Rann, Daniel de Borah, Mary-Jean O'Doherty, Li-Wei, Amy Dickson, Elena Xanthoudakis, Valda Wilson, Yelian He, Lauren Fagan, Alexandra Hutton, Phoebe Humphreys, Siobhan Stagg, Kelly Lovelady, Simon Lobelson, Helena Dix, Miranda Keys, Liane Keegan, Benjamin Bayl, William Chen, Natalie Christie, James Hancock, Grant Doyle, Kelly Lovelady, Melbourne Chamber Strings, Melbourne Piano Trio, Derek Welton, Leslie John Flanagan, Jayson Gillham, Morgan Pearse, Julian Gavin, Joanna Cole and Kevin Penkin.
