= Yelian He =

Australian/Chinese musician and martial artist

Yelian He 何烨联
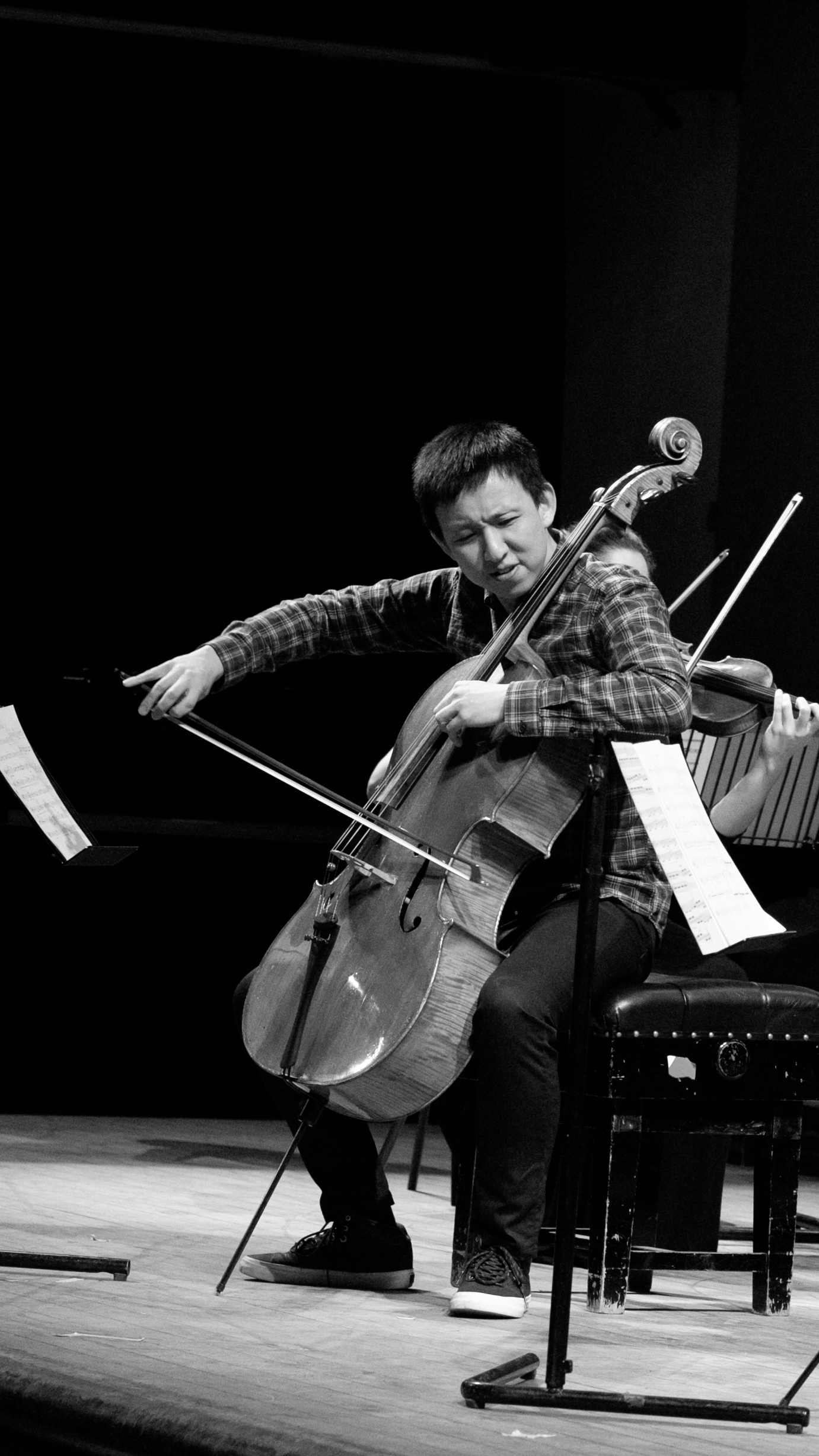
- Yelian in 2014 at St. John's, Smith Square, London

Background information
- Born: Shanghai, China
- Genre: Classical
- Occupations: Musician, martial artist
- Instrument: Cello
- Website: heplayscello.com

Yelian He
- Traditional Chinese: 何燁聯
- Simplified Chinese: 何烨联
Transcriptions
Standard Mandarin
- Hanyu Pinyin: hé yè lián

Yelian He (Chinese: 何烨联 | Mandarin: hé yè lián) is an Australian/Chinese classical concert cellist and martial arts teacher. Born in Shanghai, China, and raised in Melbourne, Australia, he began studying the cello at the age of five, almost two years after he commenced studies on the piano with his father. He was hailed as a "consummate master of the bow" by The Strad magazine on his Wigmore Hall debut, He was the winner of the 2009 Royal Over-Seas League String Competition in London, as well as the Grand Prize and Audience Prize at the 2014 Australian Cello Awards competition in Sydney.

== Early life ==
Yelian He was born in Shanghai, China, and emigrated in 1992 with his family to Australia, where he furthered his studies at Scotch College, Melbourne. He graduated with a B.Mus from University of Melbourne Faculty of VCA and MCM on an Otti Veit Scholarship, and subsequently relocated to Manchester to study with Karine Georgian at the Royal Northern College of Music, where he graduated with a master's degree in Music.

== Career ==
In 2009, He won the string section in the Royal Over-Seas League 57th Annual Music Competition and was the Grand Prize winner in the 2014 Australian Cello Awards, receiving a host of awards in Sydney's Verbrugghen Hall. He has given recitals and performances at Wigmore Hall, Queen Elizabeth Hall, St John's, Smith Square, Bridgewater Hall, Melbourne Recital Centre, Sydney Opera House, City Recital Hall, Hamer Hall, Perth Concert Hall, Shanghai Concert Hall, Shanghai Grand Theatre, Oriental Arts Centre, Forbidden City Concert Hall, Wuxi Grand Theatre, Wuhan QinTai Concert Hall. He has appeared as a soloist with orchestras such as the Sydney Symphony Orchestra, West Australian Symphony Orchestra, and Shanghai Philharmonic Orchestra.

His first CD, Y2: Music for Cello & Piano, was released by Willowhayne Records (UK) and featured works by Svante Henryson and Nikolai Kapustin among other works. The release was praised by the composer Henryson, who has stated: "Yelian He plays On A Day Like This and Black Run with all the passion, energy and technical mastery that I as a composer could wish for. It is a joy to hear his versions."

== Awards ==
- Tait Memorial Trust Award (2007, 2009)
- Australian Music Foundation Award (2009)
- Tunnell Trust Award (2012)
- Kirckman Concert Society Award (2013)
- City Music Foundation Artist (2014)

In 2011, Yelian He was presented to HM Queen Elizabeth II at a reception for outstanding Australians in the United Kingdom, and again in 2013 in a private performance for the Queen and her Commonwealth guests at Buckingham Palace.

== Personal life ==
Yelian He's nickname is the "Kung Fu Cellist" and he studies Wing Chun Kung Fu with his Sifu in Manchester. He is a part of the Tse Qigong Centre under Grandmaster Ip Chun's lineage (eldest son of the legendary Ip Man, most popularly known from Ip Man (film series) and teacher of Bruce Lee). Since 2019, Yelian started his own Wing Chun classes in Melbourne, where he resides.

== Sources ==
- Yelian He official website
- Hancock Artists official website
