= Associated Studios =

Drama school in London

Coordinates: 51.5165°N 0.2227°W

Associated Studios is a drama school in London, offering degree and diploma courses in musical theatre.

Associated Studios were founded by Leontine Hass in 2007, then based at the Royal Academy of Music, in order to address a lack of top-level ongoing professional development and training for performers. In addition to regular classes and masterclasses in acting, singing and dance, Associated Studios also runs Professional Development Workshops for performers who are already working. Associated Studios is the only Performing Arts Academy in the UK to offer training for performers starting a career as well as industry professionals looking for ongoing professional development. On graduation students are eligible for entry into Spotlight, the leading industry casting directory.

== Premises ==
In 2019 the school relocated to a 3 floored building in Kensington and Chelsea.

== Musical theatre courses ==
The first one-year full-time Musical Theatre course started in September 2016. Other shorter, part-time courses are also offered throughout the school's academic year which are essentially only specific portions of the same full-time course. This involves such part-time students joining the full-time course at different times of the year for a shorter period and generally sharing the same classes as full-time students.

In 2020 an MA in Musical Theatre Performance course was introduced validated by the University of Wolverhampton. The course is aimed at performers with the potential to train for a career in Musical Theatre and offers a year of intensive, practical training in dance, singing and acting.

In 2023 Associated Studios moved their validation partner to become affiliated with University of Chichester, offering both their MA in Musical Theatre Performance, and now a 2-year accelerated BA(Hons) in Musical Theatre (Professional Performance) both of which are accredited by the University of Chichester.

In August 2020 it was announced that patron Jeremy Irons was gifting a bursary for a talented performer to study on the one year Diploma in Musical Theatre course.

== Tait John Frost Musical Theatre Bursary ==
The Tait Memorial Trust in collaboration with Associated Studios, London launched a new Musical Theatre award for young artists from Australia or New Zealand who wish to study Musical Theatre in June 2022. The award is funded by Australian Musical Theatre Impressario, and Tait Patron, John Frost (producer) AM. The inaugural recipient in 2023 was NSW singer/dancer Cathlyn-Rose McKellar. The 2024 winner is Rebecca Rolle from Queensland.

== Key personnel ==
- Leontine Hass - Founding principal/director
- Scott Harrison - Deputy Principal
- Kathy Taylor-Jones - Singing tutor

== Patrons ==
- Sir Tim Rice
- Jeremy Irons
- Rory Bremner
- Timothy West
- Jeremy Herrin
- Danielle Tarento
- Gloria Onitiri
- Scott Alan
- Rosalind Plowright
- Mike Dixon
- Alastair Lindsey-Renton

== Alumni ==
- Jamie Lambert - Collabro (Winner of Britain's Got Talent 2014)
- Alice Stokke - Sophie in Mama Mia! (West End: Novello Theatre)
