= Leanne Benjamin =

Australian ballet dancer (born 1964)

Leanne Benjamin AM OBE
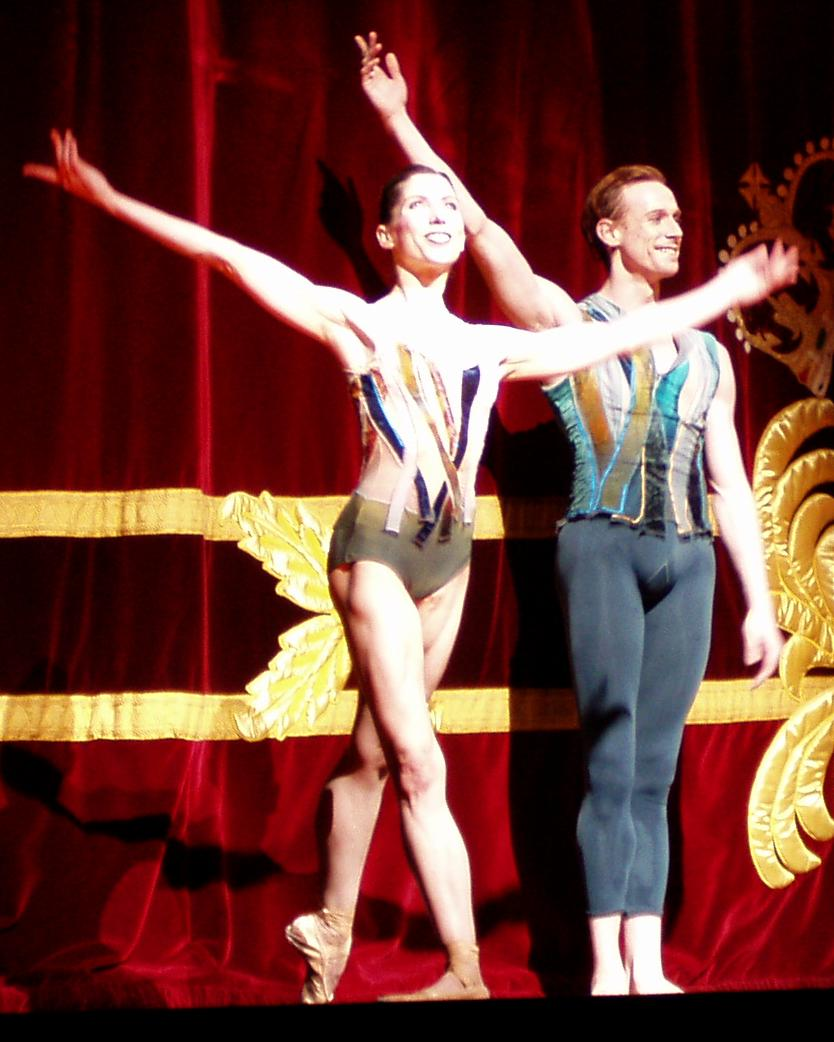
- Leanne Benjamin curtain call for DGV: Danse à Grande Vitesse, Royal Ballet
- Born: Leanne Faye Benjamin; 13 July 1964 (age 61); Rockhampton, Queensland, Australia
- Education: Royal Ballet School
- Occupation(s): Artistic director, Queensland Ballet
- Years active: 1983–2013
- Spouse: Tobias Round (m. 2001)
- Children: 1
- Career
- Former groups: The Royal Ballet; Sadler's Wells Royal Ballet; London Festival Ballet; Deutsche Oper Ballet

Leanne Faye Benjamin AM OBE (born 13 July 1964) is a retired Australian ballet dancer who was a principal dancer with the Royal Ballet in London. She was appointed artistic director at the Queensland Ballet in 2024. She stepped down from the position on 2 August 2024.

== Early life and training ==
Benjamin was born in Rockhampton, Queensland, to Jill and Bernie Benjamin. Benjamin began ballet lessons at age three at a local dance school, and had attended The Range Convent and High School. In 1980, she was accepted into the Royal Ballet School at age 16. Within a year, she won two prestigious awards, the Adeline Genée Gold Medal and Prix de Lausanne, and trained at the Royal Ballet for two years. One of her teachers was Mona Vangsaae. At her graduation performance, she and Jonathan Cope performed the two lead roles in Giselle.

== Ballet career ==
In 1983, at age 18, Benjamin joined the Sadler's Wells Royal Ballet (now Birmingham Royal Ballet), and became a principal dancer in 1987. The following year, she joined the London Festival Ballet (now English National Ballet), directed by Peter Schaufuss, Vangsaae's son. In 1990, she moved to Deutsche Oper Ballet in Berlin, where Schaufuss went on to direct. In Berlin, she worked with choreographer Kenneth MacMillan on Different Drummer. Encouraged by MacMillan, she joined The Royal Ballet as a First Soloist in 1992, making her company debut as Mary Vetsera in Mayerling, though MacMillan died shortly before that performance. The following year, she was promoted to principal dancer.

Benjamin is best known for dancing works by MacMillan. She was one of the last dancers to work with MacMillan, Royal Ballet founder Ninette de Valois and founding choreographer Frederick Ashton. She had also worked with other choreographers such as Christopher Wheeldon and Wayne McGregor. She had performed with Wheeldon's company, Morphoses/The Wheeldon Company.

In 2004 and 2009 she won the National Dance Award for Best Female Dancer.

In 2013, she retired after two decades with the Royal Ballet. She reprised her first role with The Royal Ballet, Mary Vetsera in Mayerling.

== Repertory ==
Odette/Odile in Swan Lake, Giselle, the Sugar Plum Fairy in The Nutcracker, Aurora in Sleeping Beauty, Nikiya, Kitri, Swanilda, The Firebird, Cinderella, Lise, Titania, Manon, Anastasia, Juliet (Ashton and MacMillan), Mitzi Caspar and Mary Vetsera in Mayerling, Irina, The Girl in The Invitation, The Judas Tree, Song of the Earth, Gloria, Requiem, Rhapsody, Elite Syncopations, Les Biches, Symphony in C, Apollo, Danses Concertantes, Etudes, Brünnhilde in Béjart's Ring, Carmen, Forsythe's Herman Schmerman and Ashton's The Leaves Are Fading, Swanilda in Coppélia.

She has created roles in Bintley's Metamorphosis, The Snow Queen and Earth as part of Homage to The Queen, Bruce's Symphony in Three Movements and in Mr. Worldly Wise, Two-Part Invention, When We Stop Talking, Masquerade and most recently Wayne McGregor's Qualia, "Infra", and "Limen", Robert Garland's Spring Rites, Alastair Marriott's Tanglewood, Liam Scarlett's Despite and Wheeldon's DGV.

== Post-ballet career ==
In honour of her career with The Royal Ballet, the Leanne Benjamin Awards were launched at a public masterclass at The Royal Ballet School on 12 June 2014. The awards were created and will be administered by The Tait Memorial Trust, of which Leanne Benjamin is a Patron. The awards are scholarships for young Australian and New Zealand ballet dancers studying in the UK.

In January 2014, Leanne Benjamin was awarded the Critics' Circle de Valois award for outstanding achievement.

Benjamin now works as a coach for both the Royal Ballet and other companies. She had also studied design and work as an interior designer.

In 2021, Benjamin published her autobiography, Built for Ballet.

In 2024, she succeeded Li Cunxin as artistic director of the Queensland Ballet. She stepped down on 2 August 2024.

== Personal life ==
In 2001, Benjamin married Tobias Round, a theatre producer and son of Georgina Parkinson. The couple has a son, born in 2003.

== Honours ==
In the 2005 New Year Honours, Benjamin was appointed an Officer of the Order of the British Empire (OBE) for her services to dance. Ten years later at the 2015 Australia Day Honours, Benjamin was appointed a Member of the Order of Australia (AM) for significant service to the performing arts, particularly ballet, as a dancer and role model.
