= John Croucher =

Australian statistician

John Sydney Croucher AM is an Australian statistician and Professor of Actuarial Studies and Business Analytics in the Macquarie Business School at Macquarie University in Sydney Australia. He has written around 33 books, 120 research papers, and 500 newspaper articles.

His recent works include The Kid from Norfolk Island (Woodslane, 2014), Mistress of Science (Amberley, 2018), Women of Science (Amberley, 2019) and A Concise History of New South Wales (Woodslane, 2020). Croucher has written many textbooks on mathematics and statistics for McGraw-Hill Australia, including Quantitative Analysis for Management 6e (2020), Mathematics and Statistics for Business 6e (revised) (2016) and Statistics: Making Business Decisions (2001),

Croucher has also written many trade books, including Love by Numbers (Woodslane, 2011), The Secret Language (ABC Books, 2010). Number Crunch ( Pan Macmillan, 2006), Eighteen Months on the Toilet (Woodslane, 2010 ), 637 Gorillas on the Run (Woodslane, 2010), Exam Scams (Allen and Unwin, 1996) and Great Frauds and Everyday Scams (Allen and Unwin, 1997)

Croucher holds four PhD degrees. He has PhD degrees in history from both Macquarie University and the University of Technology Sydney. He also holds a PhD in Mathematics and Statistics from the University of Minnesota in the United States. Croucher also has an honorary doctorate from Divine Word University in Papua New Guinea. and was the recipient of the Prime Minister's Australian University Teacher of the Year award in 2013. He is also a renowned speaker and the subject of many articles. Between 200 and 2012 he was the author of the popular Number Crunch column for the Good Weekend in the Sydney Morning Herald and The Age in Melbourne.

He is married to fellow academic Rosalind Croucher and they both became Members of the Order of Australia as part of the 2015 Australia Day Honours. John Croucher is also a Fellow of the Royal Society of the Arts and a Fellow of the Australian Mathematical Society.
