= Guy Parsons =

British accountant, auditor, and liquidator (1926–2019)

Guy Thomas Ernest Parsons FCA OBE (6 February 1926 – 27 August 2019) was a British accountant, auditor, liquidator and involved in a number of charities.

== Charity ==
He was involved with the Australian Music Foundation and The Lynn Foundation.

== Finance ==
He was appointed insolvency chief of Rolls-Royce during their 1971 bankruptcy.

== Overseas ==
He helped set up Solomon Islands airline SOLAIR as well as the Oman and Yemen electrical board authorities.

== Books ==
He co-authored Employees' Rights in Receiverships and Liquidations with William Ratford.

== Honours ==
He was appointed an Officer of the Order of the British Empire (OBE) in the 2016 Birthday Honours, "for services to business and charity.".
