= Australian Music Foundation =

Australian foundation

The Australian Music Foundation [AMF] is a charitable foundation, first established in the United Kingdom, with the chief purpose of providing financial support to outstanding young Australian musicians who wish to pursue post-graduate music courses in leading music education institutions around the globe. It also offers performance opportunities in Australia and abroad, advice and mentoring to awardees.

At inception, the AMF's activities were centred on the UK, reflecting a historical tradition of strong institutional links between Australian music academies and British institutions such as the Royal College of Music, Royal Academy of Music, the Royal Northern College of Music and the Guildhall School of Music and Drama. In recent years the AMF has more actively expanded its field of activity to include North America, Europe, and South East Asia.

== History ==
The AMF was initially established by Deed of Trust declared on 30 December 1975 in the United Kingdom (under the name of 'Australian Musical Foundation in London'), the original Trustees being Baron Goodman, Sir Davis Hughes, Mr Robert Norman, Group Cpt Douglas Bader, Mr Sam Lynn, and Mr Guy Parsons OBE. The first awards were made in 1980.

In 2006 an Australian Trust to support the work of the AMF was created under the name of "The AMF Australia Foundation". Professor Peter Tregear OAM was founding chair; Dene Olding took over in 2021.

== Structure ==
=== The Australian Music Foundation (UK) ===
- Patron-in-Chief: The Prince of Wales KG
- Patron: His Excellency the Honourable George Brandis QC, Australian High Commissioner to the UK
- President: Lord Broers Kt FRS FREng
- Joint Life Presidents: Richard Bonynge AC CBE, Yvonne Kenny AM
- Life Presidents In Memoriam: Dame Joan Sutherland AC DBE, Sir Charles Mackerras CH AC CBE, Dr Peter Andry, OBE OAM, Professor Peter Sculthorpe AO OBE, Sir John Tooley, Lord Carrington KG GCMG CH MC, Guy Parsons OBE
- Chair (Board of Trustees): Yvonne Kenny AM

=== The AMF Australia Foundation (AUS) ===
- Patron: His Excellency General the Honourable David Hurley AC DSC (Retd)
- Chair (Board of Trustees): Dene Olding
- Secretary: Mr Andrew Boxall

== Awardees ==
- 2015/16: Emily Edmonds (mezzo soprano), Lauren Fagan (soprano), Alexandra Flood (soprano), Andrey Lebedev (guitar), Stephanie Jones (guitar), Sonya Pigot (piano – AMF Nora Goodridge Young Artist Award) and Emily Sun (violin – AMF Nora Goodridge Emerging Artist Award).
- 2019/20: Magdalenna Krstevska (clarinet – AMF Nora Goodridge Developing Artist Award), Yvette Keong (soprano – AMF Nora Goodridge Young Artist Award), James Blackford (euphonium – AMF Guy Parsons Award), Victoria Wong (violin), David Soo (piano), Waynne Kwon (cello), Jeremy Kleeman (bass baritone), Courtenay Cleary (violin), Guillaume Wang (cello), Robbin Reza (piano), Mitzi Gardner (violin).

== Alumni ==
Past awardees have become some of Australia's leading musicians in their field; they include: Elizabeth Campbell (mezzo-soprano), Rosamund Illing (soprano), Ian Munro (piano), Craig Ogden (guitar), Deborah Riedel (mezzo-soprano), Jeffrey Black (baritone), Mark Bonetti (cello), Peter Coleman-Wright (baritone), Andrew Wheeler (conductor), Alexander Briger (conductor), Yelian He (cello), Slava Grigoryan (guitar), Clemens Leske (piano), Benjamin Bayl (organ), Duncan Gifford (piano), David Hansen (counter-tenor), Laurence Meikle (baritone), Amir Farid (piano), Amy Dickson (saxophone), Lauren Fagan (soprano), Emily Sun (violin).
