= James Morton (physician) =

Australian physician and advocate for children with autism

James Morton AM is an Australian medical doctor and advocate for children with autism spectrum disorders. Morton is a specialist haematologist and oncologist at Brisbane's Mater Hospital and a senior specialist with the Leukaemia & Bone Marrow Transplant Service at the Royal Brisbane and Women's Hospital.

== Early life ==
Dr James Morton was born in Brisbane, Queensland.

Morton graduated with a MB BS from the University of Queensland in 1987 with a university medal and completed his general medical training in 1991.

== Career ==
In 1996, Morton travelled to the United States where he was an international fellow at the Fred Hutchinson Cancer Research Center in Seattle, before returning to Australian in 1998.

Morton was previously board member of Icon Cancer Care and the Leukaemia Foundation, where he was credited with developing the World's Greatest Shave initiative into an annual national campaign from a one-off event in Lismore, New South Wales.

Morton is arguably best known for his advocacy of children with autism.

Following a report commissioned by Morton, Australian Prime Minister John Howard announced that $190 million of additional funding would be delivered to support services for autistic children. The funding announcement was welcomed by Morton who described it as a "monumental package".

Morton was named in the 2015 Australia Day Honours and was made a Member of the Order of Australia in recognition for his significant service to children with autism spectrum disorders and to the field of oncology.

On Queensland Day in 2020, Morton was named as a Queensland Great.
