= Milton Hearn =

Australian chemist

Milton Hearn AM FTSE
- Born: Milton Thomas William Hearn; 17 February 1943 (age 83); Adelaide, South Australia
- Education: University of Adelaide
- Known for: Green chemistry
- Scientific career
- Fields: Chemistry
- Workplaces: Monash University
- Academic advisors: Csaba Horvath, Ewart Jones

Milton Thomas William Hearn (born 17 February 1943) is a Professor of Chemistry and the Director of the Australian Research Council Special Research Centre for Green Chemistry at the Monash University. He was previously the head of the department of Biochemistry and Molecular Biology. His work focuses on studying biomolecular structure, the study of separation science, and using that knowledge to develop green processes. He earned his B.S, Ph.D, and D.Sc in Organic Chemistry at University of Adelaide. He then did his postdoctoral work in Canada before working in New Zealand. From 1981 to 1985, he was a Research Fellow at the St. Vincent's Institute of Medical Research before joining Monash in 1986. Since 2002, he has been the Director of the Green Chemistry Center.

Hearn has received the Leighton Memorial Award from the Royal Australian Chemical Society, the Centennial Medal of the Commonwealth of Australia and the American Chemical Society Award in Chromatography. He is a Fellow of the Royal Society of Victoria, the Australian Academy of Technological Sciences and Engineering, the Australian Institute of Company Directors, the Royal Chemical Institute, and IUPAC. He was appointed a Member of the Order of Australia in the 2015 Australia Day Honours for service to science.
