= Deborah Humble =

Australian mezzo-soprano (born 1969)

- Born: Bangor, Gwynedd, U.K.
- Education: Elder Conservatorium of Music; Australian Catholic University (MM); University of Melbourne
- Occupation: Singer (mezzo-soprano)
- Website: deborahhumble.com

Deborah Humble is a Welsh-born Australian dramatic mezzo-soprano noted for her operatic roles and performances on the world's concert stages. A principal artist with Opera Australia and the Hamburg State Opera, Humble was a recipient of the AOAC Dame Joan Sutherland Award in 2004 and a finalist in the International Wagner Competition held in Seattle in 2008. The recipient of three Green Room Award nominations (2022, 2023, and 2026), she has been included in the Who's Who of Australian Women since 2009.

== Life and career ==
Born in Bangor, Gwynedd, Wales, Humble grew up in Adelaide, Australia and attended Seymour College.

Humble has a Bachelor of Music (Performance) from the Elder Conservatorium of Music, University of Adelaide, a Master of Music from the Australian Catholic University, and diplomas in Education and Music from the University of Melbourne. In 1995 she was a Young Artist with the Victoria State Opera.

After moving to Paris, Humble worked with Les Musiciens du Louvre, under the direction of conductor Marc Minkowski. She performed regularly at the Théâtre du Châtelet and participated in multiple recordings including Offenbach's operetta La belle Hélène, staged by French director Laurent Pelly. Her discography also includes Anne Sofie von Otter sings Offenbach (Deutsche Grammophon) and Handel's Hercules (Archiv Produktion).

Humble made her British debut in 2001 for Scottish Opera in Scottish Opera Go Round, the touring branch of the company. In 2002 she took up the position of principal mezzo-soprano with Opera Australia singing early career roles such as Third Lady in The Magic Flute, Rosette in Manon, Clarissa in The Love for Three Oranges, Sonyetka in Lady Macbeth of Mtensk and the title roles in Gilbert and Sullivan's Iolanthe and Purcell's Dido and Aeneas. In 2005 she was appointed principal artist at the Hamburg State Opera where her many roles included Suzuki in Madama Butterfly, Zenobia in Radamisto, Bradamante in Alcina, Marcellina in The Marriage of Figaro, Malik in L'Upupa und der Triumph der Sohnesliebe, Madelon in Andrea Chénier and Hänsel in Hänsel und Gretel. She came to international attention singing Erda and Waltraute in Wagner's Der Ring des Nibelungen conducted by Simone Young and directed by Claus Guth between 2008 and 2010.

Since 2011 Humble has been a freelance artist, becoming known in particular for singing the German operatic repertoire. Her interpretation of the works of Richard Wagner has been internationally recognised. Dramatic roles include Fricka in Das Rheingold and Die Walküre, Klytamnestra in Elektra, Amneris in Aida, Ulrica in Un ballo in maschera, Branngäne in Tristan und Isolde, Lucretia in The Rape of Lucretia, Mescalina in Le Grand Macabre, Judith in Bluebeard's Castle, Baba the Turk in The Rake's Progress, the title role in Carmen and Dalilah in Samson et Dalilah.

Humble has sung most of the major mezzo concert repertoire including the Waldtaube in Schoenberg's Gurre-Lieder, Verdi's Requiem, Handel's Messiah, Mahler Symphonies No. 2, No. 3, and No. 8, Elgar's Sea Pictures, Wagner's Wesendonck Lieder, Dvorák's Requiem, Elgar's The Music Makers, The Dream of Gerontius with conductors such as Simone Young, Asher Fisch, Richard Hickox, Andris Nelsons, Pietari Inkinen, Vladimir Ashkenazy, Claudio Abbado, Jaap van Zweden, Edo de Waart, Gianluigi Gelmetti and Peter Schneider.

In 2022, Humble performed the mezzo solo in Mahler's Symphony No. 2 (Resurrection), with the Sydney Symphony Orchestra conducted by Simone Young. These concerts, marking the reopening of the Sydney Opera House after extensive renovations, were one of the most celebrated occasions in the building's history.

Humble has been an ambassador for Worldwide Cancer Research in the UK and for the City of Sydney Eisteddfod. She is a member of the Music Board of the Tait Memorial Trust in London and Mentor for the Melba Opera Trust in Melbourne. She is currently patron of the Wagner Society of South Australia, Operantics, the Newcastle Music Festival, and the Sydney Opera and Song Collective.

== Repertoire ==
Roles performed by Deborah Humble.

- Alisa – Lucia di Lammermoor (Gaetano Donizetti)
- Amneris – Aida (Giuseppe Verdi)
- Annina – La Traviata (Giuseppe Verdi)
- Antonia’s Mother – The Tales of Hoffmann (Jacques Offenbach)
- Aunty – Peter Grimes (Benjamin Britten)
- Baba the Turk – The Rake's Progress (Igor Stravinsky)
- Blumenmädchen – Parsifal (Richard Wagner)
- Boulotte – Barbe-bleue (Jacques Offenbach)
- Bradamante – Alcina (George Frideric Handel)
- Brangäne – Tristan und Isolde (Richard Wagner)
- Brigitte – Die tote Stadt (Erich Wolfgang Korngold)
- Carmen - Carmen (Georges Bizet)
- Clairon – Capriccio (Richard Strauss)
- Clarissa – The Love for Three Oranges (Sergei Prokofiev)
- La Cieca – La Gioconda (Amilcare Ponchielli)
- Dalilah – Samson and Delilah (Camille Saint-Saëns)
- Dido – Dido and Aeneas (Henry Purcell)
- Dulcinée – Don Quichotte (Jules Massenet)
- Erda – Das Rheingold / Siegfried (Richard Wagner)
- Fenena - Nabucco (Giuseppe Verdi)
- Flora – La Traviata (Giuseppe Verdi)
- Fortune Teller – Arabella (Richard Strauss)
- Fricka – Das Rheingold / Die Walküre (Richard Wagner)
- German mother – Death in Venice (Benjamin Britten)
- Grimgerde – Die Walküre (Richard Wagner)
- Groom/Gymnast - Lulu (Alban Berg)
- Hänsel – Hänsel und Gretel (Engelbert Humperdinck)
- Herodias – Salome (Richard Strauss)
- Iolanthe – Iolanthe (Gilbert and Sullivan)
- Judith – Bluebeard’s Castle (Béla Bartók)
- Julia Child – Bon Appetit! (Lee Hoiby)
- Kate – The Pirates of Penzance (Gilbert and Sullivan)
- Kate Pinkerton – Madame Butterfly (Giacomo Puccini)
- Klytamnestra – Elektra (Richard Strauss)
- 3rd Lady – Die Zauberflöte (Wolfgang Amadeus Mozart)
- Lisa – The Queen of Spades (Pyotr Ilyich Tchaikovsky)
- Lola – Cavalleria rusticana (Pietro Mascagni)
- Lucretia – The Rape of Lucretia (Benjamin Britten)
- Madame de Croissey – Dialogues of the Carmelites (Francis Poulenc)
- Maddalena – Rigoletto (Giuseppe Verdi)
- Madelon – Andrea Chénier (Umberto Giordano)
- Magdalena – Die Meistersinger von Nürnberg (Richard Wagner)
- 1st Maid – Elektra (Richard Strauss)
- 3rd Maid - Elektra (Richard Strauss)
- Malik – L'Upupa und der Triumph der Sohnesliebe (Hans Werner Henze)
- Marcellina – The Marriage of Figaro (Wolfgang Amadeus Mozart)
- Mary – Der fliegende Holländer (Richard Wagner)
- Mayor’s Wife – Jenůfa (Leoš Janáček)
- Mercedes – Carmen (Georges Bizet)
- Mescalina – Le Grand Macabre (György Ligeti)
- 1st Norn – Götterdämmerung (Richard Strauss)
- 2nd Norn – Götterdämmerung (Richard Strauss)
- Page – Salome (Richard Strauss)
- La Principessa – Suor Angelica (Giacomo Puccini)
- Olga – Eugene Onegin (Pyotr Ilyich Tchaikovsky)
- Rosette – Manon (Jules Massenet)
- Russian nanny – Death in Venice (Benjamin Britten)
- Ruth – The Pirates of Penzance (Gilbert and Sullivan)
- Schwertleite – Die Walküre (Richard Wagner)
- Siebel – Faust (Charles Gounod)
- Sister Helen Prejean – Dead Man Walking (Jake Heggie)
- Sonyetka – Lady Macbeth of Mtsensk (Dmitri Shostakovich)
- Sorceress – Dido and Aeneas (Henry Purcell)
- Suzuki – Madama Butterfly (Giacomo Puccini)
- Ulrica – Un ballo in maschera (Giuseppe Verdi)
- Voice from above - Parsifal (Richard Wagner)
- Waltraute – Die Walküre / Die Götterdämmerung (Richard Wagner)
- Wowkle – La fanciulla del West (Giacomo Puccini)
- Zenobia – Radamisto (George Frideric Handel)
- Zita – Gianni Schicchi (Giacomo Puccini)

== Discography ==
- The Love for Three Oranges (Prokofiev) Conducted by Richard Hickox, Chandos, 2005
- Das Rheingold (Wagner) Conducted by Simone Young, Oehms, 2008
- Die Walküre (Wagner) Conducted by Simone Young, Oehms, 2009
- Siegfried, (Wagner) Conducted by Simone Young, Oehms, 2011
- Die Götterdämmerung, (Wagner) Conducted by Simone Young, Oehms, 2012
- Das Rheingold, (Wagner) Conducted by Jaap van Zweden, Naxos, 2015
- Siegfried, (Wagner) Conducted by Jaap van Zweden, Naxos, 2017
- Marvellous Mezzo-soprano and Contralto, Best Loved Opera Arias, Naxos, 2020
- Symphony No. 1, Ringparabel, (Gloria Bruni) Conducted by Wilhelm Keitel, Rondeau, 2020.
- Mahler: Symphony No. 2, Barton: Of the Earth, Conducted by Simone Young, Deutsche Grammophon, 2025
