= James Olds (bass) =

Australian bass (born 1986)

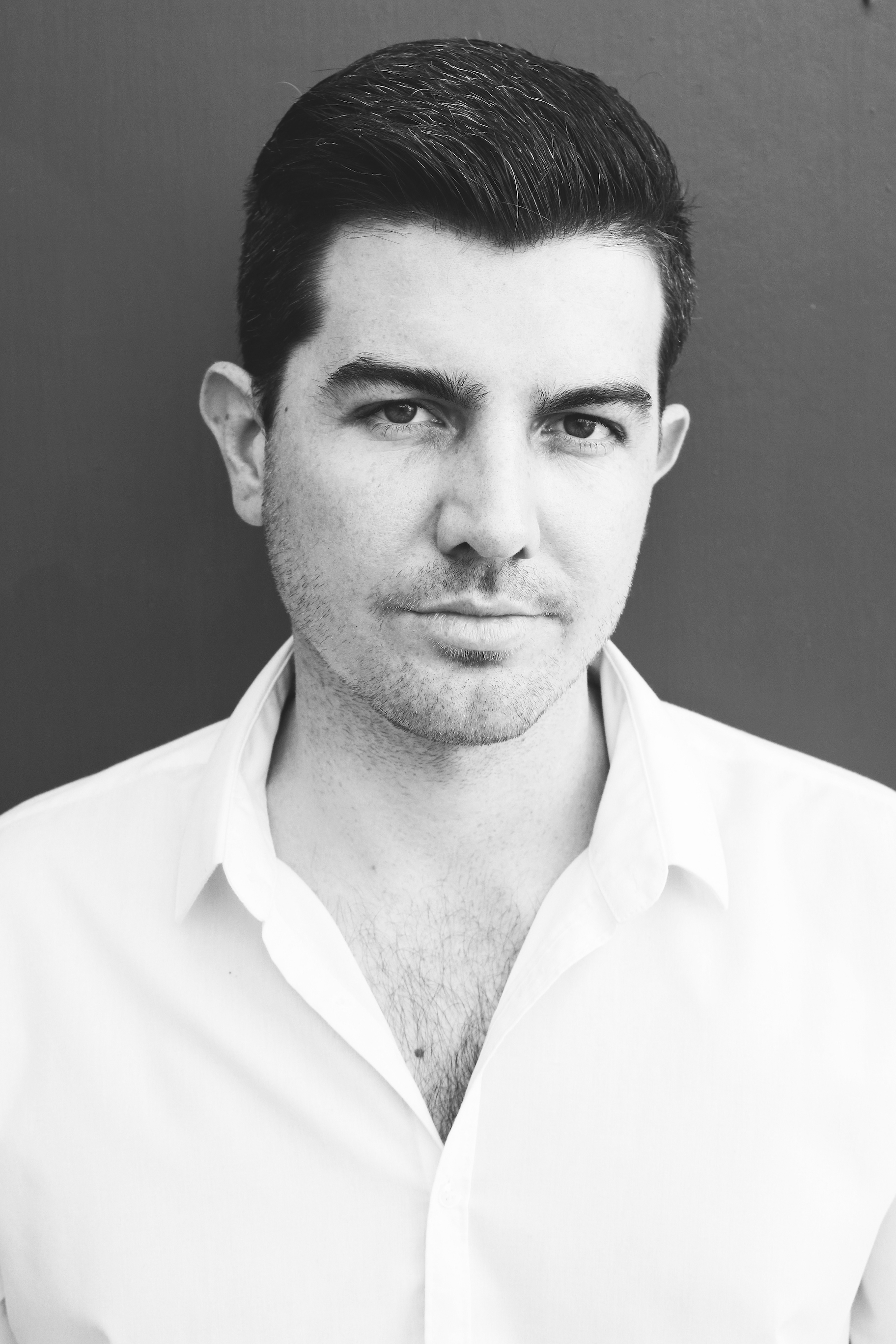
- Born: February 20, 1986 (age 39); Sydney, Australia
- Years active: 2004–present
- Website: jamesolds.com

James Andrew Olds (born 20 February 1986) is an Australian bass. He holds a Masters of Music in Performance (Voice & Opera) from the Guildhall School of Music and Drama, London, and currently performs with Opera Australia at the Sydney Opera House.

== Biography ==
In 2016, Olds made his debut as a principal artist with Opera Australia performing the role of The Officer in Rossini's The Barber of Seville and in 2018 performed the role of Sergeant in Handa Opera on Sydney Harbour in La bohème.

Olds has been an active member of the Opera Australia chorus since 2009. He has appeared in productions of Anna Bolena, Aida, Verdi Requiem, Parsifal, King Roger, Cavalleria rusticana, Pagliacci, Carmen, La bohème, The Love for Three Oranges, Simon Boccanegra, The Barber of Seville, La traviata, Lakmé, The Merry Widow, Macbeth, The Mikado, The Pirates of Penzance, Der Rosenkavalier and Fidelio.

In 2019, Olds will be performing alongside Jonas Kaufmann for the second time in concert performances of Andrea Chénier for Opera Australia and was selected as a Finalist for the Joan Sutherland and Richard Bonynge Foundation's third Sydney International Song Prize. Olds was also crowned the Winner of three sections at the 2019 Sydney Eisteddfod; Male Operatic Voices, Lieder (Open Age) and French and German art song.

In 2016, he was the recipient of both the Sanderson Award and the Hawaiian Performing Arts Festival Prize at Joan Sutherland and Richard Bonynge Foundation's Bel Canto Award Final and was a semi-finalist in the 2015 Sydney Eisteddfod Opera Scholarship.

In 2015, Olds performed the role of Count Almaviva in Mozart's The Marriage of Figaro for Rockdale Opera and was the Winner of the 34th National Liederfest, which secured him a scholarship at the Franz Schubert-Institut in Austria where he worked closely with Elly Ameling, Helmut Deutsch, Andreas Schmidt, Robert Holl, Rudolf Jansen and Werner Güra.

In 2013, Olds accepted a scholarship into the Artist Masters Programme at the Guildhall School of Music and Drama in London where he studied under Welsh Soprano Marilyn Rees. That same year, Olds toured the UK and France with Diva Opera again performing the role of The Officer in Rossini's The Barber of Seville and was a finalist in the Australian Music Foundation Awards at Wigmore Hall.

While in London, Olds performed the role of Betto in Puccini's Gianni Schicchi for St. Paul's Opera and the roles of Rocco (Fidelio), Leporello (Don Giovanni), and Dr. Dulcamara (L'elisir d'amore) for Guildhall Postgraduate Opera at the Milton Court Theatre.

== Opera Australia ==
- Fidelio – Chorus – 2009
- The Pirates of Penzance – Samuel (Cover) / Chorus – 2010
- Der Rosenkavalier – Chorus – 2010
- La bohème – Chorus – 2011
- Macbeth – Chorus – 2011
- The Mikado – Chorus – 2011
- Lakmé – Chorus – 2011
- The Merry Widow – Chorus – 2011
- La traviata – Chorus – 2012
- The Barber of Seville – Officer – 2016
- Carmen – Chorus – 2016
- Simon Boccanegra – Chorus – 2016
- La bohème – Chorus – 2016
- Carmen – Chorus – 2016
- The Love for Three Oranges – Chorus – 2016
- Pagliacci – Chorus – 2017
- Cavalleria rusticana – Chorus – 2017
- King Roger – Chorus – 2017
- Verdi Requiem – Chorus – 2017
- Parsifal – Chorus – 2017
- Carmen – Chorus – 2018
- La bohème – Sergeant – 2018
- Aida – Chorus – 2018
- Anna Bolena – Chorus – 2019
- Andrea Chénier – Chorus – 2019

== Awards, achievements and roles ==
Institution/Company	Award/Achievement/Role	Year
Sydney Conservatorium of Music	Mary Patricia Bell Scholarship	2004
Opera Australia	Chorus	2009–2019
Pacific Opera	Young Artist Programme	2010
Sydney University	Judge Turpin, Sweeney Todd	2010
Guildhall School of Music and Drama	Artist Masters Programme	2013
Diva Opera	Un Ufficiale, The Barber of Seville	2013
London Contemporary Opera	Chorus, The Schmürz	2013
Australian Music Foundation Awards	Finalist	2013
St. Paul's Opera	Betto, Gianni Schicchi	2013
Guildhall School of Music and Drama	Drum Maker (Cover), The Adventures of Pinocchio – Dove	2013
Guildhall School of Music and Drama	Chorus, The Adventures of Pinocchio – Dove	2013
Guildhall School of Music and Drama	Rocco, Fidelio (Scenes)	2014
Guildhall School of Music and Drama	Leporello, Don Giovanni (Scenes)	2014
Guildhall School of Music and Drama	Dr. Dulcamara, L'elisir d'amore (Scenes)	2014
34th National Liederfest	Winner	2015
Rockdale Opera Company	Count Almaviva, The Marriage of Figaro	2015
Open Lieder Prize (Wollongong Eisteddfod)	Winner	2015
Open Aria Prize (Wollongong Eisteddfod)	Finalist	2016
Bel Canto Award (JS&RB Foundation Bel Canto Awards)	Finalist	2016
Sanderson Award (JS&RB Foundation Bel Canto Awards)	Winner	2016
Hawaii Performing Arts Awards (JS&RB Foundation Bel Canto Awards)	Winner	2016
Sydney Eisteddfod Opera Scholarship	Semi-finalist	2015
Opera Australia	Officer, The Barber of Seville	2016
Opera Australia	Sergeant, La bohème	2018
Sydney International Song Prize (JS&RB Foundation)	Finalist	2019
Sydney Eisteddfod Open Male Operatic Voice Prize	Winner	2019
Sydney Eisteddfod Open Lieder Prize	Winner	2019
Sydney Eisteddfod Open French & German Art Song Prize	Winner	2019
