= Robyn Ann Ewing =

Australian tertiary educator (1955 -

Robyn Ann Ewing AM (born 1955) is an Emerita Professor in Teacher Education and the Arts at the University of Sydney. She is a co-director of Creativity in Research, Engaging the Arts, Transforming Education, Health and Wellbeing (CREATE) Centre.

In the 2015 Australia Day Honours, she became a member of the Order of Australia, "For significant service to tertiary education through academic and administrative roles, to professional organisations, and to the arts''.

In her early career, she wrote under her married name of Robyn Cusworth, and under this name she earned her doctorate in 1995 from Sydney University with a thesis entitled The framing of educational knowledge through newstime in junior primary classrooms.

Her work includes a focus on the role of arts-rich pedagogy on our lives and learning. She has focused on the contribution drama and quality literature can make to becoming deeply literate alongside nurturing our imaginations and creativity. Other research interests include professional learning and co-mentoring, innovative pre-service teacher education, the experiences of early career teachers and early literacy development. Her commitment to drama and literacy education has led to her working as an academic partner with many schools and arts organisations including the Sydney Theatre Company, the Australian Theatre for Young People, Barking Gecko theatre, and Big Sky Stories.

== Career ==
Ewing earned a B.Ed Hon (1976) in primary teaching and taught in several schools before joining Sydney University's Faculty of Education, in 1989. She has lectured in primary curriculum, English Education and Teaching and Learning over many years and held numerous roles including Acting Dean, Associate Dean (Teaching and Learning) and Co-Director of the Master of Teaching. She is past president of the Primary English Teaching Association and the Australian Literacy Educators Association and a former Council member of the Australian Film Television and Radio School. She is a recipient of the Lady Cutler Award for Distinguished Service to Children's Literature and Vice Chancellor's Awards for Excellent Teaching and Higher Degree Research Supervision.

== Selected Publications ==
=== Edited Books ===
- (2022) Learning How to Make Meaning in Primary Classrooms
- (2022) Reflective Practice in Education and Social Work Interdisciplinary Explorations
- (2023) Teaching: Dilemmas, Challenges and Opportunities | 7th Edition ISBN 9780170462136
- (2016) 'Beyond the script take 3: Drama in the English and literacy Classroom'|3rd Edition]ISBN 978-1-925132-32-8)
- (2011) 'The Arts and Australian Education: Realising Potential' AER 58.ISBN 9780864318077

=== Articles ===
- Robyn Ann Ewing; Jo Padgham (21 January 2025). "Learning to be literate and the importance of fairness and equity: Touchstone 1" (PDF). Qualitative Research Journal. 25 (1): 3–9. doi:10.1108/QRJ-10-2024-0262. ISSN 1448-0980. Wikidata Q136676594.
- Robyn Ewing; Carole Miller; Terry Locke (2014). "Editorial: An Arts-led English and literacy curriculum" (PDF). English Teaching: Practice and Critique. 13 (2): 1–4. ISSN 1175-8708. Wikidata Q136676636.
- Robyn Ann Ewing; DAVID LANGLEY SMITH (May 2003). "Retaining quality beginning teachers in the profession" (PDF). English Teaching: Practice and Critique. 2 (1): 15–32. ISSN 1175-8708. Wikidata Q136676614.
