= Brian Sully =

Australian judge and legal scholar (1936–2019)

Brian Thomas Sully AM QC (3 February 1936 – 6 March 2019) was an Australian judge and legal scholar. He served as a justice of the Supreme Court of New South Wales from 1989 to 2007.

Sully was an adjunct professor of law at the Western Sydney University. He lectured in advocacy although he lectured in Criminal Procedure and Evidence in 2007. Sully donated his collection of legal books and judicial robes to the university, which are on display in the Faculty of Law in Campbelltown.

Sully died on 6 March 2019. He was made a life member of the New South Wales Bar Association shortly before his death.

== Education ==
Sully studied law at the University of Sydney graduating in 1959.

== Career ==
Sully was admitted to practice as a solicitor in 1959. In 1962, Sully was called to the NSW Bar. Following 17 years of running a busy, broad professional practice, Sully was appointed as Her Majesty's Counsel in 1979.

Sully served as a Justice of the Supreme Court of NSW from 1989 to 2007. From 1997 to 2000, Sully was Chairman of the Legal Qualifications Committee.

Following Sully's compulsory retirement from the bench of the Supreme Court, he became an adjunct professor of law at the University of Western Sydney. Sully formerly lectured in advocacy during autumn at the Law School. Sully also coached students in mooting for the internal Witness Examination Competition during the Autumn Semester.

Sully, among two other guests from either the Bench or the Bar, previously Judged the Internal Championship Moot held at the Supreme Court of NSW every year.

== Donation to the University of Western Sydney ==
The Honourable Brian Sully AM QC has kindly donated his Judicial Robes and personal Library to the University of Western Sydney.

The Robes are on display in a sealed cabinet in Building 22 of the University of Western Sydney, Campbelltown Campus.

Sully donated three sets of robes to the Law School. One set of robes is worn by a Justice of the Supreme Court when sitting in a civil case at the hearing, of which it is also customary for Counsel to robe. The second set on display is the customary court dress of a Justice of the Supreme Court when is sitting in a criminal case, or at the hearing of either an application or an appeal in the Court of Criminal Appeal. The third set is the ceremonial dress of a Judge of the Supreme Court and is only worn on very formal occasions, such as the swearing in of a new Judge.

The display also includes day-dress wigs, ‘full-bottomed’ wigs, Barrister's wigs and wig-tins, a bar jacket and black silk robe, cuff links, white kid gloves, two loose scarlet items known as ‘casting hoods’, and two white detachable shirt cuffs known as ‘weepers’.

In addition to the collection of robes and wigs, Sully also donated his personal professional library to the Law School. It is also housed in dedicated shelving in two rooms in Building 22. The collection, which has been named ‘The Sully Collection’, has been designated as a Law Resource Library available, essentially, for the assistance of the academic staff at Campbelltown.

The above collections were made on two conditions. Sully states, “I made the donation with two attached conditions: one, that the books should be shelved and actually used; the other, that the collection be kept together".

== Honours ==
On Australia Day in 2015, Sully was awarded a Member of the Order of Australia for his significant service to the judiciary, and to the law, particularly through legal education in New South Wales. On 14 February 2019 the Bar Council resolved by acclamation to confer Life Membership of the NSW Bar Association on Sully. A certificate of Life Membership was presented to him by the President, Tim Game SC, at a small private gathering of friends and family including members of the judiciary and former colleagues of 12th floor Wentworth Selborne on the evening of 20 February 2019.
