= Rosalind Croucher =

Australian lawyer and academic

Rosalind Croucher AM FAAL
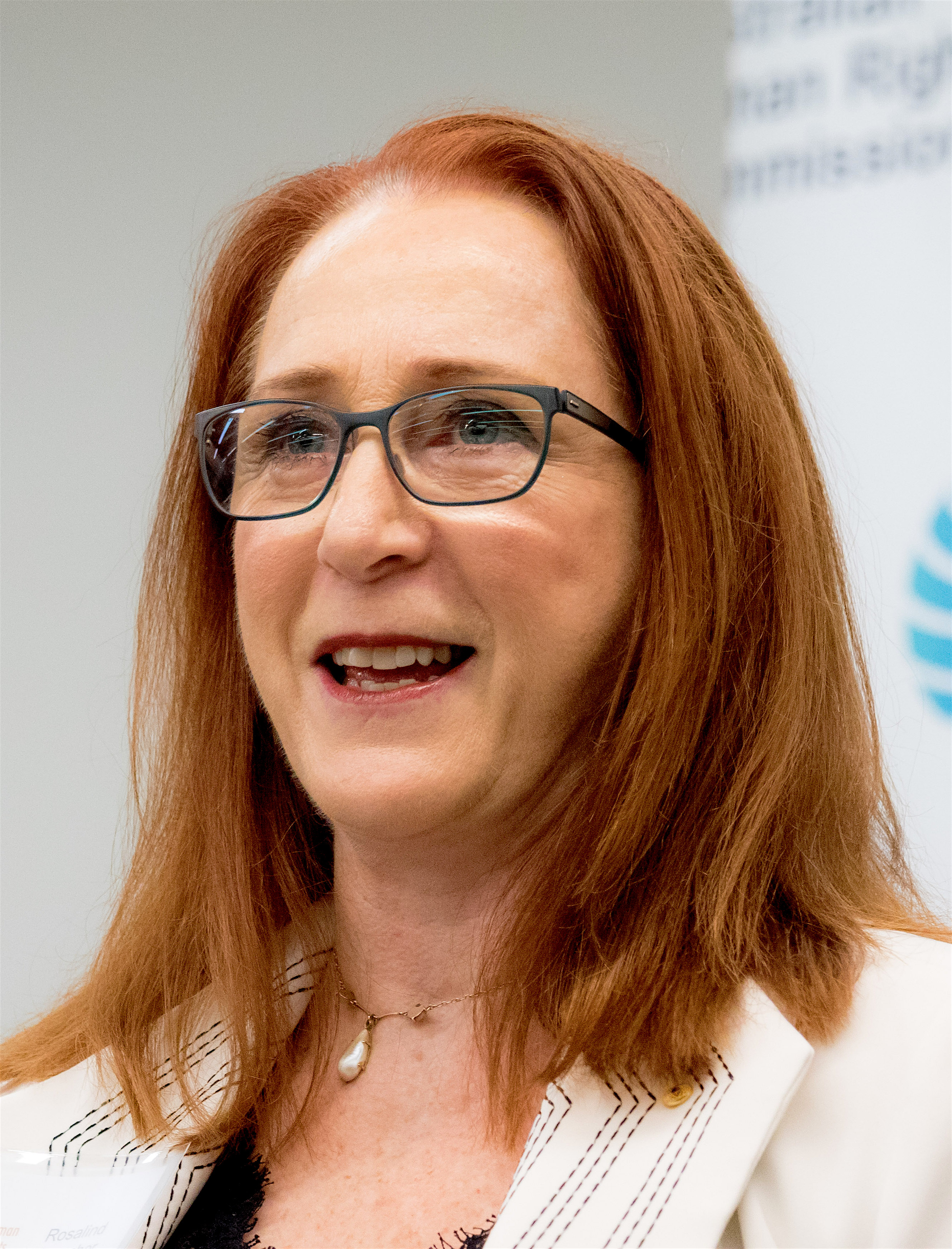
- Croucher in 2017

President of the Australian Human Rights Commission
- In office 30 July 2017 – 29 July 2024
- Appointed by: George Brandis
- Preceded by: Gillian Triggs
- Succeeded by: Hugh de Kretser

President of the Australian Law Reform Commission
- In office December 2009 – July 2017
- Preceded by: David Weisbrot
- Succeeded by: Robert Cornall (acting); Sarah Derrington (substantive)

Personal details
- Born: Rosalind Frances McGrath; 14 November 1954 (age 72) Sydney, New South Wales, Australia
- Citizenship: Australian
- Spouses: Michael Atherton (m. 1976; div. 2001) John Croucher (m. 2004)
- Education: University of Sydney; University of New South Wales
- Profession: Academic; Lawyer

Rosalind Frances Croucher AM FAAL (born 14 November 1954) is an Australian lawyer and academic who was the President of the Australian Human Rights Commission from July 2017 to July 2024. She was previously President of the Australian Law Reform Commission from December 2009 until July 2017, having served as a full-time commissioner since 2007.

== Education ==
Croucher graduated with a Bachelor of Arts with Honours and a Bachelor of Laws from the University of Sydney and completed her Doctor of Philosophy in legal history at the University of New South Wales. She was admitted as a legal practitioner in New South Wales in 1981.

== Academic career ==
In 1997 to 1998, Croucher was the Acting Dean of the Sydney Law School and then the Deputy Chair of the University of Sydney Academic Board in 1999. She then moved to Macquarie University as the Dean of the Macquarie Law School from 1999 to 2007. From 2002 to 2003, Croucher was the Chair of the Council of Australian Law Deans and the vice-president of the International Academy of Estate and Trust Law from 2000 to 2005.

Croucher's academic expertise as a lecturer and researcher is in the fields of equity, trusts, property, inheritance and legal history. She has written or edited nine books, including Succession: Families, Property and Death, Families and Estates: A Comparative Study, and Law and Religion – God, the State and the Common Law. She has also authored over 100 publications including book chapters, encyclopedia entries, journal articles, casenotes and conference papers.

== Law Reform Commission ==
Croucher was appointed a full-time Commissioner of the Australian Law Reform Commission by the Howard government in 2007 and was made President in 2009. Croucher was reappointed President in 2014 and subsequently in 2015 for a further three-year term.

Croucher was the Commissioner-in-charge of nine significant law reform inquiries including into Client Legal Privilege, Secrecy Laws, Family Violence, Discovery, Age Barriers, Disability Laws, the Freedoms Inquiry, and the Elder Abuse Inquiry.

== Human Rights Commission ==
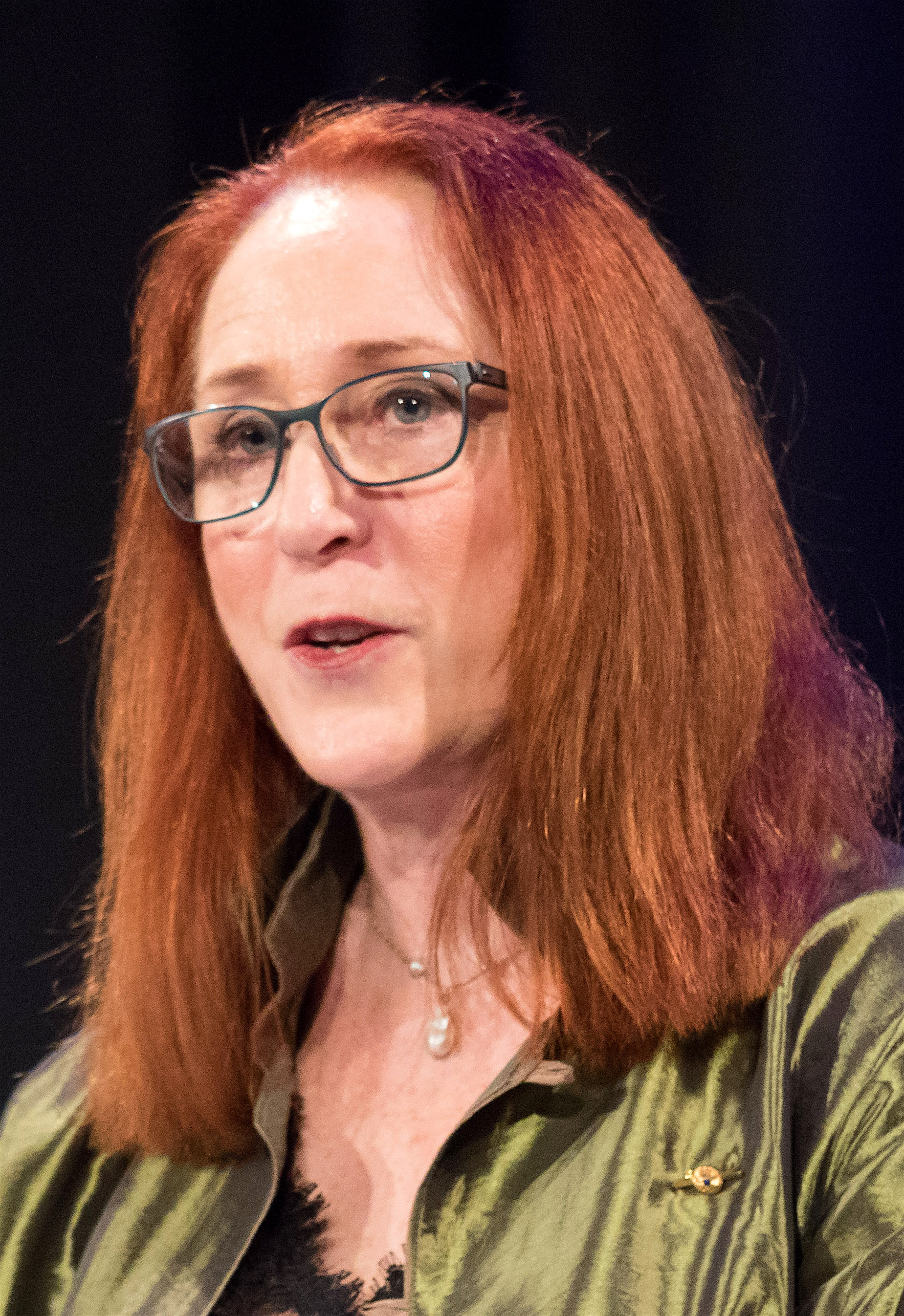
Croucher speaking at the 2017 Human Rights Awards

On 20 June 2017, Attorney-General George Brandis announced that Croucher would be appointed President of the Australian Human Rights Commission in place of Gillian Triggs. Her seven-year term began on 30 July 2017.

In March 2018, Croucher wrote a report recommending that compensation be awarded to a man because he was refused employment by banking and insurance company Suncorp Group. The man had previously been convicted and sentenced to 12 months' jail in 2008 for accessing child pornography via a "carriage service" and for possession of child pornography, and did not disclose the convictions to the company in his initial online application. Croucher defended her report on the basis that, under Australian law, people should not be discriminated against in employment because of their criminal record, if the criminal record did not prevent them from carrying out the "inherent requirements" of the job.

== Honours ==
Croucher was honoured as a Foundation Fellow of the Australian Academy of Law in 2007. She was appointed an Honorary Fellow of St Andrew's College of the University of Sydney in 2002, an Honorary Fellow of the Australian College of Legal Medicine in 2004, and an Honorary Life Member of the Women Lawyers' Association of New South Wales in 2013.

She was recognised as one of the 40 'inspirational alumni' of the University of New South Wales in 2011 and was acknowledged for her contributions to public policy as one of Australia's '100 Women of Influence' by the Australian Financial Review and Westpac.

Croucher was appointed a Member of the Order of Australia in the 2015 Australia Day Honours list for "significant service to the law as an academic, to legal reform and education, to professional development, and to the arts".

== Personal life ==
Croucher is married to fellow academic John Croucher. Her father, Frank McGrath, was a judge, and her maternal grandfather, John Cumpston, was the first Director-General of Public Health of the Commonwealth Department of Health. She played the oboe and cor anglais in the Australian Youth Orchestra in 1974.

Legal offices
Preceded by Gillian Triggs	President of the Australian Human Rights Commission; 2017–2024	Succeeded by Hugh de Kretser
