= Lauren Fagan =

Australian operatic soprano

Lauren Fagan is an Australian operatic soprano, internationally known for performances in notable productions. A nominee for Young Singer of the Year in the 2018 International Opera Awards, she won the 2019 Dame Heather Begg Memorial Award to support the development of emerging opera singers from Australia or New Zealand.

== Biography ==
=== Early life and education ===
Fagan grew up in Sydney, and received a business degree in Australia, before studying at London's Guildhall School of Music and Drama, and joining The Royal Opera's Jette Parker Young Artists Programme. During her training, she performed the role of Micaëla in Bizet's Carmen, the title role in Janáček's Jenůfa, the Marschallin in Strauss's Der Rosenkavalier, Natascha in Prokofiev's War and Peace, Vitellia in Mozart's La Clemenza di Tito, Alice in Verdi's Falstaff, Fiordiligi in Mozart's Così fan tutte, and the First Lady in Mozart's The Magic Flute.

Toward the end of her studies, she was a member of the Glyndebourne Festival Choir, where she sang in Tchaikovsky's Eugene Onegin, and Mozart's Don Giovanni, and performed the role of Annina in La Traviata. She also played the role of Lia in Debussy's L'enfant prodigue at the Barbican Centre, the Blue Fairy in Jonathan Dove's The Adventures of Pinocchio, participated in the Banff Summer Arts Festival in Canada as Mrs. Coyle in Britten's opera Owen Wingrave, sang Frasquita in Bizet's Carmen, and took part in the Australian premiere of Jake Heggie's opera Dead Man Walking.

=== Career ===
From 2014 to 2016, Fagan participated in the Jette Parker Young Artists Programme at the Royal Opera House in London. During this time, she performed roles such as Oscar in Verdi's Un ballo in maschera, Giulia in Rossini's La scala di seta, Gianetta in Donizetti's L'elisir d'amore, the Girl in Weill's Rise and Fall of the City of Mahagonny, Papagena in Mozart's The Magic Flute, Lila in David Bruce's The Firework-Maker's Daughter, the Lover in Puccini's Il tabarro, Sister Genovieffa in Puccini's Suor Angelica, and Ines in Verdi's Il trovatore. During this period, she worked with conductors such as Nicola Luisotti, Gianandrea Noseda, Sir Mark Elder, Daniel Oren, Christian Curnyn, Cornelius Meister, Daniele Rustioni, and Ivor Bolton.

In the 2016/2017 opera season, she made her debut as Musetta in Puccini's La Bohème with the Welsh National Opera throughout the UK and on tour in Dubai. She also sang Donna Anna in Mozart's Don Giovanni for Opera Holland Park in London and at the 2016 Verbier Festival.

In the 2017/2018 season, she performed as Roxana in concert performances of Szymanowski's Król Roger at the Accademia Nazionale di Santa Cecilia in Rome, conducted by Sir Antonio Pappano. She also performed Donna Elvira in Mozart's Don Giovanni with the NHK Symphony Orchestra under Paavo Järvi, sang Agnès in George Benjamin's Written on Skin with the Melos Sinfonia under Oliver Zeffman in London and St. Petersburg, and returned to Opera Holland Park in London for her debut as Verdi's heroine Violetta in La Traviata.
