= List of judges of the Supreme Court of Norfolk Island =

The Judges of the Supreme Court of Norfolk Island are generally appointed from among Justices of the Federal Court who may sit on the Australian mainland or they may convene the court on Norfolk Island depending on the type of matter they may be dealing with.

Supreme Court sittings are generally conducted on a circuit court basis with Judges attending on Norfolk Island where the volume of work may be sufficient to justify the travel or where a regular court sitting has not been convened for some time or where the law governing a particular matter may require that the court be convened on Norfolk Island and not elsewhere (e.g. most criminal law matters except sexual offences which may now be tried off-island).

The Court staff are generally resident on Norfolk Island.

List of Judges (including Chief Justices)

Position	Name	Appointment commenced	Appointment ended	Term	Comments	Notes
Chief Judge	Russell Fox AC, QC	22 January 1982	31 March 1989	7 years, 68 days	Federal Court	
Chief Judge	Trevor Morling	9 May 1989	1 February 1993	3 years, 268 days years	Federal Court	
Chief Justice	Bryan Beaumont AO	6 July 1993	2 August 2004	11 years, 27 days	Federal Court	
Chief Justice	Mark Weinberg	16 December 2004	19 July 2008	3 years, 216 days	Federal Court; ACT Supreme Court	
Chief Justice	Peter Jacobson	12 December 2008	25 January 2015	6 years, 44 days	Federal Court	
Chief Justice	Anthony Besanko	26 February 2015	7 May 2024	9 years, 71 days	Federal Court; ACT Supreme Court	
Chief Justice	Robert Bromwich	7 May 2024		304 days	Federal Court	
Judge	Sir Richard Eggleston KC	27 October 1960	1969	8–9 years	Commonwealth Industrial Court (1960–1974); ACT Supreme Court (1960–1974)	
Judge	Sir Percy Joske CMG	10 December 1965	31 December 1977	12 years, 21 days	Commonwealth Industrial Court (1960–1977); ACT Supreme Court (1960–1977); NT Supreme Court (1961–1977)	
Judge	Edward Dunphy KC	17 March 1969	31 December 1982	13 years, 289 days	Commonwealth Industrial Court (1956–1982); ACT Supreme Court (1958–1982); Supreme Court of Christmas Island (1961–1982); Supreme Court of the Cocos (Keeling) Islands (1961–1982); Court of Appeal of Nauru (1967–1982)	
Judge	Robert St John	2 August 1978	31 March 1985	6 years, 241 days	Federal Court; Australian Industrial Court; ACT Supreme Court; NT Supreme Court	
Judge	Phillip Evatt DSC	11 February 1981	28 February 1987	6 years, 4 days	Federal Court	
Judge	Trevor Morling QC	8 March 1984	1 February 1993	8 years, 330 days	Federal Court	
Judge	Murray Wilcox AO, QC	6 July 1993	2 October 2006	13 years, 88 days	Chief Justice of Industrial Relations Court; Federal Court; ACT Supreme Court	
Judge	Bryan Beaumont AO	1989	2004	14–15 years	Federal Court	
Judge	Susan Kiefel AC	16 December 2004	3 September 2007	2 years, 261 days	Federal Court	
Judge	Peter Jacobson	28 June 2007	25 January 2015	7 years, 211 days	Federal Court	
Judge	Garry Downes AM	10 April 2008	15 May 2012	4 years, 35 days	Federal Court	
Judge	Bruce Lander	12 December 2008	31 August 2013	4 years, 262 days	Federal Court; ACT Supreme Court	
Judge	Robert Buchanan KC	2013	10 September 2016	2–3 years	Federal Court	
Judge	Anthony Besanko	5 August 2013		11 years, 214 days	Federal Court; ACT Supreme Court	
Judge	John Gilmour	26 February 2015		10 years, 9 days	Federal Court	
Judge	Michael Wigney	15 June 2017		7 years, 265 days	Federal Court; ACT Supreme Court	
Judge	Steven Rares	12 June 2018		6 years, 268 days	Federal Court; ACT Supreme Court; Supreme Court of Norfolk Island; Admiralty Rules Committee	
