= List of judges of the Supreme Court of the Australian Capital Territory =

Judges of the Supreme Court of the Australian Capital Territory as of March 2022, including Chief Justices, Judges, Acting Judges, Additional Judges and Masters / Associate Justices.

Position	Name	Term begin	Term end	Term
Chief Judge / Chief Justice (Note: On 7 May 1982 the title was changed from Chief Judge to Chief Justice.)	Russell Fox (Note: Chief Justice who previously served as a Judge.)	1 January 1977	3 November 1977	306 days
Chief Judge / Chief Justice	Sir Richard Blackburn	7 November 1977	31 March 1985	7 years, 144 days
Chief Judge / Chief Justice	Jeffrey Miles	17 June 1985	30 September 2002	17 years, 105 days
Chief Judge / Chief Justice	Terrence Higgins	31 January 2003	13 September 2013	10 years, 225 days
Chief Judge / Chief Justice	Helen Murrell	28 October 2013	4 March 2022	8 years, 127 days
Chief Judge / Chief Justice	Lucy McCallum	8 March 2022		2 years, 362 days
President Court of Appeal	Malcolm Gray	21 December 2007	29 July 2011	3 years, 220 days
Judge	Lionel Lukin	25 January 1934	31 October 1943	9 years, 279 days
Judge	Thomas Clyne	25 November 1943	18 October 1945	1 year, 327 days
Judge	William Simpson	24 October 1945	30 April 1960	14 years, 189 days
Judge	Sir Reginald Smithers	22 June 1966	2 November 1966	133 days
Judge	Sir John Kerr	22 June 1966	2 November 1966	133 days
Judge	Russell Fox (Note: Judge who later served as a Chief Justice.)	7 August 1967	31 January 1977	9 years, 177 days
Judge	Sir Richard Blackburn	28 May 1971	6 November 1977	6 years, 162 days
Judge	Francis Xavier Connor	7 March 1972	17 March 1982	10 years, 10 days
Judge	Douglas McGregor	7 November 1977	7 December 1979	2 years, 30 days
Judge	John Kelly	10 March 1980	30 June 1990	10 years, 112 days
Judge	John Gallop	14 May 1982	31 July 2000	18 years, 78 days
Judge	Terrence Higgins	2 July 1990	30 January 2003	12 years, 212 days
Judge	Ken Crispin	29 September 1997	October 2007	10 years, 2 days
Judge	Malcolm Gray	12 October 2000	July 29, 2011	10 years, 290 days
Judge	Terry Connolly	31 January 2003	25 September 2007	4 years, 237 days
Judge	Hilary Penfold	1 February 2008	23 March 2018	17 years, 32 days
Judge	Richard Refshauge	1 February 2008	11 May 2017	9 years, 99 days
Judge	John Burns	1 August 2011	31 August 2021	10 years, 30 days
Judge	Michael Elkaim	4 July 2016		8 years, 244 days
Judge	David Mossop	13 February 2017		8 years, 20 days
Judge	Chrissa Loukas-Karlsson	26 March 2018		6 years, 344 days
Acting Judge	George Dethridge	1 October 1935	30 November 1935	60 days
Acting Judge	Harold Piper	1 March 1939	30 November 1939	274 days
Acting Judge	Harold Piper	10 October 1942	31 October 1942	21 days
Acting Judge	Harold Piper	13 November 1942	31 October 1943	352 days
Acting Judge	Kenneth John Carruthers	1 May 1995	22 December 1995	235 days
Acting Judge	Alan Hogan	8 July 1996	13 December 1996	158 days
Acting Judge	Jeffrey Miles (Note: Acting Judge who previously served as Chief Justice.)	1 October 2002	31 December 2005	3 years, 91 days
Acting Judge	John Nield	26 July 2010	2011	0–1 years
Acting Judge	John Nield	29 July 2015	28 January 2016	183 days
Acting Judge	Jane Mathews	26 July 2010	2011	0–1 years
Acting Judge	Bernard Teague	1 September 2010	2011	0–1 years
Acting Judge	Margaret Sidis	9 April 2012	11 May 2014	12 years, 330 days
Acting Judge	Linda Ashford	1 July 2014	19 June 2020	5 years, 354 days
Acting Judge	Stephen Walmsley	1 July 2014		10 years, 247 days
Acting Judge	Dennis Cowdroy	1 July 2014	30 July 2016	1 year, 365 days
Acting Judge	David Robinson	1 July 2014		10 years, 247 days
Acting Judge	Anthony Whealy	December 2014	15 December 2015	1 year
Acting Judge	David Ashley	20 July 2015	19 July 2016	365 days
Acting Judge	Murray Kellam	8 March 2017	19 March 2020	3 years, 11 days
Acting Judge	Robert Crowe	1 June 2019	31 May 2020	365 days
Acting Judge	Robert Crowe	1 June 2021		3 years, 277 days
Acting Judge	Peter Graeme Berman	1 June 2019		5 years, 277 days
Acting Judge	Audrey Suzanne Balla	1 June 2019		5 years, 277 days
Acting Judge	Verity McWilliam	21 December 2020		4 years, 74 days
Acting Judge	Megan Latham	1 June 2021		3 years, 277 days
Acting Judge	John Burns	1 November 2021		3 years, 124 days
Acting Judge	Stephen Norrish	1 November 2021		3 years, 124 days
Additional Judge (Note: Introduced in 1958, Additional Judges are judges of other federal courts (such as the Federal Court of Australia) who serve part-time with the Supreme Court in order to reduce the workload on the full Judges.)	Edward Dunphy	1 October 1958	31 December 1982	24 years, 91 days
Additional Judge	Sir Edward Morgan	14 October 1958	31 May 1960	1 year, 230 days
Additional Judge	Sir Percy Joske	4 June 1960	21 December 1977	17 years, 200 days
Additional Judge	Sir Richard Eggleston	16 June 1960	31 May 1974	13 years, 349 days
Additional Judge	Alan Bridge	9 July 1964	28 July 1966	2 years, 19 days
Additional Judge	Sir Reginald Smithers (Note: Additional Judge who previously served as a Judge.)	18 December 1964	October 1986	21 years, 287–317 days
Additional Judge	Sir John Kerr	3 November 1966	22 May 1972	5 years, 201 days
Additional Judge	Sir Harry Gibbs	20 July 1967	1 August 1970	3 years, 12 days
Additional Judge	Charles Sweeney	1 May 1969	1 July 1971	2 years, 61 days
Additional Judge	Sir John Nimmo	2 May 1969	26 March 1974	4 years, 328 days
Additional Judge	Sir Edward Woodward	25 February 1972	1990	17–18 years
Additional Judge	Robert Franki	25 May 1972	1986	13–14 years
Additional Judge	John Sweeney	5 September 1974	7 May 1981	6 years, 244 days
Additional Judge	Phillip Evatt	6 September 1974	unknown	
Additional Judge	Robert St John	9 April 1975	31 March 1985	9 years, 356 days
Additional Judge	Raymond Northrop	23 March 1976	31 August 1998	22 years, 161 days
Additional Judge	Gerard Brennan	22 July 1976	12 February 1981	4 years, 205 days
Additional Judge	Douglas McGregor	8 December 1979	15 June 1985	5 years, 189 days
Additional Judge	Daryl Davies	17 May 1978	20 December 1998	20 years, 217 days
Additional Judge	John Lockhart	17 January 1979	11 June 1999	20 years, 145 days
Additional Judge	Ian Sheppard	20 March 1980	23 May 1997	17 years, 64 days
Additional Judge	Trevor Morling	11 February 1981	1993	11–12 years
Additional Judge	Tony Fitzgerald	19 November 1981	20 June 1984	2 years, 214 days
Additional Judge	Kenneth Jenkinson	26 May 1983	13 January 1997	13 years, 232 days
Additional Judge	Bryan Beaumont	3 June 1983	11 June 2002	19 years, 8 days
Additional Judge	Murray Wilcox	23 April 1983	30 September 2006	23 years, 160 days
Additional Judge	Jeffrey Spender	23 April 1983	19 July 2010	27 years, 87 days
Additional Judge	Cecil Pincus	23 April 1985	16 December 1991	6 years, 237 days
Additional Judge	Michael Foster	25 November 1987	27 November 1998	11 years, 2 days
Additional Judge	Donnell Ryan	27 April 1989	2 June 2011	22 years, 36 days
Additional Judge	John von Doussa	17 April 1989	6 June 2003	14 years, 50 days
Additional Judge	Margaret Beazley	22 June 1994	26 April 1996	1 year, 309 days
Additional Judge	Antony Whitlam	7 April 1995	30 April 2005	10 years, 23 days
Additional Judge	Marcus Einfeld	12 August 1996	16 April 2001	4 years, 247 days
Additional Judge	Rodney Madgwick	12 August 1996	21 April 2008	11 years, 253 days
Additional Judge	Richard Cooper	1 October 1996	14 March 2005	8 years, 164 days
Additional Judge	Roger Gyles	12 February 2001	22 August 2008	7 years, 192 days
Additional Judge	Mark Weinberg	17 February 2003	18 July 2008	5 years, 152 days
Additional Judge	Robert French	November 2003	1 September 2008	4 years, 276–305 days
Additional Judge	Donald Hill	November 2003	25 August 2005	1 year, 268–297 days
Additional Judge	Michael Moore	November 2003	1 August 2011	7–8 years 2801 273-244 days 7 years, 273–244 days
Additional Judge	Brian Tamberlin	November 2003	29 March 2009	5 years, 119–148 days
Additional Judge	Shane Marshall	November 2003	16 September 2013	9 years, 290–319 days
Additional Judge	Anthony North	November 2003	7 September 2018	15 years, 281–310 days
Additional Judge	Margaret Stone	November 2003	22 March 2012	8 years, 113–142 days
Additional Judge	James Allsop	November 2003	7 April 2008	4 years, 129–158 days
Additional Judge	Bradley Selway	November 2003	11 April 2005	1 year, 132–161 days
Additional Judge	Annabelle Bennett	November 2003	23 March 2016	12 years, 114–143 days
Additional Judge	Bruce Lander	November 2003	31 August 2013	9 years, 274–303 days
Additional Judge	John Dowsett	August 2004	26 April 2018	13 years, 238–268 days
Additional Judge	Dennis Cowdroy	March 2007	15 March 2014	6–7 years
Additional Judge	Peter Graham	March 2007	6 September 2010	3 years, 159–189 days
Additional Judge	Richard Edmonds	March 2007	10 February 2016	8 years, 316–346 days
Additional Judge	Steven Rares	March 2007		17–18 years
Additional Judge	Anthony Besanko	March 2007		17–18 years
Additional Judge	John Mansfield	11 September 2008	24 August 2016	7 years, 348 days
Additional Judge	Robert Buchanan	11 September 2008	9 September 2016	7 years, 364 days
Additional Judge	Lindsay Foster	11 November 2009		15 years, 114 days
Additional Judge	Jayne Jagot	11 November 2009		15 years, 114 days
Additional Judge	Anna Katzmann	17 September 2010		14 years, 169 days
Additional Judge	John Gilmour	6 July 2012		12 years, 242 days
Additional Judge	Michael Wigney	9 December 2013		11 years, 86 days
Additional Judge	Melissa Perry	14 May 2014		10 years, 295 days
Additional Judge	Berna Collier	3 May 2016		8 years, 306 days
Additional Judge	Robert Bromwich	5 September 2016		8 years, 181 days
Additional Judge	Natalie Charlesworth	14 November 2017		7 years, 111 days
Additional Judge	Katrina Banks-Smith	22 August 2019		5 years, 195 days
Master / Associate Judge (Note: From 21 April 2015 the title of Master was changed to Associate Judge.)	Alan Hogan	20 December 1989	4 January 1996	6 years, 15 days
Master / Associate Judge	Terry Connolly	19 February 1996	30 December 2003	7 years, 314 days
Master / Associate Judge	David Harper	7 April 2003	21 May 2013	10 years, 44 days
Master / Associate Judge	David Mossop	22 May 2013	12 February 2017	3 years, 266 days
Master / Associate Judge	Verity McWilliam	26 June 2017		7 years, 252 days
