= List of judges of the Commonwealth Industrial Court / Australian Industrial Court =

Judges who served on the Commonwealth Industrial Court or when it was renamed the Australian Industrial Court are:

Combined list of judges of the Commonwealth Industrial Court / Australian Industrial Court
Position	Name	From	To	Term	Comments	Notes
Chief Judge	Sir John Spicer	15 August 1956	1 November 1976	20 years, 78 days	Formerly the Australian Attorney-General	
Judge	Edward Dunphy	16 May 1949	31 December 1982	33 years, 229 days	A judge of the Commonwealth Court of Conciliation and Arbitration, judge of the supreme courts of the Australian Capital Territory, Christmas, Cocos (Keeling) & Norfolk Islands	
Judge	Sir Edward Morgan	4 August 1952	31 May 1960	7 years, 301 days	A judge of the Commonwealth Court of Conciliation and Arbitration, judge of the Supreme Court (ACT)	
Judge	Sir Percy Joske CMG	3 June 1960	31 December 1977	17 years, 211 days	Judge of the supreme courts of the Australian Capital Territory & Norfolk Island	
Judge	Sir Richard Eggleston	4 June 1960	30 June 1974	14 years, 26 days	Judge of the supreme courts of the Australian Capital Territory & Norfolk Island	
Judge	Sir Reginald Smithers	20 January 1965	30 September 1986	21 years, 253 days	Judge of the Supreme Court (ACT)	
Judge	(Sir) John Kerr	3 November 1966	22 May 1972	5 years, 201 days	Formerly a judge of the Supreme Court (ACT), appointed Chief Justice of NSW	
Judge	Sir John Nimmo	29 April 1969	30 June 1980	11 years, 62 days	Judge of the Supreme Court (ACT)	
Judge	Edward Woodward	18 May 1972	31 July 1990	18 years, 74 days	Judge of the Supreme Court (ACT)	
Judge	Robert Franki	23 May 1972	5 August 1986	14 years, 74 days	Formerly a Deputy President of the Commonwealth Conciliation and Arbitration Commission, judge of the Supreme Court (ACT)	
Judge	John Sweeney	30 November 1973	7 May 1981	7 years, 158 days	Formerly a Deputy President of the Commonwealth Conciliation and Arbitration Commission, judge of the Supreme Court (ACT)	
Judge	Phillip Evatt DSC	2 July 1974	28 February 1987	12 years, 241 days	Judge of the supreme courts of the Australian Capital Territory & Norfolk Island	
Judge	Robert St John	15 April 1975	31 March 1985	9 years, 350 days	Judge of the supreme courts of the Australian Capital Territory & Norfolk Island	
Judge	Ray Northrop	9 March 1976	31 August 1998	22 years, 175 days	Judge of the Supreme Court (ACT)	
Judge	(Sir) Gerard Brennan	28 June 1976	12 February 1981	4 years, 229 days	Judge of the Supreme Court (ACT), appointed to the High Court	
