= List of judges of the Commonwealth Court of Conciliation and Arbitration =

Judges who served on the Commonwealth Court of Conciliation and Arbitration are:

Position	Name	Appointment commenced	Appointment ended	Term in office	Comments	Notes
President	Richard O'Connor	10 February 1905	13 September 1907	2 years, 215 days	Judge of the High Court	
President	H. B. Higgins	14 September 1907	29 June 1921	13 years, 288 days	Judge of the High Court	
President	Charles Powers	30 June 1921	25 June 1926	4 years, 360 days	Judge of the High Court	
Chief Judge	George Dethridge	20 July 1926	29 December 1938	12 years, 162 days		
Chief Judge	George Beeby	15 March 1939	31 July 1941	2 years, 138 days		
Chief Judge	Harold Piper	1 August 1941	16 June 1947	5 years, 319 days		
Chief Judge	Edmund Drake-Brockman	17 June 1947	1 June 1949	1 year, 359 days		
Chief Judge	Sir Raymond Kelly	30 June 1949	25 July 1956	7 years, 25 days		
Deputy President	Charles Powers	10 October 1914	30 April 1920	5 years, 203 days	Judge of the High Court	
Deputy President	Sir John Quick	26 June 1922	25 March 1930	16 years, 10 days		
Deputy President	Noel Webb	26 June 1922	12 February 1927	4 years, 231 days		
Judge	Lionel Lukin	20 July 1926	6 July 1938	11 years, 351 days		
Judge	George Beeby	21 July 1926	31 July 1941	15 years, 10 days		
Judge	Edmund Drake-Brockman	18 April 1927	1 June 1949	22 years, 44 days		
Judge	Harold Piper	15 February 1938	16 June 1947	9 years, 121 days		
Judge	Thomas O'Mara	15 March 1939	14 October 1946	7 years, 213 days		
Judge	Sir Raymond Kelly	15 August 1941	25 July 1956	14 years, 345 days		
Judge	Alfred Foster	12 October 1944	26 November 1962 (Note: Appointed for life and so maintained appointment as a judge even though the Court ceased to sit after 1956. The Court was only abolished after the retirement of its last member, Sir Richard Kirby in 1973.)	18 years, 45 days	Deputy President of the Commonwealth Conciliation and Arbitration Commission	
Judge	Bernard Sugerman	15 April 1946	9 September 1947	1 year, 147 days	Resigned to take up appointment with NSW Supreme Court	
Judge	Sir Richard Kirby	26 August 1947	1973	25–26 years	First President of the Commonwealth Conciliation and Arbitration Commission	
Judge	Edward Dunphy	27 April 1949	15 August 1956	7 years, 110 days	Appointed to the Commonwealth Industrial Court	
Judge	Sydney Wright	14 December 1950	1970	19–20 years	Deputy President of the Commonwealth Conciliation and Arbitration Commission	
Judge	Malcolm McIntyre	4 July 1952	21 September 1953	1 year, 79 days		
Judge	Sir Edward Morgan	4 August 1952	15 August 1956	4 years, 11 days	Appointed to the Commonwealth Industrial Court	
Judge	Richard Ashburner	1 February 1954	1963	8–9 years	Deputy President of the Commonwealth Conciliation and Arbitration Commission	
