= List of judges of the Supreme Court of Christmas Island =

Judges who served on the Supreme Court of Christmas Island are:

Name	Position	From	To	Term	Comments	Notes
Edward Arthur Dunphy	Judge	9 March 1961	31 December 1982	21 years, 297 days	Commonwealth Industrial Court (1956–1982); ACT Supreme Court (1958–1982); Supreme Court of the Cocos (Keeling) Islands (1961–1982); Supreme Court of Norfolk Island (1969–1982); Court of Appeal of Nauru (1967–1982)	
Sir William Forster	Judge	20 September 1979	30 January 1989	9 years, 132 days	NT Supreme Court (1971–1985)	
John Gallop	Additional Judge	20 September 1979	8 May 1989	9 years, 230 days	ACT Supreme Court (1982–2000)	
John Gallop	Judge	9 May 1989	30 July 2000	11 years, 82 days	ACT Supreme Court (1982–2000)	
Robert French	Additional Judge	9 May 1989	15 November 2000	11 years, 190 days		
