= Federal Court of Bankruptcy =

Australian court established in 1930

The Federal Court of Bankruptcy was an Australian court that was established in 1930, pursuant to Chapter III of the Constitution. The jurisdiction in bankruptcy was shared with state courts. On 1 February 1977 the bankruptcy jurisdiction was transferred to the newly established Federal Court of Australia. No new cases could commence in the Federal Court of Bankruptcy after 1 February 1977, (Note: Bankruptcy Amendment Act 1976 (Cth) s 7 Transfer of certain jurisdiction. Commenced 1 February 1977.) however the Court was not formally abolished until 1995, after the last judge, Charles Sweeney retired.

== History ==
Section 51 of the Constitution states:

The Parliament shall, subject to this Constitution, have power to make laws for the peace, order, and good government of the Commonwealth with respect to:

(xvii) bankruptcy and insolvency;

The first Commonwealth Bankruptcy Act was not passed until 1924. The bankruptcy jurisdiction was exercised by state courts. In proposing the establishment of the Federal Court of Bankruptcy, the Attorney-General, Frank Brennan, said that it was necessary because the number of bankruptcy cases had been increasing due to the Great Depression and the 1929 decision of the High Court, which held that the arrangement in relation to registrars in bankruptcy was invalid. The federal court would have one judge and it was anticipated that judge would sit primarily in Sydney and Melbourne as they were the courts with the highest case load.

When the court was established it was constituted by a single judge, Lionel Lukin. When he was ill the Chief Judge of the Commonwealth Court of Conciliation and Arbitration, George Dethridge, was appointed to the court to deal with any urgent matters. The court remained constituted by a single judge until 1973 when a second judge was appointed. The court rarely sat outside of Sydney and Melbourne. Any appeal was directly to the High Court.

The establishment of a Federal Court was proposed in 1967, however it was not until 1977 that the Federal Court was established, incorporating the jurisdiction of the Commonwealth Industrial Court and the Federal Bankruptcy Court. Both judges of the Federal Bankruptcy Court were appointed to the new Federal Court. The Federal Bankruptcy Court, despite having no jurisdiction or cases, continued in existence until the last judge had retired in 1995.

== List of judges ==
Position	Name	From	To	Term	Comments	Notes
Judge	Lionel Lukin	6 August 1930	31 October 1943	13 years, 86 days	Formerly a judge of the Supreme Court (Qld), judge of the Commonwealth Court of Conciliation and Arbitration. Subsequently a judge of the Supreme Court (ACT)	
Judge	George Dethridge	12 July 1935	29 December 1938	3 years, 170 days	Chief Judge of the Commonwealth Court of Conciliation and Arbitration	
Judge	Sir Thomas Clyne	11 July 1942	12 April 1967	24 years, 275 days	Formerly a judge of the County Court of Victoria (1939-1942); Subsequently a judge of the Supreme Court (ACT) (1943-1945)	
Judge	Harry Gibbs	26 June 1967	3 August 1970	3 years, 38 days	Judge of the Supreme Court (Qld) (1961–67) judge of the Supreme Court (ACT) (1967–70); Appointed to the High Court (1970–87)	
Judge	Charles Sweeney CBE	22 October 1970	29 June 1995	24 years, 250 days	Judge of the Commonwealth Industrial Court, Supreme Court (ACT) and Supreme Court (NT). Subsequently appointed to the Federal Court	
Judge	Bernard Riley	22 October 1973	4 August 1978	4 years, 286 days	Appointed to the Federal Court	
