= Richard Blackburn =

Australian judge

The Honourable Sir Richard Blackburn OBE
- A photograph of Sir Richard Blackburn

Personal details
- Born: 26 July 1918 Mount Lofty, South Australia
- Died: 1 October 1987 (aged 69)
- Spouse: Bryony Helen Blackburn
- Children: 2
- Parent: Arthur Seaforth Blackburn
- Education: St Peter's College, Adelaide
- Alma mater: University of Adelaide; University of Oxford
- Civilian awards: Knight Bachelor

Military service
- Allegiance: Australia
- Branch/service: Second Australian Imperial Force; Citizens Military Force
- Years of service: 1940–1945; 1957–1965
- Rank: Colonel
- Unit: 1st Battalion, Royal South Australia Regiment; Adelaide University Regiment
- Battles/wars: Second World War
- Military awards: Officer of the Order of the British Empire
- Service number: SX2747

Sir Richard Arthur Blackburn OBE (26 July 1918 – 1 October 1987) was an Australian judge, prominent legal academic and military officer. He became a judge of three courts in Australia, and eventually became chief justice of the Australian Capital Territory. In the 1970s he decided one of Australia's earliest Aboriginal Land rights cases. The annual Sir Richard Blackburn Memorial lectures in Canberra commemorate his service to the Australian legal community.

== Early years ==
Blackburn was born on 26 July 1918 in Mount Lofty, South Australia. He was the son of Brigadier Arthur Blackburn VC and Rose Ada Blackburn (née Kelly). His father was at that time a prominent legal practitioner in South Australia, and was later to serve as a Commissioner of the now defunct Commonwealth Court of Conciliation and Arbitration. Blackburn was educated at St Peter's College, Adelaide and was an undergraduate at St Mark's College at the University of Adelaide. He graduated with First Class Honours in English Literature from the University of Adelaide. He won the John Howard Clark Prize as the candidate who was placed highest in the final examination. He was chosen as the Rhodes Scholar for South Australia in 1940, but did not take it up immediately because of the outbreak of the Second World War.

On 14 May 1940, during the Second World War, Blackburn enlisted in the Australian Army at Adelaide. He served with the Second Australian Imperial Force (2nd AIF) on active service in North Africa and Papua New Guinea until his discharge on 7 November 1945 as a captain in the 2/9th Division Cavalry Regiment.

== Legal and academic life ==
At the end of the war, he took up his Rhodes Scholarship at Magdalen College, University of Oxford. He and another South Australian, the Honourable Justice Andrew Wells, became the first Dominion students to be awarded the Eldon Law Scholarship. As a result, he attended the University of Oxford in 1949 and graduated with a Bachelor of Civil Law. Blackburn was called to the Bar in the United Kingdom in Inner Temple in 1949.

Blackburn returned to Australia after his Oxford studies. He was admitted as a legal practitioner in South Australia in 1951. Between 1950 and 1957 he was the Bonython Professor of Law at the Adelaide University. He married his wife Bryony Helen Dutton Curkeet, the daughter of the late Henry Hampden Dutton and Emily Martin Dutton of Anlaby, Kapunda, South Australia, on 1 December 1951 at her brother's home at Anlaby. He became the Dean of the Faculty of Law in 1951 and served as Dean there until 1957. In 1957 he left full-time academic life to become a partner in the Adelaide law firm Finlaysons; however, he continued as a member of the Faculty until 1965. His daughter and son were born while he was teaching at the Adelaide University.

In 1957 he was commissioned as a lieutenant colonel and given command of the Adelaide University Regiment. In 1962 he was commissioned as a colonel and given command of the 1st Battalion, Royal South Australia Regiment. He served there until 1965. Blackburn was appointed an Officer of the Order of the British Empire (OBE) on 1 January 1965 in honour of his military service.

== Judicial career ==
Richard Blackburn left academic life and was appointed a judge of the Supreme Court of the Northern Territory in 1966. During this time, he became President of the Arts Council of the Northern Territory. It was during his judicial life in the Northern Territory that he decided the first significant case concerning Aboriginal Land Rights in Australia. This was the case of Milirrpum v. Nabalco in which important issues of aboriginal land rights were canvassed. In that case he held that the communal system in which Australian Aborigines had lived could be called a “government of law, and not of men”, accepting that was a system of law predating British settlement. However, he ruled that the British common law did not recognise communal interests and in any event, those interests were extinguished by the assertion of British sovereignty over the land in question. The case led to the eventual introduction of the Aboriginal Land Rights Act 1976.

In May 1971 he was appointed as a judge of the Supreme Court of the Australian Capital Territory. In that same year, he was also appointed a judge of the Federal Court of Australia in 1977 on that court's establishment and served as a judge in that latter court until 1984. He was appointed chief judge of Supreme Court on 7 November 1977. He was appointed chief justice on 7 May 1982 when that position replaced the former position of chief judge.

He was the chairperson of the Law Reform Commission of the Australian Capital Territory from 1971 to 1976. In 1979, Blackburn authored a biographical entry in the Australian Dictionary of Biography about his father. In keeping with Blackburn's nature of not seeking honours, he failed to note in the entry that he had himself gone on to become a distinguished judge.

He was Patron of the St John Council for Australian Capital Territory from 1981 to 1984. In 1981, he became a Commander of the Order of St John of Jerusalem in honour of his service.

He was knighted in the New Years Honours of 1983 for his services to the law. He became Chancellor of the Australian National University in 1984.

== Retirement ==
Blackburn retired as Chief Justice due to ill health on 31 March 1985. At his retirement ceremony, Faulks J, speaking on behalf of the legal profession said:

Amongst the lessons we have learned from you, Chief Justice, is the importance of humanity and understanding in the practise of the law. These qualities have been demonstrated again and again during your time on the Bench. .... Your Honour has also shown us that excellence in knowledge and even in ability is nothing without true humanity and concern for others. Your Honour has shown in word and in example that humility and an appreciation of the other's point of view are the hallmarks of a good lawyer, whether he be judge, solicitor or barrister.

In 1986 he was elected an Honorary Fellow of St Mark's College. Blackburn was also invited to give the first Harrison Memorial Lecture at the Royal Military College at Duntroon after the Officer Training School was moved from Portsea.

In May of that year, Blackburn was one of three former chief justices appointed by the Australian Government to be Parliamentary Commissioners in a Special Commission of Inquiry to investigate the conduct of Justice Lionel Murphy concerning allegations that Murphy had attempted to pervert the course of justice in the criminal proceeding involving solicitor Morgan Ryan. He was appointed notwithstanding his ill-health because of his skills and abilities. While the inquiry did not proceed to conclusion because of Murphy's own illness and subsequent death, the commissioners did make a report on what constituted misconduct for a judge under the Australian Constitution. Blackburn concluded:

'[P]roved misbehaviour' means such misconduct, whether criminal or not, and whether or not displayed in the actual exercise of judicial functions, as, being morally wrong, demonstrates the unfitness for office of the judge in question."

Blackburn died on 1 October 1987. He was survived by his wife Bryony Helen Blackburn, who died in 2005, and children Charlotte Calder and Tom Blackburn SC.

== Sir Richard Blackburn Lectures ==
In 1986, the Law Society of the Australian Capital Territory inaugurated the Sir Richard Blackburn Lecture in honour of Blackburn's services to the legal community. Blackburn himself gave the first lecture. Michael Black, former Chief Justice of the Federal Court of Australia, is the only person to have given the lecture twice, in 1994 and 2012, although the latter lecture made no reference to having done so previously.

- 1986 – Sir Richard Blackburn, Chief Justice of the Supreme Court of the Australian Capital Territory: The Courts and the Community.
- 1987 – Sir Harry Gibbs, Chief Justice of the High Court of Australia: The Powers of the Police to Question and Search.
- 1988 – Michael Kirby, President of the Court of Appeal of New South Wales: The Politics of Law Reform.
- 1989 – Sir Anthony Mason, Chief Justice of the High Court of Australia: Administrative Review – the Experience of the First Twelve Years.
- 1990 – Sir Gerard Brennan, Justice of the High Court of Australia: Courts, Democracy and the Law.
- 1991 – Sir Zelman Cowen, former Governor-General of Australia: Crown and Representative in the Commonwealth.
- 1992 – Mary Gaudron, Justice of the High Court of Australia: Equal Rights and Anti-Discrimination Law.
- 1993 – Jeffrey Miles, Chief Justice of the Supreme Court of the Australian Capital Territory: The State of the Judicature in the ACT.
- 1994 – Michael Black, Chief Justice of the Federal Court of Australia: Letting the Public Know – The Educative Role of the Courts.
- 1995 – Dame Roma Mitchell, Governor of South Australia: The External Affairs Power in relation to United Nations Conventions; its effect upon the Balance of Power between Commonwealth and States.
- 1996 – Paul Finn, Judge of the Federal Court of Australia: The Courts and the Vulnerable.
- 1997 – Deirdre O'Connor, President of the Australian Industrial Relations Commission: Access to Justice – Technicalities and the Tribunal System.
- 1998 – Robert French, Judge of the Federal Court of Australia: (Note: The Law Society of the ACT’s list of Blackburn lecturers describes French as the Chief Justice of the High Court of Australia, which he subsequently was, from 2008 to 2017, but in 1998 he was a Judge of the Federal Court.) Courts Under the Constitution.
- 1999 – John Lehane, Judge of the Federal Court of Australia: Administrative Law – Aspects of Pre-Millennial Judicial Review.
- 2000 – John Gallop, Supreme Court of the Australian Capital Territory and the List of judges of the Federal Court of Australia: (Note: The Law Society of the ACT’s list of Blackburn lecturers describes Gallop as a Judge of the Federal Court, which he was, but omits his primary commission, which was as a Judge of the Supreme Court of the ACT.) The Attorney-General – A Hybrid Character Who Needs to be Versatile.
- 2001 – Bettie McNee, President of the Administrative Review Council: Administrative Review – Observations and Reflections.
- 2002 – Alastair Nicholson, Chief Justice of the Family Court of Australia: Children and Young People – The Law and Human Rights.
- 2003 – Diana Bryant, Chief Federal Magistrate of Australia: The Contribution of Children to the Jurisprudence of the Federal Magistrates Court and the Relevance of the 'Best Interests of the Child' principle in the Legal Work of the Federal Magistrates Court.
- 2004 – John Doyle, Chief Justice of the Supreme Court of South Australia: Investing in the Judiciary.
- 2005 – Stephen Kenny, former lawyer for David Hicks, a Guantanamo Bay detainee: Hicks and the Geneva Convention, Hindmarsh and Native Title.
- 2006 – Terence Higgins, Chief Justice of the Supreme Court of the Australian Capital Territory: Women in Law – Past Achievements and Future Directions.
- 2007 – Murray Wilcox, Judge of the Federal Court of Australia: The Rule of Law – Looking behind the icon. It was in this lecture that Wilcox described Australia as becoming an 'elected dictatorship' under the Howard government.
- 2008 – Ken Crispin, former Judge of the Supreme Court of the Australian Capital Territory: (Note: The Law Society of the ACT’s list of Blackburn lecturers describes Crispin as a Judge of the ACT Supreme Court, but he retired in 2007 – see List of judges of the Supreme Court of the Australian Capital Territory.) Law and Liberty.
- 2009 – Lex Lasry, Judge of the Supreme Court of Victoria: Unelected Judges – Out of touch with the Community?
- 2010 – Julian Burnside, human rights and refugee advocate: Injustice within the law – an update.
- 2011 – Virginia Bell, Justice of the High Court of Australia: Sentencing and judicial discretion.
- 2012 – Michael Black, former Chief Justice of the Federal Court of Australia: The Courts and the Community.
- 2013 – Lt Col Michael (Dan) Mori, former US Military Judge: Reflections on the War on Terror.
- 2014 – Susan Kiefel, Justice of the High Court of Australia: The Individual Judge.
- 2015 – George Williams, Professor of Law at the University of New South Wales: The Legal Assault on Australian Democracy.
- 2016 – John Faulks, Deputy Chief Justice of the Family Court of Australia: Brave New World.
- 2017 – Justin Gleeson, former Solicitor-General of the Commonwealth of Australia: Law, Morality and the Public Trust.
- 2018 – John Pascoe, Chief Justice of the Family Court of Australia: Sleepwalking through the minefield: commercial surrogacy and the global response.
- 2019 – Karen Fryar, former Magistrate of the Australian Capital Territory: Pro bono: For whose benefit?
- 2020 – No lecture

== Published papers ==
- “Law School Curricula in Retrospect” 9 Adelaide Law Review 43 (1983–1985)

== Sources ==
- Hughes, Tom. "Sir Harry Gibbs: An Advocate's Perspective".
- "History page". Supreme Court of the Northern Territory.

Academic offices
Preceded by Sir John Crawford	Chancellor of the Australian National University; 1984–1987	Succeeded by Sir Gordon Jackson
