= Justin Hanson =

Australian politician (born 1980)

The Honourable Justin Hanson MLC
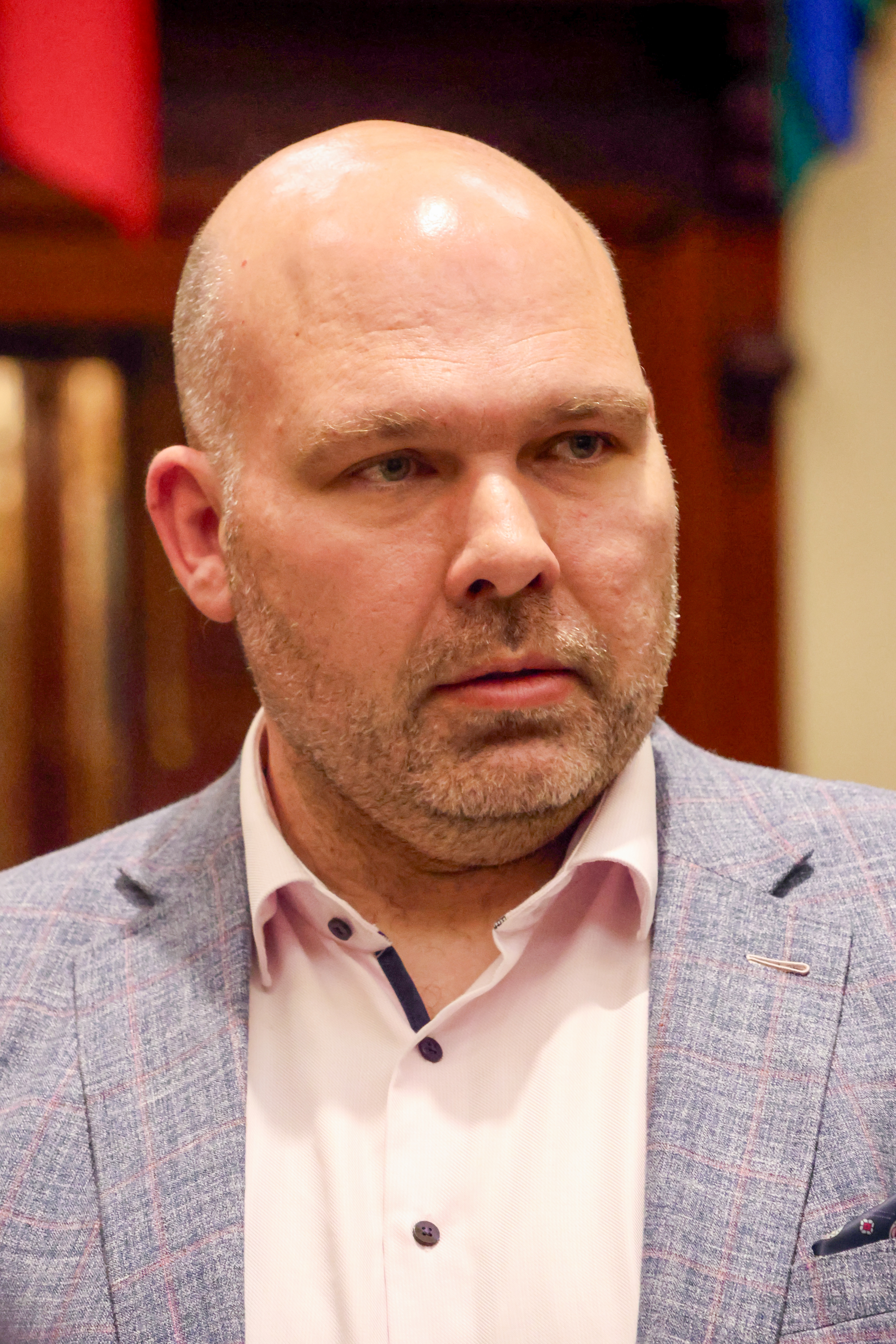
- Hanson in 2025

Member of the South Australian Legislative Council
- Incumbent
- Assumed office 28 February 2017
- Preceded by: Gerry Kandelaars

Personal details
- Born: Justin Eric Hanson; 21 October 1980 (age 46) Adelaide, South Australia, Australia
- Party: Labor (2017–present)
- Education: University of Adelaide (BA; LLB)
- Occupation: Lawyer
- Website: www.justinhanson.com.au

Justin Eric Hanson (born 21 October 1980) is an Australian politician who was appointed to the South Australian Legislative Council for the South Australian Branch of the Australian Labor Party on 28 February 2017.

== Early life and education ==
Hanson was born on 21 October 1980, and raised in Adelaide's western suburbs. His parents were both born in Broken Hill, where his grandfathers worked in the mines. His father, Wayne Hanson, later became a toolmaker and prominent trade union leader with the Australian Workers' Union (AWU), and his mother worked in both retail and early childhood education. Hanson completed a Bachelor of Laws at the University of Adelaide in 2006.

== Early career ==
Hanson served as an elected member of the City of Tea Tree Gully council, where he gained experience in governance and community services. He was also a director of the Statewide Superannuation Trust, which manages retirement funds for South Australians. In addition, he worked with the AWU in South Australia, representing employees in industries such as manufacturing, food production, cement, energy and mining.

== Political career ==
=== Weatherill government (2017–2018) ===
Hanson entered state politics in February 2017 when he was elected to the South Australian Legislative Council to fill the vacancy created by the resignation of Gerry Kandelaars. His anticipated appointment, arranged through a factional deal within the Australian Labor Party (ALP), was contested by several left-wing industrial unions that instead supported Maritime Union secretary Jamie Newlyn, reflecting divisions within the Labor Left faction. The arrangement also included negotiations over preselection for the seat of Florey, where Hanson was expected to stand, though this became complicated when incumbent MP Frances Bedford announced she would re-contest the seat. Hanson was formally welcomed to the Legislative Council by Kyam Maher on 28 February 2017, following his election by a joint sitting of both houses of parliament.

=== Marshall government (2018–2022) ===
Hanson was placed second on the ALP ticket for the 2018 South Australian state election, which was conducted under a new electoral system that abolished group voting tickets and allowed voters to express preferences above the line, reducing party control over preference flows. Labor received 304,229 votes for the Legislative Council, and Hanson was re-elected, finishing fifth overall among eleven members elected from a field of 43 candidates. Following his election, he was appointed to several parliamentary committees: the Statutory Authorities Review Committee on 3 May; the Crime and Public Integrity Policy Committee on 8 May; and the Budget and Finance Committee from 9 May. On 21 May, he addressed the Legislative Council to oppose the Marshall government's proposed council rate-capping, citing potential impacts on regional investment, employment, and local government administration, and reportedly lobbied ALP colleagues to oppose the measure in line with union concerns. He subsequently joined the SA Pathology and SA Medical Imaging Committee on 29 November and, on 13 November 2019, became a member of the committee reviewing the effectiveness of the current system of parliamentary committees.

=== Malinauskas government (2022–present) ===
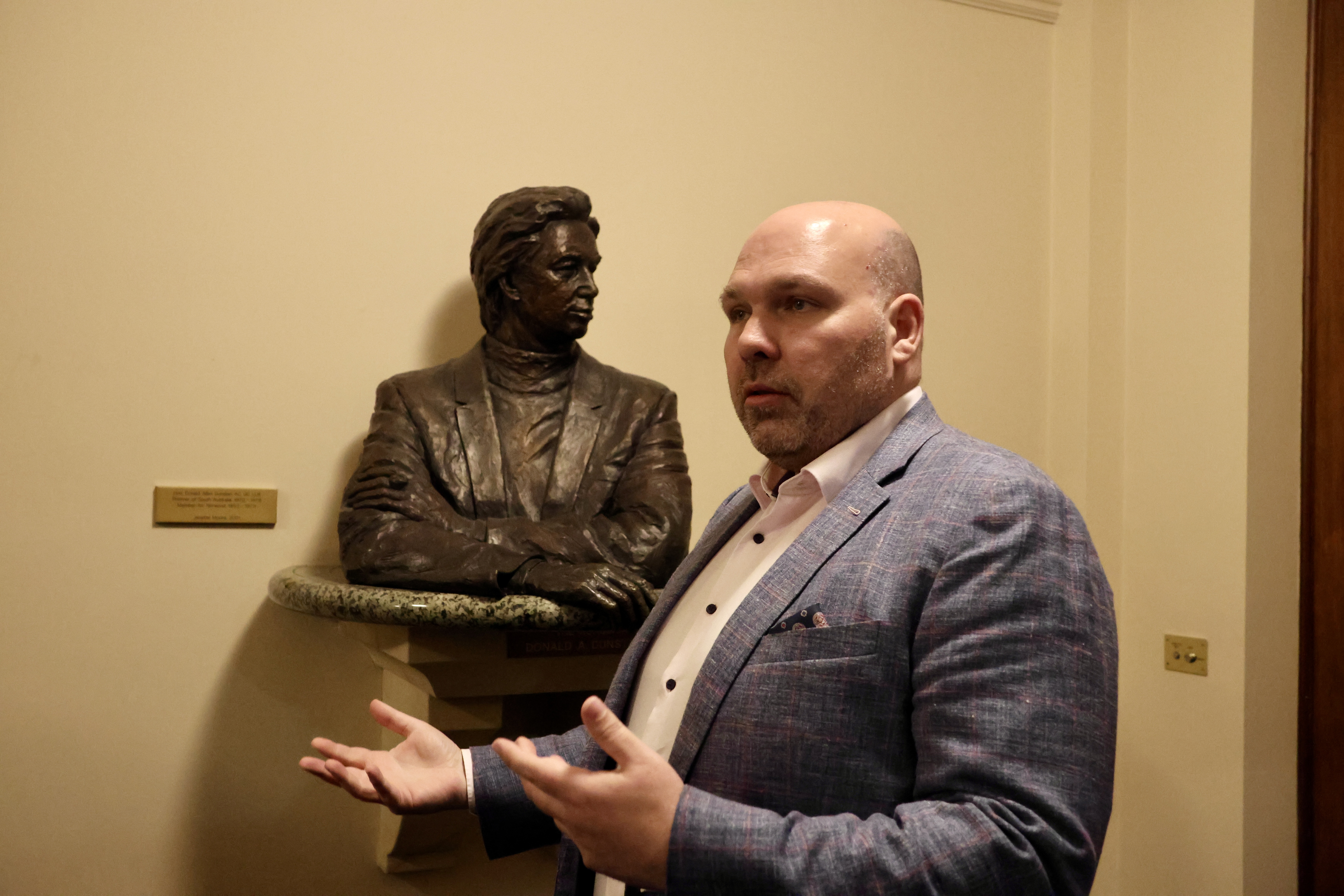
Hanson standing in front of a bust of Don Dunstan while giving a tour inside Parliament House, Adelaide, 2025

In March 2021, Hanson joined the Labor Unity faction within the ALP, amid broader factional shifts including the defection of the Australian Manufacturing Workers Union to the Left. His alignment with Labor Unity was seen as a strategic measure to maintain the Labor Right faction's influence within state party politics. In May 2022, during the first sitting of the Malinauskas ministry, Hanson was nominated, along with several other Labor MLCs, for the position of President of the South Australian Legislative Council but declined, enabling Terry Stephens to be re-elected unopposed with the support of Labor and the Greens. Later that year, in October, Hanson publicly criticised The Advertiser over its front-page headline "The Rape Divide", describing it as inappropriate and indicative of broader societal misogyny, and called for greater accountability in media reporting of sexual violence. In November, Hanson restricted Independent Commissioner Against Corruption Ann Vanstone from commenting on her agency's investigation into former Renewal SA chief John Hanlon, limiting her evidence to matters within the committee’s terms of reference while indicating she could raise her concerns at a later date.

In March 2023, Hanson participated in a parliamentary roundtable with Nick Champion and union representatives to address South Australia's regional housing crisis, supporting the Office for Regional Housing's Key Worker Housing Scheme, a pilot program delivering homes across multiple regional areas with potential for expansion. During the October 2024 debate on a private members bill to amend South Australia's abortion laws, Hanson voted against the legislation introduced by Ben Hood, which sought to alter provisions on late-term terminations established in 2021. Hanson was among seven Labor members, together with Greens and SA Best MLCs, whose opposition contributed to the bill's defeat in the Upper House by a single vote.

== Personal life ==
Hanson lives in Modbury with his wife, Alex, and their son. He is a fan of the Adelaide Football Club.
