= Behrooz v Secretary of the Department of Immigration and Multicultural and Indigenous Affairs =

Judgement of the High Court of Australia

- Court: High Court of Australia
- Decided: 6 August 2004
- Citations: [2004] HCA 36, (2004) 219 CLR 486
- Transcripts: 12 Nov [2003] HCATrans 456; 13 Nov [2003] HCATrans 458

Case history
- Prior actions: [2002] SASC 370; [2003] SASC 7, (2003) 84 SASR 479, Full Court
- Appealed from: Supreme Court (SA)

Case opinions
- Harsh conditions of immigration detention do not render the detention unlawful
- Majority: Gleeson CJ, McHugh, Gummow, Hayne, Callinan & Heydon JJ
- Dissent: Kirby J

Behrooz v Secretary of the Department of Immigration and Multicultural and Indigenous Affairs, is a decision of the High Court of Australia regarding the detention of asylum seekers in Australia. A 6-1 majority of the Court (Justice Michael Kirby dissenting) held that even if the conditions of immigration detention are harsh, such conditions do not render the detention unlawful.

== Background ==
=== Facts ===
Maharani Behrooz, an Iranian national, was being held in the Woomera Detention Centre pending determination of his application for refugee status. In November 2001, Behrooz was one of six men that escaped the detention centre. Following his capture, he was charged with escaping detention along with two of the other men. Their defence at the criminal trial was that conditions at the centre were so harsh that they were punitive, thus making the detention unlawful and the escape lawful.

=== Prior actions ===
To support the claim that the detention was harsh and therefore unlawful, the defendants applied for summonses to be issued to obtain a large amount of documentary material that would evidence the conditions at the centre. In January 2002, the Port Augusta Magistrates Court issued summonses to produce documents to the Department of Immigration and Multicultural and Indigenous Affairs, Australasian Correctional Management Pty Ltd and Australasian Correctional Services Pty Ltd, the two companies responsible for running the detention centre. The Department and the companies applied to the Magistrates Court for the summonses to be set aside. The Commonwealth Attorney-General intervened in the application and argued that producing all of the material sought was "oppressive", and that the summons was an abuse of process as the documents sought could not help establish a defence to the charge of escape. The magistrate rejected the Attorney-General's argument and refused to set aside the summonses, but narrowed their scope to the period in which at least one of the defendants was detained at the centre.

The Department appealed to the Supreme Court where Gray J upheld the appeal on the grounds that "7. ... The defendants' complaint raises allegations about the conditions of their lawful detention. Those complaints cannot as a matter of law make the detention unlawful. The defendants do not seek relevant material". The summonses were therefore set aside.

The Full Court of the Supreme Court of South Australia (Lander and Besanko JJ, Bleby J dissenting), refused leave to appeal.

By the time the case was heard by the High Court, 2 of the 3 defendants had been deported and charges against the third were dropped.

== Judgment ==
The High Court held, by a 6:1 majority, that even if Mr Behrooz could show that the conditions of his detention were harsh, he had no right to escape from Woomera. The information from the documents may assist Mr Behrooz to seek legal redress for any wrongs against him however that did not assist with the criminal charges pending against him. The summonses lacked a legitimate forensic purpose and were therefore properly set aside by the Supreme Court.

== Aftermath ==
In July 2004, Mr Behrooz was released into a community detention arrangement to minimise the risk of suicide that would arise if he returned to a detention centre. He subsequently pleaded guilty to escaping from immigration detention. The magistrate discharged him without conviction upon Mr Behrooz entering into a good behaviour bond for 2 years in the sum of $100. The Crown appealed against the sentence. Gray J held that the magistrate had erred in the process of sentencing Mr Behrooz, however in re-sentencing Mr Behrooz found that the sentence was appropriate.

In February 2012 Mr Behrooz commenced proceedings in NSW seeking damages for the psychological harm he claims to have suffered as a result of his detention and those proceedings had not been resolved by April 2015.
