= Court of Petty Sessions =

Court of Petty Sessions may refer to:

- A formerly used name by the Local Court of New South Wales
- A name formerly used by the Magistrates' Court of South Australia
- A name formerly used by the Magistrates Court of the Australian Capital Territory
- Norfolk Island Court of Petty Sessions
- A name formerly used by the District Court (Ireland)
- A name formerly used by the Magistrates Courts of Queensland
- Other jurisdictions found in Judiciary of Australia#State and territory courts and tribunals

== See also ==
- Petty session
