= Helen Murrell =

Australian Chief Justice

The Honourable Helen Murrell SC

5th Chief Justice of the Australian Capital Territory
- In office 28 October 2013 – 4 March 2022
- Appointed by: Simon Corbell
- Preceded by: Terrence Higgins
- Succeeded by: Lucy McCallum

Judge of the District Court of NSW
- In office 13 September 1996 – 28 October 2013

Senior Judge of the Drug Court of New South Wales
- In office 1998–2003

Acting Judge of the Land and Environment Court of New South Wales
- In office 1996–1996

President of the Equal Opportunity Tribunal of New South Wales
- In office 1997–1999

Deputy President of the Administrative Decisions Tribunal of New South Wales
- In office 1997–1999

Deputy Chairperson of the New South Wales Medical Tribunal
- In office 2005–2013

Personal details
- Born: Helen Gay Murrell
- Education: University of New South Wales; University of Sydney
- Occupation: Lawyer; Jurist

Helen Gay Murrell SC is an Australian lawyer and judge who was the Chief Justice of the Supreme Court of the Australian Capital Territory.

She is the first woman to be appointed Chief Justice.

== Early life ==
Murrell grew up in Seaforth, New South Wales.

She then studied at the University of New South Wales and graduated in 1976 with a Bachelor of Arts and a Bachelor of Laws.

== Career ==
Murrell was admitted to practise in 1977.

She first worked at the Commonwealth Crown Solicitor's Office and then at Legal Aid NSW.

In 1981, Murrell was called to the bar and was appointed senior counsel in 1995. She also attended the University of Sydney and graduated with a Diploma of Criminology.

In 1996, she was appointed a Judge of the District Court of New South Wales. She was also an Acting Judge in the Land and Environment Court of New South Wales during this year.

She served as President of the NSW Equal Opportunity Tribunal and as Deputy President of the Administrative Decisions Tribunal of New South Wales from 1997 to 1999.

In 1998, Murell was involved in establishing the Drug Court of New South Wales. She was the first Senior Judge of that court and served until 2003.

In 2005, she was appointed the Deputy Chairperson of the New South Wales Medical Tribunal.

On 12 September 2013, Attorney-General Simon Corbell announced the appointment of Murrell to replace the retiring Chief Justice Terence Higgins.

Murrell was sworn in as the Chief Justice of the Australian Capital Territory on 28 October 2013 and is the first woman to have been appointed to that role.

She currently also serves on the committee of the National Judicial College of Australia.

Murrell retired as Chief Justice in March 2022. She has served as a part-time commissioner of the New South Wales Independent Commission Against Corruption since August 2022.
