= Jeffrey Miles =

Australian author and jurist (1935–2019)

The Honourable Jeffrey Miles AO

3rd Chief Justice of the Australian Capital Territory
- In office 17 June 1985 – 30 September 2002
- Preceded by: Sir Richard Blackburn
- Succeeded by: Terrence Higgins

Personal details
- Born: Jeffrey Allan Miles; 20 March 1935 Newcastle, New South Wales
- Died: 11 February 2019 (aged 83)
- Spouse: Patricia Miles
- Children: 2 (m, f)
- Education: Newcastle Boys High School, New South Wales
- Alma mater: The University of Sydney
- Profession: Judge, jurist & barrister

Jeffrey Allan Miles AO (20 March 1935 – 11 February 2019) was an Australian author and jurist. He was a Chief Justice of the Australian Capital Territory. He also held judicial appointments in New South Wales and Papua New Guinea. In 2005 he conducted a judicial review into the fitness to be tried of David Eastman who had been convicted of murdering Australian policeman Colin Winchester. In 2008, he was elected President of the Australian Capital Territory Branch of the International Commission of Jurists.

== Early years ==
Jeffrey Allan Miles was born 20 March 1935 in Newcastle, New South Wales, the son of James Albert Miles and Dora Jessie Miles.

He attended Newcastle Boys High School and matriculated to the University of Sydney; where he graduated with a Bachelor of Arts in 1955, a Bachelor of Laws in 1958, and a Master of Laws in 1973.

== Career ==
In 1958 he was admitted as a solicitor of the Supreme Court of New South Wales and practised until 1965. In 1965 he was admitted to the bar in both New South Wales and the Northern Territory. In 1978 he was appointed a Public Defender in New South Wales. Miles continued to practise as a barrister until 1980 when he was appointed to the judiciary.

In 1980 he was appointed judge to the National Court of Papua New Guinea. He worked as a judge there until 1982. In that year, he was appointed to the Supreme Court of New South Wales.

In 1985 he was appointed Chief Justice of the Australian Capital Territory. He was appointed concurrently to the Federal Court of Australia. He continued as a judge in both the Federal Court and the Supreme Court of the Australian Capital Territory until his early retirement in 2002.

Following his retirement, Miles continued his work in the law, being appointed both an acting judge in the Supreme Courts of both New South Wales and in the Australian Capital Territory – appointments he held until 2005. In 2005, he agreed to sit on the Law Council of Australia's Human Rights Observer Panel. He also chaired the Torres Strait Fisheries Assessment Advisory Panel in 2006 and 2007.

== Notable cases ==
Justice Miles dealt with many interesting cases during his career. An often cited and legally significant case is that of R v Hollingshed. This case involved the interpretation of Australia's obligations under an international treaty when it had not been applied by law into Australia as affecting the treatment of a prisoner. He embarked on a full and frank discussion of the New South Wales prison system. Whilst he held that the treaty could be used to interpret the criminal law, he declined to hold that being held in “isolated protective custody” was unlawful under international obligations.

Miles dealt with a claim for compensation for injuries suffered by a female complainant slipping on the floor at a supermarket. The complainant, aged 58, alleged that she had been deprived from potentially earning an income as a prostitute at a brothel. The complainant produced a number of young men who were prepared to testify that they were disappointed that the complainant had not been available as a prostitute. Miles declined to award any damages.

Miles led an inquiry into the fitness to be tried of David Harold Eastman. Eastman had been sentenced to life imprisonment for the shooting of Colin Winchester, an Assistant Commissioner of Police, outside his Canberra home in 1989. Eastman had earlier lost appeals to the Federal Court and the High Court of Australia from his conviction. After hearing evidence at the inquiry for over two years, Miles presented his report to the Australian Capital Territory Government. He concluded that Eastman was fit to plead to the indictment.

== Awards and honours ==
On 10 June 1994, he was made an Officer in the General Division of the Order of Australia for "service to the law and the community".

In 2003, he was awarded the Centenary Medal.

== Personal life ==
On 15 April 1976 he married Patricia, daughter of Noel and Doreen Freebairn. They had one son and one daughter.

Miles died on 11 February 2019.

== Publications ==
- "Bail Legislation: Objectives and Achievements";
- "The role of the victim in the criminal process: fairness to the victim and fairness to the accused";
- "The Role of Judicature in the Australian Capital Territory";
- "The Judicature in the Australian Capital Territory";
- "Justice at the Seat of Government".
