= Edward Dunphy =

Edward Dunphy may refer to:

- Edward Arthur Dunphy (1907–1989), Australian barrister and judge
- Edward J. Dunphy (1856–1926), American politician
