= Terence Higgins =

Terence or Terrence Higgins may refer to:

- Terence Higgins, Baron Higgins (1928–2025), British politician, MP and Olympian
- Terence Higgins (judge) (born 1943), Chief Justice of the Australian Capital Territory
- Terry Higgins (1945–1982), Welsh early AIDS death
