= 1929 Australian timber workers' strike =

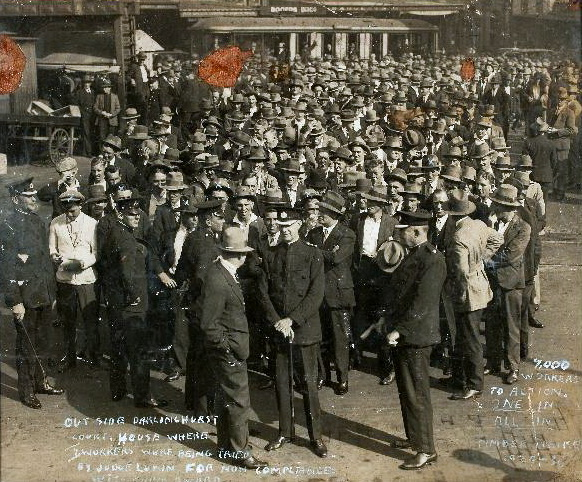
Outside Darlinghurst Court House where several timber workers were being tried by Judge Lukin for non-compliance with the Award; 7000 workers attended

The 1929 Timber Workers strike was a labour dispute in Australia caused by Justice Lukin of the Arbitration Court handing down an industrial award decision on 23 December 1928 to reduce the wages and increase the hours for 20,000 timber workers from a 44-hour week to a 48-hour week. It was the first strike in Australia after the onset of the Great Depression.

An initial response by workers at mass meetings on 3 January in Melbourne, Sydney, and Adelaide was to refuse to work the four hours extra stipulated by the Lukin award. This then precipitated the employers applying to the court that a strike existed. The penalties of the Arbitration Amendment Act, enacted in 1928, were then invoked. The urban nature of timber mills meant that industrial action was concentrated around the working-class areas of the affected cities, notably Glebe in Sydney. The dispute widened with carters and crane drivers striking in solidarity. A special conference of the Australian Council of Trade Unions (ACTU) on 7 February 1929 agreed to extend the strike to a general movement; to boycott the Federal Industrial Court; and for the conduct of the strike to be managed by the ACTU Disputes Committee.

On 25 February, Justice Lukin ordered a secret ballot of the timber workers in Victoria and New South Wales. This was the first attempt to enforce a secret ballot in an industrial dispute. On 1 March Lukin imposed a fine of £1000 on the Timber Workers Union, followed by a fine of £50 on Jack Holloway, Secretary of Melbourne Trades Hall Council. A protest meeting outside the Sydney Trades Hall on 25 March was attended by 25,000 trade unionists. At this meeting 3000 strikers publicly burnt their ballot papers. The crowd then marched to Hyde Park where an effigy of Justice Lukin was burnt.

The secret ballot was largely boycotted by the workers. When the votes that were cast were counted they were 5000 to 7000 against acceptance of the award in New South Wales and Victoria.

Women's involvement in trade unions and their direct participation in industrial action has been the subject of growing interest for labour historians and industrial relations scholars. Some research has also concentrated on women's indirect participation to paid work. However just as this field of investigation has made inroads into the study of labour history, some have advised a return to 'traditional' concerns of institutional labour history. The following article takes up this debate through an investigation of the 1929 strike in the timber industry. It suggests that hitherto unexplored aspects of mobilisation may be more fully appreciated by analysing those closely associated with strikers and their unions. Specifically, it emphasises the role of community and gender relations. Women played a particularly active role in the dispute holding weekly meetings, attending picket lines, and collecting money. Several women were prosecuted and sent to jail for collecting money for the strikers. There was considerable community and union support mobilised for the strikers, which enabled them to survive on strike for so long.

After five months the strike came to an end on 24 June on the basis of a 48-hour week, but with an independent inquiry to be appointed into the financial condition of the industry. At the end of July seven union leaders, including Jock Garden, the Secretary of the Trades and Labor Council; John Culbert, the Secretary of the Timber Workers Union; and the Chairman of the ACTU Disputes Committee were charged with "unlawful conspiracy by violence and threats of violence" to prevent timber workers from working. A jury subsequently acquitted all those charged.
