= Supreme Court of Norfolk Island =

Superior court for the Australian territory of Norfolk Island

- Established: 30 May 1957
- Jurisdiction: Norfolk Island; Coral Sea Islands
- Location: Kingston
- Appeals to: Federal Court of Australia (Full Court)
- Appeals from: Norfolk Island Court of Petty Sessions
- Judge term length: Mandatory retirement by age of 70
- Number of positions: 3

Chief Justice of Norfolk Island
- Currently: Robert Bromwich
- Since: 7 May 2024

The Supreme Court of Norfolk Island is the superior court for the Australian territory of Norfolk Island. It has unlimited jurisdiction within the territory in civil matters and hears the most serious criminal matters. It also has jurisdiction over the Coral Sea Islands Territory. All matters are heard before a single judge, including appeals from the Court of Petty Sessions. In the Australian court hierarchy, it is one of eight state and territory Supreme Courts having unlimited jurisdiction in their respective parts of Australia. Appeal lies to the Federal Court of Australia, from which an appeal by special leave can be made to the High Court of Australia.

== History ==
Prior to 1960 almost all matters were heard by the Chief Magistrate who was also the Administrator. If there was a need for a judge then a person was appointed specifically for that purpose. The first such appointment was Ernest Docker, a judge of the District Court of NSW, who was appointed in 1894 to hear the trial of Anne Christian who had been charged with infanticide. Days before the judge arrived, Thomas Mollett was charged with the attempted murder of his 18-month-old daughter, so both cases were tried. In 1908 Hugh Pollock, a Crown Prosecutor from Sydney, was appointed to hear the trial of J F Young for stealing a copper boiler, a relic of HMS Bounty.

In 1935 Charles Nobbs sued the Administrator, Charles Pinney, for being wrongly removed as the President of the Executive Council in 1934. William Coyle, a judge of the District Court of NSW, was appointed to hear the case.

The first person to have a standing appointment as a judge in Norfolk Island was ACT Supreme Court Judge, William Simpson in 1953. It is unclear whether he ever heard a case in Norfolk Island.

== Establishment ==
The Court was established by the Norfolk Island Act 1957, and was the third territory supreme court created after the Supreme Court of the Northern Territory (1911) and the Supreme Court of the Australian Capital Territory (1934). The jurisdiction of the Court was to be provided by ordinance, and an appeal was to the High Court of Australia. The Supreme Court Ordinance 1960 (NI), provided that the Supreme Court has the same jurisdiction in relation to Norfolk Island as the ACT Supreme Court has in relation to the ACT, which in turn has the same original jurisdiction, civil and criminal, as the Supreme Court of New South Wales had in relation to NSW immediately before 1 January 1911. The practice and procedure of the Court was also that of the ACT Supreme Court.

It was not until 1960 that the first judge was appointed, Sir Richard Eggleston KC, who was a judge of the Commonwealth Industrial Court and an additional judge of the ACT Supreme Court. The first reported case was Newbery v R in 1965. Henry Newberry was convicted of failing to be enrolled to vote in Norfolk Island Council elections. He challenged his conviction before the Supreme Court of Norfolk Island, arguing that in 1857 Norfolk Island had a constitution and a legislature such that the Crown could not abolish the legislature nor place Norfolk Island under the authority of Australia. Eggleston J considered the constitutional history of Norfolk Island, concluding that the Australian Waste Lands Act 1855 (Imp), authorised any form of government, representative or non-representative, and this included placing Norfolk Island under the authority of Australia. The first appeal to the High Court from the Supreme Court of Norfolk Island was in Sanders v Sanders, a proceeding under the Matrimonial Causes Act 1966 (Cth). The Norfolk Island Act 1957, was the subject of minor amendments in 1963, which included that more than one judge could be appointed to the Court.

== Changes from 1979 ==
Changes were introduced by the Norfolk Island Act 1979, which repealed the 1957 Act. The most notable change was that the 1979 Act granted Norfolk Island limited self-government by establishing the Norfolk Island Legislative Assembly. The "Judicial System" is dealt with in Part VII of the 1979 Act, in which section 52 provided that although the 1957 Act was repealed, the Court continued in existence as "the Superior Court of Record of the Territory", for judges to be appointed by the Governor-General, and that other courts and tribunals for the Territory could be established by or under enactment. One of the changes introduced in 1979 was that the Court could sit outside of Norfolk Island, empowering the Governor-General to make regulations:

"(a) making provision for and in relation to sittings of the Supreme Court in a State or in a Territory other than Norfolk Island for the purpose of hearing and determining a matter, otherwise than in the exercise of its criminal jurisdiction, if a Judge is satisfied that the hearing of the matter outside the Territory is not contrary to the interests of justice..."

=== Practice and procedure ===
Under the 1979 Act the jurisdiction, practice and procedure of the Supreme Court shall be as provided under "enactment", a term which includes any "Ordinance continued in force by (the 1979) Act". One such ordinance is the Supreme Court Ordinance 1960, now the Supreme Court Act 1960 (NI), which set out that the practice and procedure of the Court was that of the ACT Supreme Court.

Jurisdiction

The Court deals with matters arising under specific Norfolk Island laws such as Probate and Administration of Deceased estates; serious indictable offences and crimes; Bail on serious offences; and registration of Maintenance Orders made by foreign courts (not Australian Child Support assessments); and exercises federal jurisdiction for those Australian federal laws that are expressed to apply to the Territory of Norfolk Island. Foreign Judgements may be registered in the Supreme Court of Norfolk Island since the Foreign Judgments Act 1991 (Cth) is expressed to apply to all external Territories of Australia (of which Norfolk Island is one).

In a practical sense its civil and commercial jurisdiction commences at claims that cannot be dealt with by the Court of Petty Sessions for Norfolk Island which deals with small claims and claims under $A10,000.

According to section 8 of the Coral Sea Islands Act 1969, "the courts of Norfolk Island" have jurisdiction "in and in relation to" the Coral Sea Islands Territory. The Supreme Court thus constitutes the superior court of the Coral Sea Islands. Jurisdiction is unlimited except for matters relating to the Offshore Petroleum and Greenhouse Gas Storage Act 2006.

Location of sittings

The Supreme Court may, if appropriate, sit in civil cases in New South Wales, Victoria or the ACT as well as in the Territory, but criminal cases must be dealt with in the Territory.

An appeal lies from the Supreme Court to a full court of the Federal Court.

The Supreme Court of Norfolk Island still relies upon the Supreme Court Act 1960 (Norfolk Island) – formerly the Supreme Court Ordinance 1960 – and relies for its Rules of Court and Procedure on the Rules of the Supreme Court of the Australian Capital Territory until such time as the Norfolk Island Court decides to make any specific Supreme Court Rule on a particular matter or topic.

== Judges ==
The Judges of the Supreme Court of Norfolk Island are generally appointed from among Justices of the Federal Court who may sit on the Australian mainland or they may convene the court on Norfolk Island depending on the type of matter they may be dealing with.

Supreme Court sittings are generally conducted on a circuit court basis with Judges attending on Norfolk Island where the volume of work may be sufficient to justify the travel or where a regular court sitting has not been convened for some time or where the law governing a particular matter may require that the court be convened on Norfolk Island and not elsewhere (e.g. most criminal law matters except sexual offences which may now be tried off-island).

The Court staff are generally resident on Norfolk Island.

List of Judges (including Chief Justices)

Position	Name	Appointment commenced	Appointment ended	Term	Comments	Notes
Chief Judge	Russell Fox AC, QC	22 January 1982	31 March 1989	7 years, 68 days	Federal Court	
Chief Judge	Trevor Morling	9 May 1989	1 February 1993	3 years, 268 days years	Federal Court	
Chief Justice	Bryan Beaumont AO	6 July 1993	2 August 2004	11 years, 27 days	Federal Court	
Chief Justice	Mark Weinberg	16 December 2004	19 July 2008	3 years, 216 days	Federal Court; ACT Supreme Court	
Chief Justice	Peter Jacobson	12 December 2008	25 January 2015	6 years, 44 days	Federal Court	
Chief Justice	Anthony Besanko	26 February 2015	7 May 2024	9 years, 71 days	Federal Court; ACT Supreme Court	
Chief Justice	Robert Bromwich	7 May 2024		1 year, 306 days	Federal Court	
Judge	Sir Richard Eggleston KC	27 October 1960	1969	8–9 years	Commonwealth Industrial Court (1960–1974); ACT Supreme Court (1960–1974)	
Judge	Sir Percy Joske CMG	10 December 1965	31 December 1977	12 years, 21 days	Commonwealth Industrial Court (1960–1977); ACT Supreme Court (1960–1977); NT Supreme Court (1961–1977)	
Judge	Edward Dunphy KC	17 March 1969	31 December 1982	13 years, 289 days	Commonwealth Industrial Court (1956–1982); ACT Supreme Court (1958–1982); Supreme Court of Christmas Island (1961–1982); Supreme Court of the Cocos (Keeling) Islands (1961–1982); Court of Appeal of Nauru (1967–1982)	
Judge	Robert St John	2 August 1978	31 March 1985	6 years, 241 days	Federal Court; Australian Industrial Court; ACT Supreme Court; NT Supreme Court	
Judge	Phillip Evatt DSC	11 February 1981	28 February 1987	6 years, 4 days	Federal Court	
Judge	Trevor Morling QC	8 March 1984	1 February 1993	8 years, 330 days	Federal Court	
Judge	Murray Wilcox AO, QC	6 July 1993	2 October 2006	13 years, 88 days	Chief Justice of Industrial Relations Court; Federal Court; ACT Supreme Court	
Judge	Bryan Beaumont AO	1989	2004	14–15 years	Federal Court	
Judge	Susan Kiefel AC	16 December 2004	3 September 2007	2 years, 261 days	Federal Court	
Judge	Peter Jacobson	28 June 2007	25 January 2015	7 years, 211 days	Federal Court	
Judge	Garry Downes AM	10 April 2008	15 May 2012	4 years, 35 days	Federal Court	
Judge	Bruce Lander	12 December 2008	31 August 2013	4 years, 262 days	Federal Court; ACT Supreme Court	
Judge	Robert Buchanan KC	2013	10 September 2016	2–3 years	Federal Court	
Judge	Anthony Besanko	5 August 2013		12 years, 216 days	Federal Court; ACT Supreme Court	
Judge	John Gilmour	26 February 2015		11 years, 11 days	Federal Court	
Judge	Michael Wigney	15 June 2017		8 years, 267 days	Federal Court; ACT Supreme Court	
Judge	Steven Rares	12 June 2018		7 years, 270 days	Federal Court; ACT Supreme Court; Supreme Court of Norfolk Island; Admiralty Rules Committee	
