= Lucy McCallum =

Australian judge (born 1963)

The Honourable Chief Justice Lucy McCallum

6th Chief Justice of the Australian Capital Territory
- Incumbent
- Assumed office 8 March 2022
- Preceded by: Helen Murrell

Judge of Appeal (NSW)
- In office 27 January 2019 – 7 March 2022

Judge of the Supreme Court of NSW
- In office 30 January 2008 – 7 March 2022

Personal details
- Born: 1963 (age 62–63) Sydney, Australia
- Education: North Sydney Girls High School
- Alma mater: University of New South Wales
- Occupation: Judge, lawyer

Lucy McCallum (born 1963) is the Chief Justice of the Australian Capital Territory and a former judge of the Supreme Court of New South Wales.

== Early life and education ==
McCallum was born in Sydney, New South Wales, one of five children of naval cipher officers Ann (née Priestley) and Douglas McCallum, and went to school at North Sydney Girls High School. McCallum studied Arts at the University of NSW, graduating in 1983, continuing on to graduate with a Bachelor of Laws in 1986. During her time at university McCallum worked as a volunteer at the Redfern Legal Centre and created a program to teach legal rights to school children.

== Career ==
McCallum commenced working as a solicitor in 1986 at Mallesons Stephen Jaques (now King & Wood Mallesons) in commercial litigation, before becoming a prosecutor in the Director of Public Prosecutions, initially for the Commonwealth and then Queensland until she became a barrister in 1991. McCallum practised in a wide range of areas that included defamation, administrative law, she was counsel assisting HIH Royal Commission, represented asbestos victims in the James Hardie Inquiry, and worked pro bono for refugees who were in immigration detention and in environmental matters.

=== Supreme Court of NSW ===
McCallum was appointed a judge of the NSW Supreme Court on 30 January 2008 in the Common Law Division. From 2014 McCallum was the list judge for the Defamation list, and has been the trial judge in numerous high-profile defamation and criminal cases, including a long running case brought by Helen Liu in which she sought to have journalists reveal their sources, and the trial of Simon Gittany for murder. McCallum was the first judge in Australia to consider whether Twitter was a separate publication of defamatory material.

In considering a sexual harassment claim brought by Brigette Styles against Clayton Utz, McCallum referred to emails by another solicitor as "no advertisement for male sensitivity; their author evidently no feminist. In one of the emails, Mr Izzo speaks of 'crazy single female chicks' who 'just need a good **** to get them back to normal'. It is difficult to decide whether it is more surprising that the remarks were made at all (after over a century of feminism) or that a lawyer recorded them in an email (after over seven centuries of subpoenas).

In January 2019, McCallum was elevated to the New South Wales Court of Appeal.
