= Independent Commission Against Corruption (South Australia) =

South Australian corruption commissioner

- Abbreviation: ICAC

Agency overview
- Formed: 2013
- Employees: 49.35 FTE (2024)

Jurisdictional structure
- Operations jurisdiction: South Australia, Australia
- Legal jurisdiction: As per operations jurisdiction
- Governing body: Parliament of South Australia
- Constituting instrument: Independent Commission Against Corruption Act 2012

Operational structure
- Headquarters: 55 Currie Street, Adelaide, South Australia, Australia
- Agency executives: Emma Townsend, Commissioner; Julie-Anne Burgess, Chief Executive Officer

Website
- icac.sa.gov.au
- The Commission is a law enforcement body established to promote and preserve the public's confidence in the integrity of the functions of public administration in South Australia.

The Independent Commission Against Corruption (ICAC) is a South Australian integrity agency and law enforcement body responsible for the prevention and investigation of corruption in public administration. The Commission was established by the Government of South Australia in 2013, and until 2021, could also investigate potential issues of misconduct and maladministration. Corruption investigations are undertaken in private. Strict confidentiality provisions prevent the disclosure or publication of any information that could reveal an investigation. Abnormally, the Commission itself is also prohibited from the publication of its investigative activities, resulting in a largely secret organisation. The agency is headed by the Independent Commissioner Against Corruption, an independent statutory officer appointed by the Governor and responsible to the Parliament. The Commission's functions and activities are subject to the oversight of the Inspector.

Bruce Lander KC was the agency's first Commissioner and commenced in 2013. Lander's term in office expired in 2020 and he was replaced by Ann Vanstone KC. In 2024, Vanstone resigned only four years into her seven-year term. In a public statement, Vanstone criticised legislative amendments to the Independent Commission Against Corruption Act 2012 that curtailed the Commission's jurisdiction, prohibited it from making direct referrals to the Director of Public Prosecutions, and removed its ability to issue public statements on investigations. In 2025, Emma Townsend, an experienced public prosecutor and the former Director of the Office for Public Integrity (OPI), was appointed the agency's incumbent Commissioner.

== History ==
In April 2014, it was reported that ICAC had received 752 complaints during its first eight months of operation. 43 claims of possible corruption were being investigated at this time.

In October 2014, it was reported that ICAC had opened 70 investigations during its first 12 months. As a result of a joint investigation with the South Australian Police into Operation Mantle, charges of theft and abuse of public office were laid against six police officers.

In February 2015, Lander announced that ICAC was investigating potential maladministration related to the sale of public land at Gillman, South Australia.

In April 2015, the Commissioner announced that prosecutions were pending following several investigations. An employee of the public sector, a 47-year-old woman from Redwood Park, was arrested and charged with abuse of public office, 233 counts of theft and 114 counts of dishonest dealing with documents. A 61-year-old Henley Beach man, previously employed in the public sector was charged with six counts of abuse of public office between February and July 2013. His alleged offences related to the improper use of information for personal gain.

In August 2015, an unnamed Chief Executive from a South Australian government agency was charged with two counts of abuse of public office. Attorney-General John Rau told the media that "the commissioner has made it clear on many occasions that he has not encountered in his investigations any evidence of systemic or institutional corruption in South Australia." In October 2015, it was revealed to be BioSA chief executive, Dr Jurgen Michaelis. In April 2016 it was announced that he would face corruption charges. It was alleged that he “improperly exercised a power or influence” on two occasions in 2012 while working on the development of the biotechnology sector within South Australia. No proof or charges had been made public at that time. In December 2016, Dr Michaelis pleaded "not guilty" to the charges.

In November 2015, the Commissioner sought State Government support to permit public hearings on cases of alleged maladministration. He also described his relationship with the SA Police Ombudsman as fractured, but improving.

In April 2016, ICAC investigations resulted in the charging of five men from the Department of Transport engaged in the misappropriation of goods purchased with government credit cards. The prosecutor later dropped charges against two of the accused.

In August 2017, Liberal MP Troy Bell resigned from his party after it was publicly announced that he would face 26 charges following an ICAC investigation into events prior to entering parliament. Bell resigned from the Liberal party but claimed innocence and expressed his intention to fight the charges in court. The charges included twenty of theft amounting to hundreds of thousands of dollars and six of dishonest dealing in documents. His case was delayed by legal argument relating to whether the ICAC could directly refer cases to the Director of Public Prosecutions and continue to investigate, rather than referring its findings to the police. The Supreme Court of South Australia found in December 2020 that the ICAC had acted within its powers.

In 2021, a bill was passed to reform the ICAC, including changing the name to the Independent Commission Against Corruption and removing some of its powers to investigate maladministration and misconduct.

== Legislation and regulation ==
The Commission was established under the Independent Commissioner Against Corruption Act 2012 and was amended in 2021 to the Independent Commission Against Corruption Act 2012. It is ultimately responsible to the Parliament of South Australia and is subject to the oversight of the Parliamentary Crime and Public Integrity Policy Committee. At the Commissioner's discretion, she or he may decide to keep the Attorney-General of South Australia informed on the progress of investigations.

== Reporting ==
Arrests or prosecutions made by the South Australian Police (SAPOL) resulting from matters referred to SAPOL by the Commission under the Independent Commission Against Corruption Act 2012 are reported in Annual Reports.

== See also ==
- Centre for Public Integrity (Australia)
- Crime in Adelaide
- Independent Broad-based Anti-corruption Commission
- Independent Commission Against Corruption (New South Wales)
- Independent Commissioner Against Corruption (Northern Territory)
