= Norfolk Island Court of Petty Sessions =

- Jurisdiction: Norfolk Island
- Location: Kingston
- Appeals to: Supreme Court of Norfolk Island
- Judge term length: mandatory retirement by age of 70
- Number of positions: 4 (1 Chief Magistrate; 3 Magistrates)

Chief Magistrate
- Currently: Wendy Cull
- Since: 8 June 2017

The Norfolk Island Court of Petty Sessions was created by the Court of Petty Sessions Act 1960 (Norfolk Island), and is the equivalent of most Australian mainland Magistrates' Courts or Local Courts.

== Jurisdiction ==
The court is constituted under the Court of Petty Sessions Act 1960 (NI). It is an inferior court and it is also a court of record. The court exercises a civil jurisdiction where sum does not exceed A$60,000. The court has criminal jurisdiction over matters of a summary nature relating to summary convictions, where a person is made liable to a penalty or punishment or to pay a sum of money for an offence, as well as minor family law applications. The jurisdiction of the court may be exercised by the Chief Magistrate or any of the 3 Magistrates, usually being three Justices of the Peace or Magistrates appointed or resident locally on Norfolk Island. The Chief Magistrate as of 8 June 2017 has been Wendy Cull.

A person may appeal a judgment of the court to the Supreme Court of Norfolk Island where, in civil proceedings, judgment is given for at least A$100, or in criminal proceedings, where the person has been fined not less than A$10 or sentenced to imprisonment for any term.

== Role ==
The Chief Magistrate of Norfolk Island is usually the office holder from time to time of the Chief Magistrate of the Australian Capital Territory (ACT). The Court of Petty Sessions usually sits once a month on Norfolk Island to deal with any pending criminal matters of a summary or regulatory nature. The Court can be convened by telephone/audio link up for more serious matters likely to require a committal hearing and eventual trial in the Supreme Court of Norfolk Island.
