= Ann Vanstone =

Australian lawyer

The Honourable Ann Vanstone KC

Independent Commissioner Against Corruption
- Incumbent
- Assumed office 2 September 2020
- Preceded by: Bruce Lander

Judge of the Supreme Court of South Australia
- In office 21 August 2003 – 13 June 2019

Personal details
- Education: University of Adelaide
- Occupation: Judge, lawyer

Ann Vanstone KC is an Australian lawyer. She was a crown prosecutor before being appointed as a judge of the District Court of South Australia from 1999 until 2003. She was then appointed to the Supreme Court of South Australia. Vanstone stepped down from the Supreme Court bench in June 2019.

On 27 July 2020, Vanstone was announced as the next South Australian Independent Commissioner Against Corruption, to take up the position on 1 September 2020.

== Early life and education ==
Vanstone went to Walford Church of England Girls Grammar School (now Walford Anglican School for Girls), in Adelaide.

== Career ==
Vanstone studied law at the University of Adelaide and following her graduation became a barrister in 1978. Vanstone became the deputy crown prosecutor in 1989 and the associate director of public prosecutions in 1992. Vanstone was appointed a Queen's Counsel in 1994 and was appointed a judge of the District Court in 1999.

=== Supreme Court of South Australia ===
Vanstone was appointed to the Supreme Court on 21 August 2003, only the third woman to be appointed after Dame Roma Mitchell and Margaret Nyland. By 2005 Robyn Layton had also been appointed to the Supreme Court and Nyland, Vanstone and Layton formed the first all female Court of Criminal Appeal in South Australia.

Vanstone has been the judge in numerous high-profile trials. In 2008 the High Court held by a 3:2 majority that Vanstone's directions to the jury in the trial of Jean Eric Gassy lacked neutrality and "merely restated the essential elements of the prosecution case, with barely a reference to the defence case". Following the trial of Eric John Hooper for causing serious harm to Robin Hay, because of Hooper's dangerous driving, Vanstone was critical of the six-year delay between the crash in July 2009 and bringing charges in June 2013. Vanstone sentenced Hooper to five years in prison and disqualified him from driving for ten years. She was also the judge for the trial of Dudley Davey for the murder of Gayle Woodford and in 2017 Vanstone sentenced Davey to life in prison with a non-parole period of 32 years.

In 2015 Vanstone was appointed to chair the Electoral Boundaries Commission which was required to attempt to set the boundaries so that the government is formed by the party that receives more than 50% of the vote. The decision of the Electoral Boundaries Commission was upheld on appeal to the Full bench of the Supreme Court. Vanstone retired from the Supreme Court on 13 June 2019.

=== Independent Commissioner Against Corruption ===
On 27 July 2020 Vanstone was selected as the new South Australian Independent Commissioner Against Corruption. She took up the role on 2 September 2020.

== Personal life ==
Vanstone's brother Tony is married to former federal minister Amanda Vanstone.
