= George Dethridge =

Australian judge

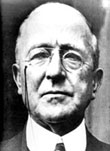
Justice George Dethridge

George James Dethridge (2 November 1863 – 29 December 1938) was an Australian judge. He was the inaugural Chief Judge of the Commonwealth Court of Conciliation and Arbitration, in office from 1926 until his death in 1938.

Dethridge was born in Bendigo, Victoria, the son of Mary, née Kipling, and James Dethridge. He grew up in Melbourne and was educated at St Stephen's Grammar School and a State school, both in Richmond and at Brunswick Business College before reaching Trinity College, University of Melbourne, graduating Bachelor of Arts (1890), Bachelor of Laws (1893), and Master of Laws (1897). He was called to the Victorian Bar in 1893, and became one of Melbourne's best-known barristers. In 1919, Dethridge chaired the Royal Commission on industrial troubles on Melbourne wharfs. The following year, he was appointed to the County Court of Victoria. He was named as the inaugural Chief Judge of the Commonwealth Court of Conciliation and Arbitration in 1926, following its reform by the Bruce government. In 1935, he was additionally appointed to the Federal Court of Bankruptcy, and an acting judge of the Supreme Court of the ACT. He was appointed chair of the Royal Commission on doctors' remuneration for national insurance service and other contract practice in 1938, but died suddenly before the report was completed.

== Other interests ==
Dethridge was a member of Melbourne's Bohemian Club.
