= Richard Kirby (arbitrator) =

Australian judge

The Honourable Sir Richard Kirby AC
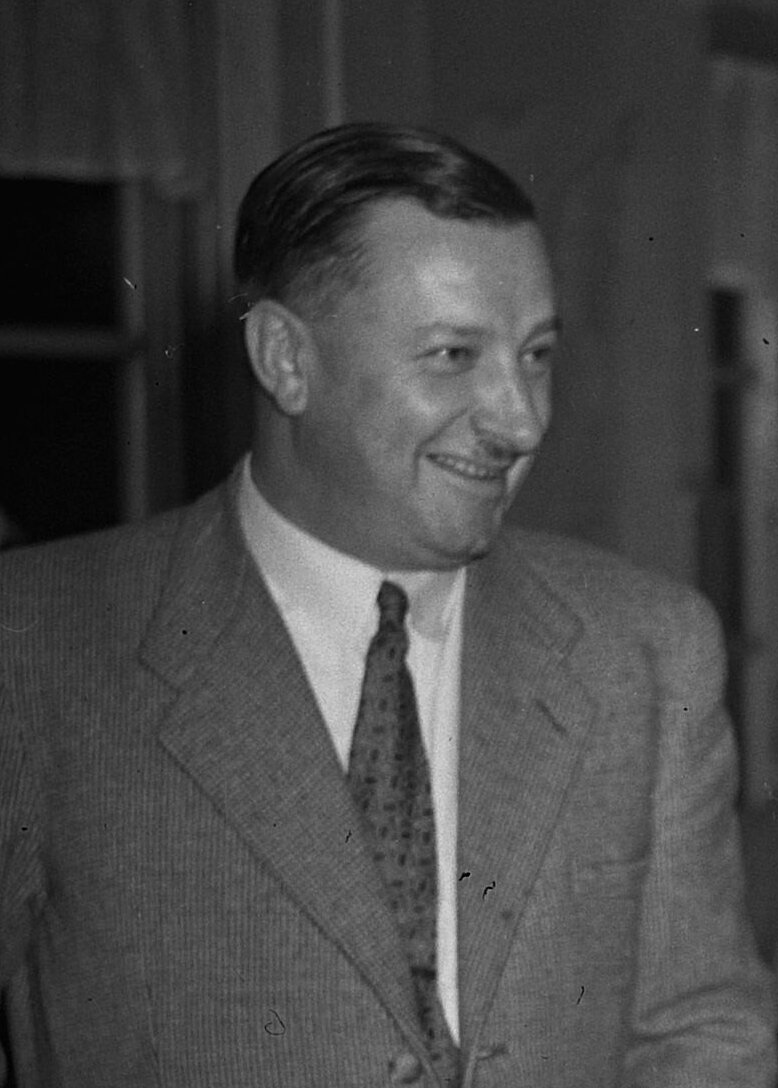
- Kirby in 1948

President of the Commonwealth Conciliation and Arbitration Commission
- In office 1956–1973
- Preceded by: Office established

Judge of the Commonwealth Court of Conciliation and Arbitration
- In office 26 August 1947 – 1973

Personal details
- Born: September 22, 1904 Charters Towers, Queensland, Australia
- Died: October 25, 2001 (aged 97) Sydney, New South Wales, Australia
- Education: The King's School, Parramatta; Sydney Law School

Sir Richard Clarence Kirby (22 September 1904 – 25 October 2001) was a long-serving president of the Australian Commonwealth Conciliation and Arbitration Commission (1956–1973) (having first been appointed to the Commission in 1947). In 1973, because of ill health, he retired from this post.

He was also a member of the Australian War Crimes Commission.

His biography was written by Blanche d'Alpuget in 1977.

== Early life ==
Richard Kirby was born on September 22, 1904, in Charters Towers, Queensland. He grew up in Sydney, where he attended The King's School, Parramatta before studying at the University of Sydney Law School.

He became a solicitor in 1928 and was admitted to the New South Wales Bar in 1933. He had a general legal practice which was interrupted by the Second World War, during which he served in the Second Australian Imperial Force from 1942 to 1944.

== Honours ==
Kirby was knighted in the 1961 New Year Honours. He was appointed a Companion of the Order of Australia (AC) in the 1985 Australia Day Honours

The bi-annual Sir Richard Kirby Lecture is now held in his honour.

It was often assumed he was the father of former High Court judge Michael Kirby (who has delivered the Sir Richard Kirby Lecture), but they were not related.

== Sources ==
- d'Alpuget, Blanche (1977), Mediator: A biography of Sir Richard Kirby
- Justice Michael Kirby: Sir Richard Kirby Lecture "SIR RICHARD KIRBY, MEDIATION AND INDUSTRIAL RELATIONS TODAY", 20 November 1996
