= Lionel Lukin (judge) =

Australian judge (1868–1944)

Justice Lionel Oscar Lukin (4 January 1868 — 1 June 1944) was appointed as the first judge of the Supreme Court of the Australian Capital Territory, Australia on 25 January 1934 and remained the sole Judge of the Court until November 1943 when he retired due to ill health.

== Early life ==
Lukin was born in Condamine, Queensland, and was educated at schools in Roma, Gympie and Brisbane (Brisbane Grammar School). He was a nephew of Gresley Lukin.

== Judicial career ==
Caricature by David Low

During his tenure on the Capital Territory Court, Lukin was also a Judge of the Federal Court of Bankruptcy. This meant that he did not sit full-time on the Capital Territory Court. Additionally, Lukin was also a judge on the Supreme Court of Queensland from 26 July 1910 until his retirement from the court on 18 July 1926. He preferred to reside in Brisbane and travelled to Rockhampton by train to discharge his duties. This allowed him to be a member of every Full Court.

In 1929 Lukin was sitting as a judge on the Commonwealth Court of Conciliation and Arbitration, where he handed down a new award for timber workers reducing wages and increasing weekly hours from 44 to 48. This precipitated the 1929 Timber Workers strike which lasted for 5 months.

Lukin died in 1944 and was buried in Lutwyche Cemetery.

== See also ==
- Judiciary of Australia
- List of Judges of the Supreme Court of Queensland
