= Peter Jacobson (judge) =

Australian judge

The Honourable Peter Michael Jacobson KC

Judge of the Federal Court of Australia
- In office 17 June 2002 – 24 January 2015

Peter Michael Jacobson KC is a retired Judge of the Federal Court of Australia, having served from 17 June 2002 until 24 January 2015. He was in practice as a barrister before his appointment to the bench, practicing extensively in trade practices, commercial law, and equity. In May 1979 he was admitted to the NSW Bar Association.

He attended and was in the athletics team of Sydney Boys High School from 1957–61, he then graduated with a Bachelor of Arts and Bachelor of Laws (Honors) from the University of Sydney. He obtained a Master of Laws from the University of Pennsylvania Law School in Philadelphia and was a member of the Faculty of Law at McGill University in Montreal before returning to Australia in 1976. From 1976 to 1979, he practised as a solicitor.
