= John Nimmo (judge) =

Australian judge

Sir John Angus Nimmo CBE QC (15 January 1909 – 7 July 1997) was an Australian judge. From 1972 to 1974 he was Chief Justice of Fiji.

He attended the University of Melbourne, and while living there was a member of the Commonwealth Tax Board of Review (1947–54). He was appointed Queen's Counsel in 1957 and was an acting justice of the Supreme Court of Victoria in 1963. He was also Deputy President of the Trade Practices Tribunal (1966–73), Deputy President of the Commonwealth Conciliation and Arbitration Commission (1964–69), Chairman of the Health Insurance Committee of Inquiry (1968–69), additional Justice of the Supreme Court of the Northern Territory (1969–74), Commissioner inquiring into unlawful land subdivisions south of Darwin (1974–75), and Royal Commissioner into matters relating to Norfolk Island (1975–76).

From 1969 to 1977 he was a judge of the Australian Industrial Court, moving to the Australian Capital Territory in 1977 to become a judge of the Federal Court, a position he held until 1980.

In 1970 he was appointed Commander of the Order of the British Empire, becoming a knight bachelor in 1972, when he was appointed Chief Justice of Fiji. He was also an Officer of the Order of St John of Jerusalem.
