= Murray Wilcox =

Australian judge (1937–2018)

The Honourable Justice Murray Rutledge Wilcox AO, QC

Judge of the Federal Court of Australia
- In office 11 May 1984 – 2 October 2006

Chief Justice Industrial Relations Court of Australia
- In office 30 March 1994 – 2 October 2006

Judge Supreme Court (Norfolk Island)
- In office 6 July 1993 – 2 October 2006

Additional Judge Supreme Court (ACT)
- In office 23 April 1983 – 30 September 2006

Personal details
- Born: 1937
- Died: 8 November 2018 (aged 81 )
- Occupation: Judge, barrister

Murray Rutledge Wilcox, AO, QC (1937–2018) was an Australian Federal Court Judge, serving from 11 May 1984 until retiring on 2 October 2006. He also served as an additional judge of the Supreme Court of the Australian Capital Territory from 23 April 1983 to 30 September 2006, and Chief Justice of the Industrial Relations Court of Australia between 1994 and his retirement in 2006. He may be best remembered for handing down the controversial Noongar Native Title ruling a fortnight before retiring.

In October 1993 his book An Australian Charter of Rights was launched by Michael Kirby. The Australian reported a concomitant "attack" on Australia's human rights laws as inadequate to prevent "discrimination" and a potential "international embarrassment". Wilcox was quoted as saying that "Parliaments and the common law [are] not doing their jobs". In particular, they did not do enough to extirpate racial and sexual discrimination or to protect homosexuals. Kirby agreed that Parliament was "spineless" in such areas.

Wilcox was a committed environmentalist, and was President of the Australian Conservation Foundation 1979–1984.

In May 2007, Wilcox gave the Blackburn Lecture to the ACT Law Society. In his speech, he claimed that Australia was becoming an "elected dictatorship" as a result of a concentration of power in Canberra and the position of Prime Minister of Australia at the hand of John Howard.

Wilcox was appointed an Officer of the Order of Australia (AO) in the 2010 Australia Day Honours "for service to the law as a Judge and a Law Reform Commissioner, particularly in the areas of environmental, native title and industrial law".

Wilcox died on 8 November 2018.
