= Russell Fox =

Australian judge (1920–2013)

Russell Walter Fox
- Born: 30 September 1920; Strathfield, New South Wales
- Died: 22 December 2013 (aged 93)
- Education: North Sydney Boys High School; Royal Military College, Duntroon; University of Sydney
- Occupations: author educator jurist judge

Russell Walter Fox AC QC LLB (30 September 1920 – 22 December 2013) was an Australian author, educator, jurist, and chief judge of the Supreme Court of the Australian Capital Territory. He is best known for his extensive report on uranium mining in Australia in the early 1980s.

== Early years ==
Fox was born at Strathfield, New South Wales in 1920. He was educated at North Sydney Boys High School, the Royal Military College, Duntroon and the University of Sydney.

During the Second World War, he was a lieutenant in the Australian Staff Corps between 1940 and 1942. He enlisted with the Australian Imperial Force (AIF) on 3 March 1942 at Paddington in Sydney. Whilst serving his country, he married his wife Shirley in 1943. Fox and his new wife were to have three sons and one daughter. He served in the army until his discharge on 23 March 1945 when he was discharged with the rank of captain.

Fox was admitted to the New South Wales bar in 1949. In 1952 he became one of the examiners for Solicitors Admissions Board in New South Wales and continued in that role until 1955. In 1958 Fox jointly took over the post of General Editor of the Australian Law Journal from Rae Else-Mitchell. He held this post jointly with Nigel Bowen until 1960. From 1960 until 1967, he was the sole editor of the journal. He published eight volumes, numbered 32 to 40, and was one of the few editors who either was not, or did not become, a judge of the New South Wales Supreme Court. In those days of the journal, there was only one law school in New South Wales, and Fox had to write many of the articles himself rather than just be an editor.

Fox was appointed Queens Counsel in 1963. He lectured post-graduate law students for the degree of Master of Laws at the University of Sydney. He taught in this role from 1965 to 1967. Whilst there he encouraged fellow lecturer Graham Hill (who was also to become a judge) to write Stamp, Death, Estate and Gift Duties (New South Wales, Commonwealth and Australian Capital Territory), a standard text on the subject in Australia.

== Judicial appointment ==
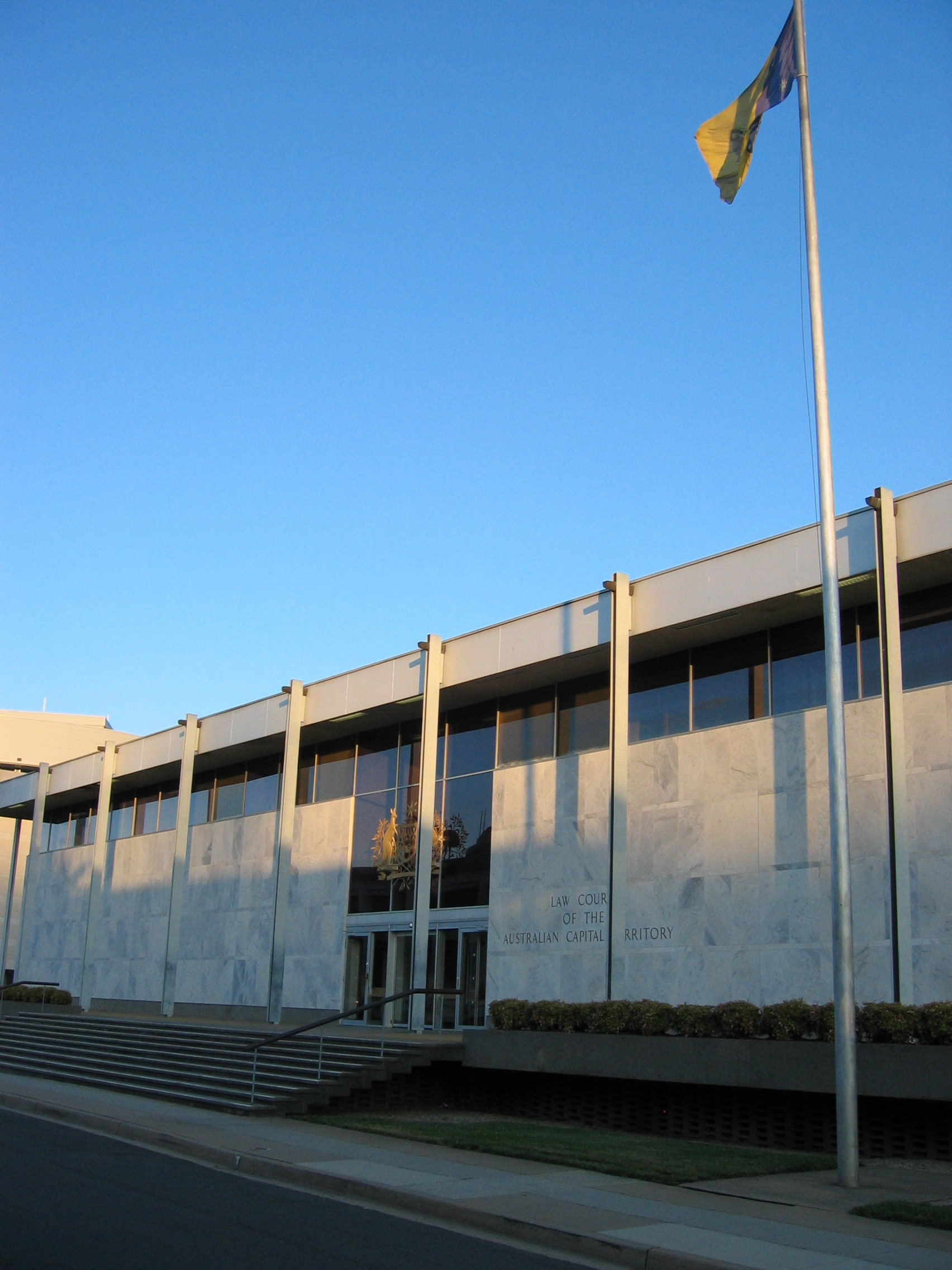
Picture of the Supreme Court building in Canberra

Fox was appointed a judge of the Supreme Court of the Australian Capital Territory on 7 August 1967. In 1969 he was asked by the Australian Government to chair an inquiry into allegations of bastardization of cadets at the Duntroon Military College. At least one officer was removed from command as a result of the findings of the inquiry.

In 1973 he heard a case concerning the construction of a communications tower on Black Mountain, overlooking Canberra. The tower is now known as “Telstra Tower”, but was originally known as Black Mountain Tower. The plaintiffs sought a review of the building process, asserting that the erection of the tower would constitute a “public nuisance”, impairing the mountain skyline. This was to be one of the first environmental cases in the Australian Capital Territory. Fox dismissed the case, as there were neither legal grounds nor any laws that could prevent the construction of the tower. However, Fox in his judgement expressed the hope that “the law would develop to fairly deal with environmental issues”. This hope was to be realised later, with the passing of an Environment Act.

In 1975, Fox was asked by then prime minister Gough Whitlam to chair an inquiry into uranium mining. The inquiry was to report on whether or not uranium mining should be permitted in Australia. In particular, the inquiry was to focus upon whether uranium should be mined along the East Alligator River in the Northern Territory of Australia. His fellow commissioners were Graeme George Kelleher and Charles Baldwin Kerr. The inquiry engaged eight part-time specialist advisors on various aspects of uranium mining. This inquiry is usually referred to in the media as the Ranger Uranium Mine Inquiry although that mine was established after the completion of the report. The Inquiry is more correctly known in academic publications as the “Fox Inquiry”.

The inquiry was held over a two-year period and required 121 days of hearings. The commissioners heard 303 witnesses and considered over 400 documents. The inquiry generated 13,000 pages of transcript. During the course of the enquiry, Malcolm Fraser, who had replaced Whitlam as prime minister, asked Fox to bring the inquiry to a speedy conclusion. The media also assumed that Fox would deliver a report favorable to mining interests. However, Fox maintained his independence throughout and ensured that the inquiry proceeded without any political or media interference. Author Les Dalton argues that the inquiry is probably unique in Australian history for its openness and public participation. The resulting report is regarded as Australia's most comprehensive environmental report and is cited in any debate on uranium mining in Australia today. The inquiry gave a highly conditional approval for uranium mining to proceed.

Fox was appointed as one of the judges of the newly established Federal Court of Australia in 1977. He held both that appointment and his appointment on the Supreme Court of the Australian Capital Territory from 1977 until his retirement in 1989.

On 1 February 1977, he was appointed as the first Chief Judge of the Supreme Court of the Australian Capital Territory and held that post until 3 November of that year. He left that post to become Australia's only ever Ambassador-at-Large for nuclear non-proliferation and safeguards. To take on that position, a special Act of Parliament was passed giving him leave to do so. A second Act of Parliament extended that appointment until the end of 1980. In 1977, Fox, in an independent and confidential report to the Australian Government, questioned the United States' nuclear safeguards strategy. The federal opposition released the report, causing embarrassment for the Australian government, as that strategy was a key point in the government's attempt to sell uranium.

Fox was also critical of the Hawke Labor government's ratification of the Vienna Convention on drugs in 1988. Fox supported the making of arrangements to eliminate illegal drug traffickers. However, he did not believe that adherence to unsuccessful treaties from over twenty years ago would adequately deal with the problems of drugs in modern society. Fox was to become a prolific writer on the subject of drug policy, writing many papers on the issue in respected journals.

Fox became chairman of the Australian Institute of Judicial Administration in 1980. The institute is a major Australian organisation dealing with judicial administration in Australia, and is funded by the Attorneys General of each Australian State and Territory. He served in that role until 1984.

Fox was appointed Chief Judge of the Supreme Court of Norfolk Island in 1982 and held that position until 1989. That court is the highest court for the island, which is a territory of Australia. On 12 June 1989 Fox was made a Companion of the Order of Australia and he also received the Australian Centenary Medal in 2003. In 2006, the library at the Supreme Court of the Australian Capital Territory was named after him.

After Fox's retirement as a judicial officer, he became an adjunct professor to the University of Technology Sydney in 1994. He taught in this role until 2006.

== Books and articles published ==
- Marks, Robert E. ‘Costs of the Prohibitions’ in Drugs Policy: Fact, Fiction and the Future, edited by Russell Fox and Ian Matthews [Sydney, Federation Press: 1990],
- Justice in the Twenty-First Century (2000), Russell Fox. Federation Press.
- “Examining existing drugs policies”. Russell Fox. Criminology Australia 1 (3) January–February 1990 pp. 10–11.
- “Brigadier Geoffrey David Solomon, OBE (1920-2005)” Russell Fox. Australian Army Journal, v.3, no.1, Summer 2005–2006. pp. 293–294
- "Nuclear non proliferation” Fox, Russell W. Australian Quarterly, v.53, no.4, Summer 1981. pp. 419–432.
- "Youth and Atomic Weapons" Fox, Russell W. The Australian Journal of Forensic Sciences. Volume 19, Issue 1/2; Dec 1986. pp. 25–34

== Sources ==
- “The Fox Inquiry: Public Policy Making in Open Forum” (by Les Dalton)
- Who's Who Australia 2007.
- Ranger Uranium Environmental Inquiry report ISBN 0-642-02260-7
