= Bryan Beaumont =

Australian judge (1938–2005)

Bryan Alan Beaumont AO QC (29 December 1938 – 12 June 2005) was a Judge of the Federal Court of Australia from May 1983 until February 2005. He also held positions in the legal systems of Pacific countries including Papua New Guinea, Tonga, Fiji and Vanuatu.

== Early life and education ==
Beaumont was born on 29 December 1938 in Brisbane. When he was two, the family moved to Sydney, where he attended Erskineville Opportunity School, excelling as a leg spin bowler, and from 1951 to 1955 Sydney Boys' High School, where he received prizes in Latin, history and sport. Beaumont obtained a Bachelor of Laws (LLB) degree with honours at the University of Sydney in 1961, after studying for five years part-time while working as an articled clerk. As an LLB student, he gained the nickname 'the Chief', because of his apparent ability to predict questions that would appear on examination papers. He was awarded two major prizes: the Pitt Cobbett Prize for Constitutional Law and the Sir John Peden Memorial Prize for Constitutional and Private Law.

== Legal career ==
Beaumont was admitted to the New South Wales Bar in 1965, after serving as Associate to Supreme Court Judge Robert Macfarlan. He demonstrated a particular proficiency in constitutional law, appearing regularly before the High Court and the Privy Council, and in 1973 began working as a consultant to the government of Papua New Guinea, advising on judicial and constitutional matters relating to the country's imminent independence from Australia. In 1978, his legal skills were recognised with an appointment as Queen's Counsel. In 1981, Beaumont was chosen to chair the Royal Commission into the Tasmanian Constitution, which resulted in an improvement in the structure of the Tasmanian Houses of Parliament.

Beaumont was appointed a judge of the Federal Court of Australia in 1983. Notable judgements during his period at the Federal Court include those in Apple Computer Inc v Computer Edge Pty Ltd (1984), pertaining to copyright law; Trade Practices Commission v Arnotts Ltd (1990), relating to competition law; and Western Australia v Ward (2002), which was an important case about Aboriginal title law. He retired from the Federal Court on 10 February 2005, making him at the time the longest serving judge of any federal court in Australia.

At the same time as he was appointed a Federal Court judge, Justice Beaumont began serving as a judge of the Supreme Court of the Australian Capital Territory and a Presidential Member of the Commonwealth Administrative Appeals Tribunal. From 1989 to 2004, he was also a judge of the Supreme Court of Norfolk Island, and Chief Justice of this court from 1993. Other courts on which Justice Beaumont served while on the Federal Court included the Tonga Court of Appeal, the Supreme Court of Fiji and the Supreme Court of Vanuatu.

Outside of the courtroom, Beaumont was involved in a number of committees and councils, including chairing the Council of the Australian Institute of Judicial Administration from 1990 to 1992. He was also the Patron of the University of Sydney Women's College Foundation.

== Awards and honours ==
His international standing was recognised by election as a distinguished foreign member of the American Law Institute and as a visiting fellow on two occasions at Wolfson College, Cambridge. Beaumont was appointed an Officer of the Order of Australia on 26 January 2005, for services to the judiciary. In April of that year, he received a Doctor of Laws (LLD) honorary degree from the University of Sydney.
