= Supreme Court of Christmas Island =

The Supreme Court of Christmas Island was the highest court for Christmas Island, an external territory of Australia. The court was originally established in 1958 after sovereignty over the island was transferred from the United Kingdom to Australia. The court had jurisdiction to deal with all serious crimes and major civil claims for damages occurring on the island. The court was abolished on 10 May 2002.

Judges from Australian courts were appointed to be judges of the court. Those judges would travel to the island to hear, consider and determine cases. In 1992, courts in Western Australia were given concurrent authority to deal with cases on the island, and those courts became the main venue in which litigation was conducted. Since the court's abolition, its functions have been replaced by the Supreme Court of Western Australia, which now has sole jurisdiction on the island.

== First courts on the island ==
Europeans first discovered the island of Christmas Island on Christmas Day, 25 December 1643. Captain William Mynors gave the island its name because of the day it was found.

The British Crown annexed the uninhabited island on 6 June 1888 following the discovery of phosphate on the island. The island was annexed to the Straits Settlements colony on 10 June 1900. Japanese Imperial Forces occupied the island during the Second World War. After the end of the Second World War, a military court was set up in Singapore to prosecute seven people for mutiny during the war. With the dissolution of the Straits Settlements in 1946, the island was included within the new Singapore colony. On 1 October 1958, sovereignty over the island was transferred to the Australian Government following a payment to the Government of Singapore, after a brief period as a separate British colony.

Until 1992, Singapore laws continued to apply to the island, although this changed when legislation was passed bringing the laws of the country into line with Australian law.

== Court history ==
In 1958 Australia accepted Christmas Island as a territory, and established the court under the Christmas Island Act 1958. The court was designated a superior court of record and had all the same powers that other supreme courts in Australia had. The court was to be constituted according to local ordinances made by the Governor-General of Australia on the advice of the Australian Government.

The court was a superior court and a court of record. Judges appointed by the Governor-General constituted it as required. The court was permitted to sit anywhere in Australia as the interests of justice required, and was not confined to hearing a case on the island. When hearing criminal cases, the court sat with a jury to determine an accused person's guilt. If the court sat outside the island, the court could use jurors from the State or Territory that the court was actually sitting at.

In 1987, a murder trial before the court was aborted by Justice John Gallop on the grounds that no impartial jury could be found among the island's residents. The trial was subsequently moved to Perth, where a local jury found two men guilty of murdering Soo Ten Chan in order to steal his gambling winnings. The case exposed a number of issues with Christmas Island's justice system: the local assembly had to pass an ordinance to allow for a jury trial, as there was previously no such legal right, and the federal government subsequently had to amend the Christmas Island Act to allow for the court to be moved to Perth.

== Judges of the court ==
Name	Position	From	To	Term	Comments	Notes
Edward Arthur Dunphy	Judge	9 March 1961	31 December 1982	21 years, 297 days	Commonwealth Industrial Court (1956–1982); ACT Supreme Court (1958–1982); Supreme Court of the Cocos (Keeling) Islands (1961–1982); Supreme Court of Norfolk Island (1969–1982); Court of Appeal of Nauru (1967–1982)	
Sir William Forster	Judge	20 September 1979	30 January 1989	9 years, 132 days	NT Supreme Court (1971–1985)	
John Gallop	Additional Judge	20 September 1979	8 May 1989	9 years, 230 days	ACT Supreme Court (1982–2000)	
John Gallop	Judge	9 May 1989	30 July 2000	11 years, 82 days	ACT Supreme Court (1982–2000)	
Robert French	Additional Judge	9 May 1989	15 November 2000	11 years, 190 days		

== Notable cases ==
In April 1988 the court tried two defendants concerning the murder of Tan Soo Cher (Tan). Tan had been murdered during the early hours of 12 May 1987 by the infliction of multiple stab wounds to the front and back of his torso and his arms. The defendants were alleged to have approached Tan in the hope of borrowing money. On the defendants’ version of events, Tan refused and brandished a knife. The defendants claimed to have disarmed Tan, stabbed him, and then left with the money found on Tan. The defendants argued self-defence at their trial.

The trial was held in Western Australia rather than Christmas Island and led to the conviction of the defendants. On appeal to the Federal Court of Australia, Justices Jenkinson, Spender and French ordered new trials because the jury was not properly directed as to provocation. The case was unusual in that the defendants were tried on the basis of a murder charge under the Singapore Criminal Code, which continued to apply on Christmas Island, rather than Australian law. The Court remarked that the case highlighted "the legal twilight" in which Australians on Christmas Island lived. The Court said that criminal laws were established under the Singapore Code, unchanged since 1958, which in turn had been based on the Indian Penal Code drafted in 1837 and introduced in India in 1862. This all led to the unsatisfactory situation of prosecuting Australians under Singaporean law.

== Abolition of the court ==
Since 1992, courts in Western Australia have undertaken the work of the court under a service delivery arrangement with the Commonwealth Government. This was introduced at the same time as the introduction of Western Australian law to the island. The Western Australian Magistrates Court, District Court, Supreme Court, Family Court, Children's Court and Coroner's Court all provide services to the island as required. As a result, a separate superior court in the territory was no longer necessary. A proclamation issued by the Governor-General formally abolished the Court on 10 May 2002.
