= Commonwealth Industrial Court =

Former Court of Australia, replaced by the Federal Court of Australia

- Australian Industrial Court (post-1973)
- Established: 1956
- Dissolved: 1977 (de facto); 2004 (de jure)
- Jurisdiction: Australia
- Composition method: Appointed by Governor-General on the recommendation of the federal government
- Authorised by: Constitution of Australia Conciliation and Arbitration Act 1956
- Appeals to: High Court of Australia
- Judge term length: Life

The Commonwealth Industrial Court, known as the Australian Industrial Court from 1973, was a specialist court to deal with industrial matters, principally the enforcement of awards and orders of the Commonwealth Conciliation and Arbitration Commission. Over time it took on more matters and its judges were allocated a wide range of judicial tasks until it was replaced in 1977 by the Federal Court of Australia which had a more general jurisdiction covering matters arising under Australian federal law.

== Background ==
From 1904 until 1956 the Commonwealth Court of Conciliation and Arbitration had exercised both arbitration functions, hearing and settling interstate industrial disputes by making awards, and judicial functions such as interpreting and enforcing those awards. In the Boilermaker's case, the High Court held that a tribunal could not create new rights such as making an award, the arbitration function, and enforce those rights, the judicial function, due to the separation of powers in the Australian Constitution. The functions of the court were split, with the judicial functions being given to the newly created Commonwealth Industrial Court and the arbitration functions being given to the Commonwealth Conciliation and Arbitration Commission. The six remaining judges, were similarly split with two judges, Edward Dunphy and Sir Edward Morgan, being appointed to the Commonwealth Industrial Court and four, Sir Richard Kirby, Alfred Foster, Sydney Wright and Richard Ashburner being appointed to the Commonwealth Conciliation and Arbitration Commission.

== Establishment and operation ==
The Australian Government challenged the High Court's decision in the Boilermaker's case and obtained special leave to appeal to the Privy Council on 1 June 1956. The Australian parliament did not wait for the outcome of the appeal, passing the Conciliation and Arbitration Act which received assent on 30 June 1956. The court was formally established on 15 August 1956 and then Attorney-General John Spicer was appointed the first, and as it transpired, only, Chief Judge. Judges of the Commonwealth Court of Conciliation and Arbitration had previously been appointed to act in various courts, This practice continued with appointments to the supreme courts of the Australian Capital Territory, Christmas, Cocos (Keeling), & Norfolk Islands. Sir John Spicer was appointed to the first Royal Commission into the collision between HMAS Melbourne and HMAS Voyager, and inquiries into the aviation crashes of TAA Flight 538 (1960), Ansett-ANA Flight 325 (1961) and Ansett-ANA Flight 149 (1966). Judges were also appointed to committees to review legislation and report to parliament, such as the appointment of Sir John Spicer to the Copyright Law Review Committee, and John Kerr to the Commonwealth Administrative Review Committee. The Copyright Law Review Committee subsequently recommended the appointment of the Copyright Tribunal and Sir John Spicer was appointed as its president. When the Australian Parliament passed the Trade Practices Act in 1965, the Commonwealth Industrial Court was given power to enforce orders of the Trade Practices Tribunal, and Sir Richard Eggleston was appointed the first president of the Trade Practices Tribunal. In 1976 when the Administrative Appeals Tribunal was established appeals were to the Australian Industrial Court, adding yet another non-industrial matter to the Court's jurisdiction, and Gerard Brennan was appointed as the first President of the Administrative Appeals Tribunal.

== Replacement by Federal Court ==
The establishment of a federal court was proposed at least as early as 1957, and was announced by Nigel Bowen, the Attorney-General, in 1967. Bowen said that a Commonwealth superior court was necessary because the burden of work in the High Court's original jurisdiction might limit its capacity to perform its primary roles of interpreting the Constitution and as the court of ultimate appeal. It was however another 9 years until the Federal Court was established, absorbing the jurisdiction of the Australian Industrial Court, the Federal Court of Bankruptcy and some of the original jurisdiction of the High Court, including appeals from the supreme courts of the territories.

It was initially announced that no judge would be appointed over the age of 65, When judges were appointed to the Federal Court on 1 February 1977, two judges over the age of 65 were appointed, Sir Reginald Smithers then aged 73 and Sir John Nimmo, then aged 68. Two judges of the Australian Industrial Court were not appointed to the Federal Court, Sir Percy Joske, then aged 81 and Edward Dunphy, then aged 69. The Constitutional amendment to section 72, which introduced a retirement age of 70, did not come in to force until 29 July 1977.

The last judge Ray Northrop retired in 1998 however the court was not formally abolished until 2004.

== Judges ==
Combined list of judges of the Commonwealth Industrial Court / Australian Industrial Court
Position	Name	From	To	Term	Comments	Notes
Chief Judge	Sir John Spicer	15 August 1956	1 November 1976	20 years, 78 days	Formerly the Australian Attorney-General	
Judge	Edward Dunphy	16 May 1949	31 December 1982	33 years, 229 days	A judge of the Commonwealth Court of Conciliation and Arbitration, judge of the supreme courts of the Australian Capital Territory, Christmas, Cocos (Keeling) & Norfolk Islands	
Judge	Sir Edward Morgan	4 August 1952	31 May 1960	7 years, 301 days	A judge of the Commonwealth Court of Conciliation and Arbitration, judge of the Supreme Court (ACT)	
Judge	Sir Percy Joske CMG	3 June 1960	31 December 1977	17 years, 211 days	Judge of the supreme courts of the Australian Capital Territory & Norfolk Island	
Judge	Sir Richard Eggleston	4 June 1960	30 June 1974	14 years, 26 days	Judge of the supreme courts of the Australian Capital Territory & Norfolk Island	
Judge	Sir Reginald Smithers	20 January 1965	30 September 1986	21 years, 253 days	Judge of the Supreme Court (ACT)	
Judge	(Sir) John Kerr	3 November 1966	22 May 1972	5 years, 201 days	Formerly a judge of the Supreme Court (ACT), appointed Chief Justice of NSW	
Judge	Sir John Nimmo	29 April 1969	30 June 1980	11 years, 62 days	Judge of the Supreme Court (ACT)	
Judge	Edward Woodward	18 May 1972	31 July 1990	18 years, 74 days	Judge of the Supreme Court (ACT)	
Judge	Robert Franki	23 May 1972	5 August 1986	14 years, 74 days	Formerly a Deputy President of the Commonwealth Conciliation and Arbitration Commission, judge of the Supreme Court (ACT)	
Judge	John Sweeney	30 November 1973	7 May 1981	7 years, 158 days	Formerly a Deputy President of the Commonwealth Conciliation and Arbitration Commission, judge of the Supreme Court (ACT)	
Judge	Phillip Evatt DSC	2 July 1974	28 February 1987	12 years, 241 days	Judge of the supreme courts of the Australian Capital Territory & Norfolk Island	
Judge	Robert St John	15 April 1975	31 March 1985	9 years, 350 days	Judge of the supreme courts of the Australian Capital Territory & Norfolk Island	
Judge	Ray Northrop	9 March 1976	31 August 1998	22 years, 175 days	Judge of the Supreme Court (ACT)	
Judge	(Sir) Gerard Brennan	28 June 1976	12 February 1981	4 years, 229 days	Judge of the Supreme Court (ACT), appointed to the High Court	
