= Bruce Lander =

Australian judge (born 1946)

The Honourable Bruce Lander KC

First Independent Commissioner Against Corruption (South Australia)
- In office 2 September 2013 – 2 September 2020
- Succeeded by: Ann Vanstone

Judge of the Federal Court of Australia
- In office 14 July 2003 – 31 August 2013

Judge of the Supreme Court of the Australian Capital Territory
- In office January 2004 – 31 August 2013

Judge of Supreme Court of Norfolk Island
- In office December 2008 – 31 August 2013

Justice of the Supreme Court of South Australia
- In office November 1994 – July 2003

Personal details
- Born: Bruce Thomas Lander; 13 November 1946 (age 80) Adelaide
- Citizenship: Australia
- Spouse: Elizabeth (m. 1968)
- Children: Sarah Amy Kate Thomas
- Profession: Lawyer
- Website: www.jeffcottchambers.com.au/bruce-lander

Bruce Thomas Lander KC (born 13 November 1946) is a former Australian judge and public figure, who is best known for his role as the first Independent Commissioner Against Corruption in South Australia (replaced by Ann Vanstone on 2 September 2020), and as a former Judge of the Federal Court of Australia. He was appointed to this position in 2011, and has since made significant contributions to the field of corruption prevention and enforcement in Australia.

Prior to his appointment as Independent Commissioner Against Corruption, Lander served as a judge in the South Australian District Court and as a commissioner in the South Australian Equal Opportunity and Human Rights Commission. He has a reputation as a fair and impartial judge, with a strong commitment to justice and the rule of law.

Throughout his career, Lander has been recognized for his contributions to the legal profession, and has received numerous awards and honors for his work. He has also been an active member of various professional organizations, and has served on several committees and boards related to the administration of justice and human rights.

Despite his achievements, Lander remains a relatively low-profile public figure.

== Early life and educ.ation ==
Bruce Lander was born on 13 November 1946, the son of George and Shylie Hamilton (née Taylor). After completing his secondary education at Unley High School, Lander studied law at the University of Adelaide, graduating in April 1968.

== Legal career ==
Lander began his legal career in 1969 as a Barrister and Solicitor of the Supreme Court of South Australia. He became a partner of Baker McEwin & Co in 1971, two years after his admission. He completed his articles with Baker McEwin & Co. (which later became Minter Ellison), and remained there until 1980. Lander then joined the independent bar and became a founder of Jeffcott Chambers.

He practiced as a solicitor until 1981 when he signed the Bar roll. In 1986 he was appointed as one of Her Majesty's Counsel.

In November 1994, Lander was appointed as a Judge of the Supreme Court of South Australia. He continued serving in this position until he was appointed a Judge of the Federal Court of Australia on 14 July 2003. Later judicial appointments include becoming an additional Judge of the Supreme Court of the Australian Capital Territory in January 2004, a Deputy President of the Administrative Appeals Tribunal in November 2005 and a Judge of the Supreme Court of Norfolk Island in December 2008.

During 2010 and 2011, he was a part-time member of the Australian Law Reform Commission, as part of the Inquiry into Discovery.

On 19 February 2013 it was announced that the Honourable Bruce Lander would be appointed to become South Australia's first Independent Commissioner Against Corruption. He resigned his judicial appointments on 31 August 2013. His term ended on 1 September 2020 and he was replaced by Ann Vanstone.

He has worked closely with the School of Law at Flinders University, from which he received an honorary degree in April 2013.

Bruce Lander is currently an Associate Member at Jeffcott Chambers.

== Personal life ==
Bruce Lander married Elizabeth in 1968. They have three daughters and one son, as well as 4 grandchildren. Among his interests, he lists reading, watching football and gardening.
