= Supreme Court of the Cocos (Keeling) Islands =

The Supreme Court of the Cocos (Keeling) Islands is the de jure superior court for the Cocos (Keeling) Islands, an Australian external territory. The court was originally established in 1958 after the British Government transferred sovereignty for the islands from Singapore to Australia. The court had jurisdiction to deal with all serious crimes and major civil claims for damages occurring on the Island.

Judges from Australian courts were appointed to be judges of the court. Those judges would travel to the island to hear, consider and determine cases. In 1992 courts in Western Australia were given concurrent authority to deal with cases on the islands, and those courts have now become the only venue in which litigation is conducted. The court does not now actually decide cases and since 2006 has had no members; the Governor-General has the authority to abolish the court, but this is yet to occur.

== Background to establishment of court ==
The Territory of the Cocos (Keeling) Islands consists of approximately 27 coral islands located in the Indian Ocean about 2700 kilometres north-west of Perth, Western Australia. William Keeling discovered the uninhabited Islands in 1609. Alexander Hare first settled them in 1820 with people of Malay origin. In 1827 John Clunies-Ross settled on the Island to harvest coconuts. The Islands are named after the coconut, cocos nucifera. The British Government annexed the Islands in 1857. The Islands became a territory of Australia on 23 November 1955 after having been administered as a dependency of the British Crown Colony of Singapore. As a result of the transfer in 1955, all laws in force before the transfer were to continue except as amended or repealed by Ordinance. The laws inherited have been described as “a complex legal legacy”. They include United Kingdom law, Straits Settlements laws and Singapore laws. Punishments, such as whipping and beating, were still available as options for dealing with criminal offences.

== Establishment of the court ==
The court is established by section 4 of the Supreme Court Ordinance 1955 as the Supreme Court of Cocos. The court has jurisdiction under the Singapore Courts Ordinance. This Ordinance gives it all the jurisdiction which the Supreme Court of the Australian Capital Territory had in 1955. The jurisdiction of the Supreme Court of the Australian Capital Territory is in turn based on the jurisdiction of the Supreme Court of New South Wales that existed on 1 January 1911. The court also had jurisdiction when an applied Singaporean law said that either the Supreme Court of the Straits Settlements (including the High Court of that court or the Court of Appeal of that court), the Supreme Court of the Colony of Singapore (including the High Court, or the Court of Appeal of that Court, or the Court of Criminal Appeal of either the Straits Settlements or of the Colony of Singapore.

The Supreme Court Rules as they existed in the Australian Capital Territory before 23 November 1955 governed the procedure of the Court. This was the date on which the court was established. All cases were to be heard by a single judge without a jury. The Court was to sit principally on the West Island but it could sit anywhere having regard to the interests of justice. The Administrator of the Island is the registrar of the Court. The Administrator is appointed by the Governor-General. One of the difficulties for the Islanders was that there were no resident lawyers on the Island. Coupled with the time difference, it was hard to get timely advice on the legal matters in the territory.

== Notable cases ==
In Clunies-Ross v Totterdell, Justice French of the Federal Court of Australia held that the Bankruptcy Ordinance 1888 of the former Colony of Singapore continued to apply to the Island. As a consequence, the court could assist Singaporean courts in bankruptcy proceedings as the court still had a bankruptcy jurisdiction based on that old law. French J also held that the Bankruptcy Act 1914 (UK) continued to apply to the court. As a result, bankruptcy on the Island could be dealt with under that English law. It was accepted that Australian bankruptcy laws did not apply to the Island and a letter of request was necessary to be issued for Australian laws to apply.

In giving his judgment on the then state of the law, French J said that the laws of the territory could be regarded as “regulated by a system of law which is Byzantine in its complexity”.

== Reform ==
The Australian House of Representatives Standing Committee on Legal and Constitutional Affairs conducted an inquiry into the state of laws in the Island, as well as other Territories under Australian control. In March 1991 it tabled its findings on those legal systems in what is known as the “Islands in the Sun” report. In respect of the Island, it concluded that the laws were a “national disgrace”, and probably breached United Nations standards. The committee recommended that the laws that applied in Western Australia replace the existing legal regime.

== Abolition of the court ==
In 1992 the Australian Parliament passed laws which put into effect the recommendations of the committee. One of the consequences of this change was that courts in Western Australia have undertaken the work of the court under a service delivery arrangement with the Commonwealth Government. The Western Australian Magistrates Court, District Court, Supreme Court, Family Court, Children's Court and Coroner's Court all provide services to the Island as required. As a result, a separate superior court in the territory was no longer necessary.

Those legal changes provide that the Governor-General may abolish the court by way of proclamation on a future date once the last judge of the court retires. (Note: The last judge of the Court appears to have been the Hon. Malcolm Cameron Lee, who resigned as an additional judge of the Supreme Court of the Cocos (Keeling Islands) in 2006. As of February 2019 the Court does not appear to have been formally abolished.)

== Judges of the court ==
Name	Position	From	To	Term	Comments	Notes
Martin Kriewaldt	Judge	23 November 1955	11 June 1960	4 years, 201 days		
Edward Arthur Dunphy	Judge	23 May 1961	31 December 1982	21 years, 222 days	Commonwealth Industrial Court (1956–1982); ACT Supreme Court (1958–1982); Supreme Court of Christmas Island (1961–1982); Supreme Court of Norfolk Island (1969–1982); Court of Appeal of Nauru (1967–1982)	
Sir William Forster	Judge	6 August 1980	30 January 1989	8 years, 177 days		
James Muirhead	Additional Judge	6 August 1980	4 August 1986	5 years, 363 days		
Robert French	Judge	9 May 1989	15 November 2000	11 years, 190 days		
Malcolm Lee	Additional Judge	9 May 1989	1 May 2006	16 years, 357 days		
