= Commonwealth Court of Conciliation and Arbitration =

Australian court (1904 to 1956)

- Established: 1904
- Dissolved: 1956
- Jurisdiction: Australia
- Authorised by: Conciliation and Arbitration Act 1904
- Appeals to: High Court of Australia
- Judge term length: Life

The Commonwealth Court of Conciliation and Arbitration was an Australian court that operated from 1904 to 1956 with jurisdiction to hear and arbitrate interstate industrial disputes, and to make awards. It also had the judicial functions of interpreting and enforcing awards and hearing other criminal and civil cases relating to industrial relations law.

The Court was declared invalid by the High Court of Australia in the Boilermakers' case, and was replaced by two bodies: the Commonwealth Conciliation and Arbitration Commission and the Commonwealth Industrial Court.

== History ==
The Court was created in 1904 by the Commonwealth Conciliation and Arbitration Act 1904, an Act of the Parliament of Australia. The Court was initially less important than the various State industrial conciliation commissions, which had jurisdiction over all disputes which occurred within their respective states. The Court's workload was so low that it made only six awards in the first five years of its existence.

Amendments in 1926 reformed the Court. The changes included replacing the office of President with that of Chief Judge alongside other judges, and ensuring all cases involving the basic or living wage would be heard by a full bench of the Court. The changes also allowed for the appointment of Conciliation Commissioners, with a role similar to mediators. Further changes were made to the Court in 1947 to increase the role of the Commissioners, leaving the judges to conduct the judicial work, and a select few matters of arbitration including the basic wage and the minimum wage for women.

In 1956, the High Court of Australia in the Boilermakers' case held that the Commonwealth Court of Conciliation and Arbitration, as a tribunal exercising the non-judicial power of arbitration, could not also exercise judicial power as a Chapter III Court under the Australian Constitution. The decision has come to stand for the important doctrine of the separation of powers in Australia. The decision effectively rendered the Court defunct.

Following the decision, two new bodies were created to perform the function of the now-defunct Court. The Commonwealth Conciliation and Arbitration Commission was created in 1956 to carry out the non-judicial functions. It was renamed the Australian Conciliation and Arbitration Commission in 1973, the Australian Industrial Relations Commission in 1988, Fair Work Australia in 2010, and the Fair Work Commission in 2012.

The Commonwealth Industrial Court was created to exercise the Court's judicial powers. In 1973 the Industrial Court was renamed the Australian Industrial Court, and in 1977 its functions were transferred to the new Federal Court of Australia.

== Notable decisions ==
One of the Court's early awards was the landmark Harvester case (Ex Parte H.V. McKay of 1907), delivered by Justice H.B. Higgins, which introduced the concept of the living wage into Australian industrial relations. Within 25 years, the concept of a living wage had been extended to most of the Australian workforce, and influenced later decisions establishing certain types of paid leave, and equal pay for indigenous Australians and women. During the Great Depression, the Court reduced wages by 10%.

The Court also decided cases setting the standard working week in Australia. In 1904, the standard working week was 48 hours. In 1930, the Court reduced the working week to 44 hours. In 1947, the Court reduced the working week to 40 hours in a case that took two years to hear.

== List of presidents and judges ==
| Position | Name | Appointment commenced | Appointment ended | Term in office | Comments | Notes |
|---|---|---|---|---|---|---|
| President | Richard O'Connor | 10 February 1905 | 13 September 1907 | 2 years, 215 days | Judge of the High Court | |
| President | H. B. Higgins | 14 September 1907 | 29 June 1921 | 13 years, 288 days | Judge of the High Court | |
| President | Charles Powers | 30 June 1921 | 25 June 1926 | 4 years, 360 days | Judge of the High Court | |
| Chief Judge | George Dethridge | 20 July 1926 | 29 December 1938 | 12 years, 162 days | | |
| Chief Judge | George Beeby | 15 March 1939 | 31 July 1941 | 2 years, 138 days | | |
| Chief Judge | Harold Piper | 1 August 1941 | 16 June 1947 | 5 years, 319 days | | |
| Chief Judge | Edmund Drake-Brockman | 17 June 1947 | 1 June 1949 | 1 year, 359 days | | |
| Chief Judge | Sir Raymond Kelly | 30 June 1949 | 25 July 1956 | 7 years, 25 days | | |
| Deputy President | Charles Powers | 10 October 1914 | 30 April 1920 | 5 years, 203 days | Judge of the High Court | |
| Deputy President | Sir John Quick | 26 June 1922 | 25 March 1930 | 16 years, 10 days | | |
| Deputy President | Noel Webb | 26 June 1922 | 12 February 1927 | 4 years, 231 days | | |
| Judge | Lionel Lukin | 20 July 1926 | 6 July 1938 | 11 years, 351 days | | |
| Judge | George Beeby | 21 July 1926 | 31 July 1941 | 15 years, 10 days | | |
| Judge | Edmund Drake-Brockman | 18 April 1927 | 1 June 1949 | 22 years, 44 days | | |
| Judge | Harold Piper | 15 February 1938 | 16 June 1947 | 9 years, 121 days | | |
| Judge | Thomas O'Mara | 15 March 1939 | 14 October 1946 | 7 years, 213 days | | |
| Judge | Sir Raymond Kelly | 15 August 1941 | 25 July 1956 | 14 years, 345 days | | |
| Judge | Alfred Foster | 12 October 1944 | 26 November 1962 (Note: Appointed for life and so maintained appointment as a judge even though the Court ceased to sit after 1956. The Court was only abolished after the retirement of its last member, Sir Richard Kirby in 1973.) | 18 years, 45 days | Deputy President of the Commonwealth Conciliation and Arbitration Commission | |
| Judge | Bernard Sugerman | 15 April 1946 | 9 September 1947 | 1 year, 147 days | Resigned to take up appointment with NSW Supreme Court | |
| Judge | Sir Richard Kirby | 26 August 1947 | 1973 | 25–26 years | First President of the Commonwealth Conciliation and Arbitration Commission | |
| Judge | Edward Dunphy | 27 April 1949 | 15 August 1956 | 7 years, 110 days | Appointed to the Commonwealth Industrial Court | |
| Judge | Sydney Wright | 14 December 1950 | 1970 | 19–20 years | Deputy President of the Commonwealth Conciliation and Arbitration Commission | |
| Judge | Malcolm McIntyre | 4 July 1952 | 21 September 1953 | 1 year, 79 days | | |
| Judge | Sir Edward Morgan | 4 August 1952 | 15 August 1956 | 4 years, 11 days | Appointed to the Commonwealth Industrial Court | |
| Judge | Richard Ashburner | 1 February 1954 | 1963 | 8–9 years | Deputy President of the Commonwealth Conciliation and Arbitration Commission | |
