= Phillip Evatt =

Australian jurist

The Honourable Phillip Evatt DSC

Judge of the Federal Court of Australia
- In office 1 February 1977 – 28 February 1987

Personal details
- Born: 2 July 1922 North Sydney, New South Wales
- Died: 20 March 2010 (aged 87) Bathurst, New South Wales
- Education: University of Sydney
- Occupation: Jurist

Military service
- Allegiance: Australia
- Branch/service: Royal Australian Naval Volunteer Reserve
- Years of service: 1940–1946
- Rank: Lieutenant
- Battles/wars: Second World War
- Awards: Distinguished Service Cross

Phillip George Evatt, DSC (2 July 1922 – 20 March 2010) was an Australian naval officer and jurist who serviced as a judge on the Federal Court of Australia from 1977 to 1987. Evatt received a Bachelor of Laws from the University of Sydney. He served as lieutenant in the Royal Australian Navy from 1940 to 1946, including on the British submarine HMS Tapir. He was awarded the Distinguished Service Cross for his part in the sinking of German submarine U-486 in 1945. Evatt was admitted as a barrister in New South Wales in 1951. During his career as a jurist, he served on several courts, including the Supreme Court of the Northern Territory (1976–1987), the Supreme Court of the Australian Capital Territory (1974–1987), and the Supreme Court of Norfolk Island (1981–1987). Evatt presided over a Royal Commission into the use of chemical agents in the Vietnam War.
