= Terence Higgins (judge) =

Australian judge

The Hon. Honorary Air Commodore Terence John Higgins AO KC (born 1943) is an Australian-born judge of the National and Supreme Courts of Papua New Guinea, and a former Chief Justice of the Supreme Court of the Australian Capital Territory.

== Early years ==
Higgins was born in 1943 in Hobart, Tasmania. He was educated at St Augustines Christian Brothers College in Yarraville, Victoria, and subsequently at St Edmund's College in Canberra. He undertook tertiary studies at the Australian National University, Canberra soon after it separated from the University of Melbourne. He received the George Knowles Memorial Prize at the Australian National University in 1962 and qualified with honours on his law degree. In 1966, he married Anne Binnie.

After leaving university, he took articles in the Canberra firm of J J O’Neill Solicitors. On completion of his articles, he was admitted as a barrister and solicitor of the Supreme Court of the Australian Capital Territory in 1967. He remained there until he became a partner in the law firm Higgins Faulks & Martin. He was a partner there until 1984. The firm later was renamed Higgins Solicitors. During his time as a solicitor, he was a member of the Council of the Law Society of the Australian Capital Territory between 1973 and 1983.

In 1984, Higgins moved to sole practice at the bar as a barrister. He was also admitted as a barrister in the Supreme Court of New South Wales in 1984, and as a barrister in the Supreme Court of Victoria in 1986, as each State of Australia had separate admission rules for barristers at the time. He served on the National Executive of the Australian Labor Party between 1986 and 1987. He was appointed as a King's Counsel in 1987. He served from 1988 until 1990 as Vice President of the Australian Capital Territory Bar Association. He was also a member of the Australian Capital Territory Gaming and Liquor Authority from 1987 to 1990 during that time.

== Judicial appointment ==
Higgins was appointed as a resident judge of the Supreme Court of the Australian Capital Territory in 1990, replacing Justice John Anthony Kelly QC. He was also commissioned as a judge of the Federal Court of Australia. He is probably the last judge to hold both commissions. He was the Chairman of SEC Board from 1990 to 2003. He chaired the Community Law Reform Committee of the Australian Capital Territory from 1994 to 1996. He was also the National President of the Royal Life Saving Society of Australia from 1997 to 2003. He has served on the Australian Defence Force's Health Research Committee (formerly called the Australian Defence Forces Medical Ethics Committee) since 1993.

Higgins was appointed as Chief Justice of the Supreme Court of the Australian Capital Territory on 31 January 2003. He left the court on 13 September 2013. In March 2015 he was appointed as a judge of the National and Supreme Courts of Papua New Guinea.

Higgins has delivered speeches at the National Press Club, the International Criminal Law Congress, the Australian Judicial Conference and given the Sir Richard Blackburn Lecture in 2006.

== Notable cases ==
One case which attracted media attention was Costello v Random House Australia Pty Ltd and Abbott v Random House Australia Pty Ltd. In that case, the defendant published a book titled Goodbye Jerusalem: Night Thoughts of a Labour Outsider, a book written by Bob Ellis. The book included various allegations against a number of Australian political figures. Two of those figures were Peter Costello and Tony Abbott, members of the Australian Liberal Party. Ellis recounted an alleged conversation with Rodney Cavalier in which Cavalier was alleged to have stated that Abbott and Costello had been members of the right wing of the Australian Labor Party, and that both had changed political allegiances to the Liberal Party for sexual favours. Further allegations were made against each of their wives as well. The publisher could not produce evidence proving the truth of the allegations and conceded at the trial that each of the allegations were false, eventually recalling the book from sale, but not before 40% of the print run had been sold. Higgins heard the defamation claim in October and November 1998 and delivered his judgment in March 1999. Higgins upheld the plaintiffs’ claims for defamation and awarded damages against the publisher.

In May 2002, Higgins heard a defamation case brought by Richard Carleton against television broadcaster Australian Broadcasting Corporation. In this action, Carleton alleged that the corporation imputed that Carleton was guilty of "lazy journalism". This was in relation to a documentary produced by Carleton about the 1995 massacre of Muslims at Srebrenica, Bosnia. The Media Watch program produced by the corporation alleged that the program was inspired by an earlier BBC program entitled “A Cry From the Grave”, but for which no credit was given. During evidence before Higgins, Carleton who was watching the Media Watch program, gave evidence that he threw the glass of scotch he had been drinking at the television in disgust.

In his judgement delivered on 18 December 2002, Higgins found that the defendant’s publication conveyed the imputations of “plagiarism” and “lazy journalism”. Higgins in his judgment found that "the 60 Minutes program was not plagiarized from the BBC program". However, Carleton’s claim was dismissed as the imputations were found to be fair comment, notwithstanding that they weren’t true. In dismissing the claim, Higgins said:

“I am obliged to deny them damages, rightly so, as the defendants' freedom of speech, protected by fair comment, allows them to have published their opinions, however wrongheaded and prejudiced, without legal penalty. But that leaves the plaintiffs who have been falsely accused of plagiarism with no legal remedy. They have, by reason of my findings, vindicated their reputations, at least in my opinion. This is not a just result but it is the only conclusion to which I can come.”

On 26 April 2016 Higgins was among the five Justices of the Supreme Court of Papua New Guinea who unanimously ruled that the Manus Regional Processing Centre breached the PNG constitution's right to personal liberty, and was thus illegal.

== Sources ==
- Federal Court of Australia - http://www.fedcourt.gov.au/aboutct/higgins.html
- Supreme Court of the Australian Capital Territory http://webarchive.loc.gov/all/20090520151911/http%3A//www.courts.act.gov.au/supreme/content/higgins_cj.asp?textonly%3Dno
- Annual Report, ADHREC 2002. http://www.defence.gov.au/dpe/dhs/research/adhrec/reports/ADHREC_AnnualRep_2002.pdf
- Who’s Who Australia
- Richard George Carleton v Australian Broadcasting Corp [2002] ACTSC 127
- Costello v Random House Australia Pty Ltd and Abbott v Random House Australia Pty Ltd. (1999) ACTSC 013
