= Edward Arthur Dunphy =

Australian barrister and federal judge (1907–1989)

Hon. Edward Arthur Dunphy QC (18 June 1907—26 January 1989) was a justice within the Australian federal court system.

Dunphy was born 18 June 1907 in Perth, Western Australia, the son of William Henry Dunphy, and was educated at the Christian Brothers' College, Perth. He married Ethel Marshall Nunn on 19 December 1935, and they were the parents of two sons and three daughters. He was admitted to the Bar in 1932, was Western Australia's Crown Solicitor in May 1938 until September 1945 and appointed as a King's Counsel in 1944, and it was believed that he was then the youngest KC in Australia. In 1949, he was appointed to the Industrial Court and sat on the 1950 Basic Wage case, which made the decision to award a £1 a week pay rise which broke the barrier of £10 a week. and proceeded to sit on a succession of other courts within the federal and territorial jurisdictions until 1983.

Dunphy was the sole remaining judge of the Industrial Court which was disbanded and duties taken over by the industrial edition of the Federal Court. He gained some notoriety towards the end of his judicial career for not bending to political will for him to retire when past seventy years of age, following the passing of the 1977 referendum on judicial retirement age. He remained a judge appointed for life, though it was stated by the government it was unable to appoint him to another court due his being past the designated retirement age, a claim that Dunphy rejected, saying that other judges over 70 had already been appointed to other courts. He retired from the bench in 1983, and died in 1989.

== Judicial appointments ==
- President of the Arbitration Court of Western Australia from September 1945 – 1949, with status of Supreme Court judge
- Member of the Courts Marine Inquiry from 1963 to 1983
- Member of the Land and Valuation Tribunal of the Northern Territory from 1964 to 1983
- Justice of the Commonwealth Court of Conciliation and Arbitration from 1949 to 1956.
- Justice of the Commonwealth Industrial Court from 1956 to 1983.
- Justice of the Supreme Court of the Australian Capital Territory from 1958 to 1983
- Justice of the Supreme Court of Christmas Island and the Supreme Court of the Cocos (Keeling) Islands from 1961 to 1983
- Justice of the Supreme Court of Norfolk Island from 1970 to 1983.
- Judge of the Court of Appeal of Nauru from 1967 to 1983
