= ANU Law School =

Law faculty of the Australian National University

Coordinates: 35.281°S 149.119°E

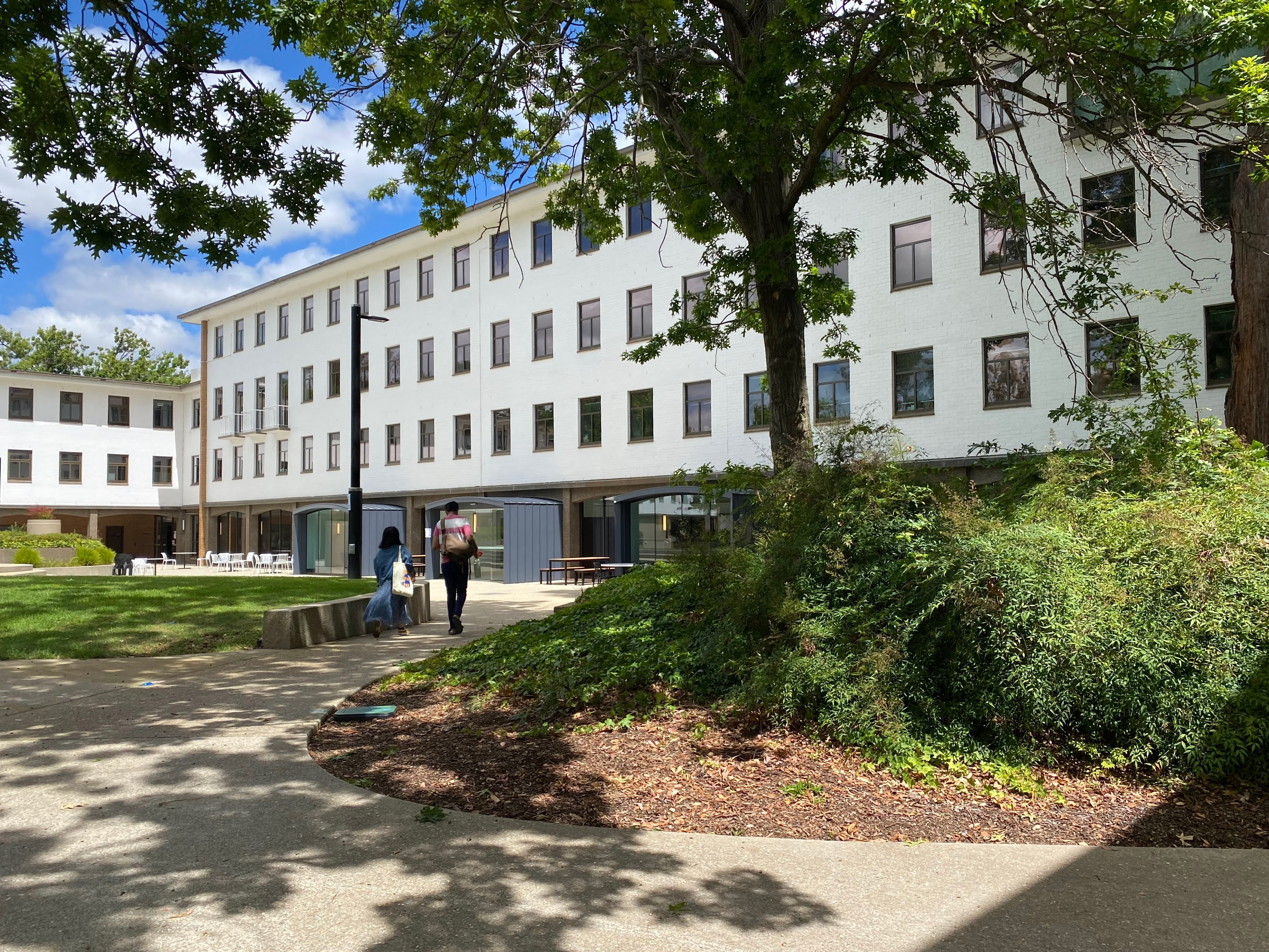
- Type: Public
- Established: 1960 (as the Faculty of Law)
- Head: Ryan Goss
- Administrative staff: Around 130, including support staff and visiting fellows
- Students: 1,400 annual intake of about 300
- Location: Canberra, Australian Capital Territory, Australia
- Campus: Urban
- Website: http://law.anu.edu.au

The ANU Law School at the Australian National University is the National Law School within the ANU College of Law, Governance & Policy, one of the six academic Colleges of the ANU. It is located in Canberra, the capital of Australia. This provides the School with opportunities to connect with the work of the Parliament of Australia, the High Court of Australia, the departments and agencies of the Federal Government, as well as the local ACT law-making institutions – the Legislative Assembly and the ACT courts.

The ANU Law School is a premier law school in Australia. It is ranked 2nd nationally and equal 21st in the world according to the 2024 THE World University Rankings by Subject.

The current Head of School is Ryan Goss.

== History ==
The School was established in 1960 as the Faculty of Law.

== Students ==
The Australian National University Law Students' Society (ANU LSS) was established in 1963, which is one of the largest and most active societies at the university. The ANU LSS provide a wide range of social, educational and careers-oriented programs and events for students studying at the ANU Law School.

In 1972, Australian National University law students founded the ANU Law Revue. The ANU Law Revue (also known as "the Sullivans") is the longest running student revue at the Australian National University, featuring annual productions of original sketch comedy and parody songs.

== Student traditions ==
The ANU Law School Library features a bronze bust of Sir Robert Garran, who was incidentally its first honorary doctorate. The bust was gifted to the Australian National University in 1952. There is a tradition amongst ANU law students that rubbing the nose of Sir Robert Garran's bust will bring them good luck, something also noted in a Geoffrey Sawer Lecture on Sir Robert Garran's life by now High Court of Australia Chief Justice Stephen Gageler.

The ANU LSS has a magazine called Peppercorn Magazine, which was founded in the 1969. In August 2023, the ANU LSS launched the 'Peppercorn Pedestal', featuring a dried black peppercorn on a small velvet pillow in celebration of the various student traditions involving a Peppercorn (law) at the ANU Law School.

The ANU Law School Library houses historical desks that are adorned in decades-old graffiti from ANU law students, featuring political statements, cartoons, poetry and many other artistic forms.

== Faculty and services ==
The ANU Law School is home to numerous internationally-regarded researchers and practitioners, and offers a range of undergraduate and postgraduate law programs.

The Law School publishes the Federal Law Review and Australian Year Book of International Law.

In addition to its academic programme, the law school promotes a range of co-curricular activities including mooting, negotiation and client interview competitions, membership of the Federal Law Review student editor board, and The ANU Law Revue. The College has been the world champion team in the Philip C. Jessup International Law Moot Court Competition two times, in 1981 and 2010, and runner up once, in 1998.

== Notable alumni ==
=== Judges ===
- Robert Beech-Jones, Justice of the High Court of Australia since 2023, former Justice of the Supreme Court of New South Wales, appointed 2012. Chief Justice of the Supreme Court of New South Wales Common Law Division and Justice of the New South Wales Court of Appeal, 2021-2023.
- Stephen Gageler, Justice of the High Court of Australia since 2012, Solicitor-General of Australia 2008–2012
- Peter Buchanan, former Justice of the Supreme Court of Victoria (8 September 2006 - 9 September 2016)
- Terence Higgins, former Chief Justice of the Supreme Court of the Australian Capital Territory (2 July 1990 - 30 January 2003)
- Geoff Lindsay, Judge of the Supreme Court of New South Wales, appointed 6 August 2012.
- John Pascoe, AO, CVO, former Chief Judge of the Federal Circuit Court of Australia (13 October 2017 – 9 December 2018) and Deputy Chancellor of the University of New South Wales
- Rachel Pepper (judge), NSW Land and Environment Court, appointed 1 May 2009.
- Richard Refshauge, Acting Judge of the Australian Capital Territory Drug and Alcohol Court since 2020, former Justice of the Supreme Court of the Australian Capital Territory (2008-2017), former Director of Public Prosecutions of the Australian Capital Territory (1998-2008)
- Alan Robertson SC, former Judge of the Federal Court of Australia (2011-2020)
- James Stevenson, Judge of the Supreme Court of New South Wales, appointed 1 February 2012.
- Louise Taylor (jurist), Magistrate of the Australian Capital Territory since 2018, and the ACT's first Aboriginal judicial officer.
- Tony Whitlam, former Justice of the Federal Court of Australia (1 January 1993 -1 May 2005)

=== Legal practitioners ===
- Posesi Bloomfield (born 1974), former Attorney General of the Republic of the Marshall Islands
- Tupou Draunidalo, Fijian Lawyer
- David Risstrom, barrister
- Jennifer Robinson, human rights and WikiLeaks lawyer, Rhodes Scholar 2006

=== Law professors ===
- Thomas Faunce, professor at ANU College of Law and ANU Medical School (2006-2019)
- Jeremy Gans, professor at Melbourne Law School, expert in criminal law and animal law, and prominent Twitter personality
- Mark Nolan SFHEA, professor at ANU College of Law (2002-2020), Director of the Centre for Law and Justice, Charles Stuart University
- Jane Stapleton, Emerita professor at the [ANU College of Law], E.E. Smith Professor at Texas, Austin, 38th Master of Christ's College, Cambridge (2016–present)
- James Stellios FAAL, professor at the ANU College of Law, constitutional law expert, barrister
- Phillipa Weeks, professor at ANU College of Law (-2006), expert in labour law
- Fiona Wheeler FAAL, emerita professor at ANU College of Law, expert in constitutional law
- George Williams, professor at the UNSW Faculty of Law, constitutional law expert

=== Politics and government ===
- Concetta Fierravanti-Wells, Senator for New South Wales
- Margaret Guilfoyle AC DBE, former Senator for Victoria
- John Hannaford, former New South Wales Government Minister
- Bob Hawke, 23rd Prime Minister of Australia
- Gary Humphries, former Senator for the Australian Capital Territory
- Kate Jones, former Queensland Government Minister
- Joe Ludwig, Senator for Queensland
- John McMillan AO, Australian Information Commissioner
- Brett Mason, Senator for Queensland
- Nick Minchin, former Senator for South Australia
- Simon Overland APM, Tasmanian Justice Department Secretary, 23rd Chief Commissioner of Victoria Police
- Shane Rattenbury, Member of the ACT Legislative Assembly
- Warwick Smith AM, former Member of the Australian Parliament
- Jon Stanhope, former Chief Minister of the ACT, Administrator of the Australian Indian Ocean Territories
- Shane Stone AC, QC, 5th Chief Minister of the Northern Territory
- Feleti Teo OBE, former Secretary General of the Pacific Islands Forum
- Andrew Tink, former Member of the Legislative Assembly of New South Wales
- Tony Whitlam QC, former Member of the Australian Parliament, former judge
- Peter Woolcott, Australian diplomat

=== Other ===
- James Popple FAAL, CEO of the Law Council of Australia
- Stephen Rice, journalist
- Tim Rogers, musician
- Anu Singh, criminal
- Graham Tuckwell, Founder and Chairman of ETF Securities Limited
- Jack Waterford AM, Editor-at-Large of The Canberra Times

== See also ==
- Priestley 11
