= Bloomfield (surname) =

Bloomfield is a surname. Notable people with the surname include:

- Allen J. Bloomfield (1883–1932), American politician from New York
- Angela Bloomfield (born 1972), New Zealand actor and director
- April Bloomfield (born 1974), English chef
- Ashley Bloomfield (born 1966), New Zealand public health official
- Benjamin Bloomfield, 1st Baron Bloomfield (1768–1846), Private Secretary to the Sovereign
- Clara D. Bloomfield (1942–2020), American physician-researcher
- Clarence Bloomfield Moore (1852–1936), American archaeologist
- Debra Bloomfield (born 1952), American photographer
- Fannie Bloomfield Zeisler (1863–1927), Austrian-born U.S. pianist
- Harry Bloomfield (1883–1950), Australian rugby league footballer
- Jack Bloomfield (1889–1961), English professional boxer
- Jack Bloomfield (baseball) (1930–2025), American baseball player
- Janet Bloomfield (1953–2007), peace and disarmament campaigner
- Jimmy Bloomfield (1934–1983), English football player and manager
- John Bloomfield, 2nd Baron Bloomfield (1802–1879), British diplomat and peer
- Joseph Bloomfield (1753–1823), Governor of New Jersey
- Kenneth Bloomfield (1931–2025), former head of the Northern Ireland Civil Service
- Leonard Bloomfield (1887–1949), American linguist
- Lou Bloomfield (born 1956), American physics professor
- Lynvale Bloomfield (1959–2019), Jamaican doctor and politician
- Matt Bloomfield (born 1984), English professional footballer
- Maurice Bloomfield (1855–1928), American philologist and Sanskrit scholar
- Meyer Bloomfield (1878–1938), Romanian-American lawyer and social worker
- Michael J. Bloomfield (born 1959), American astronaut
- Mike Bloomfield (1943–1981), American guitarist
- Olivia Bloomfield, Baroness Bloomfield of Hinton Waldrist (born 1960), British political party executive
- Posesi Bloomfield (born 1974), Marshallese politician
- Richard Bloomfield (born 1983), English professional tennis player
- Robert Bloomfield (1766–1823), English poet
- Robert Lee Bloomfield (1827–1916), American businessman
- Rob Bloomfield (born 1977), British musician & music producer
- Samuel Thomas Bloomfield (1783–1869), scholar, textual critic
- Theodore Bloomfield (1923–1998), conductor
- Timothy Bloomfield (born 1973), English cricketer
- William Anderson Bloomfield (1873–1954), Scottish recipient of the Victoria Cross
- William Swanson Read Bloomfield (1885–1969), New Zealand architect

== See also ==
- Baron Bloomfield, a title in the Peerage of Ireland
- Broomfield (surname)
