= Broomfield (surname) =

Broomfield is a surname. Notable people with the surname include:

- Ayan Broomfield (born 1997), Canadian tennis player
- Billy Broomfield (born 1945), American politician
- Deon Broomfield (born 1991), American football player
- Fred J. Broomfield (1860–1941), English-born Australian writer
- Herbert Broomfield (1878–unknown), English footballer
- Jack Broomfield (1865–1927), African-American community leader in the early 20th century
- Jody Broomfield (born 1976), Canadian artist
- John Broomfield (1889–1981), Canadian politician
- John Calvin Broomfield (1872–1950), Bishop of the Methodist Protestant Church in the United States
- Matthew Broomfield (fl. 1550), Welsh poet
- Maurice Broomfield (1916–2010), British industrial photographer
- Nick Broomfield (born 1948), English documentary filmmaker
- Nigel Broomfield (1937–2018), British ambassador
- Robert C. Broomfield (1933–2014), United States judge
- William Broomfield (1922–2019), American politician

== See also ==
- Bloomfield (surname)
