= Cheryl Saunders =

Australian academic and international and constitutional law researcher

Cheryl Saunders AO FASSA FAAL FBA
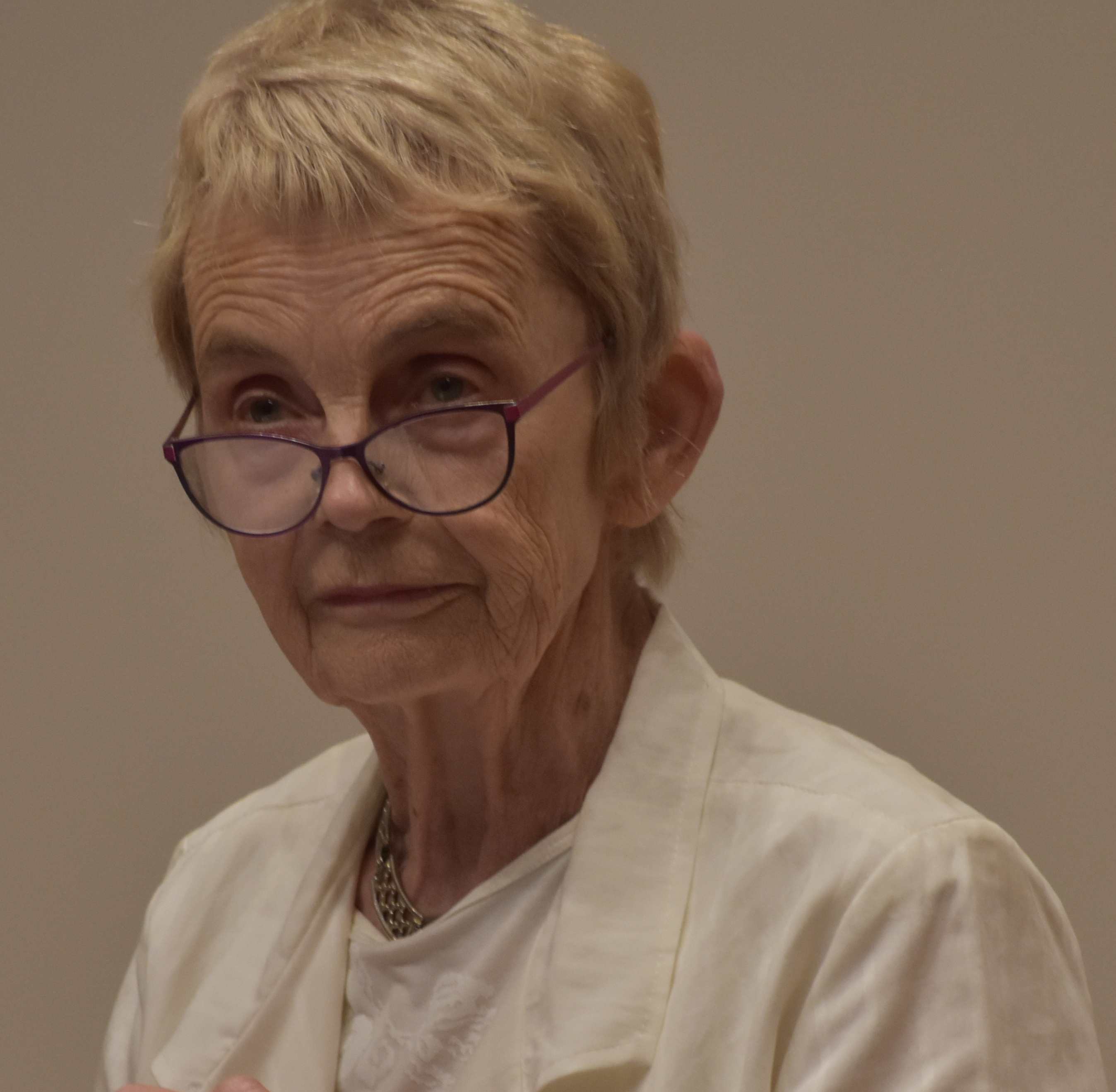
- Saunders in 2025 at Trinity College
- Born: 28 August 1944 (age 82); Quetta (Pakistan)
- Occupation: Academic

Academic work
- Discipline: Law
- Sub-discipline: Australian law Public law

Cheryl Anne Saunders (born 28 August 1944) is an Australian legal academic. She is a Laureate Professor Emeritus at the University of Melbourne.

== Career ==
Saunders was the first woman to be appointed as a professor in the Law Faculty at University of Melbourne. She was also a founding director of its Centre for Comparative Constitutional Studies.

She has been awarded several honours in recognition of her work. In 1994 she was appointed an officer of the Order of Australia "for service to the law and to public administration" and in 2003 she received the Centenary Medal. In 2005 the University of Cordoba conferred an honorary doctorate on Saunders. She was elected to the Legion of Honour in France for her services to the Académie Internationale de Droit Constitutionnel in 2009. Saunders is a Fellow of the Academy of Social Sciences in Australia and a Foundation Fellow of the Australian Academy of Law. She was elected as a Fellow of the British Academy in July 2018. In 2022 she was awarded the Tang Prize in the category "Rule of Law".
