= Baroness Bloomfield =

Baroness Bloomfield may refer to:

- Georgiana Bloomfield, Baroness Bloomfield (1822–1905), British courtier and author
- Olivia Bloomfield, Baroness Bloomfield of Hinton Waldrist (born 1960), British life peer
