= Charles Stuart, 1st Baron Stuart de Rothesay =

British diplomat (1779–1845)

The Right Honourable The Lord Stuart de Rothesay GCB PC
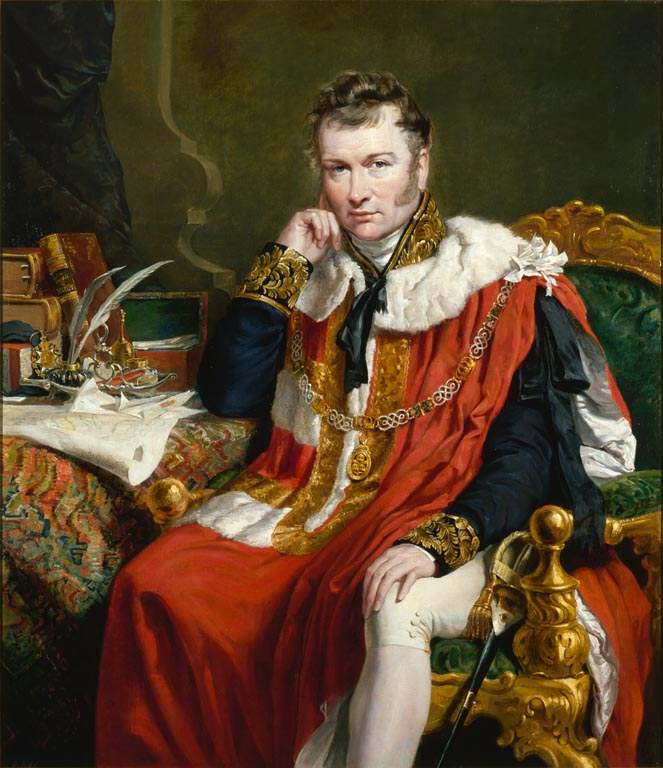
- Portrait by George Hayter, 1830

British Ambassador to Russia
- In office 1841–1844
- Preceded by: The Marquess of Clanricarde
- Succeeded by: John Bloomfield

British Ambassador to France
- In office 1828–1830
- Preceded by: The Viscount Granville
- Succeeded by: The Viscount Granville
- In office 1815–1824
- Preceded by: The Duke of Wellington
- Succeeded by: The Viscount Granville

British Ambassador to Portugal
- In office 1810–1814
- Preceded by: John Villiers
- Succeeded by: Thomas Sydenham

Personal details
- Born: 2 January 1779
- Died: 6 November 1845 (aged 66) Highcliffe Castle, Dorset, England
- Spouse: Lady Elizabeth Margaret Yorke
- Relations: Sir Charles Stuart (father); John Stuart, 3rd Earl of Bute (grandfather)
- Education: Christ Church, Oxford
- Occupation: Diplomat

Arms of Charles Stuart, 1st Baron Stuart de Rothesay: Or, a fess chequy azure and argent within a double tressure flory counterflory, a mullet for difference gules.

Charles Stuart, 1st Baron Stuart de Rothesay, GCB, PC (2 January 1779 – 6 November 1845), known as Sir Charles Stuart between 1812 and 1828, was a British diplomat. He was twice Ambassador to France and also served as Ambassador to Russia between 1841 and 1844.

== Background and education ==
Stuart was the son of the Lieutenant-General The Honourable Sir Charles Stuart, younger son of Prime-Minister John Stuart, 3rd Earl of Bute. His mother was Louisa Bertie, daughter of Lord Vere Bertie, younger son of Robert Bertie, 1st Duke of Ancaster and Kesteven. He was educated at Eton and Christ Church, Oxford.

== Diplomatic career ==
Stuart joined the Diplomatic Service in 1801, and was immediately appointed as Secretary of Legation in Vienna, Holy Roman Empire, a post he held until 1804. He was then sent to Petersburg and this was followed by an assignment in French occupied Spain in 1808. He served as Envoy Extraordinary and Minister Plenipotentiary to Portugal and Brazil between 1810 and 1814.

He was appointed a Knight of the Most Honourable Order of the Bath (KB) in 1812 and sworn of the Privy Council in 1814.

In December 1814 Henry Brougham described Stuart to Thomas Creevey:

He is a plain man, of some prejudices, caring little for politics and of very good practical sense... He has no very violent passions or acute feelings about him, and likes to go quietly on and enjoy himself in his way. He has read a great deal and seen much more, and done, for his standing. more business than any diplomatic man I ever heard of... He has no nonsense in his composition, and is a strictly honorable man, and one over whom nobody will ever acquire the slightest influence...

Briefly Ambassador to the Netherlands between February and May 1815, it was during his posting as Ambassador in Spain that Stuart became indispensable to the Duke of Wellington. At the Generals' insistence, he was appointed British Ambassador to France. During Napoleon's Hundred Days, he left Paris and was in Brussels at the start of the Waterloo Campaign, where during his stay he attended the Duchess of Richmond's Ball. After the fall of Napoleon, he escorted the exiled French King Louis XVIII back to Paris, and became British Ambassador there until 1824. In 1815 he was made a Knight-Grand-Cross in the civil division of the Most Honourable Order of the Bath (GCB).

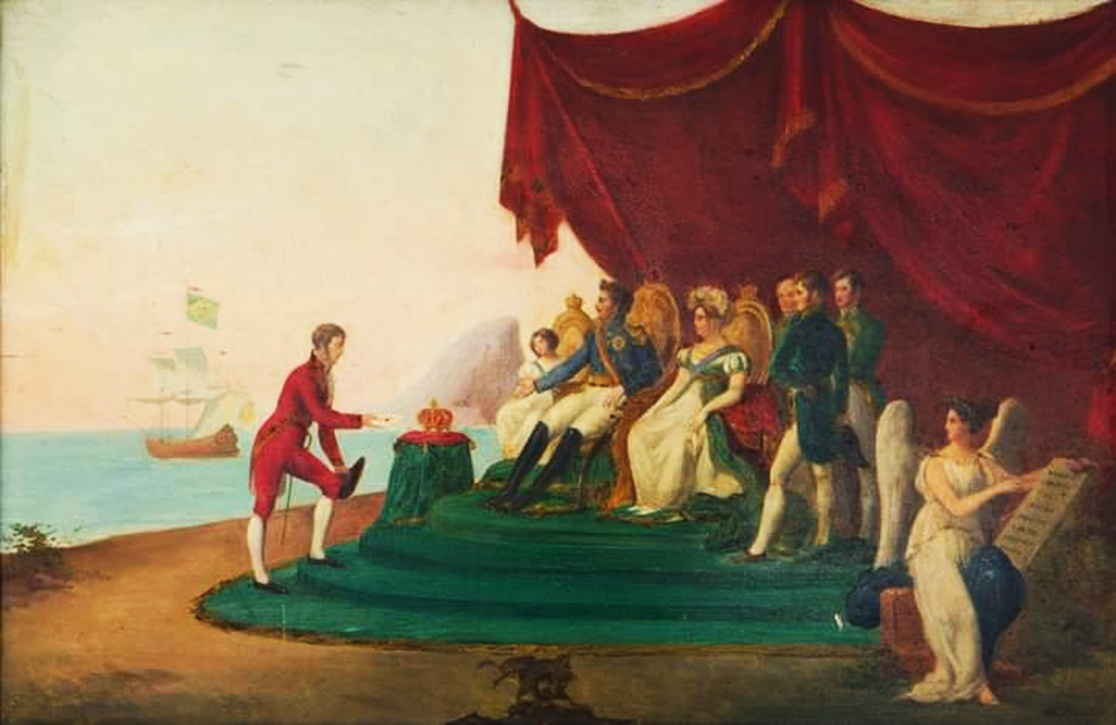
Allegory of the recognition of the Empire of Brazil and its independence. The painting depicts Stuart presenting his letter of credence to Emperor Pedro I, who is flanked by his wife Maria Leopoldina, their daughter Maria da Glória (later Queen of Portugal as Maria II), and other dignitaries. At right, a winged figure, representing History, carving the "great event" on a stone tablet.

From 1825 to 1826 he was once more Envoy Extraordinary and Minister Plenipotentiary to Portugal and Brazil. In 1825 the Portuguese King John VI named Stuart his plenipotentiary with powers to negotiate and sign with Brazil a Treaty on the recognition of that country's independence. Invested with those powers, Stuart signed the treaty recognising Brazilian independence on 29 August 1825, and on 15 November of the same year the Portuguese King ratified the treaty. He was then created 1st Count of o Machico by Decree of 22 November 1825 by John VI of Portugal and later 1st Marquess of Angra by Decree of 1 May 1826 by Maria II of Portugal, then still in Brazil, and was created the 5th Grand-Cross of the Portuguese Ancient and Very Noble Order of the Tower and Sword, of the Valour, Loyalty and Merit.

In January 1828 he was once again appointed Ambassador to France and was raised to the Peerage of Great Britain and Ireland as Baron Stuart de Rothesay, of the Isle of Bute, at the same time. He continued as Ambassador to France until November 1830. In 1841 he was made Ambassador to Russia, a post he held until 1844.

== Personal life ==
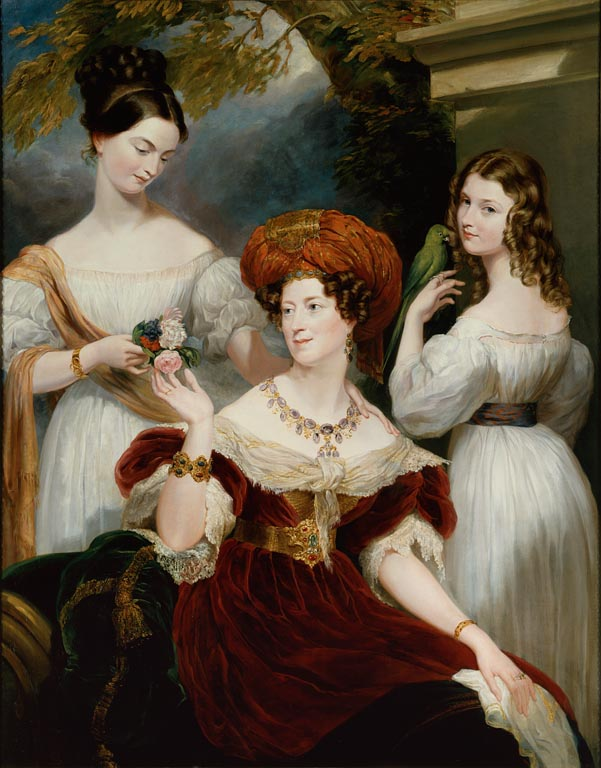
Stuart's wife Elizabeth, Lady Stuart de Rothesay, and daughters Charlotte (later Countess Canning) and Louisa (later Marchioness of Waterford), painted in Paris by George Hayter, 1830.

Lord Stuart de Rothesay married Lady Elizabeth Margaret, daughter of Philip Yorke, 3rd Earl of Hardwicke, on 6 February 1816. They had two daughters:

- Hon. Charlotte Stuart (1817–1861), wife of Charles Canning, 1st Earl Canning.
- Hon. Louisa Anne Stuart (1818–1891), wife of Henry Beresford, 3rd Marquess of Waterford.

=== Highcliffe Castle ===
Early retirement from the diplomatic service allowed him to start on a project to build a new family home. By 1830 he had purchased much of the eastern end of the estate, at Highcliffe, Dorset. Highcliffe had previously been owned by his forebears, although the estate had been sold by his father.

Stuart engaged William Donthorne, a founder member of the Royal Institute of British Architects, to design a new Highcliffe Castle. The castle is built on an L-shaped plan, oriented on a south-east axis. An oriel window is central on the south east elevation, providing a vista across the landscaped gardens to a panorama of The Needles and Isle of Wight. Carved medieval stonework from the Norman benedictine Abbey St Peter at Jumieges and from the Manoir de Radeval or Grand Maison of Les Andelys, was used in the building of the house. Both of these buildings had fallen into disrepair after the French Revolution. A 16th-century oriel window and a stained glass window are among the castle's other notable architectural features.

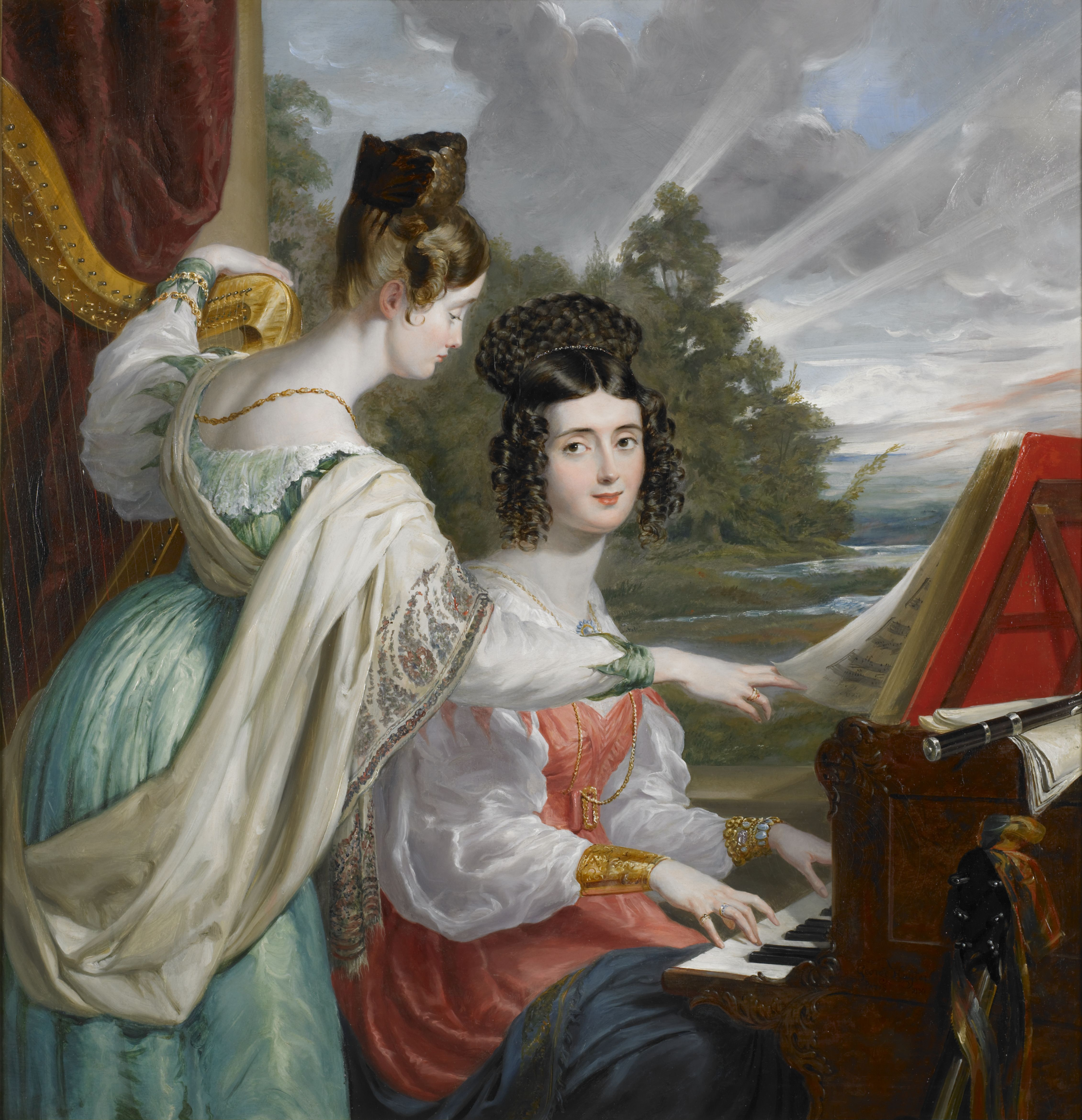
Another portrait of Lord Stuart de Rothesay's daughters by Sir George Hayter, Paris 1830

== Later life ==
After the Castle was completed, Charles became Ambassador to Russia in 1841. However ill-health caused his return to England and he died at Highcliffe in November 1845, aged 66, when the barony became extinct. He was buried at St Mark's Church, Highcliffe and his memorial can still be seen there. Lady Stuart de Rothesay remained a widow until her death in June 1867.

Diplomatic posts
Preceded by Hon. John Villiers	Envoy Extraordinary and Minister Plenipotentiary to Portugal and Brazil; 1810–1814	Succeeded by Thomas Sydenham
Preceded by The Duke of Wellington	British Ambassador to France; 1815–1824	Succeeded by The Viscount Granville
Preceded by The Viscount Granville	British Ambassador to France; 1828–1830	Succeeded by The Viscount Granville
Preceded by The Marquess of Clanricarde	British Ambassador to Russia; 1841–1844	Succeeded by Hon. John Bloomfield
