= Methodist Protestant Church =

Methodist denomination in the U.S.

- Classification: Methodism
- Orientation: Holiness movement
- Theology: Wesleyan
- Associations: American Council of Christian Churches, International Council of Christian Churches
- Founder: John Wesley
- Origin: 1828
- Separated from: Methodist Episcopal Church (1828)
- Congregations: 42
- Official website: themethodistprotestantchurch.org

The Methodist Protestant Church (MPC) is a Methodist denomination of Christianity that is based in the United States. It was formed in 1828 by former members of the Methodist Episcopal Church, being Wesleyan in doctrine and worship, but adopting congregational governance.

A majority of the Methodist Protestants merged with the Methodist Episcopal Church in 1939, and for that reason, the historic Methodist Protestant Church is regarded as one of the predecessors of the present-day United Methodist Church. The Mississippi MPC delegation to the 1939 Uniting Conference withdrew from the proceedings, due to worries about developing liberal elements within the UMC; most of the congregations in the Mississippi conference reorganized and continued as the Methodist Protestant Church in name, doctrine and practice.

In 2024, the MPC headquarters are in Mississippi.

As of 2008, the MPC consists of 42 churches in the United States, located in Alabama, Arkansas, Louisiana, Mississippi, and Oklahoma and a mission conference in the country of Belize.

== History ==
=== A Methodist reform movement begins ===
The particular issue which would eventually give rise to the organization of the Methodist Protestant Church was one of Church governance rather than doctrine. Dissatisfaction among some Methodists with regard to the increasingly exclusive power of the clergy, particularly bishops, and the exclusion of laymen from the councils of the Church, including the Annual (regional) and General (national) Conferences.

=== Establishment ===
In response to actual and threatened expulsions, a convention was held in Baltimore, November 12, 1828, an initial organization was formed with the provisional name of "The Associated Methodist Churches," temporary Articles of Association adopted, and its first General Conference scheduled for 1830. The intervening time was used to form local churches and organized into annual (regional) conferences. Fourteen Annual Conferences were represented by one hundred and fourteen delegates at the first General Conference, called to order on November 2, 1830. The delegates adopted the permanent name "Methodist Protestant Church" to denote its connection to the reform movement, adopted a Constitution and Discipline reflecting the representative form the reformers had sought within the Methodist Episcopal Church. Unlike the Methodist Episcopal Church, the Methodist Protestant Church rejected the use of bishops. In the MEC, the bishops had the power to appoint pastors to local churches. The Methodist Protestant Church appointed pastors by a president of the conference. The conference then affirmed the appointment.

=== Reunification and organized dissent ===
After the formation of the Methodist Protestant Church, the Methodist Episcopal Church had become further fractured by the corresponding division of the nation during the American Civil War. At the conclusion of that military conflict, the corresponding division between Northern and Southern Methodist Episcopal Churches remained. While discussion toward reunification went forward slowly, many of the democratic reforms of church governance were adopted which had led to a separate Methodist Protestant Church. Consequently, the reunification process was broadened to include all three major "streams" of American Methodism, and resulted in a Uniting Convention being convened in 1939 with representatives of the General and Annual Conferences of the three separate bodies as delegates.

Some of the original differences between Methodist Protestant Church and the Methodist Episcopal Church remained unresolved. Additionally, many Methodist Protestants objected to liberalization on the part of the Methodist Episcopal Church with respect to the inspiration and authority of the Scriptures, the deity of Christ and Wesley's teachings on the work of the Holy Spirit. This opinion was the minority view in most Methodist Protestant Annual Conferences, the Mississippi Conference being the sole exception. The Uniting Convention proceeded to effect the merger, which formed The Methodist Church, which in 1968 merged with the Evangelical United Brethren to form the United Methodist Church. Those who objected to the merger continued as the Methodist Protestant Church.

== Notable people ==
- Daniel Bagley (1818–1905), preacher, educational booster, industrialist
- Ancel Henry Bassett (1809–1886), minister, author, editor, historian
- John Calvin Broomfield (1872–1950), pastor and bishop
- Aubrey Franklin Hess (1874–1935), theologian and educator
- Hubert D. Humphreys (1923–2009)) engaged in research on the history of the Methodist Protestant Church
- Eugenia St. John Mann (1847-1932), ordained minister in the Kansas Conference of the Methodist Protestant Church; first woman in the U.S. to sit as a delegate in the General Conference of the Methodist Protestant Church
- Mary A. Miller (1837 – 1925), editor and publisher of Methodist Protestant Church missionary periodicals
- James O'Kelly (1735–1826), clergyman
- Thomas H. Stockton (1808–1868), Chaplain of the United States House of Representatives
- Lula Wardlow (1876–1970), businesswoman, minister, first woman ever elected mayor of a Louisiana community
