= Eugenia St. John Mann =

American ordained minister, evangelist, temperance lecturer, suffragist (1847–1932)

Rev. Eugenia St. John Mann
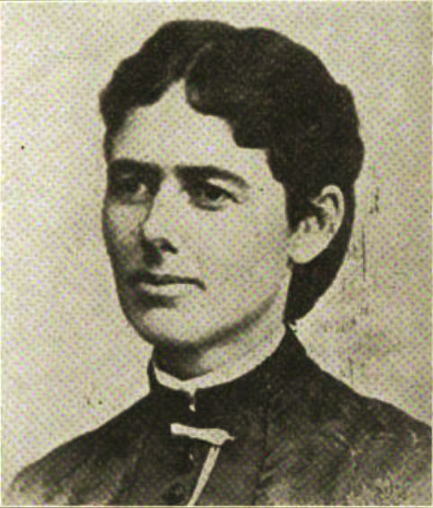

Personal life
- Born: Eugenia Florence Shultz; June 4, 1847 Elgin, Illinois, U.S.
- Died: February 29, 1932 (aged 84) Long Beach, California, U.S.
- Resting place: Salina, Kansas, U.S.
- Spouse: Charles Henry St. John (m. 1969; died 1904); Francis Worcester Mann (m. 1920; died 1931)
- Known for: First woman who ever sat as delegate in the General Conference of the Methodist Protestant Church in the U.S.

Religious life
- Religion: Christianity
- Denomination: Methodist Protestant Church
- Profession: ordained minister; evangelist; temperance lecturer; suffragist
- Ordination: 1887

Eugenia St. John Mann (1847–1932; née Shultz; after first marriage, St. John; after second marriage, Mann) was an American ordained minister, evangelist, temperance lecturer, and suffragist. She served as national evangelist of the Woman's Christian Temperance Union (WCTU), President of the Illinois WCTU, and national lecturer of the International Organisation of Good Templars (IOGT). St. John became ordained a minister in the Kansas Conference of the Methodist Protestant Church, and in 1892, was elected to the General Conference, being the first woman who ever sat as delegate in the General Conference of that denomination in the U.S. Mann held pastorates in ten churches, retiring from active work in 1920. She was known as a gifted orator who also composed her own songs for her evangelistic work. Mann also served as President of the Kansas Equal Suffrage Association, 1885–95.

== Early life and education ==
Eugenia (nickname, "Jennie") Florence (or Florenci) Shultz (also spelled "Shults") was born in Elgin, Illinois, June 4, 1847. She was of German and Scotch-Irish descent. Norman L. Shultz (1822–1888) and Nancy Daralin (Rice) Shultz. Eugenia's siblings were Charlotte, Adin, and Alice.

She was educated in the public schools of Kane County, graduating from high school at the age of fourteen.

== Career ==
She spent the next several years in teaching, including at the village school during the civil war.

In 1869, she married the Rev. Dr. Charles Henry St. John (1843–1904; D.D. 1900), of the Methodist Episcopal Church. He was a nephew of Kansas Governor John St. John.

With her husband, she took up the duties of the Methodist itinerancy in Bloomington, Illinois. In 1878, her husband's health failed and he was for some time incapable of pulpit and pastoral work. At the request of the several churches of the circuit, Mrs. St. John was given authority to take up his work. She rode 14 miles (23 km) and preached every evening and three times on Sunday, until the end of the meeting, then continued his work for two months, until he recovered his health. She was also active in mission work, serving as secretary of the Illinois Conference's Woman's Foreign Missionary Society of the Methodist Episcopal Church for four years.

Early on, St. John became active in the temperance cause, joining the WCTU and the IOGT, and engaging in active temperance work. In 1879, she became a Prohibitionist, and in the same year, Frances Willard appointed her State president of the WCTU of Illinois. She was one of the 31 delegates chosen to present to the Illinois General Assembly the local-option petition of 110,000 names, secured by the WCTU.

In 1880, they began an evangelistic work which they continued together until 1904, during which they preached in every large city from San Francisco to New York. They worked together for the cause of temperance in the days when as they drove through the streets, her husband handled the lines with one hand and held his revolver in the other.

The couple removed to Denver, Colorado in 1881, where they affiliated with the temperance organizations in that State. She was made Colorado State lecturer for the WCTU and for the IOGT. In 1883, she was elected delegate to the Right Worthy Grand Lodge (RWGL) of the World, held at Washington, D.C. At this time, she entered the national work of the IOGT, under the Eastern Lecture Bureau, speaking for 39 summer assemblies, including those of Canada, New York, and Pennsylvania; and she returned to these encampments five years in succession.

In 1884, she was called to the national board of lecturers of the WCTU. She took the WCTU theological course, and in 1885, was admitted by Willard and the Union board as a national evangelist.

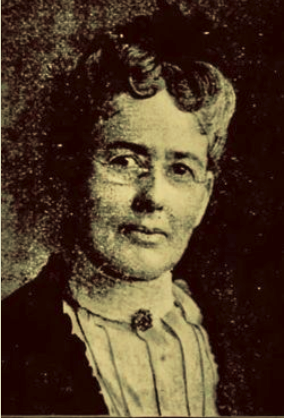
(1903)

In 1887, St. John transferred her membership to the Methodist Protestant Church, took the theological course of that church, was ordained a minister in the Kansas Conference, and in 1892, was elected to the General Conference, being the first woman who ever sat as a delegate in the General Conference of that denomination in the U.S. She served pastorates in Kansas for over ten years at Emporia, Neosho Rapids, and Kansas City. She lectured in 127 towns in that State, organized 87 Unions, children's temperance societies, and 10 White Cross bands, and, with her husband, aided in the conversion of over 4.000 persons who united with various churches.

In 1889, the couple went to London to attend the first World's Sunday-school Convention, both of them being delegates from Kansas Sunday schools.

She was one of the speakers at the Congress of Representative Women of the World's Columbian Exposition, held at Chicago in 1893, and traveled and lectured throughout Europe and the U.S. Mrs. St. John was a delegate to the National WCTU Convention many times, and was for some years a national evangelist and lecturer for the Union. Tn the campaign for Prohibition in Nebraska, she traveled more than 900 miles (1,400 km) and delivered 63 addresses. She also campaigned for Prohibition in Illinois, Washington, Idaho, Montana, Colorado, California, Wyoming, South Dakota, and Ohio.

During World War I, she served as camp mother in the Base Hospital at Fort Riley, Kansas, under appointment of the State WCTU.

== Later life ==
When over 60 years of age, St. John took up a homestead of 320 acres (130 ha) in Colorado, and without assistance, improved the land, and proved up on her claim, which she later sold at a profit.

On October 7, 1920, in Salina, Kansas, St. John married Francis Worcester Mann (1845–1931), of Devils Lake, North Dakota, who had been a childhood friend of hers in Illinois, and with him settled at Long Beach, California.

Eugenia St. John Mann died in Long Beach, California, February 29, 1932; interment was in Salina, Kansas.
