= Michael Coper =

Australian legal academic (1946–2019)

Michael David Coper AO FAAL (27 April 1946 – 13 April 2019) was an Australian legal academic, one of Australia's leading constitutional lawyers, author, and one of the founders of the law school at the University of New South Wales.

== Early years ==
Coper attended Cranbrook from 1950 to 1963.

== Career ==
Coper studied law at the University of Sydney. He was a Fulbright Senior Scholar at the University of Virginia in 1978.

Coper was one of the founders of the law school at the University of New South Wales in 1971 and taught law at the University until 1987.

Coper was associated with the Australian trucking industry in the 1980s as the legal member of the NSW Road Freight Transport Industry Council. In 1988 he was appointed to the Inter-State Commission, producing several reports on the Australian waterfront and interstate land transport. Coper was appointed as Chair of the TruckSafe Industry Accreditation Council in 1996.

Coper came to prominence with his prize-winning 1983 book Freedom of Interstate Trade under the Australian Constitution, which was influential in the High Court's change of direction five years later in the landmark case of Cole v Whitfield, in which Professor Coper also appeared as counsel. His 1987 book Encounters with the Australian Constitution was received to great acclaim, as was the project he conceived and co-edited to fruition in 2001, the comprehensive Oxford Companion to the High Court of Australia.

In 1995 Coper was Professor of Constitutional Law at the Australian National University. Coper was the Dean of the College of Law at the Australian National University from 1998 to 2012. Chair of the Council of Australian Law Deans (2005–2007), Vice President of the International Association of Law Schools (2011–2014), a member of the American Law Institute and a Foundation Fellow of the Australian Academy of Law.

== Works ==
- Blackshield, A. R. (Anthony Roland,), 1937–; Coper, Michael; Williams, George, 1969– (2001), The Oxford companion to the High Court of Australia (1st ed.), Oxford University Press, ISBN 978-0-19-554022-2
- Coper, Michael; Australia. Constitution (1988), Encounters with the Australian constitution (Popular ed.), CCH Australia, ISBN 978-1-86264-089-4
- Coper, Michael; Queensland Institute of Technology. Law Library (1983), Freedom of interstate trade under the Australian constitution, Butterworths, ISBN 978-0-409-49180-7 which was influential in the Australian High Court case of Cole v Whitfield
- Coper, Michael; Coper, Michael. Constitutional obstacles to organised marketing in Australia : a postscript; Coper, Michael. Agricultural marketing and the constitution : does the wheat scheme infringe Section 92? (1978), Constitutional obstacles to organised marketing in Australia : Michael Coper, s.n.)
- Coper, Michael; Williams, George), eds. (1997), Justice Lionel Murphy : influential or merely prescient?, The Federation Press, ISBN 978-1-86287-262-2
- Coper, Michael (1981), The judicial interpretation of section 92 of the Australian constitution : Michael Coper, Kensington, N.S.W
- Coper, Michael; Williams, George, 1969– (1997), How many cheers for Engineers?, Federation Press, ISBN 978-1-86287-228-8
- Coper, Michael; Williams, George, 1969– (1997), Power, parliament and the people, Federation Press, ISBN 978-1-86287-247-9
- Coper, Michael (1983), The Franklin Dam case : commentary, and full text of the decision in Commonwealth of Australia v State of Tasmania – Sydney : Butterworths, 1983
- Coper, Michael; Parliament House (Canberra, A.C.T.); Coper, Michael (2000), Dismissed! : Whitlam, Fraser, Kerr and the story of 1975, Old Parliament House, ISBN 978-0-646-40654-1
- Coper, Michael; Williams, George, 1969–; Australian National University. Centre for International and Public Law (1997), The Cauldron of constitutional change, Centre for International and Public Law, Australian National University, ISBN 978-0-7315-2661-1
- Coper, Michael; Australian Society of Labor Lawyers. National Conference Canberra, A.C.T.) (10th : 1988 (1900), Some reflections on constitutional change, [1988]
- Coper, Michael (15 November 2016). "The Seven Habits of a Highly Effective High Court". Alternative Law Journal. 28 (2): 59–64. doi:10.1177/1037969X0302800202. hdl:1885/41122. S2CID 143269755.
- Coper, Michael (1 January 2010). "Educating Lawyers for What? Reshaping the Idea of Law School". Penn State International Law Review. 29 (1): 25–40.

== Awards and honours ==
- 2017 – Coper was appointed as Professor Emeritus of the Australian National University
- 2018 – Officer in the Order of Australia for distinguished service to legal education, and to the law, as an academic, author and administrator, through advisory roles, and to safety standards in the transport industry.
- 2018 – A book of essays was published in his honour Encounters with constitutional interpretation and legal education : essays in honour of Michael Coper
- 2019 – Doctor of Laws honoris causa from University of New South Wales

== Personal life ==
Coper is the father of Australian political campaigner Ed Coper.
