= Aubrey Franklin Hess =

American theologian and educator

Aubrey Franklin Hess (December 8, 1874 – October 27, 1935) was a progressive American theologian and educator who was born in Virginia. Although Hess had no formal theological training he was ordained in the Methodist Protestant Church in 1896 and immediately served two small congregations in West Virginia. Later, after completing his formal theological and university education, Hess served as president of the Methodist Protestant institutions of West Lafayette College, Ohio and Adrian College, Michigan.

After leaving Adrian College in 1917, Hess returned to church pastoral duties ministering to Methodist Protestant, Congregational and Unitarian-Universalist churches.

Hess made nationwide news in 1927 when he changed the traditional wedding vow of “until death us do part” to “as long as this union shall last.” Hess believed in the separation of state and church. Although his church granted divine sanction for a civil ceremony, state law retained provisions for marriage annulment regardless of the words used in the wedding ceremony. Hess also dropped the use of the word “obey” from the wedding service. Instead, he solicited a promise given freely to provide, protect and keep pure. He concluded his reasoning saying, “I would not, under any circumstances, perform a ceremony where these conditions were not mutually agreed. I would never ask if they will ‘obey.’ What's the use?”

== Early life and education ==
Hess was born December 8, 1874, in the Blue Ridge Mountains of Virginia. He was the only child of John A. Hess and Mary E. Hess (nee Thomas). When Hess was five years old, his mother died. His father later remarried, giving Hess an immediate family of seven half brothers and sisters.

In a 1926 newspaper interview, Hess recalled that his father, a hardscrabble mountain farmer, was not an educated man. Growing up, Hess attended only local public schools and had few experiences outside that of a farm boy.

=== Randolph-Macon Academy and correspondence course ===
Hess expanded his early mountain education with a two-year course of study at Randolph-Macon Academy in Front Royal, Virginia. Hess graduated from this preparatory school in 1895. Afterward, Hess returned to West Virginia where he completed a four-year (1896–1900) correspondence course (also known as a conference course) "under state-authorized facility and examiners."

=== Westminster Theological Seminary ===
In 1900 or 1901 Hess started formal theological studies at Westminster Theological Seminary in Westminster, Maryland. Hess also simultaneously took additional courses at Western Maryland College that shared a common campus with the seminary. Upon graduation from theology school in 1903, Hess was 29 years old, married and had two children.

=== University of West Virginia ===
Hess continued his studies (1903–1908) at the University of West Virginia (UWV). Hess enrolled as a “special” student, as were many others. In 1906 he was awarded a “special” A.B. (Artium Baccalaureus—Bachelor of Arts) degree, and in 1907 he was awarded a “special” A & S degree (it is not known what this degree is).

Newspaper accounts also indicate that Hess was a teacher at the university and a part-time minister for the Methodist Protestant Church in Morgantown, West Virginia. In August 1908, Hess resigned his part-time pastorate and his West Virginia University teaching position to accept a one-year teaching assignment at Kansas City University, Missouri.

== Denominational and educational career ==
=== Early pastorates ===
Hess's ministerial career pre-dates his formal theological education. He was ordained in the Methodist Protestant denomination around 1896 in Harrisville, West Virginia. He later held pastorates in two West Virginia churches; Nestorville (1896–1897) and St. Mary's (1898–1900).

Following his pastorate in St. Mary's, Hess, as noted earlier, devoted time from 1900 to 1908 on academic studies. From 1903 to 1908 Hess was also a part-time pastor to the Methodist Protestant Church in Morgantown, West Virginia.

During his time in Morgantown, Hess became engaged in Methodist Protestant denominational affairs. At the 1908 Methodist Protestant quadrennial conference, Hess was successfully nominated to serve on the board of governors of his alma mater, the Westminster Theological Seminary. Hess, however, was unsuccessful in his bid to be secretary of the board for the Young People's Work organization, the denomination's effort to harness youth engagement. Hess also served on the conference's standing education committee. At the next quadrennial conference in 1912, Hess again was successfully nominated to the board of governors of the Westminster Theological Seminary. He was also assigned to the Revisions Committee of the conference.

=== Methodist Protestant Church in Buckhannon, West Virginia ===
Following his one-year assignment in Kansas City in 1909, Hess accepted the pastorate of the Methodist Protestant Church in Buckhannon, West Virginia. Hess extended his denominational activities to the local level allowing his name to be offered for the presidency of the West Virginia Methodist Protestant Conference. Hess led on early balloting, but when notified by telegram that his ill wife had taken a turn for the worse, he withdrew his name from consideration.

=== College president ===
Two years later, in 1911, Hess resigned his pastorate in West Virginia and moved to Ohio to accept the position of president of West Lafayette College.

West Lafayette College, incorporated in 1900, was the newest of the educational institutions maintained by the Methodist Protestant Church. In the public announcement of Hess's appointment as the college president, a Ph.D. academic credential was associated with Hess. No earlier public record had reported that Hess had achieved such a degree. It is assumed that the college conferred an honorary degree to the incoming president.

Among the actions taken by Hess as president at West Lafayette College was his proposal to consolidate his college with the Michigan-based Adrian College, another Methodist Protestant Church educational institution. The West Lafayette College trustees, however, voted to surrender control of the college to the General Conference of the Methodist Protestant Church for liquidation. At the 1916 Methodist Protestant quadrennial conference, the matter was resolved with the decision to consolidate the two colleges to Adrian, Michigan. Hess was appointed as Adrian's new president.

Hess remained at Adrian College until he resigned in 1917 to resume pastoral duties at the First Congregational Church of Manistee in Michigan.

=== First Congregational Church of Manistee ===
There is little in the public record on Hess's pastorate in Manistee (1917–1921). The only contemporary comment on Hess's pastorate is offered in a history written of the Manistee church.

"The Reverend Dr. A. F. Hess was a man with a ‘brilliant mind and an eloquent tongue.’ He made patriotic addresses all over the country. He formed a group of around 100 men to discuss the war and other questions of the day. He gave a series of lectures on psychology."

During his Manistee pastorate, Hess was also recognized by the American City Bureau as one of America's 100 best speakers in the United States.

=== First Methodist Protestant Church ===
Hess’s next pastorate was at the First Methodist Protestant Church (1921–1925) in Fort Worth, Texas. This pastorate was the result of a decision made by the Methodist Protestant Home Mission to send a minister to the Dallas – Fort Worth area to help build up the church in that area. Unfortunately, the public record of Hess's endeavors is silent. What is clear is that in 1925 he departed Fort Worth as well as left the Methodist Protestant denomination when he assumed the pastorate of the First Congregational Church in Beaumont, Texas.

=== First Congregational Church in Beaumont ===
The pulpit in Beaumont became vacant following the resignation of the church’s founder, Dr. Samuel Holden, who, after two years, accepted an appointment to the office of the assistant superintendent of the Congregational Church in the central south region. In founding the church, Dr. Holden said, “In the record of our Lord’s life He gives us in clear language, so plain that He cannot be misunderstood or misinterpreted, at least four tests of a Christian disciple.” Those tests were loyalty to the truth, love of humanity, doing good, and cross-bearing, or, as Holden noted, the totality of life is summed up in what good we may do in life.

Hess's sermon topics in his inaugural year reflected both his desire to prepare his flock to be Christian disciples and his belief that religion includes the embrace of the human experience. Those topics include: “The Appeal and Response of Christ's Love as Revealed in Human Relationships,” “Shall We Cease to Think in Matters of Religion or Adopt a Policy of Blind Faith” and “The God of Human Experience.”

Hess extended his ministry beyond his Sunday pulpit to what was described in the local newspaper as a “Miniature University.” The Tuesday morning Woman's Lecture Club was devoted to a series of lectures by Hess on the philosophy of religion that explored world religions. Wednesday night classes offered lectures on general psychology. Friday night classes were designed for parents with lectures on child psychology. Three of these lectures also aired on the local KFDM radio station. A Boy's Science Club was also conducted with the purpose of explaining, as Hess said, “the what and why” of things to the church youth.

A large advertisement for the First Congregational Church in the Beaumont Enterprise newspaper reflected both Hess's and the church's character: “This is a distinctive church with a distinctive aim. It has no creed and values truth more highly than belief. It is emphatically opposed to ignorance, prejudice, religious bigotry, injustice, and desecration of human values.”

Hess's pastorate in Beaumont ended in 1930 when he accepted a call to the United Liberal Church in Atlanta, Georgia.

=== United Liberal Church, Atlanta ===
Hess's call to Atlanta was the result of outreach by Hess to Rev. George F. Patterson, executive vice president of the American Unitarian Association in Boston, Massachusetts. In a November 29, 1929, letter from Hess to Patterson, Hess followed up on a conversation the two gentlemen had had at the Southwestern Federation of Religious Liberals held in Lawrence, Kansas, early that year regarding Hess's desire to fellowship with the Unitarians.

Hess's new pastorate (1930–1935) at the United Liberal Church inserted him into a religious environment that was distinctively unique. The United Liberal Church was the result of a 1918 decision by local Atlanta Unitarians and Universalists to merge into a single congregation. This local merger pre-dates the national merger of the two denominations in 1961.

The 1918 merger was intended to be “a temporary merger to last for the duration of the war (World War I) and help win the war by saving fuel and light.” However, the merger continued until 1950 when internal and external conflicts over racial and political issues resulted in the collapse of this joint Unitarian Universalist congregation.

Hess assumed a pulpit in Atlanta that had been vacant for nine months following the resignation of Rev. Clinton Lee Scott. Scott had been a popular minister who had provided the joint congregation a sense of unity and achieved a sense of financial stability that had long eluded the congregation. Hess wrote to Rev. George F. Patterson one month after arriving in Atlanta, stating that he had not yet acquired a “definite knowledge as to the real conditions of the Atlanta Church.”

Hess's sermons continued to have a familiar ring: “The Kingdom of God Is Within You,” “Christianity As It Was and Now Is” and “Jesus As He Must Have Been.”

Hess did not, however, reprise his miniature university concept in Atlanta. Atlanta home to several universities, libraries and arts venues was a more cosmopolitan environment than Beaumont. Additionally, the Atlanta church had long had an active men's and women's organizations that had been well-established venues for social and cultural exchange opportunities.

Since the founding of the church in 1884, Hess was only the third minister to serve five or more years in the pulpit. His ministry ending only by his unexpected death in October 1935.

== Personal life ==
In May 1897 Hess married Sabina Francina “Bina” Livesay in West Virginia. Into that marriage four children were born; Aubrey W. (1899–1929), Adrian T. (1900–1939), Robert LD (1903–1992) and Wanda L. (1908–1997).

The eldest child Aubrey W. served in France in World War I. After the war, Aubrey W. and his brother Adrian formed an aircraft manufacturing company in Michigan. In 1919 it was announced that the Rev. Aubrey F. Hess had been appointed the president of the aircraft company, Alliance Aircraft. This position was assumed to be honorific. Aubrey W. died in October 1929 when an aircraft he was testing caught fire and crashed.

Hess's marriage to Bina ended sometime in the mid-1920s. Hess subsequently remarried Jean Markley (née Van Horn). The only child of that marriage was Jean Cathlean who was born in 1928.

Rev. Hess died at 8 o’clock in the morning on October 27, 1935, of a heart attack in the lobby of the Waldo Hotel in Clarksburg, West Virginia. Hess had just attended the general convention of the Universalist church in Washington, D.C., and was en route to Cincinnati, Ohio to attend the general convention of the Unitarian church. Hess's death was widely reported in newspapers. The December 1935 issue of The Universalist Herald ran a cover story on Hess's death, publishing his last sermon “What is a Man Without Honor” and the sermon of Rev. John Rowlett delivered at Hess's funeral service.

In his funeral sermon, Rev. Rowlett said, "A great and good man has gone. Our whole denomination and the cause of liberalism has lost something great." Rev. Rowlett continued, "He was a true liberal. He had a free mind. His mind was open to the four corners of the earth, ready, willing, and eager to welcome truth from whatever direction it might come. He demanded an idea no passport of tradition but only the passport of truth.”

== Legacy ==
His widow, Jean Hess remained an active member of the United Liberal Church until that congregation collapsed in 1950. Jean Hess continued her active membership in the rebirth of the new Unitarian Universalist congregation under the ministry of Rev. Edward Cahill. That new congregation gave rise to the Unitarian Universalist Congregation of Atlanta (UUCA) in the early 1960s.

Due to growth and overcrowding in the late 1960s at UUCA, a new Unitarian congregation spun off from UUCA called Northwest Unitarian Church. The widow Jean Hess and her daughter joined that new church. Jean Wells (née Hess) was a Charter Member of that church.
