= Robert Nicholson (judge) =

Australian judge

Robert David Nicholson AO FAAL is an Australian judge. He served as a Judge of the Federal Court of Australia from 1995 to 2007, in the Court's Perth registry.

Nicholson was admitted as a legal practitioner in 1960, and held the position of Justice of the Supreme Court of Western Australia from 1988 to 1994, prior to his position in the Federal Court.

He was a recipient of the Centenary Medal in 2001 for service to the judiciary, to education and to the community.

He was awarded an Officer of the Order of Australia (AO) in 2002 for service to the judiciary and to the law, to education, particularly in the area of university administration, and to the community.

Since 2008, he has taught at the University of Melbourne's Law School. He is a Life Fellow of the Australian Academy of Law.
