= Mary A. Miller =

American editor, publisher of missionary periodicals

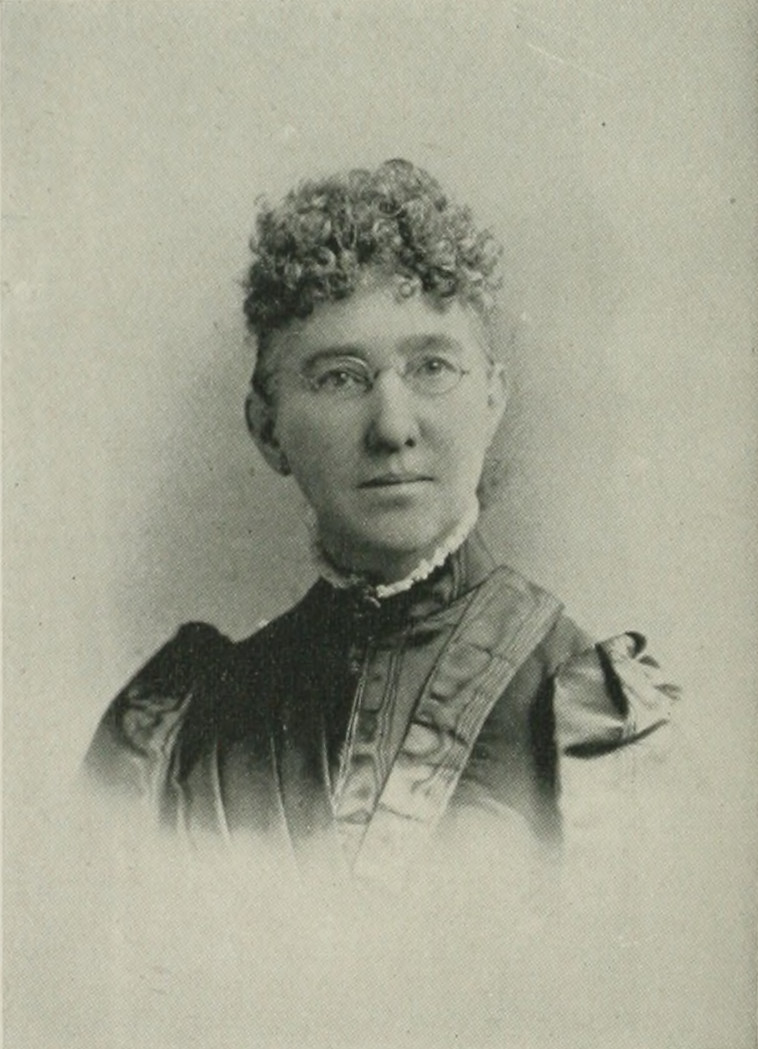
- Photo in A Woman of the Century
- Born: Mary A. Davis; September 18, 1837; Allegheny, Pennsylvania, U.S.
- Died: September 23, 1925 (aged 88)
- Resting place: Forest Hill Cemetery, Dunmore, Pennsylvania
- Education: Allegheny College for Young Ladies
- Occupations: Editor, publisher
- Spouse: William Miller
- Writing career
- Genre: Missionary
- Notable work: History of the Woman's Foreign Missionary Society of the Methodist Protestant Church

Mary A. Miller (née Davis; September 18, 1837 – September 23, 1925) was an American editor and publisher of missionary periodicals from Pennsylvania. She was also the author of History of the Woman's Foreign Missionary Society of the Methodist Protestant Church, 1896. Miller's name appeared as missionary editor of the woman's department in the Methodist Recorder, published in Pittsburgh, and since 1885, as editor and publisher at the Woman's Missionary Record, organ of the Woman's Foreign Missionary Society of the Methodist Protestant Church (WFMS; organized in 1879). She was the first editor of the Woman's Missionary Record, serving in that role for ten years. Miller served as corresponding secretary of the society for six years, represented the society in a number of the annual conferences of the church, in two general conferences, and in 1888, was a delegate to the World's Missionary Conference in London, England.

== Early life and education ==
Mary A. Davis was born in Allegheny, Pennsylvania, September 18, 1837. She was the second daughter of David Davis.

Until the age of seventeen, she studied in the schools of her native city, her higher education being received in the Allegheny College for Young Ladies, in the same town.

== Career ==
Choosing the profession of teacher, she taught for five years, until she married William Miller, of Allegheny. Her first public literary work was done in 1858, being poems and short stories, the latter of which were continued with more or less intermission, under a pen name, until 1874, when the death of her husband and the business cares consequently caused an interruption. Her natural timidity, in her early efforts, caused her frequently to change her pen name, so that it often occurred in the household that her stories were read without a suspicion of the author's presence. Her first literary work over her own name was in 1878, being a series of letters descriptive of a western trip from Pittsburgh, Pennsylvania, to Montana by rail and stage, from Montana to Utah, and from Utah to New Mexico.

Miller was a founding member of the WFMS of the Methodist Protestant Church, having been appointed to sign its Charter, along with Mrs. John Scott, Mrs. Susan E. Anderson, Mrs. J. H. Claney, and Mrs. James I. Bennett. During the Second Annual Meeting of the WFMS, held in Pittsburgh, 1881, Miller was elected editor of the "Methodist Recorder", which place she filled until the Society's official organ was started, when she became its editor. That organ, Woman's Missionary Record, was a monthly, at the price of US$.50 a year.

During the Third Annual Meeting, held in Cambridge, Ohio, 1882 Miller stated that in her opinion, "The Society's wish to be independent of the Board of Missions was that it might be able to push its work abroad with more rapidity than the policy of the Board seemed to favor." At the Fifth Annual Meeting, held in Springfield, Ohio, 1884, Miller was one of three women appointed to represent the Society at the General Conference. At the Eighth Annual Meeting, Held in Ohio, Illinois, 1887, Miller and Mrs. J. E. Palmer were elected to represent the WFMS at the next session of the General Conference. At the Ninth Annual Meeting, held in Washington, D.C., 1888, it was announced that the Society had been represented by Miller at the first Ecumenical Conference of Foreign Missions of World's Missionary Convention which met in Exeter Hall London with Miller bearing her own expenses that she might be present at this meeting and thus gain new inspiration, and likewise, place the work of the Society along with more veteran organizations.

The Sixteenth Annual Session was held in 1895 at the Lafayette Ave. Methodist Protestant Church, in Baltimore, Maryland, at which, Miller, editor of the "Missionary Record", presented her resignation as she was leaving Pittsburgh to make her home in Kansas City, Kansas. She wrote the history of the WFMS in 1896, having compiled the history of the first sixteen years of the organization.

In 1907, she accompanied Marietta Louise Gibson Stephens and Julia Hickey to Japan to visit the mission stations of that country.

== Death ==
Miller died September 23, 1925, and was buried at Forest Hill Cemetery, Dunmore, Pennsylvania.

== Selected works ==
- History of the Woman's Foreign Missionary Society of the Methodist Protestant Church, 1896
