= Kevin Lindgren =

Australian judge

Kevin Edmund Lindgren AM FAAL KC is an Australian lawyer and a former judge of the Federal Court of Australia.

Lindgren was educated in Newcastle, New South Wales, and was dux of Newcastle Boys' Technical High School in the leaving certificate of 1956. In 1957 he began his legal career as an articled law clerk at the firm of H. V. Harris Wheeler and Williams, one of the city's oldest law firms (which practises today as Hall & Wilcox). In the Solicitors' Admission Board examinations over the period 1957 to 1962 Lindgren gained first place in the state of New South Wales concurrently with studies for the Bachelor of Arts degree at the University of New South Wales through the then Newcastle University College.

Admitted as a solicitor of the Supreme Court of New South Wales in May 1962, Lindgren became a partner at Harris Wheeler Williams & MacKenzie. In 1965 he obtained the LLB (Bachelor of Laws, with honours) as an external student of the University of London, and in 1967 the MA (Master of Arts) from the newly autonomous University of Newcastle. Lindgren joined the academic staff at Newcastle in 1969, becoming Professor of Law in 1973. He completed his PhD at Newcastle in 1972 with a thesis entitled 'The sources and some aspects of the historical development of the law governing contracts by registered companies'. Lindgren remained in academe until 1984 when he relocated to Sydney to practise at the Bar. In 1991 Lindgren was appointed QC and, in 1994, became a judge of the Federal Court of Australia.

Since his retirement in 2010 Lindgren continues to share his expertise as an independent mediator, arbitrator and referee. He is an Honorary Member of the Eleventh Floor Wentworth Chambers in Sydney. From 2011 to 2020 he was the President of the Australian Academy of Law, of which he was made a Life Fellow in 2020.
