= Federal Law Review =

- Discipline: Law
- Language: English

Publication details
- History: 1964-present
- Publisher: ANU College of Law (Australia)
- Frequency: Quarterly

Standard abbreviations
- ISO 4: Fed. Law Rev.

Indexing
- ISSN: 0067-205X
- LCCN: 77020319
- OCLC no.: 50700465

Links
- Journal homepage

The Federal Law Review is a quarterly peer-reviewed law review established in 1964. It is published by the ANU College of Law. It is an A* ranked law review according to the Australian Business Deans Council and Excellence in Research for Australia (ERA) 2010 law journal rankings. It is one of Australia's leading law journals. The Federal Law Review's General Editor is Dr Stephen Thomson.
