= Ancel Henry Bassett =

Methodist Protestant Church figure

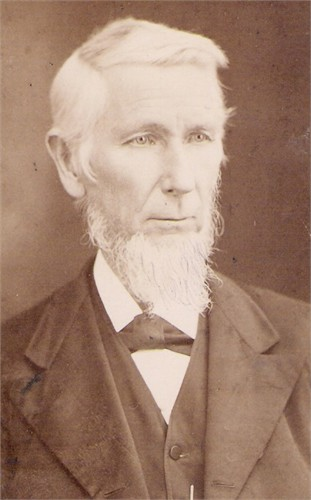
Basset in 1883

Ancel Henry Bassett (July 1, 1809 – August 30, 1886) was a Methodist minister, author, editor, and historian who left the Methodist Episcopal Church to join the Methodist Protestant Church soon after its founding in 1830. He became an influential leader of that denomination, editing one of its primary periodicals, the Western Recorder. In 1875, the General Conference of the Methodist Protestant Church requested that he write and publish a denominational history, which was published in 1877.

== Early life and ministry ==
He was born in Sandwich, Massachusetts, the youngest child of Elihu and Abigail (Dillingham) Bassett. The Bassetts moved to Cincinnati, Ohio, in 1810, and Ancel's father died there in 1814. He became a Christian at age twelve and joined the Methodist Episcopal Church. While attending school in Cincinnati, he was able to study Greek, as well as work in a book bindery in the evenings and on Saturdays. In 1827 he observed some of the debates of the Methodist reform movement, and when the movement formally seceded from the Methodist Episcopal Church in 1828 over the issue of bishops and representation of the laity, he left the church to join the new Methodist Protestant Church. After meeting him, Asa Shinn, a minister and leader in the Methodist Protestant Church, encouraged him to enter the ministry, and he was licensed to preach in Cincinnati in 1830. Three years later he was elected to serve as Secretary of the Ohio Conference, which he did for seven consecutive years, and then he was elected to serve as President of the Conference, which he did for five years.

== Marriage ==
He married Priscilla White on August 24, 1837, in Greenbush, Preble County, Ohio. Priscilla was the oldest child of Robert and Mary (Johnson) White. Priscilla, named after her fifth-great-grandmother, Priscilla Alden, was well-educated herself and interested in history, genealogy, and Christian missions. Priscilla was the daughter of a Methodist minister, Robert White (1795–1870), the granddaughter of a Methodist minister, Jeremiah Johnson (1763–1847), and the sister of three ministers, Joseph Johnson White (1817–1893), James Gibson White (1823–1913), and Lorenzo Johnson White (1828–1893).

== Editor, Publisher, and Hymnwriter ==
In 1845 he left the preaching ministry to become Editor of the Western Recorder, which was a denominational newspaper with anti-slavery sentiment published in Zanesville, Ohio. In 1854 the publication became the official periodical for all Northern and Western Conferences of the Methodist Protestant Church. Bassett was elected Editor, and then Book Agent, and then Publishing Agent, and served in these capacities until he retired in 1872. Bassett wrote many of the articles in the periodicals, as well as Sunday School curriculum, and other denominational materials. He wrote numerous articles condemning slavery, due to strong personal conviction. He edited the denomination's 1860 hymnal, Hymn Book for the Methodist Protestant Church, and helped compile its 1873 hymnal, The Voice of Praise. He wrote the hymn "Midnight Praise", which is included in the 1873 hymnal.

== Historian and Author ==
Bassett demonstrated a passion for history in his years as Editor and Publisher. "He possessed a peculiarly retentive memory, and facts once fixed in his mind seemed never to fade out." He had over fifty years of denominational periodicals and records in his possession. While living in Springfield, Ohio, he helped organize a local historical society for Clark County, Ohio, called "The Mad River Valley Pioneer and Historical Association" and served as its first president in 1870. In his inaugural address, he emphasized the importance of preserving history: "To rescue from oblivion interesting facts and important information, would seem a duty which we owe to those who come after us. The present is indebted to the past; so the present should provide for the future. Today has the benefit of yesterday's observations and experiences; so should today preserve and carry forward its accumulated information for the benefit of tomorrow."

Given his resources and interest in history, the General Conference of 1875 asked Bassett to write a new history of the denomination. He wrote A Concise History of the Methodist Protestant Church in 1877, which was republished in two subsequent editions, and has been viewed as a "valuable contribution to ecclesiastical history". Although there were other histories written, Bassett desired to emphasize the anti-slavery sympathies of the Western and Northern Conferences which he felt were understated in other histories.

== Other interests ==
In addition to history, music, Bible, and theology, he was interested in botany, geology, and astronomy. He collected specimens, and sought out the latest literature and authors on a variety of subjects. In 1845 the "Western Academy of Science" in Cincinnati elected him a corresponding member of that institution. He received his Doctor of Divinity degree from Adrian College. Several unpublished works of his have been preserved by his descendants, including an autobiography and a miniature encyclopedia.

== Death ==
Ancel and Priscilla Bassett did not have any children. However, when Priscilla's younger sister, Susan White Bonebrake, died in 1858, Ancel and Priscilla adopted her daughter Caroline Bonebrake and raised her. He died on August 30, 1886, in Casstown, Ohio, at the home of their adopted daughter and niece, Caroline. He is buried in the Ferncliff Cemetery in Springfield, Ohio.
