= Priestley 11 =

Law subjects required for practice in Australia

The Priestley 11 are eleven law subjects required to be successfully completed for candidate status for admission into practice as a legal practitioner in Australia. They are named after the Law Admissions Consultative Committee (LACC, commonly known as the Priestley Committee as it was chaired by Lancelot John Priestley) which in 1992 determined the minimum academic study requirements for legal practice. The Priestley 11 list is set out in LACC, Uniform Admission Rules 2015, Schedule 1. A law degree or diploma will be recognised as a qualification for admission to practice only if every student has to study all of these subjects. However, the subjects do not have to be taught separately: it is sufficient if they are covered within the syllabus.

== Priestley 11 subjects—"Prescribed Areas of Knowledge" ==
- Administrative Law
- Civil Procedure
- Company Law
- Constitutional Law
- Contracts
- Criminal Law and Procedure
- Equity (including Trusts)
- Ethics and Professional Responsibility
- Evidence
- Property
- Torts

== Places offering Priestley 11 ==
Every law school in Australia has a prescribed course of study that involves the Priestley 11. Laws schools need not make them discrete subjects unto themselves, (eg, the law school can integrate one or more subjections within other subjects offered, or they may offer the subjects under the header of a different name, or they may even split a mandatory Priestley 11 subject into two or three subjects).
