= Alan Robertson (judge) =

Australian judge (born 1950)

The Honourable Alan Robertson AM SC
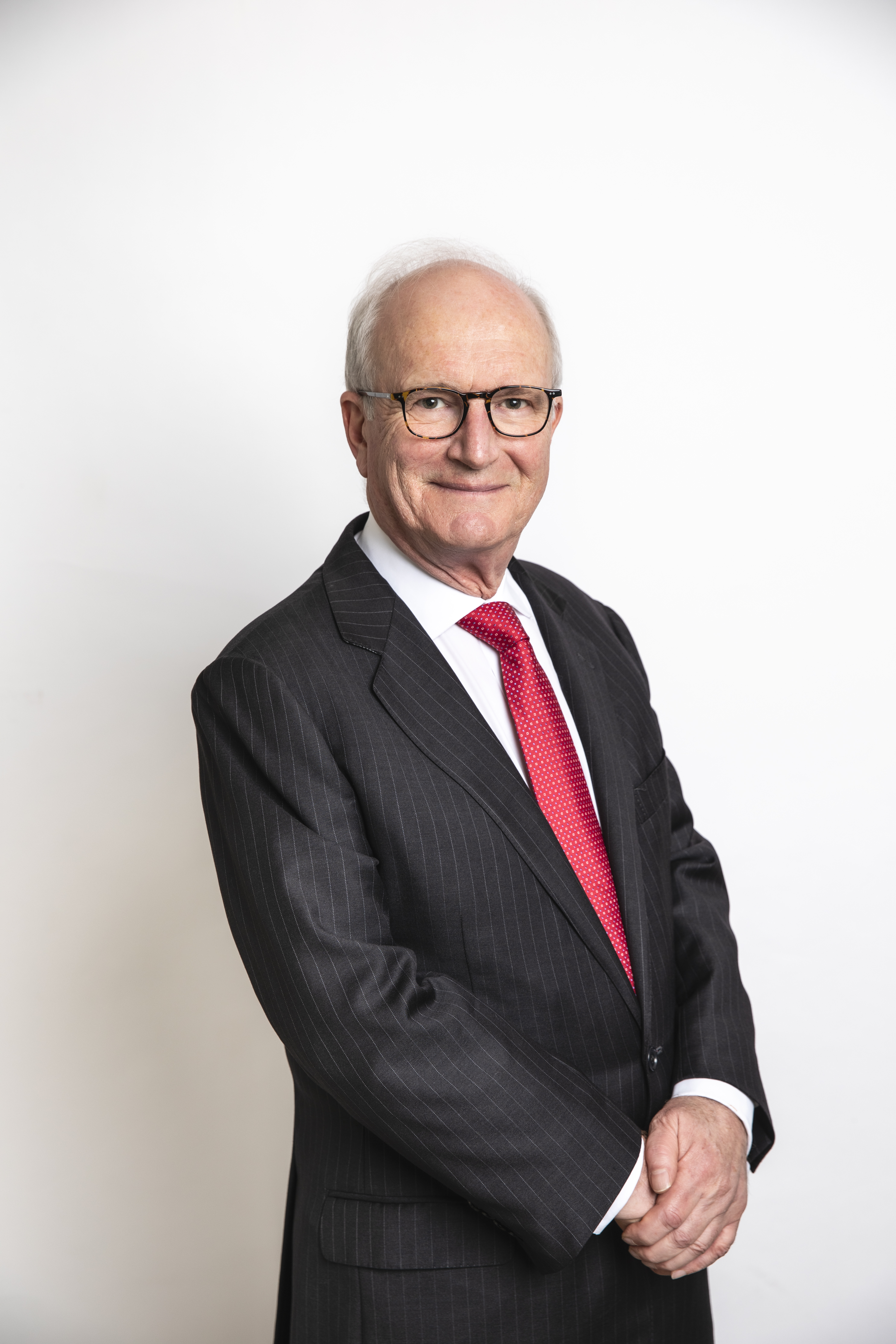

Justice of the Federal Court of Australia
- In office 11 April 2011 – 9 May 2020

Alan Robertson AM SC (born 10 May 1950) is a former judge of the Federal Court of Australia. He served as a deputy president of the Administrative Appeals Tribunal and of the Australian Competition Tribunal, and retired from the Court in May 2020 having reached the mandatory retirement age for federal judicial appointments.

== Early life and education ==
Robertson was born in Fareham in Hampshire, United Kingdom. His father, Captain David Robertson OBE, was a naval captain and a Director of Navy Legal Services in the Australian Department of Defence.

Robertson attended secondary school at Bradfield College in the UK. His great-grandfather was bishop Archibald Robertson, who had also attended Bradfield College in the late nineteenth century and whose own father was the physician Archibald Robertson.

Robertson graduated from the Australian National University with a Bachelor of Arts (Hons) in 1972. In early 1973, he joined the Commonwealth Public Service, as an Administrative Trainee, with placements at the Treasury, the Public Service Board and the Department of the Capital Territory.

== Legal career ==
Robertson began studying law, part-time, in 1976. He graduated Bachelor of Laws (Hons) in 1980. He attended the Legal Workshop at the ANU. Robertson was first admitted to practice in the Supreme Court of the Australian Capital Territory.

He commenced practice as a legal officer in the Attorney-General's Department, initially in the Deputy Crown Solicitor's Office, soon moving to the Advisings Division, working with Dennis Rose. Between 1981 and 1983 Robertson worked as assistant to the then-Commonwealth Solicitor-General, Sir Maurice Byers QC.

=== Barrister ===
In 1983 Robertson moved to the private bar in Sydney. He read with WMC Gummow. He was appointed Senior Counsel in 1995.

He was the convenor of the Administrative Law Section of the New South Wales Bar Association from 1995 to 2008 and convenor of the Constitutional and Administrative Law Section (now the Public Law Section) from 2008 to 2011. He was a part-time member of the Administrative Review Council between 1992 and 1997.

=== Judge ===
In 2011, Robertson was appointed to the Federal Court of Australia, based in Sydney.

He was appointed a Deputy President of the Administrative Appeals Tribunal and a Deputy President of the Australian Competition Tribunal.

Robertson retired from the Federal Court and from his tribunal roles on 9 May 2020, having reached the retiring age mandated by the Australian Constitution.

Significant cases in which Robertson sat as a judge include: a competition law case concerning the rule banning artificial insemination for thoroughbred racehorses; explaining circumstances in which findings of fact by an administrative tribunal may be challenged on judicial review; a number of native title determinations and a large transfer pricing tax case.

In 2019, Robertson was a Visiting Judicial Fellow at the Australian National University. He gave lectures as part of the ANU's Visiting Judges Program.

=== Post-judicial activities ===
On retiring from the Federal Court, Robertson resumed his membership of Fifth Floor St James' Hall, as an Associate Member.

Robertson was elected President of the Australian Academy of Law with effect from 1 July 2020.

In 2020, Robertson was appointed for a term of 5 years as an Honorary Professor at the College of Law, Australian National University.

In May 2020, Robertson was appointed by the Commissioner of the NDIS Quality and Safeguards Commission as Independent Reviewer into the commission's role in the circumstances that led to the death of an NDIS participant. He delivered his report on 31 August 2020, making 10 recommendations as to how the systems and framework governing the commission should be amended.

In November 2020, Robertson gave the 2020 Spigelman Oration to the New South Wales Bar Association. He spoke on the topic of Supervising the legal boundaries of executive powers. This has since been published.

In December 2021, Robertson was appointed to the part-time office of Deputy Chair of the New South Wales Electoral Commission for a term of 7 years.

In 2021, Robertson was appointed to be the Triennial Code Reviewer of the Code of Conduct for Copyright Collecting Societies. He delivered that Report on 21 March 2022.

He delivered a further report on 19 May 2025

In March 2022, Robertson was first appointed an independent legal arbiter by the President of the New South Wales Legislative Council under Standing Order 52 to evaluate and report on the validity of disputed claims of privilege over documents tabled under order of the House.

In the last quarter of 2022, Robertson was a member of the 3 person advisory panel set up by the Commonwealth Attorney-General to provide him with recommendations as to suitable candidates for possible appointment to the Federal Court of Australia.

In February 2023 Robertson was appointed a member of the "Expert Advisory Group to Guide Reform to Australia’s System of Administrative Review" chaired by the Hon. Patrick Keane AC KC.

In June 2024, Robertson was engaged by the Commonwealth to undertake a preliminary inquiry into the conduct of APS personnel involved in the management of recent litigation, in particular the non−disclosure of exculpatory material in post−sentence order proceedings concerning Mr Benbrika under Division 105A of the Criminal Code (Cth). That report was provided in August 2024 but will not be released publicly.

In August 2024 Robertson was engaged by the Inspector of the National Anti-Corruption Commission as a consultant to provide a report to her for the purposes of her Report into the National Anti-Corruption Commission's decision not to investigate referrals from the Royal Commission into the Robodebt Scheme. He delivered that report on 30 August 2024. It was later published.

In July 2024 Robertson was appointed under section 82 of the Government Sector Employment Act 2013 (NSW) by the Minister to conduct a Special Inquiry into certain matters concerning the State Insurance Regulatory Authority. He delivered that report on 6 December 2024. That report, and the Government response, was tabled in the New South Wales Parliament on 5 August 2025.

In August 2025 Robertson gave a paper at the International Judicial Conference on Integrity and Judicial Well-being, Port Moresby. The conference built on the goals of the Global Judicial Integrity Network, established by the United Nations Office on Drugs and Crime (UNODC) in 2018 and on the outcomes of the Regional Judicial Conference held in Nauru from 24 to 26 July 2024, and brought together judges, judicial authorities, and experts from around the world, with a particular emphasis on the Pacific region. Robertson's paper was entitled: 'Enhancing Judicial Effectiveness and Integrity through Well-Being: Necessary Shifts and Strategies'.

In September 2025 Robertson was commissoned by the Minister for Employment and Workplace Relations to investigate and report to her on a complaint made by Commissioner Hunt to the Minister in June 2025. That report was provided to the Minister in 2026.

He was appointed a Member of the Order of Australia in the 2025 Australia Day Honours for "significant service to the law, to the judiciary, and to the legal profession".
