= Académie Internationale de Droit Constitutionnel =

Constitutional law academy in Tunisia

The International Academy of Constitutional Law (IACL) or Académie Internationale de Droit Constitutionnel (AIDC) was founded in September 1981 in Belgrade, Yugoslavia (now Serbia). The overriding objective of IACL is to provide a forum in which constitutionalists from all parts of the world can begin to understand each other's systems, explain and reflect on their own, and engage in fruitful comparison, for a variety of purposes.

The official language of the academy is French. Its members come from more than 50 countries. The aim of the academy is to promote the study of constitutional law with an international approach, and by comparing different systems. IACL organizes the World Congress of Constitutional Law once every four years. The 2026 Congress took place in Bogotá, Colombia from 06 to 10 July.
