= John Bloomfield, 2nd Baron Bloomfield =

British peer and diplomatist

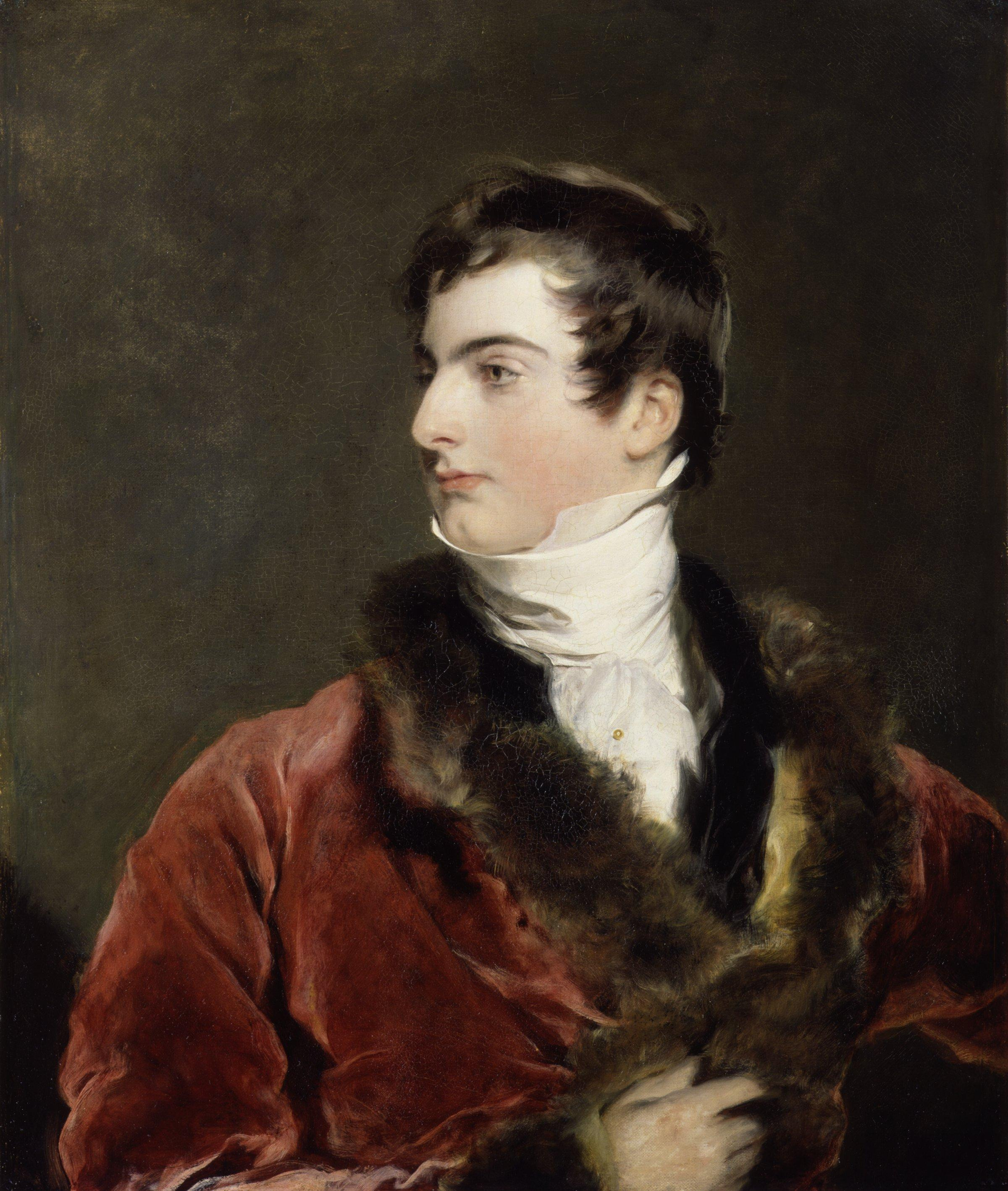
Portrait of John Bloomfield by Thomas Lawrence, 1819

John Arthur Douglas Bloomfield, 2nd Baron Bloomfield GCB PC DL (12 November 1802 – 17 August 1879) was a British peer and diplomatist.

== Background ==
Bloomfield was the eldest son of Benjamin Bloomfield, 1st Baron Bloomfield and his wife Hariott, the oldest daughter of Thomas Douglas, of Grantham.

== Career ==
From 1824, Bloomfield was attaché at Lisbon and was transferred as secretary of legation to Stuttgart in the following year. He was sent to Stockholm in 1826 and came as secretary of embassy to St Petersburg in 1839. Five years later, he was promoted to envoy. In 1846, he succeeded his father as baron and in 1848, he was awarded a Companion of the Order of the Bath (CB).

Bloomfield was appointed ambassador to Berlin in 1851 and on this occasion was advanced to a Knight Commander (KCB). In 1858, he was further honoured as a Knight Grand Cross (GCB). He reached his highest post as ambassador to Vienna in 1860 and was sworn of the Privy Council. . He represented Britain at many official functions, helped organize international conferences, and gathered information on Austria-Hungary, Prussia and nearby smaller nations, sending daily reports to London. He supported the British policy of noninvolvement and saw the Emperor as essential to the balance of power and stability in continental Europe. On his retirement in 1871, he was created Baron Bloomfield, of Ciamaltha in the County of Tipperary, this time in the Peerage of the United Kingdom, which entitled him to a seat in the House of Lords. He represented County Tipperary as a Deputy Lieutenant.

== Marriage and family ==
On 4 September 1845, Bloomfield had married Georgiana Liddell, the 16th and youngest child of Thomas Liddell, 1st Baron Ravensworth and a former maid of honour to Queen Victoria. The couple had no children. Lord Bloomfield had an extramarital daughter named Thecla born in 1833 by Swedish actress Emilie Högquist, and a son Albert whose birthdate is unknown. Albert was not mentioned after Emilie Högquist came under the protection of King Oscar I of Sweden.

== Death ==
John Arthur Douglas, Lord Bloomfield died without legitimate heir in 1879 at his home, Ciamhaltha, near Newport, County Tipperary and his titles became extinct. Bloomfield was buried in his family's vault at Borrisnafarney parish Church, beside the Loughton Demesne and Moneygall, in County Offaly. An impressive memorial exists in the church in his memory.

=== Bloomfield Mausoleum ===
The Borrisnafarney Parish Church in the Bloomfield Mausoleum, located 1.5 miles from the village of Moneygall beside the Loughton Estate in County Offaly, Ireland.

"The interior name plaques, that commemorate those who lie there, ensure that history will not forget them: they read 'Thomas Ryder Pepper 1828; Mrs Bloomfield 1828; Mrs Ryder Pepper 1841; Lieutenant General Benjamin Baron Bloomfield 1846;"

== Arms ==
Coat of arms of John Bloomfield, 2nd Baron Bloomfield

Crest
Out of a mural crown Or charged with two cinquefoils in fess Azure a bull's head Proper.
Escutcheon
Argent three lozenges in fess Gules between as many cinquefoils Azure on a canton of the last three ostrich feathers of the field issuing through the rim of a royal coronet Or.
Supporters
On either side a horse reguardant Argent their tails flowing between the hind legs each gorged with a chaplet of oak Proper the dexter charged on the shoulder with an escocheon Gules thereon a plume of feathers as on the canton in the shield and the sinister with an escocheon Or charged with a grenade Sable fired Proper.
Motto
Fortes Fortuna Juvat

Court offices
| Preceded by Frederick Turner | Page of Honour; 1816–1818 | Succeeded by Arthur Richard Wellesley |
Diplomatic posts
| Preceded by The Lord Stuart de Rothesay (as Ambassador) | British Minister to Russia; 1844 – 1851 | Succeeded by Sir George Seymour |
| Preceded by The Earl of Westmorland | British Minister to Prussia; 1851 – 1860 | Succeeded by Lord Augustus Loftus |
| Preceded by Lord Augustus Loftus | British Ambassador to Austria (Austria-Hungary from 1867); 1860 – 1871 | Succeeded by Sir Andrew Buchanan |
Peerage of Ireland
| Preceded by Benjamin Bloomfield | Baron Bloomfield; 1846 – 1879 | Extinct |
Peerage of the United Kingdom
| New creation | Baron Bloomfield; 1871 – 1879 | Extinct |
