= Thomas Faunce =

Australian bioethicist and researcher

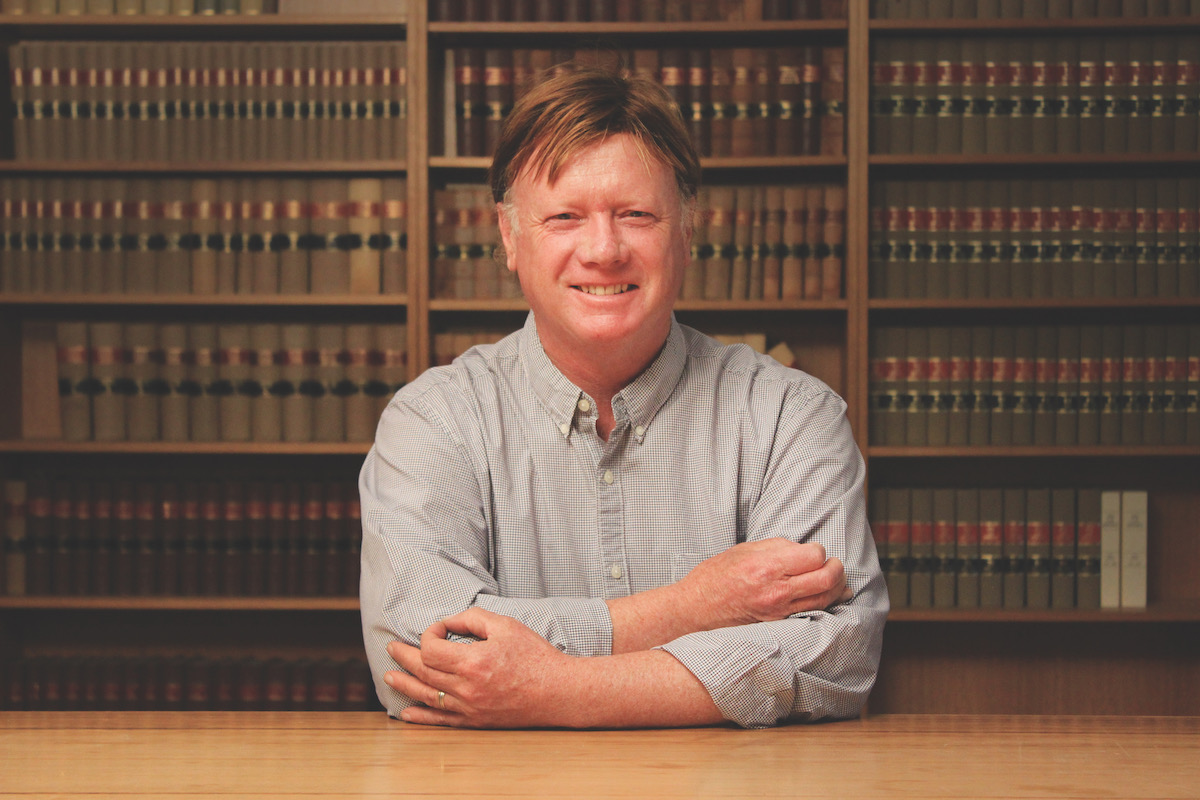
- Thomas Faunce, Phillipa Weekes Staff Library, ANU College of Law, 2015

Personal details
- Born: Thomas Alured Faunce; 8 August 1958 Canberra, Australia
- Died: 7 July 2019 (aged 60) Canberra, Australia
- Spouse: Rose Faunce (née Passos)
- Children: One son, Blake Faunce
- Education: The Australian National University
- Occupation: Academic, Doctor and Lawyer

Thomas Faunce (Thomas Alured Faunce) (1958–2019) was a professor at the Australian National University (ANU), Canberra, Australia. He practiced both law and medicine, and his professorship was a joint one, being in both the ANU College of Law and Medical School. His research spanned across health law, bioethics, the regulatory governance of pharmaceutical industry and artificial photosynthesis in addressing environment sustainability issues. He was awarded research funding from the Australian Research Council (ARC) for several Discovery Projects, and in 2009 was awarded a Future Fellowship to study nanotechnology and global public health.

== Early life and education ==
Born in Canberra, ACT, the eldest child of Marcus Faunce (1922–2004) and Marjorie Morison (1927–1995). Descendant of Alured Tasker Faunce (1808–1856) of Clifton, near Bristol, England, senior captain of the 4th (King's Own) Regiment who arrived in Sydney, New South Wales, in 1832, and was appointed the first salaried police magistrate in Queanbeyan, NSW, in 1837.

Thomas Faunce was educated at Canberra Grammar School, graduating in 1976, achieving first place in the New South Wales Higher School Certificate in Ancient History and English. He undertook a double Bachelor of Arts and Law (honours) at the Australian National University, graduating in 1982. While an undergraduate, he won prizes for contracts and air and space law, and was part of the Australian National University team that won the Philip C. Jessup International Law Moot Court Competition in Washington, D.C., on 25 April 1981. Faunce graduated from medicine at the University of Newcastle, New South Wales, in 1993. Faunce was conferred a Doctor of Philosophy by the Australian National University in 2001. His doctoral thesis, which reconceptualises the doctor-patient relationship, was awarded the J.G. Crawford Prize, and was developed into a book.

== Career ==
In 1983, Faunce was legal associate to Justice Lionel Murphy of the High Court of Australia, the year when the court was involved in significant decisions about Australian constitutional power in the case Commonwealth v Tasmania about the Franklin River dam, and the Australian constitutional meaning of religion in the appeal Church of the New Faith v. Commissioner of Pay-roll Tax. He practiced as a solicitor in commercial law for a few years then returned to university to study medicine. In 1993, he undertook graduate training in Emergency Medicine at Wagga Wagga Base Hospital, then enrolled in specialty training in Intensive Care, working as a registrar at the Canberra Hospital and at the Alfred Hospital, Melbourne. He published a popular study guide on anaesthetics and intensive care.

In 2002, Faunce accepted a dual appointment at the Australian National University in the College of Law and Medical School. Faunce served on the editorial board of the Journal of Medical Humanities (UK) and the Journal of Law and Medicine (Australia).

== Selected publications ==
- Faunce, T. (2004) Pilgrims in Medicine: Conscience, Legalism and Human Rights: An Allegory of Medical Humanities, Foundational Virtues, Ethical Principles, Law and Human Rights in Medical Personal and Professional Development. Brill Nijhoff.
- Faunce, T. A. (2005) "Will international human rights subsume medical ethics? Intersections in the UNESCO Universal Bioethics Declaration", Journal of Medical Ethics, v.31 (3), pp. 173–178.
- Faunce, T. A. (2005) "Nurturing personal and professional conscience in an age of corporate globalisation: Bill Viola's The Passions", Medical Journal of Australia, v.183 (11/12), pp. 599–601.
- Harvey, K. and Faunce, T. A. (2006) "A Critical Analysis of Overseas-Trained Doctor ('OTD') Factors in the Bundaberg Base Hospital Surgical Inquiry", Regulating Health Practitioners, Law in Context Series, 23, (2).
- Faunce, T. A. (2007) Who Owns Our Health?: Medical Professionalism, Law and Leadership Beyond the Age of the Market State. University of New South Wales Press.
- Faunce, T. A. (2007) "Abandoning the Common Law; Medical Negligence, Genetic Tests and Wrongful Life in the Australian High Court", Journal of Law and Medicine, 14, (4), pp. 469–477.
- Faunce, T. A. (2007) "'Linkage' Pharmaceutical Evergreening in Canada and Australia", Australia and New Zealand Journal of Health Policy, 14 (4), p. 8.
- Faunce, T. A. and Shats, K. (2007) "Researching Safety and Cost-Effectiveness in the Life Cycle of Nanomedicine", Journal of Law & Medicine, 15, pp. 128–135.
- Faunce, T. A. (2008) "New forms of evergreening in Australia: misleading advertising, enantiomers and data exclusivity: Apotex v Servier and Alphapharm v Lundbeck", Journal of Law and Medicine, 12 (2), pp. 220–232.
- Faunce, T. A., White, J. and Matthaei, K. I. (2008) "Integrated research into the nanoparticle–protein corona: a new focus for safe, sustainable and equitable development of nanomedicines", Nanomedicine, December 3 (6), pp. 859–866. doi: 10.2217/17435889.3.6.859
- Faunce, T. A. (2009) "Developing and teaching the virtue-ethics foundations of healthcare whistle blowing", Monash Bioethics Review, October 23 (4) pp. 56–59. doi: 10.1007/BF03351420.
- Faunce, T. A. (2009) "Abandoning the Common Law; Medical Negligence, Genetic Tests and Wrongful Life in the Australian High Court", Journal of Law and Medicine, 14 (4), pp. 469–477.
- Faunce, T. A. and Nasu, H. (2010) "Nanotechnology and the International Law of Weaponry: Towards International Regulation of Nano-Weapons", Journal of Law, Information and Technology, 20, pp. 21–54.
- Faunce, T. A., Bai, J., and Nguyen, D. (2010) "Impact of the Australia—US Free Trade Agreement on Australian Medicines Regulation and Prices", Journal of Generic Medicines, 7 (1), pp. 18–29. doi: 10.1057/jgm.2009.40
- Faunce, T. A. and McEwan, A. (2010) "The High Court's Lost Chance in Medical Negligence", Journal of Law & Medicine, 18 (2), pp. 275–283.
- Faunce, T. A., Townsend, R. and McEwan, A. (2010) "The Vioxx pharmaceutical scandal: Peterson v Merke Sharpe & Dohme (Aust) Pty Ltd (2010) 184 FCR 1", Journal of Law and Medicine, 18, pp. 38–49.
- Faunce, T. A. and Watal, A. (2010) "Nanosilver and Global Public Health: International Regulatory Issues", Nanomedicine, 5, (4), pp. 617–632.
- Faunce, T. A. and Townsend, R. (2010) "Trans Pacific Partnership Agreement - Public Health and Medicines Policies" in Kelsey, J. ed., No ordinary deal : unmasking the Trans-Pacific Partnership Free Trade Agreement, Allen & Unwin, p. 149-162.
- Faunce, T. A. and Townsend, R. (2011) "The Trans-Pacific Partnership Agreement: challenges for Australian health and medicine policies", Medical Journal of Australia, 2 (194), pp. 83–86.
- Faunce, T. A. and Patel, J. (2012) "Re Edwards: Who Owns a Dead Man’s Sperm?", Journal of Medical Law, 19, (3), pp. 479–489.
- Faunce, T. A. (2012) "Plain Packaging in a Broader Regulatory Framework: Preventing False Claims and Investor State Lobbying" in Voon, T., and Mitchell, A. D., Liberman, J. and Ayres, G. (eds) Public Health and Plain Packaging of Cigarettes: Legal Issues, Edward Elgar, pp. 200–213.
- Faunce, T. A. (2012) Nanotechnology for a sustainable world : global artificial photosynthesis as nanotechnology's moral culmination. Edward Elgar.
- Faunce, T.A., Styring, S., Wasielewski, M., Brudvig, G., Rutherford, B., Messinger, J., Lee, A., Hill, C., deGroot, H., and Fontecave, M., MacFarlane, D., Hankamer, B., Nocera, D., Tiede, D., Dau, H., Hillier, W., Wang, L. and Amal, R. (2013) "Artificial Photosynthesis as a Frontier Technology for Energy Sustainability", Energy Environmental Science, The Royal Society of Chemistry. doi: 10.1039/c3ee40534f
- Vines, T., Bruce, A. and Faunce, T. (2013) "Planetary medicine and the Waitangi Tribunal Whanganui River report: global health law embracing ecosystem as patients", Journal of Law and Medicine 20 (3), pp. 528–541.
- Faunce, T. A. (2015) "Australia's embrace of investor state dispute settlement: a challenge to the social contract ideal?", Australian Journal Of International Affairs, 69 (5), pp. 1–15. doi: 10.1080/10357718.
- Faunce, T. (2015) "Alured Tasker Faunce, William Davis and Early Cricket in the Queanbeyan-Canberra Region", Canberra Historical Journal, March (74), pp. 1–14.
- Faunce, T. and Walmsley M. (2016) Sustainocene. Beautiful World From Global Artificial Photosynthesis, Music CD, Sydney.
- Farrar, M. and Faunce T. A. (2017) "The Essendon Football Club Supplements Saga: Exploring Natural Justice for Team Sanctions within Anti-Doping Regulations", Journal of Law and Medicine, 24, pp. 565–575.
- Faunce, T. A. (2018) Split by Sun: The Tragic History of the Sustainocene. World Scientific Publishing Europe.
- Durant, S. and Faunce, T. A. (2018) "Analysis of Australia's New Biosecurity Legislation", Journal of Law and Medicine, 25 (3), pp. 647–654.
- Byrne, S., Gock, A., Cowling, A. and Faunce, T. A. (2018) "Australia’s First Official Illicit Pill Testing at Testing at Canberra’s Groovin’ The Moo Music Festival: Legal Hurdles and Future Prospects", Canberra’s Groovin’ The Moo Music Festival: Legal Hurdles and Future Prospects", Journal of Law and Medicine, 64, pp. 54–60.
