= Posesi Bloomfield =

Marshallese politician

Sione Posesi Fanua Bloomfield (born August 16, 1974) is the former Attorney General of the Republic of the Marshall Islands.

== Education and career ==
Posesi Bloomfield received his Bachelor of Arts (BA) and Bachelor of Laws (LLB) degree from the Australian National University College of Law in Canberra, Australia. After ten years of public service throughout the Pacific region, he went on to obtain his Masters of Public Administration degree from Harvard University in Cambridge, Massachusetts.

Prior to attending Harvard University, Bloomfield served as the attorney general of the Marshall Islands. Before this, Bloomfield served as crown counsel in the Kingdom of Tonga, as well as assistant secretary of marine and ports.

== Harvard Graduate Council ==
While at Harvard, Bloomfield was elected to represent the Harvard's Kennedy School of Government in the Harvard Graduate Council. He was also an elected member of the Kennedy School Student Government. He was awarded a fellowship with the Harvard Ash Foundation for Democratic Governance and Innovation, and was a fellow of the Edward S. Mason Program.

Bloomfield was a founding member of the Pacific International Maritime Law Association, and a member of the bar in Tonga, the Marshall Islands, and Australia.
