= Benjamin Bloomfield, 1st Baron Bloomfield =

British Army general (1768–1846)

Lieutenant-General The Right Honourable The Lord Bloomfield GCB GCH PC
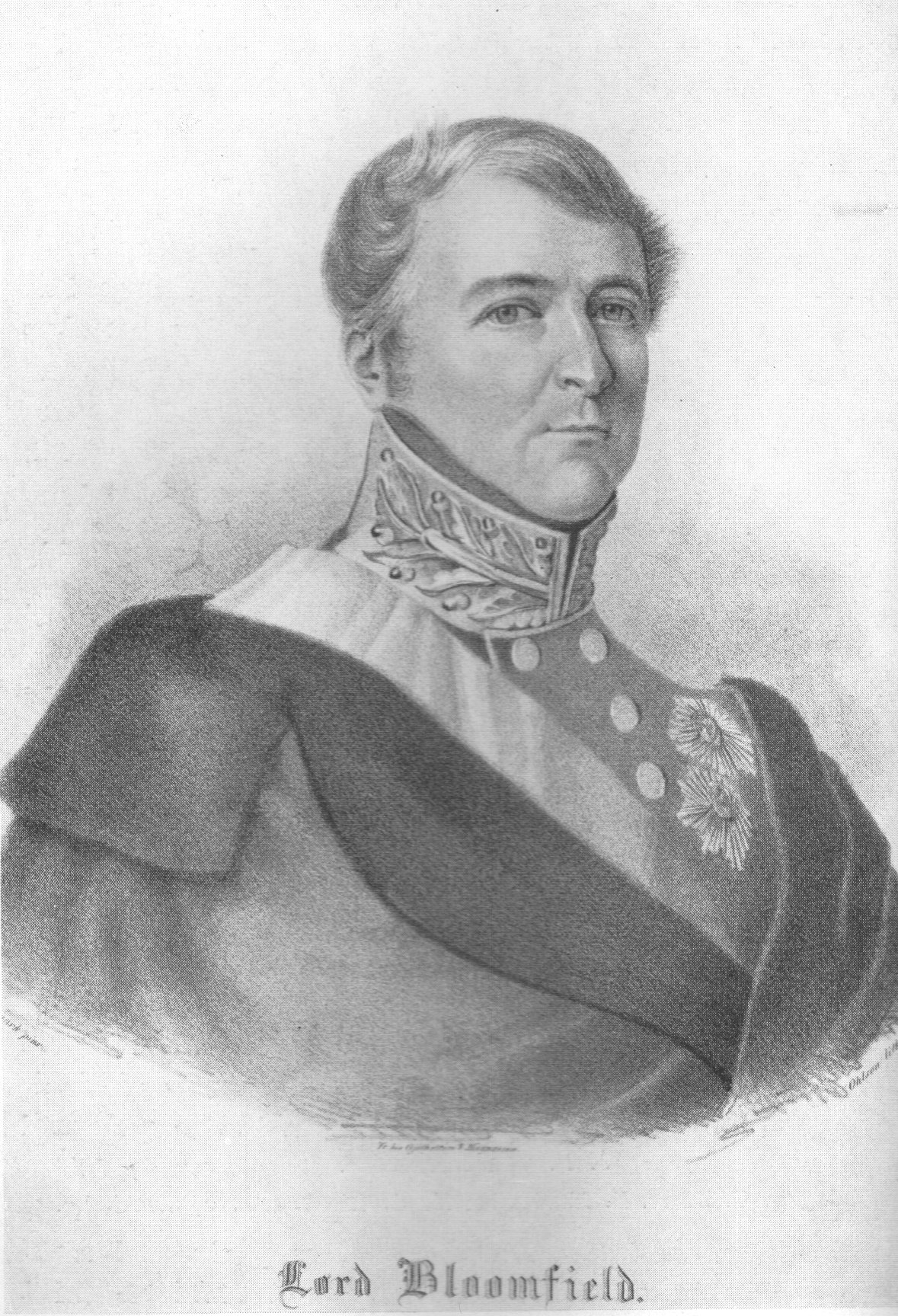

Private Secretary to the Sovereign
- In office 1817–1822
- Preceded by: Sir John McMahon, 1st Baronet
- Succeeded by: William Knighton

Personal details
- Born: 13 April 1768
- Died: 15 August 1846 (aged 78)
- Education: Royal Military Academy, Woolwich

Lieutenant-General Benjamin Bloomfield, 1st Baron Bloomfield, GCB, GCH, PC (13 April 1768 – 15 August 1846) was a British Army officer who saw action at the Battle of Vinegar Hill in June 1798 during the Irish Rebellion. He was Member of Parliament (MP) for Plymouth from 1812 from 1818 and served as Private Secretary to the Sovereign from 1817 to 1822 before becoming Commanding Officer of Woolwich Garrison in 1826.

== Early career ==
Bloomfield was born in 1768, the son of John Bloomfield and Anne Charlotte Waller, and educated at the Royal Military Academy Woolwich. He was commissioned as a second lieutenant in the Royal Artillery in 1781. After seeing action at the Battle of Vinegar Hill in June 1798 during the Irish Rebellion, he served in Newfoundland, Gibraltar, and at Brighton in 1806, where, as a brevet major, he was in charge of a troop of the Royal Horse Artillery. He was also appointed a Gentleman in Waiting to the King that year. Promoted to major-general on 4 June 1814, he served as Member of Parliament (MP) for Plymouth from 1812 from 1818 and was made a Privy Councillor on 19 July 1817.

== Private Secretary to George IV ==
He was an Aide-de-Camp, then Chief Equerry and Clerk Marshal to the Prince of Wales and finally was Private Secretary to the King, Keeper of the Privy Purse, and Receiver of the Duchy of Cornwall from 1817 to 1822. One of issues that Bloomfield had to contend with as Private Secretary was King's extravagant spending. This led to Parliamentary discussions about possible reforms to the civil list.

The King and Lady Conyngham's dislike of Bloomfield, as he tried to curb the King's excesses, became evident on the King's trip to Scotland on 10 August 1822, as the rising star of the King's entourage, Sir William Knighton, was situated next to the King's cabin, whilst Bloomfield was rather coldly relegated to a cabin far further away. Furthermore, Conyngham encouraged her son, Francis, to shoulder some of Bloomfield's responsibilities, much to Bloomfield's obvious displeasure. There was even a rumour that some of Lady Conyngham's jewels belonged to the Crown, a fact known by Bloomfield, and therefore the royal mistress felt compelled to have him removed. As Bloomfield began to be undermined by Sir William Knighton and Francis Conyngham, his self-confidence started to fade, his grip on the royal purse was weakened and he abruptly had his salary stopped by royal command- his demise was imminent. In an act of desperation he began to lobby Parliament, claiming 'royal betrayal', however, this was ineffective as Lady Conyngham's family were attached to Bloomfield's target audience- the Whig opposition- and therefore his pleas fell on deaf ears.

Bloomfield's downfall was hastened further by a royal visit to Dublin in 1821. In one incident, the King visited a local theatre, and believing Bloomfield to be an important member of the King's party, the manager began playing the national anthem as Bloomfield entered his box, responding by bowing and smiling jokingly as the crowd rose and began singing 'God Save the King' (believing Bloomfield to be a member of the royal family). The King, noted for his sense of humour, was unusually furious at this act, declaring it an insult. Another plausible explanation for Bloomfield's demise is provided by a courtier, Sir William Freemantle in a letter to the Duke of Buckingham. The King's expenses from the spring of 1822 showed a considerable amount of money had been spent on an undisclosed item, which Bloomfield revealed to be the purchase of diamonds by the King. The King considered this to be damaging, and showed beyond all doubt that Bloomfield had lost his ability to protect the King's image at all costs. The diamonds were most probably for the royal mistress, an assertion which the media exposed. In a last humiliating episode for Bloomfield, he was ordered by the King to pay J.L. Marks a sum of £45 to prevent the publication of a cartoon which implicated the King and his mistress in the diamond affair, after Marks sent a copy to the King's residence before its publication. Marks duly ripped up the plate before his eyes, despite having made copies sneakily beforehand. In fact Bloomfield had spent a fortune buying up caricatures.

Finally, to the relief of the King, ministers agreed that Bloomfield should be removed from his position. The King wrote to Lord Liverpool, asking for the post of Private Secretary to be abolished to make Bloomfield's departure appear to be a matter of politics rather than the Crown. Bloomfield was offered the Governorship of Ceylon as compensation, or his current salary for life and the Order of the Bath. Bloomfield felt that his efforts deserved at the very least an English peerage, the King however flew into a rage when hearing Bloomfield's demand, threatening to have him alienated from society, just as his wife had been. Bloomfield pragmatically refused the position of Governor of Ceylon, but accepted the Order of the Bath, a sinecure worth £650 per annum and the Governorship of Fort Charles in Jamaica, that he would later exchange for the post of Minister at Stockholm, where he served from 1823 to 1832. The King invited him to the Royal Pavilion at Brighton one last time to receive the Order of the Bath from the King, but thought better of it, and did not journey to meet his former royal master for the last time.

Bloomfield was knighted on 12 December 1815, appointed a Knight Grand Cross of the Order of the Bath on 1 April 1822 and became Colonel Commandant of the Royal Artillery on 21 February 1824. He was also ennobled in the peerage of Ireland as Lord Bloomfield on 11 May 1825. He became Commanding Officer of the garrison at Woolwich in 1826.

Following his turbulent years in service to the King, Bloomfield unexpectedly embraced the values of Methodism and became a devout Christian. His house in Portman Square, London amused many a passer-by as he would often have a placard on his front door, adorned with the words 'At Prayer'. He was promoted to lieutenant general on 22 July 1830 and died in Ireland in 1846. He was buried at Borrisnafarney Parish Church in the Bloomfield Mausoleum in County Offaly, Ireland which is located 1.5 miles from the village of Moneygall beside the Loughton Estate

== Family ==
Bloomfield married Harriott Douglas, daughter of Thomas Douglas, on 7 September 1797. They had a son, John Arthur Douglas Bloomfield, 2nd Baron Bloomfield of Ciamhaltha (1802–1879) who was created Baron Bloomfield, of Ciamhaltha in the County of Tipperary, in the Peerage of the United Kingdom, on his retirement as British Ambassador to Austria, and three daughters, Charlotte, Georgina and Harriott. Harriott Mary Anne Bloomfield married on 5 June 1833 Colonel Thomas Henry Kingscote (b. 19 Jan 1799, d. 19 Dec 1861).

== Arms ==
Coat of arms of Benjamin Bloomfield, 1st Baron Bloomfield

Crest
Out of a mural crown Or charged with two cinquefoils in fess Azure a bull's head Proper.
Escutcheon
Argent three lozenges in fess Gules between as many cinquefoils Azure on a canton of the last three ostrich feathers of the field issuing through the rim of a royal coronet Or.
Supporters
On either side a horse reguardant Argent their tails flowing between the hind legs each gorged with a chaplet of oak Proper the dexter charged on the shoulder with an escocheon Gules thereon a plume of feathers as on the canton in the shield and the sinister with an escocheon Or charged with a grenade Sable fired Proper.
Motto
Fortes Fortuna Juvat

== Sources ==
- Bloomfield, B. (1884). Memoir of Benjamin, Lord Bloomfield, G.C.B., G.C.H, Vol I and II, edited by Georgiana, Lady Bloomfield. London : Chapman and Hall, Limited.
- Hamilton, Lady Anne (1832). Secret history of the court of England from the accession of George the Third to the death of George the Fourth, including among other important matters, full particulars of the death of Princess Charlotte. William Henry Sevenson.
- Smith, E. A. (2000). George IV. Yale University. ISBN 978-0300088021.

Parliament of the United Kingdom
Preceded by Thomas Tyrwhitt; Sir Charles Pole	Member of Parliament for Plymouth; 1812–1818; With: Sir Charles Pole	Succeeded by Sir William Congreve; Sir Charles Pole
Court offices
Preceded by Sir John McMahon	Private Secretary to the Sovereign; Keeper of the Privy Purse; 1817–1822	Succeeded by Sir William Knighton
Peerage of Ireland
New creation	Baron Bloomfield; 1825–1846	Succeeded by John Bloomfield
