= Australian Academy of Law =

The Australian Academy of Law (AAL) is a permanent, non-government organisation devoted to the advancement of the discipline of law. It comprises individuals of exceptional distinction from all parts of the legal community, including academia, the practising profession, and the judiciary.

== History ==
The Academy was established on 17 July 2007, following recommendations made in the Australian Law Reform Commission's report, Managing Justice: A Review of the Federal Civil Justice System.

== Description ==
The Australian Academy of Law (AAL) is a permanent, non-government organisation devoted to the advancement of the discipline of law. According to its Constitution, According to its Constitution, the Australian Academy of Law comprises individuals of exceptional distinction from all parts of the legal community, including academia, the practising profession (including private and public sector lawyers), and the judiciary.

The Academy is registered under the Australian Charities and Not-for-profits Commission Act 2012 (Cth). The Academy was a Deductible Gift Recipient until 30 June 2025, specifically listed in Division 30 of the Income Tax Assessment Act 1997 (Cth). That specific listing has now been renewed for gifts made after 30 June 2026 and before 1 July 2031. Donations to the AAL are therefore once again tax deductible.

== Patrons ==
The foundation patron of the Academy was Murray Gleeson, Chief Justice of Australia.

The second patron of the Academy was Robert French, Chief Justice of Australia.

The third patron of the Academy was Chief Justice Susan Kiefel.

The fourth and present patron of the Academy is Chief Justice Stephen Gageler AC, Chief Justice of Australia.

== Presidents ==
The first President of the Academy, from 2008, was the Hon Robert Nicholson AO KCSJ.

From 2011 to 2020 the President was the Hon Kevin Lindgren AM KC.

The current President is the Hon Alan Robertson AM SC (with effect from 1 July 2020).

== Foundation Fellows ==
When the Academy was founded in 2007 there were 36 Foundation Fellows, who were, in alphabetical order:

- David Barker
- Larissa Behrendt
- Her Excellency Quentin Bryce AC
- Henry Burmester AO QC
- Donald RC Chalmers
- Hilary Charlesworth
- Justice Terry Connolly
- Michael Coper
- Rosalind Croucher
- Andrea Durbach
- Paul Fairall
- Glenn Ferguson
- Justice Robert French
- Judge John Goldring
- Justice Susan Kenny
- Justice Susan Kiefel
- Justice Kevin Lindgren
- Justice Margaret McMurdo
- Marcia Neave AO
- Justice Robert Nicholson AO
- Dr Melissa Perry QC
- Justice Ronald Sackville
- Cheryl Saunders AO
- Justice Ralph Simmonds
- Justice Stephen Southwood
- Justice Margaret Stone
- Pamela M Tate SC
- Margaret Thornton
- Anne Trimmer
- The Hon John von Doussa
- Bret Walker SC
- Louis Waller AO
- Kate Warner
- Justice Mark Weinberg
- David Weisbrot
- Justice Margaret White

== Fellows ==
The Academy consists of an elected Fellowship which includes 10 Life Fellows, some 430 Fellows and 20 Overseas Fellows as at November 2025.

The Life Fellows, in alphabetical order, are:

- David Barker AM
- The Hon Dame Quentin Bryce AC, CVO
- The Hon Robert French AC
- The Hon Chief Justice Stephen Gageler AC
- The Hon Murray Gleeson AC, GBS
- The Hon Susan Kiefel AC KC
- The Hon Kevin Lindgren AM, KC
- The Hon Robert Nicholson AO, KCSJ
- David Weisbrot AM

== Directors ==
The current 2026-2027 directors are:

- The Hon Alan Robertson AM SC
- The Hon Justice Anthony Besanko KC
- Emeritus Professor Bee Chen Goh
- Emeritus Professor David Barker AM
- The Hon Kevin Lindgren AM KC
- The Hon G John Digby KC
- The Hon Justice Joshua Thomson
- The Hon Duncan Kerr AO Chev LH
- The Hon Mary Finn
- The Hon Pamela Tate AM KC
- Professor Natalie Skead
- Philip Chung AM
- The Hon John Bond
- The Hon Jenny Blokland

== Officeholders ==
The Academy's current officeholders are:

- President: The Hon Alan Robertson AM SC
- Deputy President: The Hon Anthony Besanko KC
- Treasurer: Emeritus Professor Bee Chen Goh
- Secretary: Emeritus Professor David Barker AM

== Committees ==
The Academy has the following Board Committees:

- Prizes and Scholarships Committee
- Research and Expenditure Committee
- Events Committees
- Website and Communications Committee
- Governance Committee
- Membership Committee
- Finance Committee

There is also an Event Organising Committee in each state and territory.

== Prizes and scholarships ==
The Australian Academy of Law awards an annual essay prize of AU$10,000. It was inaugurated in 2015. In 2026 in recognition of his work as chair of the judging panel from 2015 to 2026 and in memory of him, the annual essay prize was renamed the AAL William Gummow Essay Prize.

In 2026, the essay topic was "Section 51(xxxi) of the Commonwealth Constitution confers power on the Commonwealth Parliament to make laws with respect to the acquisition of property on just terms from any State or person for any purpose in respect of which the Parliament has power to make laws. What is the relationship between s 51(xxxi) and: (1) the other powers under s 51; and (2) the rest of the Constitution? Has the 2025 trilogy of cases, Commonwealth v Yunupingu [2025] HCA 6, G Global 120 TE Pty Ltd v Commissioner of State Revenue (Qld) [2025] HCA 39, Russian Federation v Commonwealth [2025] HCA 44, resolved that relationship? Do you agree?"

There were 43 entries. The winning essay was submitted by Mr Rory O'Sullivan who works as a solicitor in Perth.

The winning essay is published in the Australian Law Journal.

Prize winners from 2015 to 2026 are listed on the Academy's website.

The Academy also awards annually the Michael Coper Memorial Prize of $2,000 to the winner of the Paper Presentation Competition conducted by the Australian Law Students' Association at the Australian and New Zealand Law Honours Conference.

In 2021, the AAL offered for the first time the Australian Academy of Law First Nations Scholarship tenable in 2021 for a First Nations final year law student.

The First Nations Scholar for 2021 was Mikeyli Hendry, a student at the University of Adelaide.

The First Nations Scholar for 2022 was Lillian Ireland, a student at the Australian National University.

The First Nations Scholar for 2023 was Georgia Fryer, a member of the Cubbitch Barta clan of the Dharawal nation and a final year law student at the University of Sydney majoring in Socio-Legal Studies.

The First Nations Scholar for 2024 was UNSW student Kyle Fox, a Wiradjuri man currently in his final year at UNSW studying for a Bachelor of Law and Criminology and Criminal Justice.

The First Nations Scholar for 2025 was Rikisha Phineasa, a Torres Strait Islander woman who is a final year law student at James Cook University.

The First Nations Scholar for 2026 was Amos Taylor, a proud descendant of the Gija and Jaru peoples of the Eastern Kimberley, who is a final year law student at the University of New South Wales.

The amount of the award is now $6,000. Applications are through nominations by the respective Law Deans. The selection criteria are on the AAL's website.
