= Baron Bloomfield =

Extinct barony in the Peerage of the United Kingdom

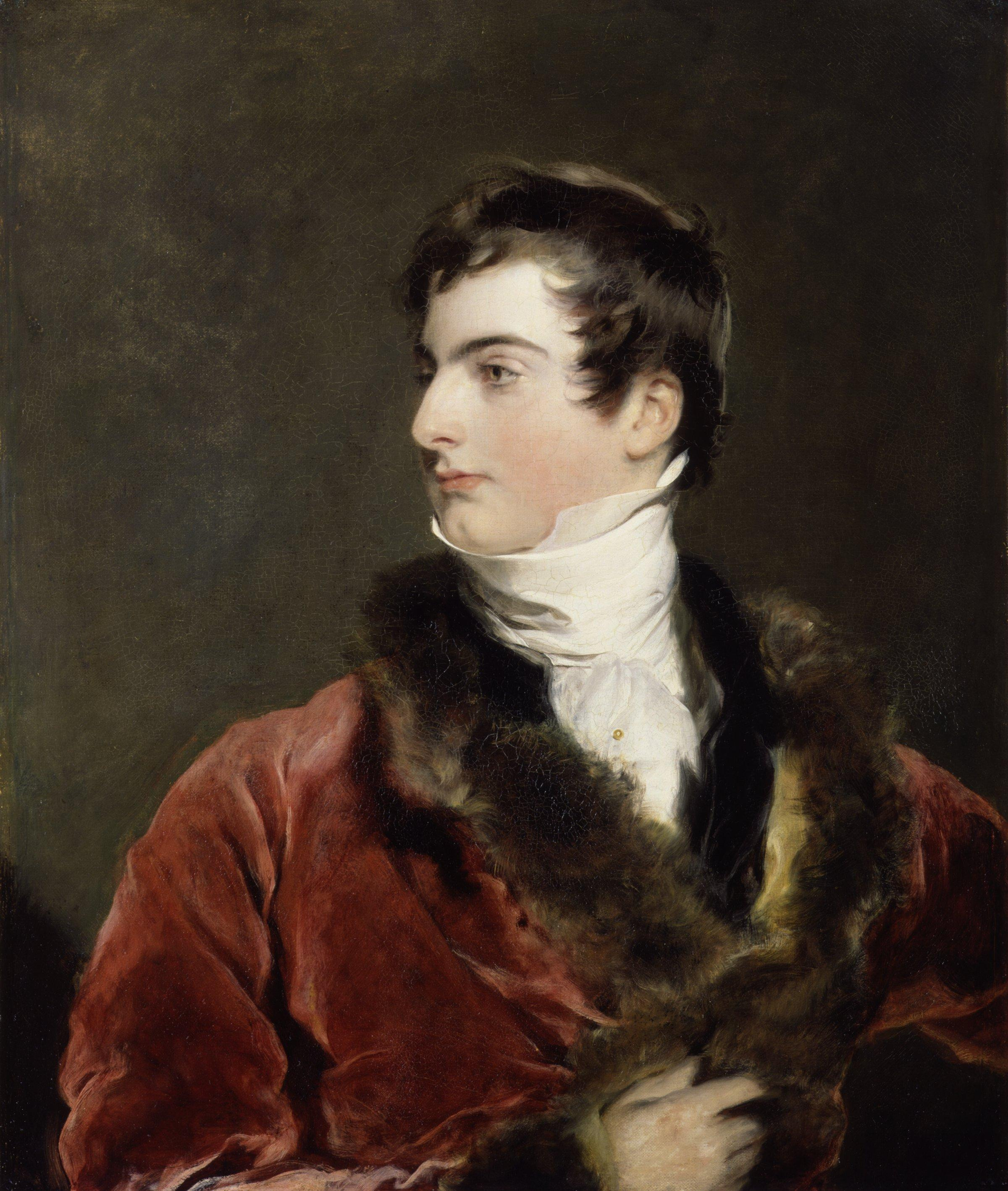
John Bloomfield, 2nd Baron Bloomfield.

Baron Bloomfield, of Oakhampton and Redwood in the County of Tipperary, was a title in the Peerage of Ireland. It was created in 1825 for Lieutenant-General Sir Benjamin Bloomfield, an Irish-born British soldier, diplomat, politician and court official. In 1871 his son, the second Baron, was created Baron Bloomfield, of Ciamhaltha in the County of Tipperary, in the Peerage of the United Kingdom, on his retirement as British Ambassador to Austria. However, both titles became extinct upon the latter's death in 1879.

== Barons Bloomfield (1825) ==
- Benjamin Bloomfield, 1st Baron Bloomfield (1762–1846)
- John Arthur Douglas Bloomfield, 2nd Baron Bloomfield (1802–1879)

== Arms ==
Coat of arms of Baron Bloomfield

Crest
Out of a mural crown Or charged with two cinquefoils in fess Azure a bull's head Proper.
Escutcheon
Argent three lozenges in fess Gules between as many cinquefoils Azure on a canton of the last three ostrich feathers of the field issuing through the rim of a royal coronet Or.
Supporters
On either side a horse reguardant Argent their tails flowing between the hind legs each gorged with a chaplet of oak Proper the dexter charged on the shoulder with an escocheon Gules thereon a plume of feathers as on the canton in the shield and the sinister with an escocheon Or charged with a grenade Sable fired Proper.
Motto
Fortes Fortuna Juvat
