= Georgiana Bloomfield, Baroness Bloomfield =

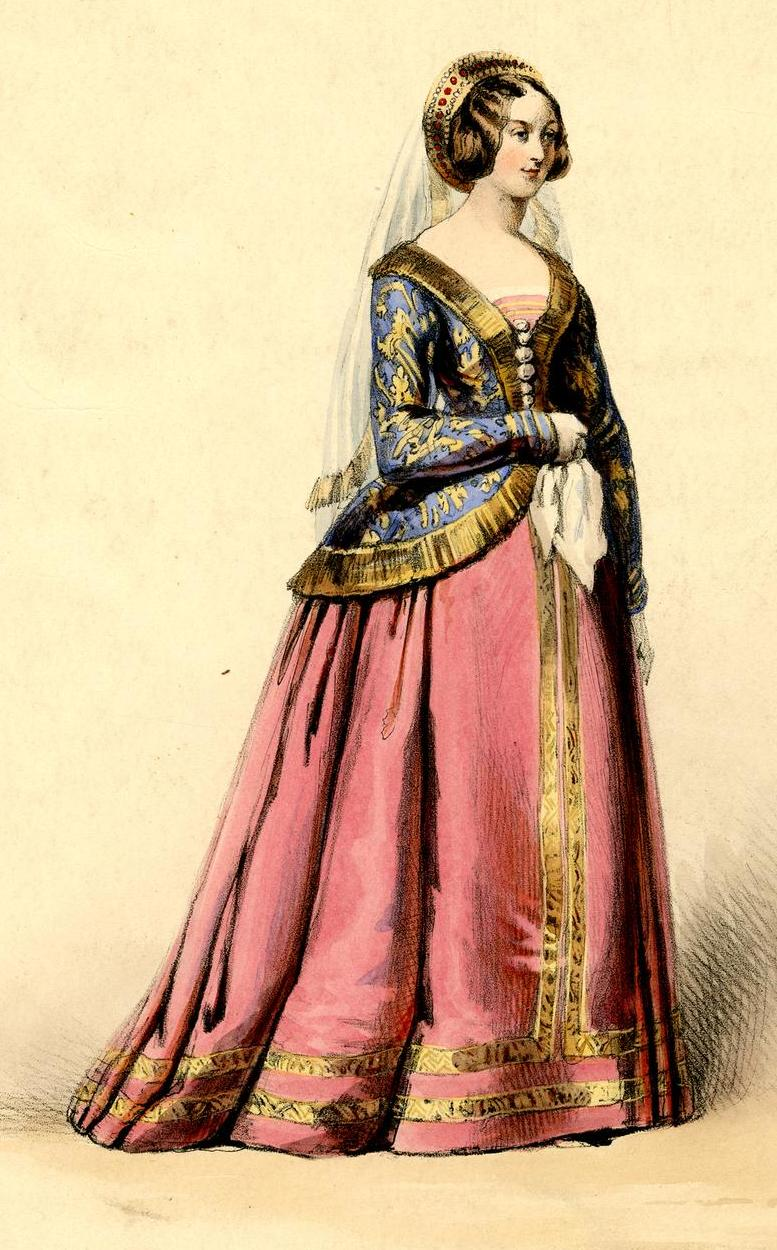
Georgiana Liddell, dressed for a ball in 1843

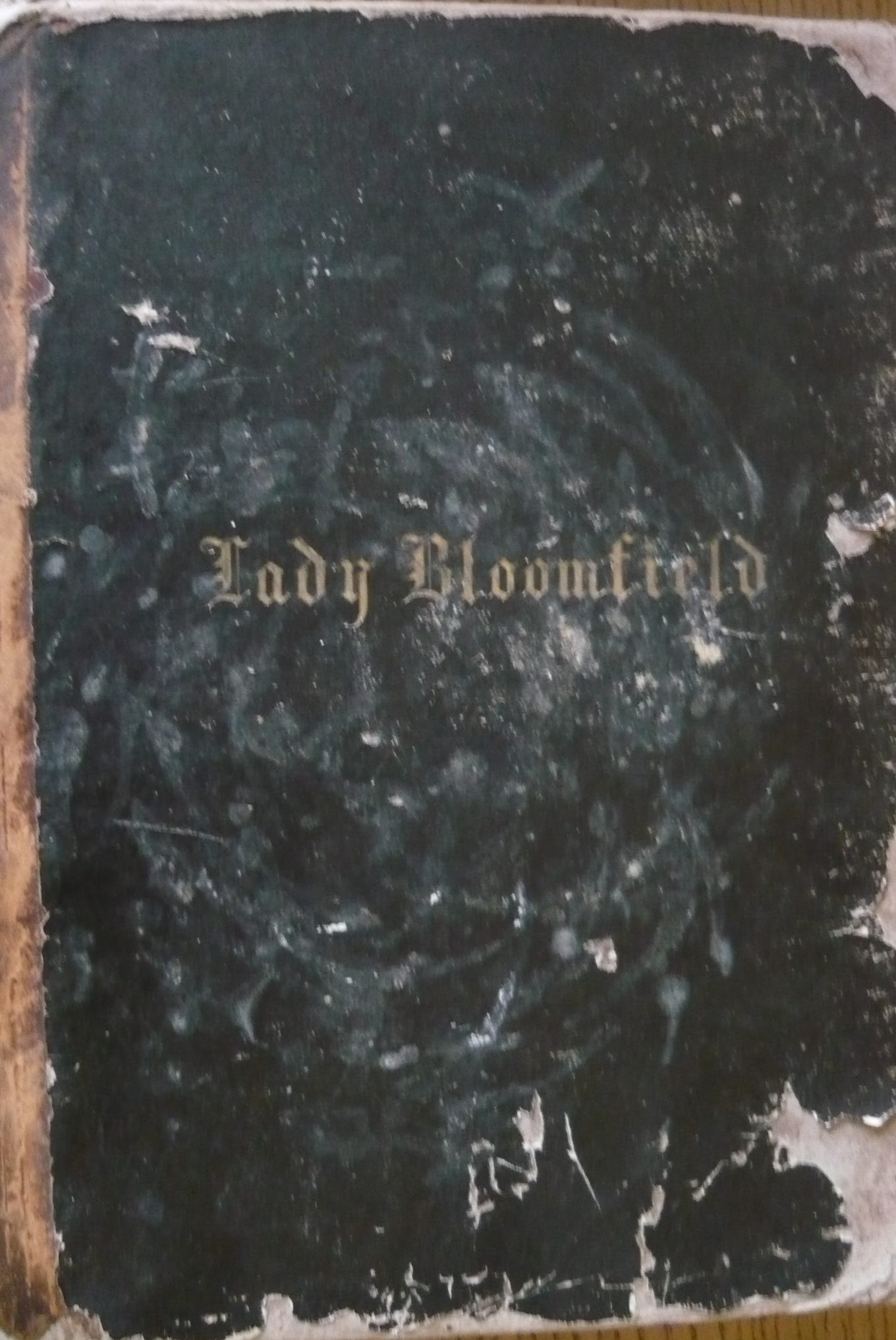
Lady Bloomfield Piano Album contains first/early editions (21 in total) of Frédéric Chopin major piano works. Source: Jozef Kapustka – "Chopin i Lady Bloomfield" http://jozef.kapustka.salon24.pl/690681,chopin-i-lady-bloomfield

Georgiana Bloomfield, Baroness Bloomfield (née Liddell; 13 April 1822 – 21 May 1905), was a British courtier and author.

== Life ==
Georgiana Liddell was born at 51 Portland Place, London, the youngest child of Thomas Liddell, 1st Baron Ravensworth (1775–1855), and his wife, Maria Susannah Simpson (c.1773–1845), who was sister-in-law to the Marquess of Normanby. She was educated at home and in December 1841 became a maid of honour to Queen Victoria She resigned that position in July 1845 and married the diplomat John Bloomfield, 2nd Baron Bloomfield, on 4 September 1845 at St Andrew's, Lamesley, the parish church of her family home. She joined her husband on his diplomatic delegations, to Hamburg and then St Petersburg shortly after her marriage, to Berlin (1851–60), and to Vienna (1861–71). There were no children of the marriage, and after her husband's death at his residence in Newport, County Tipperary, in 1879, Lady Bloomfield settled at Shrivenham, then in Berkshire, to be near her sister, Jane Elizabeth, widow of the sixth Viscount Barrington. When Lady Barrington died in 1883, Lady Bloomfield moved to Bramfield House, about two miles from Hertford. Here she exercised much hospitality and interested herself in the affairs of the village.

In 1883 she published Reminiscences of Court and Diplomatic Life (2 volumes), 'a constant ripple of interesting anecdote,' as Augustus Hare described Lady Bloomfield's conversation (cf. Story of My Life, 1900, vol. vi.). She edited in 1884 a Memoir of Benjamin, Lord Bloomfield, her father-in-law, in 2 volumes. Her last work, Gleanings of a Long Life (1902), collected extracts from her favourite books.

Lady Bloomfield, a 'grand dame' of an old school, kept up her friendship with Queen Victoria and her family, and delighted in social intercourse with all classes. While deeply religious on old, low church lines, she was tolerant and charitable. She founded in 1874 the Trained Nurses' Annuity Fund, and built and endowed almshouses on her husband's estate near Newport. She sketched well in water-colours, and her sketches formed a sort of diary of her journeys. She was an accomplished musician, playing the organ; was a good billiard player, and an excellent gardener.

== Death ==
She died, after a long illness, at Bramfield House on 21 May 1905, and was buried in the family mausoleum beside her husband in the churchyard of Borrisnafarney, King's County, Ireland.

== Works ==
- Reminiscences of Court and Diplomatic Life (2 vols.), 1883: record of her career of her life as courtier and as the wife of a diplomat. https://archive.org/stream/reminiscencesofc00blooiala
- Memoir of Benjamin, Lord Bloomfield, (2 vols.), 1884: memoirs of her father-in-law. https://archive.org/details/memoirofbenjamin01bloo/
- Gleanings of a Long Life, 1902: collection of extracts from her favourite books
