= John Calvin Broomfield =

John Calvin Broomfield (1872–1950) was one of only two Bishops ever elected by the Methodist Protestant Church (M.P. Church). This U.S. branch of Methodism did not elect Bishops but had Conference Presidents instead. However, in 1939 in preparation for reunion with the Methodist Episcopal Church and the Methodist Episcopal Church, South, the M.P. delegates to the Uniting Conference in Kansas City were authorized to elect two Bishops as their contribution to the episcopacy of the new denomination, The Methodist Church. John Calvin Broomfield and James Henry Straughn were those elected.

== Early years ==
John was born 4 July 1872 in Eyemouth, Scotland. He began his working career as a sailor. He emigrated to the U.S., eventually settling in Beaver Falls, Pennsylvania.

== Ordained and Episcopal Ministry ==
He was Admitted On Trial to the Pittsburgh Conference of the M.P. Church in 1895 and ordained in 1896. He served as pastor of churches in Pennsylvania and West Virginia. He was also involved in the Religious Work campaign during World War I.

Rev. Broomfield was elected President of the Pittsburgh Conference in 1924 and continued in this office until his election to the episcopacy. After his election, he was assigned the St. Louis episcopal area. Upon his election as Bishop, he was introduced by Bishop John Moore:

"John Calvin Broomfield - a Methodist: born in Scotland and a naturalized American; a Methodist Protestant and a Bishop!"

He was a delegate to the Sixth Ecumenical Conference and was a member of the Oxford and Edinburg Conferences in 1937. He also made a church journey in the Orient.

Bishop Broomfield retired in 1944.

== See also ==
- List of bishops of the United Methodist Church
