= List of judges of the Federal Court of Australia =

Judges who have served on the Federal Court of Australia as of May 2019, are appointed in accordance with section 72 of the Constitution, which has, since the Court's inception in 1976, been for a term expiring at age 70.

In addition to their judicial service, six judges of the Federal Court have also been elected to the Parliament of Australia: Nigel Bowen, Bob Ellicott, Merv Everett, Tony Whitlam, John Reeves and Duncan Kerr. All were elected prior to their appointment to the bench.

Additionally, two judges of the Federal Court have served in state Parliaments: Bernard Riley, formerly of the New South Wales Legislative Council, and Howard Olney, formerly of the Western Australian Legislative Council.

== Judges including Chief Justices ==
Position	Name	Appointment commenced	Appointment ended	Term	Comments	Notes
Chief Justice	Sir Nigel Bowen	20 December 1976	31 December 1990	14 years, 11 days	Chief Judge in Equity of the Supreme Court (NSW)	
Chief Justice	Michael Black	1 January 1991	21 March 2010	19 years, 79 days	Barrister (Queen's Counsel for Victoria and Tasmania)	
Chief Justice	Patrick Keane	22 March 2010	28 February 2013	2 years, 343 days	Court of Appeal Judge in the Supreme Court (Qld); Appointed to the High Court	
Chief Justice	James Allsop	1 March 2013	6 April 2023	10 years, 36 days	Previously President of the Court of Appeal (NSW) previously served as Federal Court judge	
Chief Justice	Debra Mortimer	7 April 2023		3 years, 213 days	Judge of the Federal Court (2013–)	
Judge	Sir Richard Blackburn	1 February 1977	31 March 1985	8 years, 58 days		
Judge	(Sir) Gerard Brennan	1 February 1977	12 February 1981	4 years, 11 days	Appointed to the High Court	
Judge	Xavier Connor	1 February 1977	17 March 1982	5 years, 44 days		
Judge	Phillip Evatt	1 February 1977	28 February 1987	10 years, 27 days	Judge of the Supreme Court (NI)	
Judge	Sir William Forster	1 February 1977	31 January 1989	11 years, 365 days		
Judge	Robert Franki	1 February 1977	5 August 1986	9 years, 185 days		
Judge	Russell Fox	1 February 1977	31 March 1989	12 years, 58 days	Chief Judge of the Supreme Court (NI)	
Judge	John Keely	1 February 1977	29 February 1996	19 years, 28 days	Judge of Industrial Relations Court	
Judge	James Muirhead	1 February 1977	4 August 1986	9 years, 184 days		
Judge	Sir John Nimmo	1 February 1977	30 June 1980	3 years, 150 days		
Judge	Ray Northrop	1 February 1977	31 August 1998	21 years, 211 days	Judge of Industrial Relations Court	
Judge	Bernard Riley	1 February 1977	4 August 1978	1 year, 184 days		
Judge	Sir Reginald Smithers	1 February 1977	30 September 1986	9 years, 241 days		
Judge	Robert St John	1 February 1977	31 March 1985	8 years, 58 days	Judge of the Supreme Court (NI)	
Judge	Charles Sweeney	1 February 1977	29 June 1995	18 years, 148 days		
Judge	John Sweeney	1 February 1977	7 May 1981	4 years, 95 days		
Judge	Richard Ward	1 February 1977	24 November 1977	296 days		
Judge	Sir Edward Woodward	1 February 1977	31 July 1990	13 years, 180 days		
Judge	(Sir) William Deane	1 April 1977	26 July 1982	5 years, 116 days	Appointed to the High Court	
Judge	John Toohey	4 April 1977	31 December 1986	9 years, 271 days	Appointed to the High Court	
Judge	Douglas McGregor	7 November 1977	14 November 1985	8 years, 7 days		
Judge	Francis Fisher	6 March 1978	31 July 1989	11 years, 147 days		
Judge	John Gallop	11 March 1978	30 July 2000	22 years, 141 days		
Judge	Daryl Davies	17 May 1978	31 August 1998	20 years, 106 days		
Judge	John Lockhart	30 October 1978	11 June 1999	20 years, 224 days	(1935–2006)	
Judge	Ian Sheppard	9 December 1979	23 May 1997	17 years, 165 days		
Judge	John Kelly	11 March 1980	1 July 1990	10 years, 112 days		
Judge	Trevor Morling	11 February 1981	1 February 1993	11 years, 356 days	Judge of the Supreme Court (NI)	
Judge	Bob Ellicott	2 March 1981	24 February 1983	1 year, 359 days		
Judge	Gerald Fitzgerald	25 November 1981	30 June 1984	2 years, 218 days		
Judge	Kenneth Jenkinson	1 November 1982	5 June 1997	14 years, 216 days		
Judge	Alan Neaves	11 March 1983	8 January 1995	11 years, 303 days		
Judge	Michael Kirby	30 March 1983	23 September 1984	1 year, 177 days	Appointed to NSW Court of Appeal then to High Court	
Judge	Bryan Beaumont	30 May 1983	11 February 2005	21 years, 257 days	Chief Justice of the Supreme Court (NI)	
Judge	Murray Wilcox	11 May 1984	2 October 2006	22 years, 144 days	Chief Justice of Industrial Relations Court; Judge of the Supreme Court (NI); Additional Judge of the Supreme Court (ACT)	
Judge	Peter Gray	17 May 1984	17 May 2013	29 years, 0 days	Judge of Industrial Relations Court	
Judge	Jeffrey Spender	17 May 1984	19 July 2010	26 years, 63 days	Judge of Industrial Relations Court; Additional Judge of the Supreme Court (ACT)	
Judge	Merv Everett	27 June 1984	4 October 1987	3 years, 99 days		
Judge	Bill Pincus	25 March 1985	16 December 1991	6 years, 266 days		
Judge	James Burchett	3 June 1985	10 October 2000	15 years, 129 days		
Judge	Jeffrey Miles	18 June 1985	30 September 2002	17 years, 104 days		
Judge	David Jackson	15 November 1985	26 May 1987	1 year, 192 days	"Australia's pre-eminent constitutional law barrister", according to lawyer Louise Clegg in the AFR (2023)	
Judge	Donnell Ryan	29 September 1986	2 June 2011	24 years, 246 days	Judge of Industrial Relations Court; Additional Judge of the Supreme Court (ACT)	
Judge	William Gummow	24 November 1986	20 April 1995	8 years, 147 days	Appointed to the High Court	
Judge	Robert French	25 November 1986	1 September 2008	21 years, 281 days	Additional Judge of the Supreme Court (ACT); Appointed to Chief Justice of the High Court	
Judge	Marcus Einfeld	18 December 1986	16 April 2001	14 years, 119 days		
Judge	Trevor Hartigan	13 August 1987	24 April 1990	2 years, 254 days		
Judge	Michael Foster	2 November 1987	26 November 1998	11 years, 24 days		
Judge	Alastair Nicholson	1 February 1988	31 May 2004	16 years, 120 days		
Judge	Malcolm Lee	15 February 1988	1 May 2006	18 years, 75 days	Judge of Industrial Relations Court	
Judge	Howard Olney	21 May 1988	30 April 2003	14 years, 344 days		
Judge	John von Doussa	1 December 1988	15 August 2003	14 years, 257 days	Judge of Industrial Relations Court	
Judge	Graham Hill	1 February 1989	24 August 2005	16 years, 204 days		
Judge	Deirdre O'Connor	1 July 1990	5 March 2002	11 years, 247 days		
Judge	John Phillips	14 August 1990	17 December 1991	1 year, 125 days		
Judge	Maurice O'Loughlin	1 August 1989	28 January 2003	13 years, 180 days		
Judge	Terrence Higgins	1 July 1990	12 September 2013	23 years, 73 days		
Judge	Peter Heerey	17 December 1990	16 February 2009	18 years, 61 days		
Judge	Doug Drummond	2 December 1991	12 April 2003	11 years, 131 days		
Judge	Richard Cooper	30 March 1992	14 March 2005	12 years, 349 days		
Judge	Margaret Beazley	1 January 1993	28 April 1996	3 years, 118 days	Judge of Industrial Relations Court; Appointed to Court of Appeal (NSW)	
Judge	Tony Whitlam	1 January 1993	1 May 2005	12 years, 120 days		
Judge	Christopher Carr	13 December 1993	1 August 2004	10 years, 232 days		
Judge	Michael Moore	28 March 1994	1 August 2011	17 years, 126 days	Judge of Industrial Relations Court; Additional Judge of the Supreme Court (ACT)	
Judge	Catherine Branson	16 May 1994	13 October 2008	14 years, 150 days		
Judge	Jane Mathews	4 July 1994	6 April 2001	6 years, 276 days		
Judge	Kevin Lindgren	26 July 1994	12 February 2010	15 years, 201 days		
Judge	Brian Tamberlin	29 August 1994	30 March 2009	14 years, 213 days	Additional Judge of the Supreme Court (ACT)	
Judge	Ronald Sackville	19 September 1994	25 August 2008	13 years, 341 days		
Judge	Susan Kiefel	17 October 1994	3 September 2007	12 years, 321 days	Judge of the Supreme Court (NI); Appointed to the High Court	
Judge	Robert Nicholson	1 January 1995	7 August 2007	12 years, 218 days		
Judge	Paul Finn	3 July 1995	4 July 2012	17 years, 1 day		
Judge	Ross Sundberg	10 July 1995	9 August 2010	15 years, 30 days		
Judge	Shane Marshall	17 July 1995	21 November 2015	20 years, 127 days	Judge of Industrial Relations Court	
Judge	John Lehane	3 October 1995	10 September 2001	5 years, 342 days		
Judge	Rodney Madgwick	3 October 1995	21 April 2008	12 years, 201 days	Judge of Industrial Relations Court; Additional Judge of the Supreme Court (ACT)	
Judge	Anthony North	3 October 1995	11 September 2018	22 years, 343 days	Judge of Industrial Relations Court; Additional Judge of the Supreme Court (ACT)	
Judge	Ron Merkel	5 February 1996	15 May 2006	10 years, 99 days		
Judge	John Mansfield	2 September 1996	24 August 2016	19 years, 357 days		
Judge	Arthur Emmett	3 February 1997	6 March 2013	16 years, 31 days		
Judge	Alan Goldberg	3 February 1997	4 July 2010	13 years, 151 days		
Judge	Raymond Finkelstein	21 July 1997	1 July 2011	13 years, 345 days		
Judge	Geoffrey Giudice	17 September 1997	28 February 2012	14 years, 164 days	President of AIRC & then Fair Work Australia	
Judge	Mark Weinberg	15 July 1998	19 July 2008	10 years, 4 days	Judge of the Court of Appeal (Vic); Chief Justice of the Supreme Court (NI); Additional Judge of the Supreme Court (ACT)	
Judge	John Dowsett	14 September 1998	26 April 2018	19 years, 224 days	Additional Judge of the Supreme Court (ACT); Previously a Judge of the Supreme Court (Qld).	
Judge	Leslie Katz	30 September 1998	21 March 2002	3 years, 172 days		
Judge	Peter Hely	2 October 1998	1 October 2005	6 years, 364 days		
Judge	Susan Kenny	16 October 1998	29 November 2023	28 years, 21 days	Presidential member of the Administrative Appeals Tribunal; Previously a judge of the Court of Appeal (Vic)	
Judge	Roger Gyles	11 June 1999	22 August 2008	9 years, 72 days	Additional Judge of the Supreme Court (ACT)	
Judge	Richard Conti	15 August 2000	15 August 2007	7 years, 0 days		
Judge	Margaret Stone	9 October 2000	22 March 2012	11 years, 165 days	Additional Judge of the Supreme Court (ACT)	
Judge	James Allsop	7 May 2001	2 June 2008	7 years, 26 days	As Justice. Additional Judge of the Supreme Court (ACT); Appointed President of the Court of Appeal (NSW) returned to court as Chief Justice	
Judge	Garry Downes	2 April 2002	15 May 2012	10 years, 43 days	Judge of the Supreme Court (NI)	
Judge	Peter Jacobson	17 June 2002	25 January 2015	12 years, 222 days	Chief Justice of the Supreme Court (NI)	
Judge	Bradley Selway	18 November 2002	10 April 2005	2 years, 143 days		
Judge	Annabelle Bennett	5 May 2003	23 March 2016	12 years, 323 days	Additional Judge of the Supreme Court (ACT)	
Judge	Bruce Lander	14 July 2003	31 August 2013	10 years, 48 days	Judge of the Supreme Court (NI); Additional Judge of the Supreme Court (ACT)	
Judge	Susan Crennan	3 February 2004	1 November 2005	1 year, 271 days	Appointed to the High Court	
Judge	Antony Siopis	14 April 2005	5 May 2018	13 years, 21 days	Presidential member of the Administrative Appeals Tribunal	
Judge	Richard Edmonds	5 May 2005	10 February 2016	10 years, 281 days		
Judge	Peter Graham	24 May 2005	6 September 2010	5 years, 105 days		
Judge	Andrew Greenwood	4 August 2005	19 July 2022	16 years, 349 days		
Judge	Neil Young	30 November 2005	24 January 2007	1 year, 55 days		
Judge	Steven Rares	2 February 2006	15 November 2023	17 years, 286 days	Additional Judge of the Supreme Court (ACT)	
Judge	Berna Collier	8 February 2006		20 years, 271 days	Judge of the Papua New Guinea Supreme Court; Deputy President of the Administrative Appeals Tribunal; Additional Judge of the Supreme Court (ACT)	
Judge	Dennis Cowdroy	13 March 2006	15 March 2014	8 years, 2 days		
Judge	Anthony Besanko	3 April 2006	7 May 2024	18 years, 34 days	Chief Justice of the Supreme Court (NI); Additional Judge of the Supreme Court (ACT); Previously a judge of the Supreme Court of South Australia	
Judge	Christopher Jessup	23 June 2006	15 April 2017	20 years, 136 days		
Judge	Richard Tracey	24 July 2006	16 August 2018	12 years, 23 days		
Judge	John Middleton	31 July 2006	25 December 2022	16 years, 147 days		
Judge	Robert Buchanan	8 September 2006	10 September 2016	10 years, 2 days	Judge of the Supreme Court (NI)	
Judge	John Gilmour	11 December 2006	23 March 2018	11 years, 102 days	Judge of the Supreme Court (NI)	
Judge	Michelle Gordon	20 April 2007	8 June 2015	8 years, 49 days	Appointed to the High Court	
Judge	John Logan	27 September 2007	5 March 2026	19 years, 40 days		
Judge	Geoffrey Flick	15 October 2007	18 October 2021	14 years, 3 days		
Judge	Neil McKerracher	15 October 2007	5 December 2021	14 years, 51 days		
Judge	John Reeves	19 November 2007	1 January 2022	14 years, 43 days		
Judge	Nye Perram	8 August 2008		18 years, 90 days		
Judge	Jayne Jagot	3 September 2008	16 October 2022	14 years, 43 days	Appointed to the High Court	
Judge	Lindsay Foster	4 September 2008	30 September 2020	12 years, 26 days		
Judge	Michael Barker	9 February 2009	11 February 2019	10 years, 2 days		
Judge	John Nicholas	16 February 2009	1 May 2025	16 years, 355 days		
Judge	David Yates	30 November 2009	30 November 2024	15 years, 0 days		
Judge	Mordecai Bromberg	7 December 2009		16 years, 334 days	President of the Australian Law Reform Commission (2023-present)	
Judge	Julie Dodds-Streeton	1 February 2010	1 April 2014	4 years, 59 days		
Judge	Anna Katzmann	1 February 2010	24 June 2025	16 years, 278 days	1 year, 135 days	
Judge	Alan Robertson	11 April 2011	8 May 2020	9 years, 27 days		
Judge	Bernard Murphy	13 June 2011	3 August 2026	15 years, 146 days	95 days	
Judge	Iain Ross	1 March 2012	18 November 2022	10 years, 262 days	President of Fair Work Commission (2012-2022)	
Judge	John Griffiths	23 April 2012	1 April 2022	9 years, 343 days		
Judge	Duncan Kerr	10 May 2012	25 February 2022	9 years, 291 days	President of the Administrative Appeals Tribunal (2012-2017); Previously member of the House of Representatives and Attorney-General	
Judge	Kathleen Farrell	5 December 2012	1 August 2023	10 years, 239 days		
Judge	Tony Pagone	21 June 2013	31 March 2018	4 years, 283 days		
Judge	Jennifer Davies	4 July 2013	1 April 2022	8 years, 271 days		
Judge	Debra Mortimer	12 July 2013		13 years, 117 days	Appointed Chief Justice (2023–)	
Judge	Darryl Rangiah	13 August 2013		13 years, 85 days		
Judge	Richard Conway White	31 August 2013	5 January 2022	8 years, 127 days		
Judge	Michael Wigney	9 September 2013		13 years, 58 days	Judge of the Supreme Court (NI)	
Judge	Melissa Perry	23 September 2013		13 years, 44 days		
Judge	Jacqueline Gleeson	15 April 2014	28 February 2021	6 years, 319 days	Appointed to the High Court	
Judge	Jonathan Beach	30 June 2014		12 years, 129 days		
Judge	James Edelman	20 April 2015	29 January 2017	1 year, 284 days	Appointed to the High Court	
Judge	Brigitte Markovic	24 August 2015		11 years, 74 days		
Judge	Mark Moshinsky	3 November 2015		11 years, 3 days	Acting President of the Australian Law Reform Commission (2023–)	
Judge	Robert Bromwich	29 February 2016		10 years, 251 days		
Judge	Natalie Charlesworth	1 March 2016		10 years, 250 days		
Judge	Stephen Burley	6 May 2016		10 years, 184 days		
Judge	David O'Callaghan	1 February 2017		9 years, 278 days		
Judge	Michael Lee	27 March 2017		9 years, 224 days		
Judge	Roger Derrington	29 March 2017		9 years, 222 days		
Judge	David Thomas	27 June 2017	31 January 2024	6 years, 218 days	President of the Administrative Appeals Tribunal (2017-2022); Previously a Judge of the Supreme Court (Qld)	
Judge	Sarah Derrington	10 January 2018		8 years, 300 days	President of the Australian Law Reform Commission (2018-2023)	
Judge	Simon Steward	1 February 2018	30 November 2020	2 years, 303 days	Appointed to the High Court	
Judge	Katrina Banks-Smith	12 February 2018		8 years, 267 days	Previously a Judge of Supreme Court (WA)	
Judge	Craig Colvin	13 February 2018		8 years, 266 days		
Judge	Thomas Thawley	14 February 2018		8 years, 265 days		
Judge	Michael Wheelahan	3 October 2018		8 years, 34 days		
Judge	Paul Anastassiou	1 February 2019	29 April 2022	3 years, 87 days		
Judge	Angus Stewart	25 February 2019		7 years, 254 days		
Judge	Michael O'Bryan	26 February 2019		7 years, 253 days		
Judge	Darren Jackson	20 March 2019		7 years, 231 days		
Judge	John Snaden	29 April 2019		7 years, 191 days		
Judge	Stewart Anderson	6 May 2019		7 years, 184 days		
Judge	Wendy Abraham	7 May 2019		7 years, 183 days		
Judge	John Halley	19 March 2021		5 years, 232 days		
Judge	Elizabeth Cheeseman	12 April 2021		5 years, 208 days		
Judge	Helen Rofe	12 July 2021		5 years, 117 days		
Judge	Kylie Downes	2 August 2021		5 years, 96 days		
Judge	Scott Goodman	11 November 2021		4 years, 360 days		
Judge	Patrick O'Sullivan	20 January 2022		4 years, 290 days	Previously a Judge of the District Court of South Australia	
Judge	Shaun McElwaine	24 January 2022		4 years, 286 days		
Judge	Michael Feutrill	8 March 2022		4 years, 243 days		
Judge	Fiona Meagher	31 March 2022		4 years, 220 days	President of the Administrative Appeals Tribunal (2022)	
Judge	Timothy McEvoy	26 April 2022		4 years, 194 days	Previously a Judge of the Federal Circuit and Family Court (Division 1)	
Judge	Lisa Hespe	27 April 2022		4 years, 193 days		
Judge	Elizabeth Raper	2 May 2022		4 years, 188 days		
Judge	Geoffrey Kennett	19 December 2022		3 years, 322 days	Previously a Judge of the Supreme Court of the Australian Capital Territory	
Judge	Catherine Button	16 January 2023		3 years, 294 days	Previously a Judge of the Supreme Court of Victoria	
Judge	Ian Jackman	6 February 2023		3 years, 273 days		
Judge	Adam Hatcher	19 February 2023		3 years, 260 days	President of the Fair Work Commission (2023–)	
Judge	Emilios Kyrou	8 June 2023		3 years, 151 days	Previously a Judge of the Supreme Court of Victoria; President of the Administrative Appeals Tribunal (2023–)	
Judge	Christopher Horan	5 September 2023		3 years, 62 days		
Judge	Yaseen Shariff	7 September 2023		3 years, 60 days		
Judge	Penelope Neskovcin	8 February 2024		2 years, 271 days		
Judge	Craig Dowling	9 February 2024		2 years, 270 days		
Judge	Jane Needham	5 July 2024		2 years, 124 days		
Judge	Stephen McDonald	8 July 2024		2 years, 121 days		
Judge	Samuel Vandongen	17 December 2024		1 year, 324 days	Previously a Judge of Supreme Court (WA)	
Judge	Cameron Moore	18 December 2024		1 year, 323 days		
Judge	Nicholas Owens	18 December 2024		1 year, 323 days		
Judge	James Stellios	19 December 2024		1 year, 322 days		
Judge	Houda Younan	19 December 2024		1 year, 322 days		
Judge	Elizabeth Bennett	20 December 2024		1 year, 321 days		
Judge	Erin Longbottom	20 December 2024		1 year, 321 days		
Judge	Amelia Wheatley	6 January 2025		1 year, 304 days		
	Graeme Hill	2 April 2025		1 year, 218 days		
	Craig Lenahan	9 February 2026		270 days		

== Location of current judges ==
Sydney

- Nye Perram (8 August 2008)
- Michael Wigney (9 September 2013)
- Melissa Perry (23 September 2013)
- Brigitte Markovic (24 August 2015)
- Robert Bromwich (29 February 2016)
- Stephen Burley (23 May 2016)
- Michael Lee (23 April 2017)
- Thomas Thawley (14 February 2018)
- Angus Stewart (25 February 2019)
- Wendy Abraham (7 May 2019)
- John Halley (19 March 2021)
- Elizabeth Cheeseman (12 April 2021)
- Scott Goodman (11 November 2021)
- Elizabeth Raper (2 May 2022)
- Geoffrey Kennett (19 December 2022)
- Ian Jackman (6 February 2023)
- Adam Hatcher (19 February 2023)
- Yaseen Shariff (7 September 2023)
- Jane Needham (5 July 2024)
- Cameron Moore (18 December 2024)
- Nicholas Owens (18 December 2024)
- James Stellios (19 December 2024)
- Houda Younan (19 December 2024)
- Craig Lenahan (9 February 2026)

Melbourne

- Mordecai Bromberg (7 December 2009)
- Debra Mortimer (12 July 2013) (Chief Justice)
- Jonathan Beach (30 June 2014)
- Mark Moshinsky (3 November 2015)
- David O'Callaghan (1 February 2017)
- Michael Wheelahan (3 October 2018)
- Michael O’Bryan (26 February 2019)
- John Snaden (29 April 2019)
- Stewart Anderson (6 May 2019)
- Helen Rofe (12 July 2021)
- Timothy McEvoy (26 April 2022)
- Lisa Hespe (27 April 2022)
- Catherine Button (16 January 2023)
- Emilios Kyrou (8 June 2023)
- Christopher Horan (5 September 2023)
- Penelope Neskovcin (8 February 2024)
- Craig Dowling (9 February 2024)
- Elizabeth Bennett (20 December 2024)
- Graeme Hill (2 April 2025)

Brisbane

- Berna Collier (8 February 2006)
- Darryl Rangiah (13 August 2013)
- Roger Derrington (24 April 2017)
- Sarah Derrington (10 January 2018)
- Kylie Downes (2 August 2021)
- Fiona Meagher (31 March 2022)
- Erin Longbottom (20 December 2024)
- Amelia Wheatley (6 January 2025)

Perth

- Katrina Banks-Smith (12 February 2018)
- Craig Colvin (13 February 2018)
- Darren Jackson (20 March 2019)
- Michael Feutrill (8 March 2022)
- Samuel Vandongen (17 December 2024)

Adelaide

- Natalie Charlesworth (1 March 2016)
- Patrick O'Sullivan (20 January 2022)
- Stephen Andrew McDonald (8 July 2024)

Hobart

- Shaun McElwaine (24 January 2022)

== See also ==
- Judiciary of Australia

Federal Court Judges holding concurrent appointments in:

- List of judges of the Federal Court of Bankruptcy
- List of judges of the Industrial Relations Court of Australia
- List of judges of the Supreme Court of the Australian Capital Territory
- List of judges of the Supreme Court of Christmas Island
- List of judges of the Supreme Court of the Cocos (Keeling) Islands
- List of judges of the Supreme Court of Norfolk Island
