= List of judges of the Industrial Relations Court of Australia =

Judges who served on the Industrial Relations Court of Australia are:

Position	Name	From	To	Term	Comments	Notes
Chief Justice	Murray Wilcox	30 March 1994	2 October 2006	12 years, 186 days		
Judge	Ray Northrop	30 March 1994	9 August 1995	1 year, 132 days		
Judge	John Keely	30 March 1994	29 February 1996	1 year, 336 days		
Judge	Jeffrey Spender	30 March 1994	19 July 2010	16 years, 111 days		
Judge	Peter Gray AM	30 March 1994	17 May 2013	19 years, 48 days		
Judge	Donnell Ryan	30 March 1994	2 June 2011	17 years, 64 days	Additional Judge of the Supreme Court (ACT)	
Judge	Malcolm Lee	30 March 1994	1 May 2006	12 years, 32 days		
Judge	John von Doussa	30 March 1994	15 August 2003	9 years, 138 days		
Judge	Michael Moore	30 March 1994	1 August 2011	17 years, 124 days	Additional Judge of the Supreme Court (ACT)	
Judge	Margaret Beazley	30 March 1994	28 April 1996	2 years, 30 days	Appointed to Court of Appeal (NSW)	
Judge	Shane Marshall	17 July 1995	21 November 2015	20 years, 127 days		
Judge	Anthony North	3 October 1995	11 September 2018	22 years, 343 days	Additional Judge of the Supreme Court (ACT)	
Judge	Rodney Madgwick	3 October 1995	21 April 2008	12 years, 201 days	Additional Judge of the Supreme Court (ACT)	
