= Australian Competition and Consumer Commission v Baxter Healthcare Pty Ltd =

2007 High Court of Australia decision

- Court: High Court of Australia
- Full case name: Australian Competition and Consumer Commission v Baxter Healthcare Pty Limited & Ors
- Decided: 29 August 2007
- Citations: [2007] HCA 38, (2007) 232 CLR 1
- Transcript: [2007] HCATrans 202 (15 May 2007)

Case history
- Prior actions: ACCC v Baxter Healthcare [2005] FCA 581; ACCC v Baxter Healthcare [2006] FCAFC 128
- Subsequent action: ACCC v Baxter Healthcare [2008] FCAFC 141

Court membership
- Judges sitting: Gleeson CJ, Gummow, Kirby, Hayne, Callinan, Heydon and Crennan JJ

Case opinions
- (5:1:1) The immunity of governments from the restrictive trade practices provisions of the Trade Practices Act 1974 does not extend to trading corporations that provide goods or services to the government (per Gleeson CJ, Gummow, Hayne, Heydon and Crennan JJ; Callinan J dissenting and Kirby J deciding on different grounds) (5:1:1) Derivative governmental immunity covers persons other than the government where applying the statute to those persons would have the effect of divesting the government of proprietary, contractual, or other legal rights or interests (per Gleeson CJ, Gummow, Hayne, Heydon and Crennan JJ; Callinan J dissenting and Kirby J deciding on different grounds)

Australian Competition and Consumer Commission v Baxter Healthcare Pty Ltd, (Baxter) was a decision of the High Court of Australia, which ruled on 29 August 2007 that Baxter Healthcare Proprietary Limited, a tenderer for various government contracts, was bound by the Trade Practices Act 1974 (TPA, Australian legislation governing anti-competitive behaviour) in its trade and commerce in tendering for government contracts. More generally, the case concerned the principles of derivative governmental immunity: whether the immunity of a government from a statute extends to third parties that conduct business with the government.

The High Court's judgment marked a successful appeal for the Australian Competition & Consumer Commission, the Australian regulator of anti-competitive conduct, having lost at first instance and on appeal in the Federal Court of Australia. The ACCC was again successful when the case was remitted to the Federal Court for reconsideration, ending eight years of litigation between the parties. The High Court's judgment was received as a significant precedent in the law of derivative governmental immunity in Australia.

== Background ==
=== Facts ===
Baxter Healthcare Pty Ltd (Baxter), is the Australian subsidiary of Baxter International which is a publicly listed multinational manufacturer and distributor of medical products. Baxter International is headquartered in Deerfield, Illinois.

Baxter Healthcare manufactures large volume intravenous (IV) fluids, peritoneal dialysis (PD) fluids and large volume sterile irrigation fluids for Australia, New Zealand and the Pacific Islands at a GMP certified manufacturing facility in Western Sydney. From the early 1990s to the late 2000s, Baxter held a monopoly in the IV fluid market due to the exit of previous competitors and the cost to potential suppliers to import the amount of IV fluid needed. However, in the PD market Baxter did have competitors with its main rivals being Fresenius Medical Care and Gambro who held a large share of the haemodialysis market.

The state and NT governments each held individual supply contracts that were for large volume sterile fluids. These encompassed IV and PD fluids, most also included parenteral nutrition fluids (PN). (Baxter and Fresenius also sold parenteral nutrition, Baxter manufactured some, but not all, in Australia.)

In 1992, a consortium of three companies including Gambro raised concerns about the manner in which the NSW sterile fluids contract was structured for and awarded. Following contracts later tendered and awarded (SA in 1995, Qld in 1997 & NSW encompassing ACT in 1997), the concerns drew the attention of the ACCC. Baxter adopted a strategy of leveraging the monopoly of the IV fluids market to attain favourable terms of sole supply for PD and PN solutions, excluding competition.

Baxter put in multiple bids for the contracts, one was a cherry pick (line-by-line) offer where there were no commitments to purchase any particular amount of products. The other offers were bundled proposals. The tender responses presented prohibitively high prices for IV fluids if sole supply was not committed to for the products Baxter tendered for PD & PN fluids. IV fluids are an essential life-saving product line upon which the health sector relies and are purchased in exceptionally high volumes; the effect of the tenders was to eliminate competition. The ACCC investigated and prosecuted the contracts as abuse of market power under the Trade Practices Act.

=== Legislation ===
Section 46 of the TPA prohibited corporations from misusing market power. Section 47 prohibited exclusive dealing. The critical provision to the case was Section 2B of the TPA. Section 2B provided that Sections 46 and 47 of the TPA:

... bind the Crown in right of each of the States, of the Northern Territory and of the Australian Capital Territory, so far as the Crown carries on a business, either directly or by an authority of the State or Territory ...

Section 2B thus provided an immunity from state and territory governments from Sections 46 and 47 of the TPA insofar as the governments were not carrying on a business.

=== The Australian Competition & Consumer Commission ===
The Australian Competition & Consumer Commission (ACCC), the Australian government authority responsible for regulating the TPA, commenced an action in the Federal Court of Australia seeking declarations that Baxter's bundling pricing structure in its tenders had contravened Sections 46 and 47 of the TPA. The ACCC sought the imposition of injunctions and pecuniary penalties by the court.

=== Derivative governmental immunity before Baxter ===
Derivative governmental immunity refers to the extension of a government's immunity from a statute to a non-government party on the basis the government would be affected if the statute was to apply to the other party.

Prior to Baxter, the leading case on derivative governmental immunity in Australia was the 1979 High Court judgment in Bradken Consolidated Ltd v Broken Hill Pty Co Ltd. In Bradken, the High Court upheld a claim for derivative governmental immunity by equipment suppliers to the Queensland Commissioner for Railways. The majority's conclusion was that if the Queensland government was immune from the TPA, it would prejudice the Queensland government if the contracts and arrangements it entered were subject to the TPA through the other parties to the contracts and arrangements.

Bradken's application of the principle of derivative governmental immunity had been subject to criticism. Robertson Wright SC, a Senior Counsel specialising in competition and trade practices law, argued there are "a number of difficulties" with the judgment, including the "unsatisfactory nature" of the authorities it relied on. The High Court's judgment in Baxter would mark a retreat from Bradken.

== Federal Court litigation ==
The ACCC conceded that the state governments were not carrying on businesses in procuring the medical products. This meant that the governments were immune from Sections 46 and 47 of the TPA. Baxter argued that this immunity extended to itself, by claiming derivative governmental immunity. On 16 May 2005, The Federal Court of Australia (Allsop J presiding) found in Baxter's favour at first instance. While the court held that Baxter would have breached the TPA, governmental immunity under Section 2B extended to Baxter Healthcare. Allsop J's judgment was upheld unanimously on appeal to the full bench of the Federal Court (Justices Mansfield, Dowsett and Gyles presiding). The full bench expressed unease about its own judgment, stating that the question of derivative governmental immunity should be left to the High Court for reconsideration of Bradken.

== High Court appeal ==
The ACCC was granted special leave to appeal to the High Court against the judgment of the full bench of the Federal Court. The appeal was heard on 16 May 2007. The Australian Government Solicitor acted for the ACCC, with Lindsay Foster as Senior Counsel; Blake Dawson and David Yates SC represented Baxter. In addition to Baxter, the states of Western Australia, South Australia and New South Wales were respondents to the appeal. The High Court decided on 29 August 2007, by a 6–1 majority, to allow the ACCC's appeal and remit the matter back to the full bench of Federal Court for reconsideration. The majority held that Baxter was not covered by derivative governmental immunity in its dealings with the state governments.

=== Judgments ===
==== Joint judgment ====
Five judges (Chief Justice Gleeson and Justices Gummow, Hayne, Heydon and Crennan) joined in the leading majority judgment allowing the ACCC's appeal. The joint judgment reasoned that Parliament could not have intended for corporations that do business with the government to be exempt from the restrictive trade practices provisions in Part IV of the TPA in respect of that business. Emphasising the overall purpose of the TPA, the judges reasoned that the purpose would not be fulfilled if Baxter could claim derivative immunity. In response to the concern that one party to a transaction (the government) would be immune from the TPA while the other party would be bound by it, the joint judgment reasoned there was "nothing unusual" about such an outcome.

The joint judgment did not rule out derivative governmental immunity in all cases. In determining the scope of whether governmental immunity from a statutory provision extends to a party dealing with the government, the judgment adopted the following position of Justice Kitto, then dissenting, in the 1955 High Court case of Wynyard Investments v Commissioner for Railways (NSW):

The object in view is to ascertain whether the Crown has such an interest in that which would be interfered with if the provision in question were held to bind the corporation that the interference would be, for a legal reason, an interference with some right, interest, power, authority, privilege, immunity or purpose belonging or appertaining to the Crown.

Wynyard Investments was a case about governmental immunity generally (not derivative governmental immunity specifically), but Justice Kitto's dissenting judgment extended to derivative governmental immunity.

Having examined the characteristics of the TPA as a law to promote competitive behaviour, the joint judgment held that the extension of derivative governmental immunity from the TPA to a trading corporation would be a "remarkable" conclusion and "far beyond what is necessary to protect the legal rights of governments, or to prevent a divesting of proprietary, contractual or other legal rights and interests."

==== Kirby J ====
Justice Kirby's judgment agreed with the outcome of the joint judgment, for different reasons. Kirby criticised the concept of governmental immunity itself, stating that "persisting with [governmental immunity] into the twenty-first century is unacceptable."

==== Callinan J ====
Justice Callinan dissented from the majority, holding that derivative governmental immunity extended to Baxter. Callinan followed Bradken, concluding that it remained authoritative.

== Reaction to judgment ==
=== Significance ===
Robertson Wright, writing after the judgment was handed down, claimed that Baxter represented a change to the law, drawing the following conclusions from the judgment:

- The application of derivative governmental immunity depends on a construction of the particular statute (particularly the object and purpose of the statute).
- As a general rule, derivative governmental immunity applies if the statute's coverage of a person would divest the government of proprietary, contractual, or other legal rights or interests (as opposed to commercial or policy rights or interests).

The judgment was reported in the press as a significant legal victory for the ACCC. The judgment was also received as an "historic decision" setting a precedent for government procurement, on the basis that businesses might no longer be able to rely on immunity from the TPA when contracting with governments.

=== Criticism ===
Nicholas Seddon, a lawyer and academic specialising in commercial and government law, claimed the High Court's judgment leaves "many uncertainties", particularly regarding whether derivative governmental immunity will extend to private sector providers carrying out governmental functions that have been contracted to them (as opposed to merely providing goods or services to the government). Robertson Wright echoed these concerns, arguing the joint judgment did not "set out in as helpful detail" as it might the factors to be taken into account in deciding whether governmental immunity will derive to a party dealing with the government. Seddon also criticised the outcome of the case itself, arguing it is "difficult to see how derivative immunity does not inevitably flow" from the governmental immunity from the TPA. He suggested that the application of the TPA to a party that deals with a government compromises the intention of Parliament that State and Territory governments should be immune from the TPA.

== Later action ==
The ACCC was successful, by a 2–1 majority, upon the remittal of the case to the full bench of the Federal Court. The full bench found that Baxter contravened Sections 46 and 47 of the TPA. That judgment ended the eight-year-long litigation between Baxter and the ACCC. It was the first time in over 10 years that a corporation had unsuccessfully defended a prosecution brought by the ACCC for an alleged contravention of Section 46. The full bench declared that Baxter breached Sections 46 and 47 of the TPA, but left it to the ACCC to seek pecuniary penalties. Baxter was refused special leave to appeal to the High Court against the full bench's judgment.
