= List of Sydney Law School alumni =

In its over 160-year history, the Sydney Law School has produced a prominent group of alumni. The following is a list of some of these prominent alumni.

== Courts and tribunals ==
=== International Court of Justice ===
- Sir Percy Spender: International Court of Justice judge 1958–1964, President 1964–1967
- Sir Garfield Barwick ad hoc judge 1973–1974

=== High Court of Australia ===
- Chief Justices of the High Court of Australia (in chronological order):
  1. Sir Garfield Barwick
  2. Sir Anthony Mason
  3. Murray Gleeson
- Puisne Justices of the High Court (in chronological order):
  1. Sir George Rich
  2. H. V. Evatt
  3. Sir Edward McTiernan
  4. Sir Dudley Williams
  5. Sir Frank Kitto
  6. Sir Alan Taylor
  7. Sir Victor Windeyer
  8. Sir Cyril Walsh
  9. Sir Kenneth Jacobs
  10. Lionel Murphy
  11. Sir William Deane
  12. Mary Gaudron
  13. Michael Kirby
  14. William Gummow
  15. Dyson Heydon
  16. Susan Crennan
  17. Virginia Bell
  18. Jacqueline Gleeson
  19. Jayne Jagot

As of 2017, Sydney Law School has produced 18 out of 52 Justices of the High Court of Australia (with the University of Sydney more broadly having produced 24).

=== Supreme Court of New South Wales ===
Chief Justices of the NSW Supreme Court:

- Tom Bathurst (2011–)
- James Spigelman (1998–2011)
- Murray Gleeson (1988–1998)
- Sir Laurence Whistler Street (1974–1988)
- Sir John Kerr (1972–1974)
- Sir Leslie James Herron (1962–1972)
- Dr. H. V. Evatt (1960–1962)
- Sir Kenneth Whistler Street (1950–1960)
- Sir Frederick Richard Jordan (1934–1949)
- Sir Philip Whistler Street (1925–1934)
- Sir William Portus Cullen (1910–1925)

Presidents of the NSW Court of Appeal

- Andrew Bell (2019-)
- Margaret Beazley (2013–2019)
- James Allsop (2008–2013)
- Keith Mason (1997-2008)
- Dennis Mahoney (1996-1997)
- Michael Kirby (1984-1996)
- Athol Moffitt (1974-1984)
- Sir Kenneth Jacobs (1972–1974)
- Sir Bernard Sugerman (1970-1972)
- Sir Gordon Wallace, first President of the Court of Appeal (1966–1970)

Judges of the NSW Court of Appeal:

- Paul Brereton (2018-)
- Richard White (2017-)
- Anthony Payne (2016-)
- Carolyn Simpson (2015–2018); Acting Judge of Appeal (2018-)
- Mark Leeming (2013–)
- Fabian Gleeson (2013-)
- Arthur Emmett (2013–2015); Acting Judge of Appeal (2015-)
- Peter McClellan (2013–2018)
- Julie Ward (2012–); Chief Judge in Equity (2017-)
- Clifton Hoeben (2012–); Chief Judge at Common Law (2013-)
- Reginald Barrett (2012-2015); Acting Judge of Appeal (2016-2020)
- Peter Young AO (2009–2012)
- Robert Macfarlan (2008–)
- Joseph Campbell (2007-2012)
- Ruth McColl AO (2003–2019)
- Kim Santow (2002–2007)

In 1999 legal history was made when Justices Virginia Bell, Margaret Beazley and Carolyn Simpson sat together, forming the first all-female bench in an Australian court. According to the Women Lawyers Association of NSW, there had never been an all-female bench in England or New Zealand.

Judges of the NSW Supreme Court:

- Julia Lonergan (2017-)
- Natalie Adams (2016-)
- Helen Wilson (2014-)
- John Sackar (2011-)
- Peter Garling (2010–)
- Clifton Hoeben (2004–2012)
- Carolyn Simpson (1994–2015)
- Kim Santow (1993–2002)
- Roddy Meagher (1989–2004)
- Peter Young AO (1985–2001)

=== Federal Court of Australia ===
- Nigel Bowen, First Chief Justice of the Federal Court of Australia (1976-1990)
- Marcus Einfeld (1986–2001)
- Arthur Emmett (1997–2013)
- Peter Jacobson (2002-2015)
- Steven Rares (2006-)
- Geoffrey Flick (2007-)
- Lindsay Foster (2008-2020)
- Jayne Jagot (2008-)
- Nye Perram (2008-)
- David Yates (2009-)
- Kathleen Farrell (2012-)
- James Allsop, Chief Justice of the Federal Court of Australia (2013–)
- Michael Wigney (2013-)
- Jacqueline Gleeson (2014-)
- Stephen Burley (2016-)
- Michael Lee (2017-)

=== Supreme Court of Tasmania ===
- Alan Blow AO (Justice 2000–2013; Chief Justice 2013–)

=== Supreme Court of Western Australia ===
- Graeme Murphy (3 August 2010)

== Solicitors-General of Australia ==
- Sir Robert Garran (1916–1932)
- Sir Anthony Mason (1964–1969)
- Bob Ellicott (1969–1973)
- Sir Maurice Byers (1973–1983)
- David Bennett (1998–2008)
- Justin Gleeson (2013–2016)

== Other legal professionals ==
- Marie Beuzeville Byles, the first woman to practise as a lawyer in NSW
- Nicholas Cowdery QC, former NSW Director of Public Prosecutions (1994–2011)
- Ada Emily Evans, the first woman in Australia to graduate with an LL.B. (but not permitted to practise)
- Elizabeth Evatt, former Chief Justice of the Family Court of Australia and first Australian to be appointed to the United Nations Human Rights Committee
- Barbara Holborow, magistrate in the New South Wales Children's Court
- Kate O'Regan, Justice of the Constitutional Court of South Africa from 1994 to 2009
- Geoffrey Robertson QC, former President of the Special Court for Sierra Leone, human rights lawyer, author and joint head of Doughty Street Chambers
- Kim Santow, Justice of Appeal in the New South Wales Supreme Court and former Chancellor of the University of Sydney (2001–2007)
- Mark Tedeschi QC, Senior Crown Prosecutor for New South Wales
- Lucy Turnbull, lawyer and former Lord Mayor of Sydney
- Bret Walker SC, leading silk and former President of the Law Council of Australia

== Politics ==
- President of the United Nations General Assembly:
  - Dr. H. V. Evatt (1948–1949)
- Governors-General of Australia (in chronological order):
  - Sir John Kerr
  - Sir William Deane
- Prime Ministers of Australia (in chronological order):
  - Sir Edmund Barton
  - Sir William McMahon
  - Gough Whitlam
  - John Howard
  - Tony Abbott
  - Malcolm Turnbull
- Deputy Prime Minister of Australia
  - Lionel Bowen
- Federal Opposition Leaders (in chronological order):
  - Dr. H. V. Evatt
  - John Howard
  - Malcolm Turnbull
  - Tony Abbott
- Attorneys-General of Australia (in chronological order)
  - Dr. H. V. Evatt
  - Sir Garfield Barwick
  - Sir Nigel Bowen
  - Tom Hughes AO QC Legion of Honour
  - Lionel Murphy
  - Kep Enderby
  - Bob Ellicott
  - Lionel Bowen
  - Philip Ruddock
  - Robert McClelland
- Governor of New South Wales
  - Margaret Beazley (2019-)
- Premier of New South Wales (in chronological order):
  - Sir Thomas Bavin
  - Neville Wran
- Premier of Queensland:
  - Sir Samuel Griffith
- Ambassadors:
  - John McCarthy, Ambassador of Australia to the Holy See
  - Joe Hockey, Ambassador of Australia to the United States

== Business ==
- James Wolfensohn, former President of the World Bank Group
- Rene Rivkin, entrepreneur
- Allan Moss, banker
- John Coates, Vice-President, International Olympic Committee
- David Gallop, Chief Executive, Football Federation Australia

== Academia ==
=== Academics ===
- William Gummow
- Dyson Heydon
- Sarah Joseph
- Andrew Leigh
- Ben Saul
- Tim Stephens

=== Rhodes scholars ===
24 Rhodes scholars including:

- Vincent John Flynn (1927)
- David Hargraves Hodgson (1962)
- Geoffrey Robertson (1970)
- Malcolm Turnbull (1978)
- Tony Abbott (1981)

=== Vinerian Scholars ===
- Peter Cane (1976), Magdalen College, Oxford
- Andrew Bell SC (1993), Magdalen College, Oxford
- Naomi Oreb (2012), Magdalen College, Oxford
- Luca Moretti (2019), Christ Church, Oxford
- Alyssa Glass (2020), Magdalen College, Oxford

== Arts, media, and entertainment ==
- Richard Ackland, journalist and publisher
- Janet Albrechtsen, columnist
- Alex Cubis, actor
- Julia Leigh, writer and film director
- Chas Licciardello, comedian
- David Marr, writer
- Julian Morrow, comedian
- Andrew O'Keefe, entertainer
- Craig Reucassel, comedian
- Peter Weir, film director

== Sport ==
- Nick Farr-Jones, former Wallabies captain
