= Industrial Relations Court of Australia =

Former Australian superior court 1994–1997

- Established: 1994
- Dissolved: 2021
- Jurisdiction: Australia
- Authorised by: Constitution of Australia Industrial Relations Act 1988
- Appeals to: High Court of Australia
- Website: fedcourt.gov.au/about/courts-and-tribunals/irca

The Industrial Relations Court of Australia was a short-lived Chapter III Court whose jurisdiction was transferred from the Federal Court in 1994, and transferred back in 1997. In the words of former Chief Justice Robert French, "The tide went in, the tide went out". Every judge had a concurrent appointment in the Federal Court. Despite the transfer of jurisdiction, any existing matter or appeal from an existing matter remained in the Industrial Relations Court of Australia, with the result that the last case was not finally disposed of until 2005/6. The Court was not to be abolished until after the last judge had retired. The last judge to retire was Anthony North on 11 September 2018. The court was formally abolished on 1 March 2021.

The court was the latest in a line of specialist federal courts dealing with industrial relations matters, being the Commonwealth Court of Conciliation and Arbitration (1904–1956), whose court and arbitration functions were divided as a result of the Boilermakers' case, succeeded by Commonwealth Industrial Court (1956–1973), which was renamed as the Australian Industrial Court (1973–1977). The last remaining judge of the Australian Industrial Court, Ray Northrop was appointed to the new court.

The creation of a specialist court was controversial, with academics Breen Creighton and Andrew Stewart stating that it was not clear that the creation of the court would serve any useful purpose. One of those opposed to the creation of the court was Federal Court judge Murray Wilcox who was subsequently offered appointment as Chief Justice. Wilcox reminded the Attorney-General, Michael Lavarch, of his opposition, to which Lavarch responded that Wilcox's knowledge of the pitfalls would help the court to avoid them.

== List of judges ==
Position	Name	From	To	Term	Comments	Notes
Chief Justice	Murray Wilcox	30 March 1994	2 October 2006	12 years, 186 days		
Judge	Ray Northrop	30 March 1994	9 August 1995	1 year, 132 days		
Judge	John Keely	30 March 1994	29 February 1996	1 year, 336 days		
Judge	Jeffrey Spender	30 March 1994	19 July 2010	16 years, 111 days		
Judge	Peter Gray AM	30 March 1994	17 May 2013	19 years, 48 days		
Judge	Donnell Ryan	30 March 1994	2 June 2011	17 years, 64 days	Additional Judge of the Supreme Court (ACT)	
Judge	Malcolm Lee	30 March 1994	1 May 2006	12 years, 32 days		
Judge	John von Doussa	30 March 1994	15 August 2003	9 years, 138 days		
Judge	Michael Moore	30 March 1994	1 August 2011	17 years, 124 days	Additional Judge of the Supreme Court (ACT)	
Judge	Margaret Beazley	30 March 1994	28 April 1996	2 years, 30 days	Appointed to Court of Appeal (NSW)	
Judge	Shane Marshall	17 July 1995	21 November 2015	20 years, 127 days		
Judge	Anthony North	3 October 1995	11 September 2018	22 years, 343 days	Additional Judge of the Supreme Court (ACT)	
Judge	Rodney Madgwick	3 October 1995	21 April 2008	12 years, 201 days	Additional Judge of the Supreme Court (ACT)	
