= Kathleen Farrell (judge) =

Australian judge

The Honourable Justice Lucy Kathleen Farrell

Judge of the Federal Court of Australia
- Incumbent
- Assumed office 5 December 2012

Personal details
- Born: 1955 or 1956 (age 69–70)
- Education: Monte Sant'Angelo Mercy College; University of Sydney
- Occupation: Judge, Lawyer

Kathleen Farrell is an Australian judge. She has been a judge of the Federal Court of Australia since 2012 and among the very few solicitors to have been appointed directly to the court.

Farrell went to school at Monte Sant'Angelo Mercy College in North Sydney, and studied law and arts at the University of Sydney graduating with a Bachelor of Laws and a Bachelor of Arts in 1979. Farrell worked for her entire career as a solicitor at Freehills, from when she was admitted in July 1979, working with Kim Santow, David Gonski and James Allsop. She was promoted to partner in 1984, aged 28. In 1992 and 1993 Farrell was seconded from Freehills to be the National Coordinator for Enforcement at the Australian Securities Commission. In 2000 Farrell stepped back from partnership, becoming a consultant. Farrell also has experience as a director of various companies. Farrell was appointed a member of the Australian Takeovers Panel in 2001 and elevated to President of the panel from 2010, the first lawyer and first woman so appointed.

In 2012 Farrell was appointed a judge of the Federal Court due to her expertise in business and corporate law. Chief Justice Allsop attributed the appointment of women solicitors to the bench, such as Federal Court judges Farrell, and Brigitte Markovic, NSW Supreme Court judge Julie Ward and Anne Ferguson of the Supreme Court of Victoria, as being a function of the shortage of women barristers aged 50–55, with women being just 10% of senior counsel and 20% of barristers.

Farrell decided to retire as a judge of the Federal Court effective from 1 August 2023. In July 2023, she was publicly excoriated by her colleague Justice Jackman, to whom one of her extant matters had been allocated. In his judgment on the relevant case, Justice Jackman remarked on the lack of any evidence as to why Farrell had not herself delivered judgment on the matter despite its trial having occurred years prior: "As far as the evidence indicates, Farrell J has not suffered a protracted illness or otherwise become unable to continue with, or to give judgment in, the proceedings. I am not aware of any medical evidence to that effect." Justice Jackman also delivered apologies to the litigants on behalf of both himself and the Chief Justice: "The Chief Justice has apologised in correspondence to the parties and their legal representatives on behalf of the Court for this situation. I wish to add my own apology for what has transpired."

== See also ==
- List of Judges of the Federal Court of Australia
