= List of judges of the Federal Court of Bankruptcy =

Judges who served on the Federal Court of Bankruptcy are:

Position	Name	From	To	Term	Comments	Notes
Judge	Lionel Lukin	6 August 1930	31 October 1943	13 years, 86 days	Formerly a judge of the Supreme Court (Qld), judge of the Commonwealth Court of Conciliation and Arbitration. Subsequently a judge of the Supreme Court (ACT)	
Judge	George Dethridge	12 July 1935	29 December 1938	3 years, 170 days	Chief Judge of the Commonwealth Court of Conciliation and Arbitration	
Judge	Sir Thomas Clyne	11 July 1942	12 April 1967	24 years, 275 days	Formerly a judge of the County Court of Victoria (1939-1942); Subsequently a judge of the Supreme Court (ACT) (1943-1945)	
Judge	Harry Gibbs	26 June 1967	3 August 1970	3 years, 38 days	Judge of the Supreme Court (Qld) (1961–67) judge of the Supreme Court (ACT) (1967–70); Appointed to the High Court (1970–87)	
Judge	Charles Sweeney CBE	22 October 1970	29 June 1995	24 years, 250 days	Judge of the Commonwealth Industrial Court, Supreme Court (ACT) and Supreme Court (NT). Subsequently appointed to the Federal Court	
Judge	Bernard Riley	22 October 1973	4 August 1978	4 years, 286 days	Appointed to the Federal Court	
