= David Thomas (judge) =

Australian judge

David Thomas is a retired judge of the Federal Court of Australia and a former justice of the Supreme Court of Queensland in the Trial Division. He was appointed to the Supreme Court on 17 September 2013 and to the Federal Court on 27 June 2017. He served as the president of the Administrative Appeals Tribunal from the date of his appointment to the Federal Court until 31 January 2022. Prior to his appointment to the AAT he was the president of the Queensland Civil and Administrative Tribunal.

Thomas was previously a senior partner with Minter Ellison Lawyers. He is also the president of The Royal National Agricultural and Industrial Association of Queensland, deputy chair of Queensland Ballet, a director of The Society of The Sacred Advent Schools (the trustee of St Margaret's Anglican Girls' School and St Aidan's Anglican Girls' School) and an adjunct professor at Murdoch University. He retired from the bench on 31 January 2024.

== See also ==
- List of Judges of the Federal Court of Australia
