= Anthony North =

Australian judge

The Honourable Anthony North KC

Judge of the Federal Court of Australia
- In office 3 October 1995 – 11 September 2018

Judge of the Supreme Court of the Australian Capital Territory
- In office November 2003 – 11 September 2018

Personal details
- Born: Anthony Max North; 11 September 1948 (age 77) Melbourne, Australia

Anthony Max North KC is a retired Australian judge, who served as a Judge of the Federal Court of Australia from 3 October 1995 until 11 September 2018. He held appointments as a Judge of the Supreme Court of the Australian Capital Territory and the Industrial Relations Court of Australia.

Anthony Max North was born on September 11, 1948, to Jewish immigrants from Königsberg. His father changed the family surname from Norschield to North before he was born. He has one sister.

North graduated as Bachelor of Laws and Bachelor of Arts from the University of Melbourne. In 1973 he served as associate to Sir Ninian Stephen, then a Justice of the High Court of Australia. He graduated as Master of Laws from the University of London in 1975.

In 1976 he was admitted to the Victorian Bar. He held the part-time statutory appointment as Defence Force Advocate between 1993 and 1995.

He retired from the Court in September 2018.

In 2019 North was appointed by the Governor of Victoria as Chair of the Victorian Law Reform Commission.

== See also ==
- List of Judges of the Federal Court of Australia
- List of judges of the Industrial Relations Court of Australia
- List of Judges of the Supreme Court of the Australian Capital Territory
