= Wendy Abraham =

Australian judge

The Honourable Justice Wendy Jane Abraham

Judge of the Federal Court of Australia
- Incumbent
- Assumed office 7 May 2019

Personal details
- Born: 6 May 1960 (age 66)
- Education: University of Adelaide (LL.B (hons), 1982)
- Occupation: Judge and lawyer
- Awards: King's Counsel (1998)

Wendy Jane Abraham (born 6 May 1960) is a judge of the Federal Court of Australia, sitting in Sydney. She was appointed on 7 May 2019 for a term to end 6 May 2030. Abraham took silk in 1998 and is a member of the bars of South Australia (1982) and New South Wales (2005).

Abraham is an expert in criminal law. Beginning in 1983, she was a counsel to the Director of Public Prosecutions of South Australia, and later established a national criminal appellate practice. She appeared before the High Court of Australia for the Commonwealth Director of Public Prosecutions in R v Tang, securing the first criminal conviction for slavery in Australian history. In 2003, she advised the Australian Law Reform Commission on the use of genetic evidence in prosecutions.

== Notable cases ==
In her role as Crown Prosecutor with the South Australian Office of the Director of Public Prosecutions, Abraham led the prosecution in the Snowtown murders case, one of Australia's most notorious and complex serial murder trials. She prosecuted John Bunting and Robert Wagner, who were ultimately convicted of multiple murders. The trial, which lasted nearly a year, was one of the longest in South Australian legal history and required the jury to hear testimony from over 230 witnesses and review more than 1,000 exhibits.

Justice Abraham was assigned the Afghan Files case: Australian Broadcasting Corporation v Kane (No 2). She ruled in February 2020 that a warrant issued to the Australian Federal Police to search the offices of the Australian Broadcasting Corporation was valid.

== Works ==
- Abraham, Wendy (2011). "A Guide to Criminal Appeals in New South Wales". Bar News: The Journal of the New South Wales Bar Association: 73–78 – via Australasian Legal Information Institute.
