= List of judges of the Supreme Court of the Cocos (Keeling) Islands =

Judges who served on the Supreme Court of the Cocos (Keeling) Islands are:

Name	Position	From	To	Term	Comments	Notes
Martin Kriewaldt	Judge	23 November 1955	11 June 1960	4 years, 201 days		
Edward Arthur Dunphy	Judge	23 May 1961	31 December 1982	21 years, 222 days	Commonwealth Industrial Court (1956–1982); ACT Supreme Court (1958–1982); Supreme Court of Christmas Island (1961–1982); Supreme Court of Norfolk Island (1969–1982); Court of Appeal of Nauru (1967–1982)	
Sir William Forster	Judge	6 August 1980	30 January 1989	8 years, 177 days		
James Muirhead	Additional Judge	6 August 1980	4 August 1986	5 years, 363 days		
Robert French	Judge	9 May 1989	15 November 2000	11 years, 190 days		
Malcolm Lee	Additional Judge	9 May 1989	1 May 2006	16 years, 357 days		
