= Derrington (surname) =

Derrington is a surname. Notable people with the surname include:

- Bob Derrington (1930–2011), American race car driver
- Edwin Derrington (1830–1899), English-born Australian journalist and politician
- Jim Derrington (1939–2020), American baseball player
- Sarah Derrington (fl. 2008), Australian jurist and academic
