= Mordy Bromberg =

Australian judge and Australian rules footballer

The Honourable Justice Mordecai Bromberg SC

President of the Australian Law Reform Commission
- Incumbent
- Assumed office 10 July 2023
- Preceded by: Sarah Derrington

Judge of the Federal Court of Australia
- Incumbent
- Assumed office 7 December 2009

Personal details
- Born: 1959 (age 66–67) Israel
- Education: Monash University

Mordecai "Mordy" Bromberg SC (born 1959) is an Australian judge who was appointed to the Federal Court of Australia in 2009 and as President of the Australian Law Reform Commission in 2023. He was previously a senior barrister, and in his youth also played four seasons of Australian rules football for the St Kilda Football Club.

== Early life and education ==
Bromberg was born in Israel in 1959 and arrived in Australia with his family in 1967, shortly before the Six-Day War. His father became a supermarket proprietor in Melbourne.

Bromberg was educated at Brighton Road State School, Elsternwick State School, Elwood College, and Brighton Grammar School. He graduated with a Bachelor of Economics and a Bachelor of Laws from Monash University around 1984.

== Football ==
After playing junior Australian rules football at Brighton East, Bromberg began playing for St Kilda Football Club in the Victorian Football League (VFL) under-19 competition. Combining his law studies at Monash, he made his senior debut in the first round of the 1978 VFL season, against Fitzroy. He played 12 games in his first year, but lost his spot in the team in 1979 and fell out with coach Mike Patterson. Bromberg played the rest of the season with the all-Jewish AJAX Football Club in the Victorian Amateur Football Association (VAFA). He requested a clearance to Richmond at the end of 1979 but it was refused. Returning to St Kilda, he played 16 games in 1980 and four in 1981. He was released by the club at the end of the season after a career total of 34 VFL games. In 1982, he played one final season of football for Camberwell in the VFA.

== Politics ==
Prior to the 2001 federal election, he unsuccessfully contested Australian Labor Party (ALP) preselection for the Division of Burke, against Brendan O'Connor, who went on to win the seat.

== Legal career ==
Bromberg was admitted as a solicitor of the Supreme Court of Victoria and the Supreme Court of New South Wales in 1984. He was admitted to the Victorian Bar in 1988.

Bromberg was appointed Senior Counsel (SC) in 2003 and was president of the Australian Institute of Employment Rights from 2005. He had extensive practice in industrial and employment law, as well as some constitutional, trade practices, administrative law and discrimination cases.

His appointment to the Federal Court of Australia commenced on 7 December 2009.

He was appointed as President of the Australian Law Reform Commission, commencing on 10 July 2023.

=== Cases ===
He presided in Eatock v Bolt in the Federal Court, in which columnist Andrew Bolt was found to be in breach of Section 18C of the Racial Discrimination Act 1975.

In a 2021 case, Sharma v Minister for the Environment, Bromberg ruled that the federal Minister for the Environment had a duty of care, arising from the law of negligence, to protect children from climate change when considering whether to approve projects under the Environment Protection and Biodiversity Conservation Act 1999. Bromberg did not grant the injunction sought by the plaintiffs, a group of teenagers, who sought to bar the minister from approving an extension to the Vickery coal mine owned by Whitehaven Coal. Bromberg's ruling was unanimously overturned on appeal to the full bench of the Federal Court of Australia in 2022, with Chief Justice James Allsop stating government policy should be determined by the government and not by the courts.

In April 2023, a Federal Court ruling determined in favour of the native title application lodged by Anangu seven years earlier for around 10,000 km^{2} (3,900 sq mi) of pastoral lease land in the Northern Territory, that includes Erldunda, Lyndavale, and Curtin Springs cattle stations. This was the first recognition of commercial rights in Central Australia, and was handed down by Bromberg at a gathering in the remote community of Imanpa.

== See also ==
- List of Judges of the Federal Court of Australia
