= Malcolm Lee =

Malcolm Lee may refer to:

- Malcolm D. Lee, American actor, film director, and screenwriter
- Malcolm Lee (basketball), American basketball player
- Malcolm Lee (judge), former Federal Court of Australia judge

== See also ==
- Malcolm Leigh, director, see Games That Lovers Play
