= Chief Justice of the Federal Court =

Chief Justice of the Federal Court may refer to:

- Chief Justice of Malaysia
- Chief Justice of Canada's Federal Court.
- Chief Justice of the Federal Court of Australia
