= Xavier Connor =

Australian judge (1917 - 2005)

Judge of the Federal Court of Australia
- In office 1977–1982

Personal details
- Born: Francis Xavier Connor; 12 December 1917
- Died: 27 December 2005 (aged 88)
- Occupation: Judge, jurist

Xavier Connor Known professionally as Xavier Connor, he was Chair of the Victorian Bar Council from 1967 to 1969. He was appointed a Justice of the Supreme Court of the Australian Capital Territory in 1972 and was made a foundation judge of the Federal Court of Australia in 1977, serving on this court until 1982.

Justice Connor served as President of the Australian Law Reform Commission from 1985 to 1987, President of the Courts-Martial Appeal Tribunal (1979), Chairman of the Parole Board of the ACT (1978-1985), Head of the Board of Inquiry into Casinos in Victoria (1982) and Chairman of the Committee of Review of the Special Broadcasting Service (1994).

Connor was interviewed in 1995 about his career. The recording can be found in the National Library of Australia.

== See also ==
- Judiciary of Australia
- Victorian Bar
