= Roger Gyles =

Australian judge (1938–2025)

The Honourable Roger Vincent Gyles AO, KC

Judge of the Federal Court of Australia
- In office 11 June 1999 – 22 August 2008

Additional judge, Supreme Court (ACT)
- In office 2001 – 22 August 2008

Acting Judge of Appeal, Supreme Court (NSW)
- In office 1 September 2008 – 31 December 2008

Personal details
- Born: 22 August 1938 Sydney, Australia
- Died: 2 March 2025 (aged 86) Sydney, New South Wales, Australia
- Spouse: Alison Gyles née Logan
- Children: 4
- Parent: H Gyles
- Education: Newington College; University of Sydney
- Occupation: Judge

Roger Vincent Gyles AO KC (22 August 1938 – 2 March 2025) was an Australian judge who was the Independent National Security Legislation Monitor. In that role he was tasked to monitor and examine the Australian Government's new counter-terrorism legislation. He had previously been an Acting Judge of the Court of Appeal of the Supreme Court of New South Wales, a judge of the Federal Court of Australia and a Royal Commissioner.

== Background ==
Gyles was educated at Newington College (1950–1954) and graduated from the University of Sydney with First Class Honours in Law in 1961.

Gyles died in Sydney on 2 March 2025, at the age of 86.

== Legal career ==
After practising as a solicitor, Gyles was admitted to the New South Wales Bar in 1964 and took silk in 1975. He acted as Master in Equity in 1975 and as a Judge of the Supreme Court of New South Wales in 1989. Between 1982 and 1984, he acted as Special Commonwealth Prosecutor into Bottom of the harbour tax avoidance, and between 1990 and 1992 he was Royal Commissioner into the Building Industry in New South Wales. He had been President of both the New South Wales and Australian Bar Associations. Gyles was a Judge of the Federal Court of Australia from 1999 to 2008 and then an Acting Judge of the Court of Appeal of the Supreme Court of New South Wales. He had served as an additional judge of the Supreme Court of the Australian Capital Territory, a Deputy President of the Australian Competition Tribunal, a Presidential Member of the Administrative Appeals Tribunal and an Arbitrator of the Court of Arbitration for Sport. In December 2014 Gyles was named the Independent National Security Legislation Monitor.

== Honours ==
- Officer, Order of Australia (2000) − For service to the legal profession and the judiciary, particularly as a Royal Commissioner and Special Prosecutor, and to the community.
