= Michael Lee (judge) =

Australian judge

The Honourable Justice Michael Lee

Judge of the Federal Court of Australia
- Incumbent
- Assumed office 27 March 2017

Personal details
- Born: Michael Bryan Joshua Lee; 1 June 1965 (age 61) Perth, Western Australia
- Occupation: Judge, Barrister

Michael Bryan Joshua Lee (born 1 June 1965) is an Australian jurist and former barrister who has served as a judge of the Federal Court of Australia since 27 March 2017, in the Sydney Registry of the Court. He is a National Coordinating Judge in both the Commercial and Corporations National Practice Area and the Defamation sub-area in the Other Federal Jurisdiction National Practice Area. He is also a long admirer of the Arts, including a tenure as Director of the Bell Shakespeare Company.

== Education ==
Lee was born in Perth in 1965 but was raised in Sydney where he attended Marist Brothers' High School, Eastwood. Lee graduated in law from the University of Sydney.

== Career ==
Lee commenced work as a solicitor in 1989 with Corrs Chambers Westgarth, he was made a Senior Associate in 1992 and then appointed the firm's youngest partner in 1995. He eventually became Senior Litigation Partner and National Practice Group Leader before being called to the bar. He went to the New South Wales Bar in 2002 and took silk in 2011. He was counsel for the John Marsden Australian defamation case, and the Australian political assassination case of Phuong Ngo. While at the Bar, Lee primarily appeared in Sydney and Melbourne, but also conducted cases in every superior State and Territory Court throughout the Commonwealth.

He was appointed to the Federal Court in 2017 and is also an Additional Judge of the Supreme Court of the Australian Capital Territory.

He is the section editor for the Australian Law Journal section on class actions and is a Fellow of the University of Melbourne.

== Publications and seminars ==
- Varying Funding Agreements and Freedom of Contract: Some Observations by The Hon Justice Lee (IMF Bentham Class Actions Research Initiative with UNSW Law: Resolving Class Actions Effectively and Fairly), 1 June 2017
- Certification of Class Actions: A 'Solution' in Search of a Problem? by The Hon Justice Lee (A paper presented to the Commercial Law Association Seminar "Class Actions – Different Perspectives"), 20 October 2017
- Case Management & Insolvency: Matching Rhetoric & Reality, by The Hon Justice Lee (Key Note Speech at the Association of Independent Insolvency Practitioners Annual Conference), 28 June 2019
- Public Confidence, Apprehended Bias, and the Modern Federal Judiciary (AAL/ALRC Seminar), Judicial Impartiality eNews, February 2021
- Washington Diaries of Owen Dixon: Review by Justice Lee, Southern Highlands Newsletter #241, March 2021

== See also ==
- Judges of the Federal Court of Australia
- Swearing-in Ceremony for the Hon Justice Michael Lee, NSW Bar Association, 20/04/2017
- Silks appointed as new Federal Court of Australia judges, Australasian Lawyer, 28 Mar 2017
- Two new Judges appointed to Federal Court, Lawyers Weekly 30 March 2017
