= Jeffrey Spender (judge) =

Australian judge

The Honourable Jeffrey Ernest John Spender KC

Judge of the Federal Court of Australia
- In office 17 May 1984 – 19 July 2010

Personal details
- Spouse: Glenice Spender
- Children: Fiona, Duncan, and Tom

Jeffrey Ernest John Spender KC is a former Judge of the Federal Court of Australia that served from 17 May 1984 to 19 July 2010.

Jeff Spender graduated from the University of Queensland in 1964 with a Bachelor of Science, with honours in Mathematics. From 1967 until 1984 he practised at the Queensland Bar. In 1968 he obtained a Bachelor of Arts and a Bachelor of Laws at the University of Queensland. In 1972 Spender graduated from the University of London with a Master of Laws. In 1983, he was appointed Queen's Counsel.

Spender served as a presidential member of the Administrative Appeals Tribunal, and as a judge of the Industrial Relations Court of Australia. He served as an additional judge of the Supreme Court of the Australian Capital Territory. He was appointed a member of the Court of Appeal of the Kingdom of Tonga in 2001.
