= Ian Jackman =

Australian judge

The Honourable Justice Ian Jackman
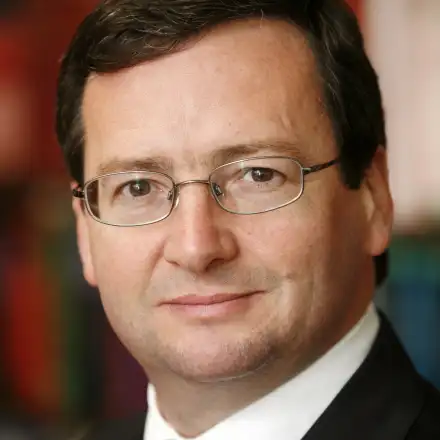

Judge of the Federal Court of Australia
- Incumbent
- Assumed office 6 February 2023
- Appointed by: Mark Dreyfus
- Preceded by: Jayne Jagot

Personal details
- Education: University of Sydney
- Occupation: Judge, barrister

Ian McNeil Jackman SC is a judge of the Federal Court of Australia.

== Early life and education ==
Ian Jackman was born in England to Grace Mcneil and Christopher Jackman, a Cambridge-educated accountant for PricewaterhouseCoopers. At age four, his family migrated to Australia as ten-pound Poms. He has four siblings including Hugh Jackman.

Jackman was raised in the North Shore area of Sydney and was a student at Knox Grammar School from 1972 to 1980. During his time there, he was vice-captain, Dux of the School and achieved the second highest HSC mark in New South Wales in 1980.

Jackman attended the University of Sydney, whilst residing at St Andrew's College, earning a Bachelor of Arts with Honours in 1984. He won the Rhodes Scholarship for New South Wales and continued his studies at the University of Oxford where he completed a Bachelor of Arts (Jurisprudence) (Hons I) in 1987 and a Bachelor of Civil Law in 1988.

While at Sydney University, Jackman played rugby with the Sydney University Football Club and among his teammates was former Prime Minister Tony Abbott and former Wallaby Nick Farr-Jones.

== Career ==
Jackman was an Associate to the Honourable Justice Gummow before joining the NSW bar in 1989 and reading under Bret Walker SC. He practised at Eight Selborne Chambers and specialised in commercial and company law. In 2002, he was appointed Senior Counsel. He was a member of the Commonwealth Government's Takeovers Panel from 2014. He represented insurers in COVID-19 business interruption cases in the Federal Court and the High Court. On 6 February 2023, Jackman was appointed to the Federal Court of Australia, replacing the Honourable Justice Jagot following her appointment to the High Court of Australia.
