= Michael Feutrill =

Australian judge

The Honourable Justice Michael Feutrill SC

Judge of the Federal Court of Australia
- Incumbent
- Assumed office 8 March 2022
- Appointed by: Michaelia Cash

Personal details
- Education: University of Western Australia
- Occupation: Judge, barrister

Michael James Feutrill SC is a judge of the Federal Court of Australia. Michael Feutrill was born in Western Australia and attended Guildford Grammar School from the age of eight. Feutrill graduated from the University of Western Australia with a Bachelor of Economics and a Bachelor of Law in 1996. and attained a Master of Laws from the University of Western Australia in 2007.

Feutrill was appointed senior counsel in 2018. He was appointed as a judge of the Federal Court in the Perth registry on 8 March 2022.
