= John Dowsett =

Australian judge

The Honourable John Dowsett AM KC

Justice, Federal Court of Australia
- In office 14 September 1998 – 26 April 2018

Justice, Supreme Court of Queensland
- In office 1985–1998

Personal details
- Born: John Alfred Dowsett

John Alfred Dowsett AM KC is a former judge of the Federal Court of Australia.

Justice Dowsett was appointed to the Federal Court on 14 September 1998. Prior to his appointment to the Federal Court, he served as a judge of the Supreme Court of Queensland from 1985.

Before his appointment to the Supreme Court of Queensland, Justice Dowsett practised as a barrister in Queensland. He was appointed as a Queen's Counsel in 1982.

== Honours ==
On 11 June 2012, Justice Dowsett was named a Member of the Order of Australia for "service to the law and to the judiciary, to professional associations, and to legal education in the area of litigation and dispute resolution."

== See also ==
- List of Judges of the Federal Court of Australia
