= Stewart Anderson (judge) =

Australian judge of the Federal Court of Australia

The Honourable Justice Stewart Anderson

Judge of the Federal Court of Australia
- Incumbent
- Assumed office 6 May 2019

Personal details
- Born: Melbourne, Victoria
- Education: Monash University
- Occupation: Judge, lawyer

Stewart Maxwell Anderson KC is an Australian jurist and a judge of the Federal Court of Australia. Formerly a highly regarded barrister experienced in commercial litigation, Anderson was appointed to the Federal Court in 2019.

Anderson attended Scotch College, Melbourne. He graduated with a Bachelor of Economics from Monash University in 1981. He went on to graduate from the Monash University Faculty of Law with a Bachelor of Laws with honours in 1983 and completed a Diploma of Commercial Law in 1987. He was admitted to legal practice in 1985 and worked as a solicitor at Molomby & Molomby before joining the Victorian Bar in 1987. He specialised in commercial law with an emphasis on corporate law, banking and finance, superannuation and private law. He was appointed King's Counsel in 2010.
