= Monte Sant'Angelo Mercy College =

Monte Sant' Angelo Mercy College

Location
- Miller Street, North Sydney, New South Wales; Australia; 33°50′9″S 151°12′24″E

Information
- Type: Independent single-sex secondary day school
- Motto: Latin: Religio Scientia Cultus (Religion, Knowledge, Culture)
- Religious affiliations: Sisters of Mercy; Australasian Mercy Secondary Schools Association
- Denomination: Roman Catholicism
- Established: 1875; 151 years ago
- Founder: Mother Ignatius McQuoin
- Educational authority: New South Wales Department of Education
- Chairman: Steven Rubic
- Principal: Nicole Christensen
- Teaching staff: 118.3 FTE
- Years: 7–12
- Gender: Girls
- Enrolment: 1186 (2025)
- Campus type: Suburban
- Colours: Blue and white
- Nickname: Monte; Monte Sant'Angelo
- Affiliations: Association of Heads of Independent Schools of Australia; Alliance of Girls Schools Australasia; Association of Heads of Independent Girls' Schools
- Website: www.monte.nsw.edu.au

Monte Sant'Angelo Mercy College (commonly referred to as Monte Sant'Angelo or Monte) is an independent Roman Catholic single-sex secondary day school for girls, located in North Sydney, New South Wales, Australia.

Founded by the Sisters of Mercy in 1875, Monte is the oldest independent girls school on Sydney's north shore, and caters for approximately 1,200 students from Year 7 to Year 12.

The College is affiliated with the Association of Heads of Independent Schools of Australia (AHISA), the Australasian Mercy Secondary Schools Association (AMSSA), the Alliance of Girls Schools Australasia (AGSA), and is an affiliate member of the Association of Heads of Independent Girls' Schools (AHIGS).

Since 2007, Monte has offered its students the option of the International Baccalaureate Diploma (IB) program. Including the MYP and SYP programs.

== History ==
Monte Sant'Angelo is the oldest independent girls' school on Sydney's north shore. The College was established in 1865, on the corner of Miller and McLaren Street, North Sydney, by Mother Ignatius McQuoin of the Sisters of Mercy. By 1879, the school had outgrown its original site and subsequently moved to its current location at Miller Street. The name of the College is taken from Monte Sant'Angelo, a centre of religion, culture and learning in Gargano, Italy.

== Principals ==
Period	Details
1865–1885	Mother M. Ignatius McQuoin
1893–1896	Mother M. Stanislaus Real
1896–1902	Mother M. Aloysius Casey
1902–1908	Mother M. Gertrude McLaughlin
1908–1911	Mother M. Aloysius Casey
1911–1912	Mother M. Patrick Halloway
1912–1922	M. Ambrose Geary
1923–1946	M. Clement Flanagan
1947–1972	M. Baptista Rankin
1973–1994	Maureen McGuirk
1994–1999	Sharon Price
2000–2003	Beverley Johnson
2004–2014	Catherine Alcock
2014–present	Nicole Christensen

== Campus ==
Monte Sant'Angelo is situated on a single campus centrally located in North Sydney. The college facilities include multi-purpose courts, a library, a religious education centre, a creative arts and technology building, music rooms, a chapel, and an indoor swimming pool in McQuoin Center and sports centre.

== Co-curriculum ==
=== Sport ===
Monte offers a variety of sporting activities to its students including aerobics, athletics, basketball, cricket, dance, fencing, gymnastics, hockey, netball, softball, swimming, soccer, tennis, touch football, Tae Kwon Do, volleyball, and water polo.

=== Musicals ===
Monte associates with all-boys schools such as Aloysius, Marist, Shore, Riverview and Joeys to create a musical. The musical Annie was performed in 2008. In 2009, the Broadway musical Les Misérables was performed with a collaboration from Aloys and St. Mary's male students. The school musicals are performed every second year.

In 2012, Monte collaborated with local boys schools to produce a stage version of Beauty and the Beast and in 2014, Hairspray. In 2018, Monte collaborated with other local boys' schools for their production of High School Musical. In March 2020 the school was due to produce several performances of Wicked, which were suspended due to the COVID-19 pandemic.

=== House plays ===
House plays are musicals that each colour house choreographs and later performs. The plays are run by the year eleven students, who choose music, dance routines, story line and performance costumes for their house. Practices are held on Fridays and Saturdays at the school. The performance is generally held on a Saturday, with a matinee performance added to the schedule in 2009. The criteria of House Plays are usually the theme and message, but visuals and music are also judged.

== Notable alumni ==
Media, entertainment and the arts

- Kitty Flanagan – comedian, writer and actor
- Penny Flanagan – musician and novelist
- Antonia Kidman – journalist and television presenter, younger sister of actress Nicole Kidman
- Jodie Speers – Journalist
- Simone Young – conductor

Politics, public service and the law

- Kerry Chikarovski – former NSW Liberal Opposition Leader
- Kathleen Farrell – Judge Federal Court of Australia
- Jacqueline Gleeson – High Court Judge of Australia
- Jackie Kelly – Federal Liberal Member of Parliament
- Robyn Read – former Independent NSW Member of Parliament for North Shore; Alderman, North Sydney Council and author.

Science and medicine

- Margery Scott-Young – surgeon

== See also ==
- List of Catholic schools in New South Wales
- Catholic education in Australia
