= Natalie Charlesworth =

Australian judge

The Honourable Justice Natalie Charlesworth

Judge of the Federal Court of Australia
- Incumbent
- Assumed office 1 March 2016

Personal details
- Born: 1969 or 1970 (age 56–57) Port Augusta, South Australia
- Education: University of South Australia; Australian National University
- Occupation: Judge, Lawyer

Natalie Charlesworth is an Australian judge, sitting on the Federal Court of Australia.

== Early life and education ==
Charlesworth was born and raised in Port Augusta, South Australia. Charlesworth moved to Adelaide to study at the University of South Australia earning her Bachelor of Arts degree in journalism in 1991. She spent a decade working as a journalist. Charlesworth then earned a Bachelor of Laws degree from Australian National University (ANU) in Canberra. Charlesworth also holds a Graduate Diploma in Legal Practice from ANU.

== Career ==
Charlesworth started her career as an associate to the Hon. Justice John Mansfield AM QC of the Federal Court. She then worked for the South Australian Crown Solicitor's Office, as solicitor, and later senior solicitor. She became a senior associate with Kelly & Co Lawyers. Charlesworth became a barrister in 2007 and was listed by Doyle's Guide as a leading employment law barrister in Adelaide in 2015, and 2016.

On 25 February 2016, George Brandis, the Attorney-General of Australia, announced Charlesworth's appointment to the Federal Court of Australia, effective 1 March 2016. Charlesworth was appointed to the Adelaide registry, replacing the retiring Justice Mansfield.

=== Federal Court rulings ===
In December 2016, Charlesworth ruled in favour of a French wine company Pernod Ricard, in its use of the term 'Signature' to market its higher end Jacob's Creek Barossa Valley Australian wines, finding the company did not infringe upon Australian winery Yalumba's trademark.

Charlesworth presided over Radio Adelaide's lawsuit against ABC over ABC's attempt to re-brand one of its stations in November 2017. Charlesworth granted an injunction in favour of Radio Adelaide.

In 2019, 2021 and 2022 Charlesworth presided over several native title cases, granting title rights to the Nukunu and Barngarla peoples of the western Flinders Ranges area of South Australia. The border between the two groups of area around Port Augusta, which had been disputed for around 28 years, was settled by these decisions.

== Personal life ==
Charlesworth is the mother of three children.

== See also ==
- List of judges of the Federal Court of Australia
