= Adam Hatcher =

Australian Judge

The Honourable Justice Adam Hatcher

Judge of the Federal Court of Australia
- Incumbent
- Assumed office 19 February 2023

President of the Fair Work Commission
- Incumbent
- Assumed office 19 February 2023
- Preceded by: Iain Ross

Personal details
- Occupation: Judge, barrister

Adam Hatcher SC is an Australian jurist and former barrister who has served as a judge of the Federal Court of Australia and President of the Australian Fair Work Commission since 19 February 2023. He previously served as the Fair Work Commission's vice-president from 2013 to 2023.

Hatcher previously served as chief legal adviser with the NSW branch of the Transport Workers' Union. He became a barrister in 1997 and was appointed Senior Counsel in 2010.

In 2013, Hatcher was appointed by then-Minister for Employment and Workplace Relations, Bill Shorten, as one of two new vice presidents of the Fair Work Commission.

On 10 November 2022, Hatcher was appointed by Minister for Employment and Workplace Relations Tony Burke as acting president of the Commission following the retirement of Justice Iain Ross. He was subsequently appointed president substantively by Burke on 9 February 2023, with his role commencing on 19 February 2023. Burke cited Hatcher's "extensive experience to the role" as a reason for his appointment.
