= Elizabeth Raper =

Judge of the Federal Court of Australia

The Honourable Justice Elizabeth Raper

Judge of the Federal Court of Australia
- Incumbent
- Assumed office 1 April 2022
- Appointed by: Michaelia Cash

Personal details
- Education: University of Sydney
- Occupation: Jurist

Elizabeth Raper SC is a judge of the Federal Court of Australia.

== Early life and education ==
Raper attended the University of Sydney, earning a Bachelor of Arts in 1996 and a Bachelor of Laws with Honours in 1998.

== Career ==
Raper's legal career began at the Australian Industrial Relations Commission, where she served as an Associate to Justice Paul Munro. She later worked as a lawyer in private practice at Baker and McKenzie. Raper also worked in academia at the University of Sydney and co-authored a text on discrimination law.

Raper has served as a judge since 1 April 2022. She was appointed by then Attorney-General Michaelia Cash to the Sydney Registry of the Federal Court following the retirement of Justice Geoffrey Flick.

== Notable cases ==
In October 2022, as a Federal Court judge, Raper presided over a high-profile industrial dispute between the Government of New South Wales and the Rail, Tram and Bus Union.

A native title claim covering thousands of square kilometres, including agricultural land as well as several small towns along the Barrier Highway in South Australia, was lodged in 2012 by Maureen, Glen, and Dulcie O'Donnell, on behalf of the Wilyakali people. Native title was finally formally recognised on 28 August 2023, in a decision handed down by Justice Raper.
