= Timothy McEvoy =

Judge of the Federal Court of Australia

The Honourable Justice Timothy McEvoy SC

Judge of the Federal Court of Australia
- Incumbent
- Assumed office 26 April 2022
- Appointed by: Christian Porter

Judge of the Family Court of Australia
- In office 27 March 2019 – 25 April 2022
- Appointed by: Christian Porter

Personal details
- Education: University of Melbourne, University of Virginia
- Occupation: Jurist

Timothy McEvoy is a judge of the Federal Court in Australia. He was appointed by Christian Porter and has served in the position since 26 April 2022. McEvoy acted as pro-bono lawyer to former Prime Minister Tony Abbott in a defamation claim against unionist John Setka in 2013-2014. McEvoy initially served on the Family Court of Australia. His appointment was met with criticism owing to his lack of experience in family law at the time. McEvoy is an alumnus of the University of Melbourne, where he was a resident of Ormond College and graduated with bachelor degrees in arts and law, as well as a Master of Laws. In 1998, McEvoy obtained Doctor of Juridical Science from the University of Virginia. He then commenced his legal career as an Associate to then Chief Justice of the Federal Court in 1994 and was admitted to the Supreme Court of Victoria and High Court of Australia in 1996. After spending time working in private practice at Herbert Smith Freehills, McEvoy was admitted to the Victorian Bar where he practised as a barrister until his appointment to the Family Court.
