= Anna Katzmann =

Australian judge

The Honourable Justice Anna Judith Katzmann

Judge of the Federal Court of Australia
- In office 2 February 2010 – 24 June 2025

Personal details
- Born: 1955 (age 70–71)
- Education: Sydney Girls High School; University of New South Wales
- Occupation: Judge, barrister

Anna Judith Katzmann SC (born 1955) is an Australian lawyer and a retired judge of the Federal Court of Australia.

== Early life and education ==
Katzmann grew up in the eastern suburbs of Sydney, attending Clovelly Primary School, completing her primary education at Woollahra Demonstration School. Katzmann attended the academically selective Sydney Girls High School where she was elected school captain. She studied arts and law at the University of New South Wales, graduating with a Bachelor of Laws and Honours in Arts in 1979.

== Career ==
Katzmann became a barrister after graduating, also working as a lecturer at the NSW Institute of Technology. She was appointed Senior Counsel in 1997. Katzmann was elected as a member of the Bar Council continuously from 1994 until 2010, holding every position, including as president from late 2007 until 2009.

=== Federal Court ===
Katzmann was sworn in as a judge of the Federal Court of Australia on 2 February 2010. She served until her retirement on 24 June 2025.

== See also ==
- List of Judges of the Federal Court of Australia
