= Donnell Ryan =

Australian judge (1941–2023)

The Honourable Donnell Michael Ryan KC

Judge of the Federal Court of Australia
- In office 29 September 1986 – 2 June 2011

Personal details
- Born: 3 June 1941
- Died: 26 August 2023 (aged 82)

Donnell Michael Ryan KC (3 June 1941 – 26 August 2023) was an Australian barrister, solicitor and judge of the Federal Court of Australia. He served on the Federal Court of Australia from 29 September 1986 until 2 June 2011 and was a member of the Victorian Bar.

== Early life ==
Donnell Ryan was educated at Dandenong High School, Melbourne, and graduated from the University of Melbourne with an honours degree in law and an arts degree.

== Career ==
Ryan entered the Victorian Bar as a barrister and solicitor on 1 April 1965, where he worked in general practice as a Junior Counsel. He practised industrial, commercial, constitutional and administrative law. From 1965 to 1969 Ryan was a teaching fellow in law at Monash University, and from 1966 to 1971 was tutor at the College of Legal Education.

In 1980, Ryan took his silk to become a Queen Counsel in Victoria, and was admitted to New South Wales in 1982. He joined the Federal Court of Australia in 1986. He appeared in the NSW Supreme Court, Victoria Supreme Court, Supreme Court of the Australian Capital Territory, High Court, the Industrial Relations Court of Australia, the Conciliation and Arbitration Commission, the NSW Industrial Commission and specialist tribunals. Ryan served as acting Chairman at the Victorian Liquor Control Commission and Senior Counsel assisting the Hope Royal Commission into Australia's Security Organisations. From 1984 to 1990 Ryan was part-time commissioner on the Australian Law Reform Commission. Ryan was involved in drafting the Admiralty Act 1988.

Ryan retired from being a judge in 2011 and took up the office of Independent Assessor, Special Building Industry Powers. In 2014–2015, Ryan conducted an Independent Review of the “Melbourne Response” to allegations of sexual abuse within the Catholic Archdiocese of Melbourne.

== Personal life and death ==
Donnell Ryan was married to Gabrielle, and had one son and one daughter.

Ryan died on 26 August 2023, at the age of 82.

== Sources ==
- "Former Judges of the Federal Court of Australia". Federal Court of Australia.
- "Donnell Michael Ryan Death Notice". The Age.
