= Brigitte Markovic =

Australian judge

The Honourable Justice Brigitte Sandra Markovic

Judge of the Federal Court of Australia
- Incumbent
- Assumed office 24 August 2015

Personal details
- Born: 1964 or 1965 (age 60–61)
- Spouse: Jonathan Kay Hoyle
- Education: Ascham School; University of New South Wales
- Occupation: Judge, solicitor

Brigitte Sandra Markovic is an Australian judge. She has been a judge of the Federal Court of Australia, based in Sydney, since 2015.

Markovic was born in Sydney, the daughter of Holocaust survivors. She was educated at Ascham School and the University of New South Wales, graduating with a Bachelor of Laws and a Bachelor of Commerce in 1987. She was a solicitor at Clayton Utz from 1988 until her appointment to the court in 2015. She was appointed as a partner in Clayton Utz in 1997, becoming one of the firm's youngest partners at the age of 32. She was based in Canberra from 1997 to 2000, where she established Clayton Utz's federal government practice. She was made managing partner heading the firm's Litigation and Dispute Resolution group in 2010. Her areas of practise as a solicitor included corporations, insolvency, commercial and administrative law, and her cases included representing the Australian Securities & Investments Commission in litigation over the HIH Insurance collapse and their civil prosecution of James Hardie.

She was appointed to the Federal Court by Attorney-General George Brandis on 11 August 2015, taking effect from 24 August. On her appointment, Brandis described her as "one of Australia’s foremost litigation lawyers".

She is married to barrister Jonathan Kay Hoyle.

== See also ==
- List of Judges of the Federal Court of Australia
