= Reg Graycar =

Australian lawyer and academic

Regina "Reg" Graycar is an Australian lawyer and academic. By 1992 she was an associate professor at the University of New South Wales, and already working on the ways in which the law was biased against women. From 1997 to 2012 she was a professor of law at the University of Sydney and she served as Commissioner of the NSW Law Reform Commission from 1998 to 2002. She has served on the advisory board for the Australian Feminist Law Journal. Since her return to the NSW bar in late 2012 she became emeritus professor of the Law School of the University of Sydney. She is currently (2024) a senior member of the NSW Civil and Administrative Tribunal.

Graycar was awarded a Bachelor of Laws (Hons) degree from the University of Adelaide in 1978 and a Master of Laws degree from Harvard University in 1981.

Graycar has explored the concept of family under Australian law, gender bias in Australian law & judgments, working at the intersection of feminism and the law, and is co-author with Jenny Morgan of The Hidden Gender of Law. Her work addresses the systematic failures of the legal system for those who are largely unrepresented in the legal system, including not only women, but adolescents, the institutionally abused, and aborigenes. Given that she is addressing systemic failure, her work encompasses administrative law, constitutional law, the law of torts, legal systems and processes, together with law reform and legal responses to systemic injuries.
