= Sarah Derrington =

Australian judge

The Honourable Justice Sarah Derrington AM FAAL

Judge of the Federal Court of Australia
- Incumbent
- Assumed office 10 January 2018

President of the Australian Law Reform Commission
- In office 10 January 2018 – 9 January 2023
- Preceded by: Robert Cornall (acting); Rosalind Croucher (substantive)
- Succeeded by: Mordy Bromberg

Personal details
- Spouse: Justice Roger Derrington
- Education: University of Queensland
- Occupation: Judge, Academic

Sarah Catherine Derrington (née Johnstone) AM FAAL is an Australian jurist and academic. She has served as President of the Australian Law Reform Commission and as a Judge of the Federal Court of Australia since 10 January 2018. She was previously Dean of Law at the University of Queensland from 2013 to 2018.

== Early life and education ==
Derrington was educated at St Anne's School in Townsville, Mentone Girls’ Grammar in Melbourne, St Hilda's, Southport before finishing her secondary education at St Margaret's Anglican Girls' School. She then studied at the University of Queensland, from where she holds a BA in French and German, a Bachelor of Laws (Hons), a Master of Laws, and a Doctor of Philosophy in the field of marine insurance law. In 1990, she was admitted to the Bar in Queensland and as a Barrister & Solicitor of the Supreme Court of the ACT.

== Career ==
Derrington pursued dual careers in both academia and as a barrister specialising in maritime and shipping law and general commercial law, and has co-authored a number of texts on admiralty law. She was appointed as Professor of Admiralty Law at the University of Queensland in 2008. In 2013, she was appointed as the university's Dean of Law, the first woman to hold the position.

=== Appointment to Australian Law Reform Commission and Federal Court ===
In November 2017, Derrington was appointed by Attorney-General George Brandis as President of the Australian Law Reform Commission and also as a Judge of the Federal Court of Australia.

As President of the Law Reform Commission, Derrington presided over reports into Class Actions and Third-party Litigation Funders (ALRC Report 134); Family Law (ALRC Report 135) and Corporate Criminal Responsibility (ALRC Report 136).

== Personal life and honours ==
Derrington is married to Justice Roger Derrington who was appointed to the Federal Court in 2017. They have three children.

In 2009, Derrington was appointed as a Fellow of the Australian Academy of Law. In 2022, she was appointed as a Member of the Order of Australia in the 2022 Queen's Birthday Honours for "significant service to the judiciary and to the law, and to legal education".

== See also ==
- List of Judges of the Federal Court of Australia
