= Lisa Hespe =

Judge of the Federal Court of Australia

The Honourable Justice Lisa Hespe SC

Judge of the Federal Court of Australia
- Incumbent
- Assumed office 27 April 2022

Personal details
- Education: Monash University, University of Melbourne
- Occupation: Jurist

Lisa Hespe SC is an Australian jurist who has served as a judge of the Federal Court of Australia since 27 April 2022. She replaced Justice Paul Anastassiou. Hespe completed her secondary education at Leibler Yavneh College. She then completed a Bachelor of Economics in 1991 and a Bachelor of Laws with Honours in 1994 at Monash University. She earned a Master of Laws from Melbourne Law School in 2022. Hespe commenced her legal career practising as a lawyer with law firm King & Wood Mallesons, where she specialised in taxation and mergers and acquisitions. She is a lecturer at the University of Melbourne, where she teaches tax litigation, and she has spent time as a Senior Member of the Administrative Appeals Tribunal.
