= Australian Law Reform Commission =

Independent statutory body

Agency overview
- Formed: 11 November 1996
- Preceding agency: Law Reform Commission
- Jurisdiction: Commonwealth of Australia
- Employees: 16 (at June 2024)
- Agency executive: Mordy Bromberg, President
- Website: www.alrc.gov.au

The Australian Law Reform Commission (often abbreviated to ALRC) is an Australian independent statutory body established to conduct reviews into the law of Australia. The reviews, also called inquiries or references, are referred to the ALRC by the Attorney-General for Australia. Based on its research and consultations throughout an inquiry, the ALRC makes recommendations to government so that government can make informed decisions about law reform.

The ALRC is part of the Attorney-General's Department portfolio; however it is an independent statutory authority constituted under the Australian Law Reform Commission Act 1996 (Cth), and the Public Governance, Performance and Accountability Act 2013 (PGPA Act). As an independent agency, it is able to undertake research, consultations and legal policy development, and to make recommendations to the Parliament, without fear or favour.

The ALRC's objective is to make recommendations for law reform that:

- bring the law into line with current conditions and needs
- remove defects in the law
- simplify the law
- adopt new or more effective methods for administering the law and dispensing justice, and
- provide improved access to justice.

When conducting an inquiry, the ALRC also monitors foreign legal systems to ensure Australia compares favourably with international best practice.

The ALRC aims to ensure that the proposals and recommendations it makes do not trespass unduly on personal rights and liberties of citizens, or make those rights and liberties unduly dependent on administrative, rather than judicial, decisions and, as far as practicable, are consistent with the International Covenant on Civil and Political Rights.

The ALRC must also have regard to any effect that its recommendations may have on the costs of access to, and dispensing of, justice.

== Background ==
The ALRC is the primary law reform agency for the Australian government. It has its origins in the Law Reform Commission, which was established in 1975 under the Law Reform Commission Act 1973. This legislation was superseded by the Australian Law Reform Commission Act 1996 (Cth) (the ALRC Act) which came into effect on 11 November 1996. The new act was intended to improve the structure and functions of the ALRC, consistent with the recommendations of the 1994 Report of the House of Representatives Standing Committee on Legal and Constitutional Affairs titled, Law Reform—the Challenge Continues.

== Constitution ==
Under the amendments to the ALRC Act in 2012, the Commission consists of a President and up to six other members (more commonly called Commissioners). The performance of the Commission's functions, and the exercise of its powers, are not affected merely because of one or more vacancies in its membership. The Attorney-General may, from time to time, appoint such other part-time members of the Commission as the Attorney-General considers necessary to enable the Commission to perform its functions. Full-time members are to be appointed by the Governor-General and part-time members are to be appointed by the Attorney-General. A member holds office for the term (of at least six months but not longer than five years) specified in his or her appointment, but is eligible for re-appointment.

== Law reform process ==
The process for each law reform project may differ according to the scope of inquiry, and the ALRC usually works within a particular framework when it develops recommendations for reform. An Inquiry begins with Terms of Reference delivered by the Attorney-General identifying an area of law that needs to be reviewed for various reasons including:

- there is community concern about a particular issue that needs to be addressed through the process of law reform
- recent events or legal cases have highlighted a deficiency with the law
- scientific or technological developments have made it necessary to update the law or create new laws.

An Issues Paper is usually the first official publication of an inquiry. It provides a preliminary look at issues surrounding the inquiry. It serves to educate the community about the range of the problems under consideration. Discussion Papers provide a detailed account of ALRC research, including a summary of the various consultations and submissions undertaken and received, and set out draft proposals for reform.

The ALRC makes a formal call for submissions whenever it releases an Issues Paper or Discussion Paper. Through the submissions it receives, the ALRC can gauge what people think about current laws, how they should be changed and can test its proposals for reform with stakeholders before finalising them.

ALRC Final Reports make specific recommendations for changes to the law or legal processes. In formulating recommendations, the ALRC draws not only on submissions, but also face to face consultations, academic and industry research, international research and models, and its considerable experience in law reform. The ALRC seeks to consult with people who have expertise and experience in the laws under review, as well as people likely to be affected by the laws in question. During the process of formulating recommendations, the ALRC has regard to any policy aims expressed in terms of Reference and the principles for reform identified for each particular inquiry, against which possible proposals are assessed.

The Attorney-General is required to table the Final Report in Parliament within 15 sitting days of receiving it, after which it can be made available to the public. The Australian Government decides whether to implement the recommendations, in whole or in part.

== Presidents ==
From	To	Title	Name	Postnominals
1975	1984	Chair	The Hon Michael Kirby	AC CMG
1984	1985	Chair	The Hon Murray Wilcox	AO QC
1985	1987	Chair	The Hon Xavier Connor	AO
1988	1993	Chair	The Hon Elizabeth Evatt	AC
1994	1999	President	Alan Rose	AO
1999	2009	President	Emeritus Professor David Weisbrot	AM
2009	2017	President	Emeritus Professor Rosalind Croucher	AM
2017	2018	Acting President	Robert Cornall	
2018	2023	President	The Hon Justice Sarah Derrington	AM
2023	Present	President	The Hon Justice Mordecai Bromberg	SC

== Commissioners ==
From	To	Name
1975	1975	Professor the Hon Gareth Evans AC KC
1975	1981	Associate Professor Gordon J Hawkins
1975	1981	Professor Alex C Castles
1975	1977	The Hon John Cain
1975	1979	The Hon Sir Francis Gerard Brennan AC KBE QC
1976	1978	Russell Scott
1976	1985	The Hon Murray Wilcox AO QC
1976	1979	Sir Zelman Cowen AC GMG GCVO PC QC
1976	1985	David St L Kelly AO
1976	1980	Howard Screiber
1976	1979	The Hon James Spigelman AC KC
1977	1981	Brian J Shaw QC
1977	1979	Allan N Hall AM
1978	1980	John Q Ewens CMG CBE QC
1978	1983	Bruce M Debelle AO KC
1978	1979	Professor Duncan Chappell
1979	1980	Dr John A Seymour
1979	1984	James Mazza
1980	1983	Associate Professor Robert Hayes
1980	1986	The Hon Tim Smith AM KC
1980	1983	G W P Aarons
1980	1984	The Hon Francis M Neasey
1981	1984	The Hon Gerald E Fitzgerald AC KC
1982	1990	Judge James Crawford AC SC
1982	1990	Mr Theodore Simos QC
1982	1987	Professor Alice Erh-Soon Tay AM
1983	1989	Professor David Hambly
1983	1985	Dr Michael Pryles AO PBM
1983	1990	Professor Michael R Chestermann
1984	1985	Sir Maurice Byers CBE QC
1985	1987	The Hon Josephine M Maxwell
1984	1987	The Hon Donnell Michael Ryan QC
1984	1986	Ronald W Harmer
1984	1987	George Zdenkowski
1984	1989	Professor Richard W Harding
1985	1989	Dr Nicholas Seddon
1986	1989	Richard Fisher AM
1986	1987	The Hon John Basten AO KC
1986	1987	Dr Peter Cashmann
1987	1992	John H Greenwell
1987	1990	Professor John L Goldring
1989	1992	The Hon Peter E Nygh AM
1990	1991	Greta Bird
1990	1991	Dott P Totaro AM
1991	1992	Jim Armitage
1991	1992	Leigh Hall AM
1992	1995	Christopher Sidoti
1992	2002	The Hon John von Doussa AO KC
1980	1997	Stephen Mason
1993	1995	Professor James Lahore
1993	1997	Professor Bettina Cass AO
1993	1997	Professor the Hon Peter Baume AC
1993	1995	Professor Rebecca Bailey-Harris
1993	2003	The Hon Ian Coleman SC
1993	1994	Professor Brent Fisse
1993	1995	Sue Tongue
1993	1994	Professor Hilary Charlesworth AM
1993	1994	Professor Regina Graycar
1993	1994	Professor Jennifer Morgan
1994	1996	Michael Ryland
1995	2000	David Edwards PSM
1996	2002	Dr Kathryn Cronin
1998	2006	The Hon Mark Weinberg AC KC
2000	2004	Ian Davis
2000	2006	Professor Brian Opeskin
2000	2002	Mr Hank Spier
2001	2004	Professor Anne Finlay
2005	2009	Professor Les McCrimmon
2003	2007	The Hon Susan Kiefel AC KC
2006	2012	The Hon Justice Susan Kenny AM
2006	2008	The Hon Robert French AC
2009	2010	Magistrate Anne Goldsborough AM
2010	2011	The Hon Bruce Lander KC
2010	2011	The Hon Arthur Emmett AO KC
2011	2012	Professor Terry Flew
2012	2013	The Hon Susan Ryan AO
2007	2013	The Hon Justice Berna Collier
2012	2013	Professor Jill McKeough
2013	2014	Graeme Innes AM
2013	2014	Professor Barbara McDonald
2013	2015	Professor Lee Godden
2015	2015	Professor Suri Ratnapala
2012	2017	The Hon Justice Nye Perram
2017	2017	Robert Cornall AO
2017	2017	Judge Matthew Myers AM
2018	2019	The Hon Cheryl Edwardes AO
2018	2019	The Hon Michelle May AM KC
2018	2019	Dr Andrew Bickerdike
2017	2019	Geoffrey Sinclair
2017	2019	The Hon John Faulks
2017	2018	Professor Helen Rhoades
2019	2020	The Hon Justice Robert Bromwich
2012	2022	The Hon John Middleton AM KC
2021	2023	The Hon Justice Craig Grierson Colvin
2022	2023	The Hon Justice Stephen Rothmann AM
2024	2025	The Hon Marcia Neave AO
2024	2025	Judge Liesl Kudelka
2024	Present	Tony McAvoy SC
2025	Present	Dr Maeghan Toews

== Inquiries into the ALRC ==
Throughout the history of the ALRC there have been a number of inquiries into its role, constitution and functions. They include:

- 1977-1979 Senate Standing Committee on Legal and Constitutional Affairs inquiry into the processing of law reform proposals.
- 1993-1994 House of Representatives Standing Committee on Legal and Constitutional Affairs. This was the first review of the commission's performance, structure and overall method of operation.
- 1997-1998 – Possible Improper Interference with a Potential Witness Before the Parliamentary Joint Committee on Native Title and the Aboriginal and Torres Strait Islander Land Fund (73rd Report)
- 2010 – Legal and Constitutional Affairs Committees an Inquiry into the role and governance of the ALRC and the adequacy of its staffing and resources.

== See also ==
- Commonwealth Association of Law Reform Agencies
- Drug Law Reform Australia
- New South Wales Law Reform Commission
- Law Reform Commission of Western Australia
