= David Yates (judge) =

Australian judge

David Markey Yates is an Australian judge. He has been a Judge of the Federal Court of Australia since 30 November 2009. Prior to his appointment, Justice Yates practised as a Senior Counsel in Sydney.

Justice Yates graduated from the University of Sydney with a Bachelor of Laws. Justice Yates graduated in law from the Sydney Law School in 1977. In that year, he undertook his practical legal training at the College of Law, St Leonards and commenced practice as a solicitor with Sly & Russell in Sydney. He was appointed as an Associate Partner in 1980. Justice Yates became a barrister in 1982, becoming Senior Counsel in 1997. While at the bar, Justice Yates worked actively in intellectual property, being a member of the Intellectual Property Committee of the Law Council of Australia, heading the Intellectual Property Section of the New South Wales Bar Association, and being a member of the New South Wales Committee of the Intellectual Property Society of Australia and New Zealand.

In 2016, Justice Yates was appointed as a Deputy President of the Australian Competition Tribunal.

== See also ==
- List of Judges of the Federal Court of Australia
