= Melissa Perry (judge) =

Australian judge

The Honourable Justice Melissa Anne Perry

Judge of the Federal Court of Australia
- Incumbent
- Assumed office 23 September 2013

Personal details
- Born: Adelaide
- Education: University of Adelaide; University of Cambridge

Melissa Anne Perry is a Judge of the Federal Court of Australia.

== Early life and education ==
Perry attended Walford Anglican School for Girls. Perry then graduated from the University of Adelaide with a Bachelor of Laws with first class Honours. Perry studied at the University of Cambridge where she was awarded an LLM and PhD in public international law. Her doctorate on State succession, boundaries and territorial regimes was awarded the Yorke Prize.

== Career ==
Perry practised at the Bar in Australia from 1992 to 2013, and was appointed Queen's Counsel for South Australia in 2004. Perry was called to the Bar in England and Wales in 2012.

Perry was appointed as a Judge of the Federal Court of Australia on 23 September 201. and as a Deputy President of the Administrative Appeals Tribunal on 20 July 2018. On 11 October 2018, her Honour was commissioned in the office of member of the Defence Force Discipline Appeal Tribunal and was appointed as Vice President of that Tribunal on 1 August 2023. Her Honour was an additional judge of the Supreme Court of the Australian Capital Territory from 2014 to 2023.

Perry is a Foundation Fellow and former Director of the Australian Academy of Law, and is also the Patron for the NSW Chapter of the Hellenic Australian Lawyers Association.

== Publications ==
- "The Duality of Water: Conflict or Co-operation" (2018 Annual Kirby Lecture on International Law, Australian National University College of Law, Centre for International and Public Law) (to be published in Volume 36, Australian Year Book of International Law at p. 3-27 (forthcoming))
- Melissa Perry and Stephen Lloyd (eds), Australian Native Title Law (2018, 2nd ed, Lawbook Co)
- Melissa Perry, "iDecide: Administrative Decision-Making in the Digital World" (2017) 91 Australian Law Journal 29
- "The High Court and Dynamic Federalism" in Kildea, Lynch & Williams (eds), Tomorrow’s Federation; Reforming Australian Government (2012)
- "Native Title" in Freckelton and Selby (eds), Appealing to the Future: Michael Kirby and his Legacy (2009)
- Melissa Perry and Stephen Lloyd, Australian Native Title Law (2003, 1st ed, Lawbook Co)
- "Chapter III and the Powers of Non-Judicial Tribunals" in Stone and Williams (eds), The High Court at the Crossroads (2000, Federation Press)

== See also ==
- List of Judges of the Federal Court of Australia
