= Peter Gray (Australian judge) =

Australian judge

The Honourable Peter Ross Awdry Gray AM

Judge of the Federal Court of Australia
- In office 17 May 1984 – 17 May 2013

Peter Ross Awdry Gray AM joined the Bar in Gray's Inn, London, in 1972 he joined the Victorian Bar and then became a judge of the Federal Court of Australia serving from 17 May 1984 until 17 May 2013.

Gray was the youngest person ever appointed to the Federal Court of Australia and at 29 years its longest ever serving member. During his time at the court Gray delivered over 1,700 decisions. His main focus was on labour law and its impact on Aboriginal Australians.

After retirement Gray was for a time an adjunct professor at Deakin University and is now an Honorary Professor at Monash University. He was appointed a Member of the Order of Australia in the 2014 Australia Day Honours.

== Judiciary ==
Gray held the following roles in the Judiciary:

- Judge of the Federal Court of Australia,
- Judge of the Industrial Relations Court of Australia,
- Presidential Member of the Administrative Appeals Tribunal,
- Deputy President of the National Native Title Tribunal,
- Aboriginal Land Commissioner
