= Michael Moore (Australian judge) =

Australian judge

Hon Michael Francis Moore

Judge of the Federal Court of Australia
- In office 28 March 1994 – 1 August 2011

Michael Francis Moore is a former judge who served on the Federal Court of Australia. He was also a judge of the Court of Appeal of Tonga.
