= James Allsop =

Australian judge and former Chief Justice of the Federal Court of Australia

The Honourable James Allsop AC
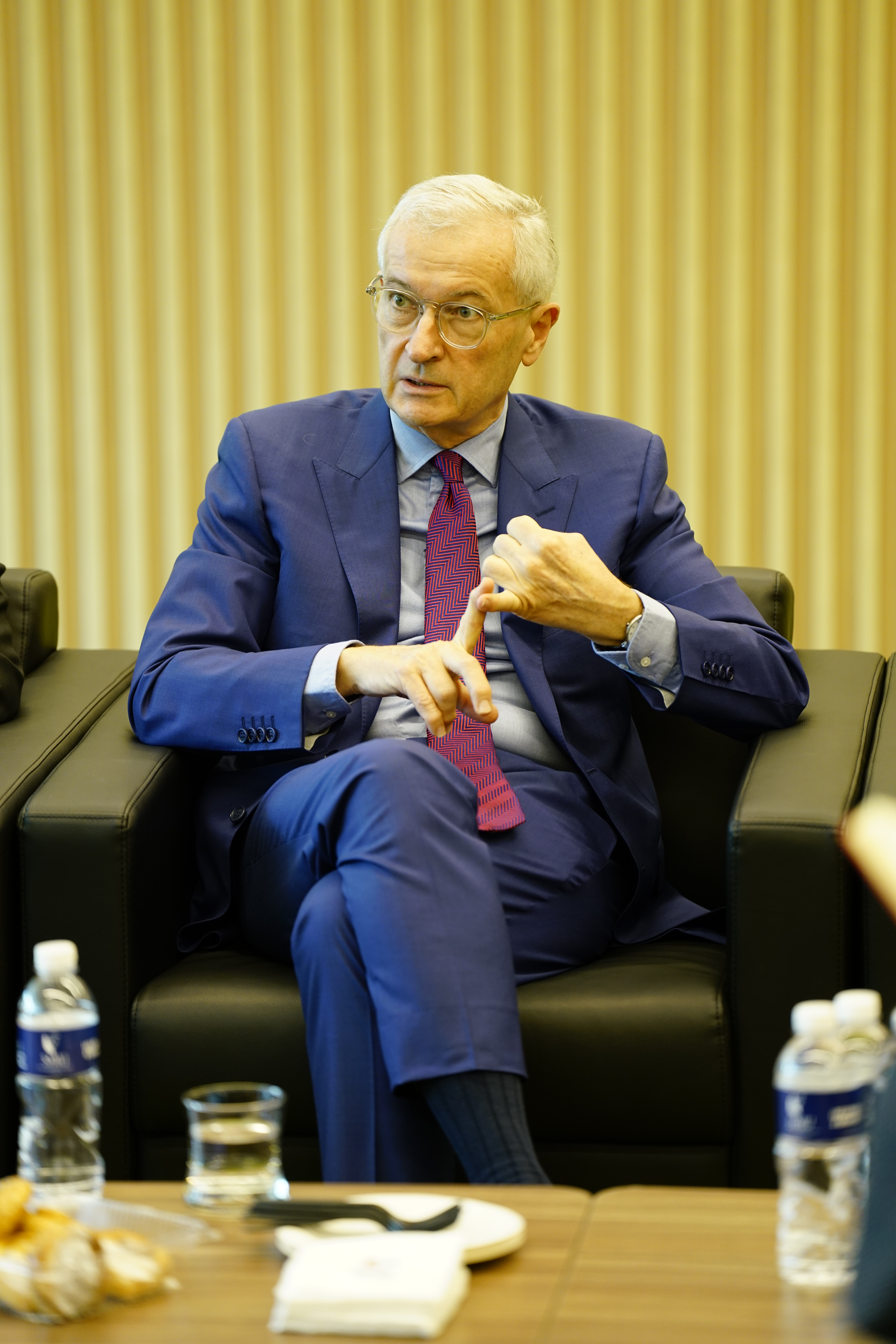

Chief Justice of the Federal Court of Australia
- In office 1 March 2013 – 6 April 2023
- Appointed by: Dame Quentin Bryce
- Preceded by: Patrick Keane
- Succeeded by: Debra Mortimer

President of the New South Wales Court of Appeal
- In office 1 June 2008 – 28 February 2013
- Preceded by: Keith Mason
- Succeeded by: Margaret Beazley

Personal details
- Born: 7 April 1953 (age 73) Sydney
- Education: University of Sydney

James Leslie Bain Allsop AC (born 7 April 1953) is a lawyer, arbitrator and former Australian judge. He currently serves as a Non-Permanent Judge of the Hong Kong Court of Final Appeal and in 2024, he was appointed as an International Judge to the Singapore International Commercial Court.

Alsop was the Chief Justice of the Federal Court of Australia, in office from 1 March 2013 to 6 April 2023. Prior to that, he served as President of the New South Wales Court of Appeal from 2 June 2008 to 28 February 2013. And before his Court of Appeal service he had been a pusine justice of the Federal

As a non-permanent judge of the Court of Final Appeal, Allsop uses the official Chinese name of Au Zung-leot (Chinese: 歐頌律; Jyutping: au1 zung6 leot6).

== Education ==
Allsop attended Sydney Grammar School and completed year 12 in 1970. Allsop then graduated from the University of Sydney with a Bachelor of Arts in 1974 and a Bachelor of Laws in 1980. He won the University Medal in law.

== Career ==
Allsop was admitted to the New South Wales Bar in 1981, and was appointed Senior Counsel in 1994. He was appointed Queen's Counsel in Western Australia in 1998.

From 2001 to 2008, Allsop was a Justice of the Federal Court of Australia. He has also served as an additional Justice of the Supreme Court of the Australian Capital Territory (2003–08). Allsop was appointed the President of the New South Wales Court of Appeal on 2 June 2008.

On 20 November 2012, Commonwealth Attorney-General Nicola Roxon announced Allsop would be appointed Chief Justice of the Federal Court of Australia. In January 2022, he presided over the application for judicial review regarding the visa status of Novak Djokovic on the Full Bench of the Federal Court of Australia. In March 2022 he presided over the Court's ruling that the Commonwealth Minister for the Environment has no duty of care to protect children from the impacts of climate change when considering fossil fuel projects, a ruling that was characterised as undoing "20 years of climate litigation progress in Australia" and demonstrating the "yawning crevasse between the facts in the real world and Australian "environmental" law".

He was succeeded as Chief Justice from 7 April 2023 by Justice Debra Mortimer, who had been a judge of the court.

After being appointed as a Non-Permanent Judge to the Hong Kong Court of Final Appeal in March 2024, he remains in the position as of July 2025, along with other Australian judges Patrick Keane and William Gummow, after British judge Jonathan Sumption resigned, criticising the judiciary of Hong Kong after 14 prominent democratic activists were convicted for subversion.

== Other activities ==
As of 2023, Allsop is also an adjunct professor at the University of Sydney, where he specialises in international admiralty and maritime law.

In April 2024, Allsop gave the keynote speech at the Fifth Full Meeting of the Standing International Forum of Commercial Courts.

== Honours ==
Allsop was appointed an Officer of the Order of Australia (AO) in 2013 for distinguished service to the judiciary and the law, as a judge, through reforms to equity and access, and through contributions to the administration of maritime law and legal education. He was promoted to Companion of the Order of Australia (AC) in the 2023 Australia Day Honours for "eminent service to the judiciary and to the law, to organisational and technological reform, to legal education, and to insolvency law".

== See also ==
- List of Judges of the Federal Court of Australia

Legal offices
Preceded by Keith Mason	President of the New South Wales Court of Appeal; 2008–2013	Succeeded by Margaret Beazley
Preceded by Patrick Keane	Chief Justice of the Federal Court of Australia; 2013–2023	Succeeded by Debra Mortimer
