= Rodney Madgwick =

Australian judge

Rodney Neville Madgwick KC is a former Australian judge who served as a judge of the Federal Court of Australia from 3 October 1995 to 21 April 2008. He was based in the Sydney registry of the court. He attended Sydney Boys High School from 1954 to 1958. He was President of the Australian Society of Labor Lawyers and the New South Wales Society of Labor Lawyers in 1981.
