= John Mansfield (judge) =

Australian judge

The Honourable John Mansfield AM KC

Judge of the Federal Court of Australia
- In office 2 September 1996 – 24 August 2016

Justice of the Supreme Court of the Northern Territory
- In office June 2009 – 2016

Personal details
- Born: John Ronald Mansfield; 25 August 1946 (age 79)
- Children: 4
- Education: Saint Ignatius' College, Adelaide
- Alma mater: University of Adelaide
- Occupation: Judge
- Profession: Lawyer
- Known for: Native Title law

John Ronald Mansfield AM KC is an Australian jurist and former Justice of the Federal Court of Australia. He served from 1996 to 2016 and sat in the court's South Australian registry.

Mansfield was educated at Saint Ignatius' College, Adelaide before graduating from the University of Adelaide with Honours in Law. He was admitted as a practitioner in 1969 and later appointed Queen's Counsel for South Australia in 1985 and for the Northern Territory in 1988. He was appointed to the Federal Court of Australia in September 1996.

Mansfield has served as President of the South Australian Law Society in 1988–89, President of the Law Council of Australia from 1993 to 1994 and Chairman of the Legal Aid Committee for the Law Council of Australia from 1986 to 1994. Additionally, Justice Mansfield is the Chair of the Art Gallery of South Australia Foundation, a position he has held since 2003.

In the 2009 Queen's Birthday Honours Mansfield was appointed as Member of the Order of Australia For service to the law and to the judiciary, to a range of professional associations, and to the arts community of South Australia. On 1 June 2009, Justice Mansfield was appointed as an additional Justice of the Supreme Court of the Northern Territory. He was awarded an honorary doctorate from the University of South Australia on 16 August 2017.
