= Lindsay Foster =

Australian judge (1951–2021)

Lindsay Graeme Foster (1951 – 21 November 2021) was an Australian judge. He served as a Judge of the Federal Court of Australia from 4 September 2008 to 30 September 2020.

Foster studied at the University of Sydney and was admitted to practice by the Supreme Court of New South Wales in 1976. He practiced as a solicitor until his admission to the bar in 1981, and was appointed Senior Counsel in 1994. He continued to work as a barrister until his appointment to the Federal Court in September 2008, when he filled one of three open vacancies.

== See also ==
- List of Judges of the Federal Court of Australia
