= Shane Marshall =

Australian judge

The Honourable Shane Raymond Marshall AM was an Australian judge. He served on the Federal Court of Australia and the Industrial Relations Court of Australia from July 1995 until November 2015. He also held office as an acting Judge of the Supreme Court of Tasmania between January 2017 and September 2025. Marshall served as an additional non resident judge of the Supreme Court of the Australian Caipital Territory from 2004 until 2013 and on the Supreme Court of Nauru (for refugee appeals) from 2017 until 2021.He also served part time on a range of administrative and disciplinary tribunals including as one of the inaugural Deputy Chairpersons of the Victorian Racing Tribunal from 2019 until 2024.

Marshall graduated with degrees in Economics (1977) and Law (Hons) (1979) from Monash University.On 13 November 2024 he received the distinguished Alumni Award for Monash University's Law Faculty for 2024.

Marshall passed away on 5 August 2026.
