= Malcolm Lee (judge) =

Australian judge

The Honourable Malcolm Cameron Lee KC

Judge of the Federal Court of Australia
- In office 15 February 1988 – 1 May 2006

Malcolm Cameron Lee KC is a former judge that served on the Federal Court of Australia. He was based in Perth, Western Australia.

Lee was educated at the University of Western Australia. He was admitted to the Supreme Court of Western Australia in 1964, and began working as a barrister in 1969. He became Queen's Counsel in 1984. He was President of the Western Australian Bar Association from 1978 to 1981, and was a member of the Barristers Board of Western Australia from 1984. He was appointed a member of the Law Reform Commission of Western Australia in May 1987. He was a judge of the Industrial Relations Court of Australia.

In 1998 Lee ruled in recognition of the native title of the Miriuwung and Gajerrong people of the east Kimberly, over land in Western Australia and the Northern Territory.

In 2011 Lee returned to the bench to hear the Bell Group Appeal in Western Australia's Supreme Court of Appeal.
