= Supreme Court of the Australian Capital Territory =

Superior court of the Australian Capital Territory, Australia

- Arms of the City of Canberra, as used by the court

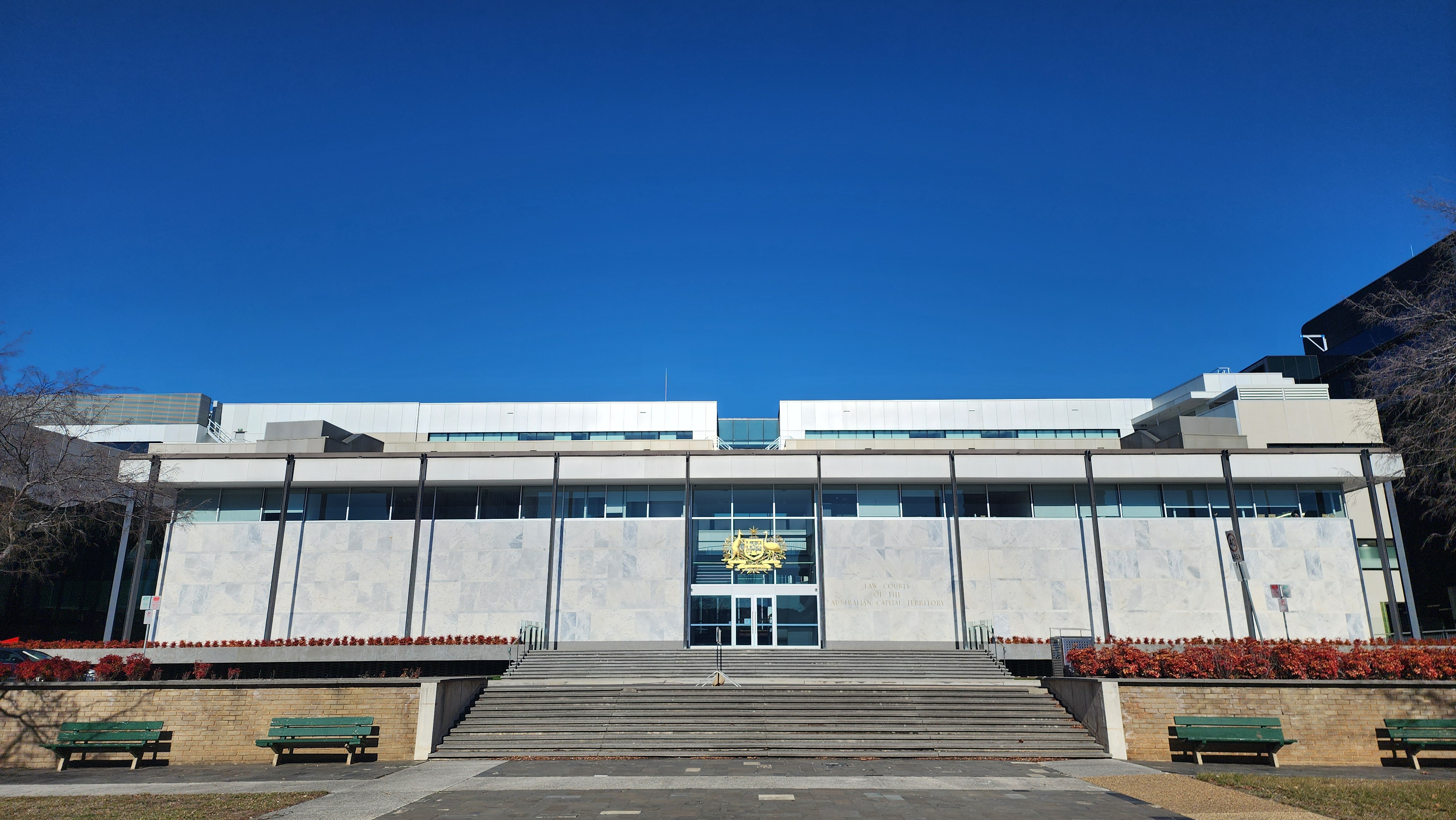
- ACT Law Courts building
- Interactive map of Supreme Court of the Australian Capital Territory
- 35.281015°S 149.127245°E
- Established: 1 January 1934
- Jurisdiction: Australian Capital Territory
- Location: London Circuit at Canberra
- Coordinates: 35.281015°S 149.127245°E
- Composition method: Executive appointment following advice of the Attorney-General
- Authorised by: ACT (Self-Government) Act 1988 (Cth); Supreme Court Act 1933 (ACT)
- Appeals to: High Court of Australia
- Appeals from: Magistrates Court of the ACT
- Judge term length: Mandatory retirement by age of 70
- Number of positions: 5
- Website: www.courts.act.gov.au/supreme

Chief Justice of the Australian Capital Territory
- Currently: Lucy McCallum
- Since: 8 March 2022

The Supreme Court of the Australian Capital Territory is the highest court of the Australian Capital Territory (ACT). It has unlimited jurisdiction within the territory in civil matters and hears the most serious criminal cases.

The court has the jurisdictional power to hear matters that relate to the Jervis Bay Territory, the Australian Antarctic Territory and the Heard Island and McDonald Islands, although it has never heard a case exercising its power over the Heard and McDonald Islands. It also hears matters on appeal from the Magistrates Court of the Australian Capital Territory.

Whilst the Supreme Court is the highest Australian Capital Territory court in the Australian court hierarchy, an appeal by special leave can be made to the High Court of Australia. Matters of appeal can also be submitted to the ACT Court of Appeal, which is constituted by members of the Supreme Court.

The Supreme Court consists of 5 permanent judges, including the chief justice of the Australian Capital Territory (as of 2022, Lucy McCallum), 1 associate judge, 11 additional judges and 4 acting judges. The court has three main administrative units: Registry, Sheriff's Office and the Russell Fox Library.

The court is located on Knowles Place near London Circuit at Civic, in Canberra, in the new ACT Law Courts building that it shares with the Magistrates Court.

== History ==
When the Federal Capital Territory was created in 1911, all existing laws applicable in New South Wales applied equally to the new Territory. The Commonwealth soon began the implementation of a series of ordinances for the Territory's governance.

In the early years, Territory justice was enacted through the provisions of the Seat of Government Acceptance Act 1909. Territory officials relied on the Queanbeyan, Goulburn and Cooma courts. On 12 December 1925, the Federal Capital Commission wrote to the Department of Home Affairs and Territories about developing a system for the administration of justice in the Territory. It would be another five years, however, before any decisive action was taken, with the establishment of a Court of Petty Sessions in 1930.

In November 1932, Cabinet considered a report dealing with contemporary arrangements involving Territory courts. The report noted the High Court and Court of Petty Sessions, and that there had been a recent trial use of a visiting judge to hear criminal and civil matters. What was needed, the report said, was for the Territory to have its own Supreme Court. This would relieve the High Court of its jurisdiction in respect of the Territory and provide an intermediate court of appeal between the High Court and Court of Petty Sessions. Cabinet approved the recommendation on 7 December 1932.

The Supreme Court of the Federal Capital Territory was established on 1 January 1934 by the Seat of Government Supreme Court Act 1933 (Cth).

The first judge of the Supreme Court was Lionel Lukin, who served from 1934 to 1943, and the court's first sitting was on 12 February 1934 at Acton House (the building was demolished in 1940). The court moved to the Hotel Acton in early 1935, then to the new Patent Office in Barton in 1941, and then to the Law Courts Building on the western side of City Hill, on 8 May 1963.

From its creation in 1976 until 2002, appeals from the Supreme Court were heard by a full bench of the Federal Court of Australia. The judges of the Supreme Court were usually also Federal Court judges and it was "the usual practice" that at least one sit on appeals to that court.

Following the establishment of self-government in 1989, the court remained under Commonwealth administration until its transfer to the ACT Government on 1 July 1992, when the ACT Supreme Court (Transfer) Act 1992 (Cth) came into effect.

By 2006, the Supreme Court comprised a Chief Justice, three resident judges and (since 1958) additional judges otherwise appointed to the Federal Court of Australia as well as a Master of the Court.

In 2015, the title of the office of Master of the Supreme Court was changed to Associate Judge.

It was announced in 2017 that the ACT Law Courts building would be expanded as the Supreme Court was experience capacity issues. In 2019, stage one of the renovations were completed. Not only did the renovations bring the Magistrates Court and the Supreme Court into the same building, it added several new courtrooms and modernised facilities. Stage two and the renovations of the original ACT Law Courts building is due to be completed in coming years.

== Jurisdiction ==
The court has "all original and appellate jurisdiction that is necessary for the administration of justice in the Territory", including both civil and criminal jurisdiction. It also covers matters relating to corporation law, adoptions and probate. The court also conducted divorce proceedings, but only until 1975, when the Family Court of Australia assumed responsibility for this function.

In addition to possessing jurisdictional power with respect to matters in the Australian Capital Territory, the Court also has the jurisdictional power to hear matters that relate to the Jervis Bay Territory, the Australian Antarctic Territory and the Heard Island and McDonald Islands, although it has never exercised that power. It also hears matters on appeal from the Magistrates Court of the Australian Capital Territory.

== Composition ==
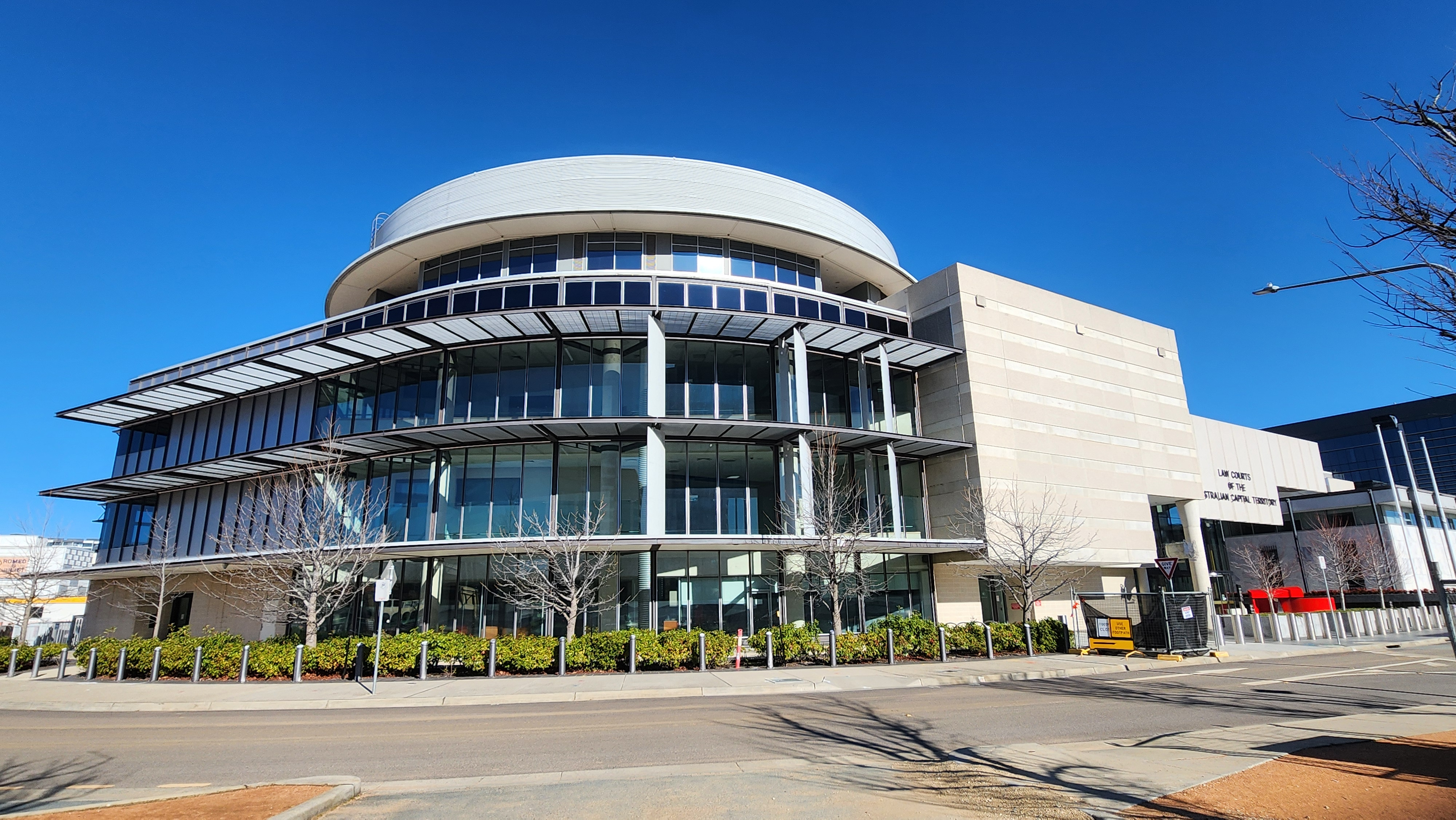
Magistrates Court of the Australian Capital Territory

The court consists of a Chief Justice, six resident judges, and a number of acting and additional judges. The Supreme Court Act also provides for the appointment of an Associate Judge (previously called the Master), though this position has been vacant since its most recent holder, Verity McWilliam, was elevated to the bench in 2023.

From 2007 until 2015, there was also a President of the Court of Appeal. The position was left vacant after its only holder, Justice Malcolm Gray, retired in 2011 and was formally abolished in 2015 due to "the existing overlap with the functions of the Chief Justice".

All judges are appointed by the Territory government. Additional judges are judges of other courts, usually the Federal Court, who hold their appointment to the Supreme Court in addition to their other appointments. Acting judges are judges appointed on a temporary basis, for a maximum of one year at a time.

The court can be constituted by a single judge alone or with a jury. An appeal from the associate judge or from a single judge is heard by the court sitting as the ACT Court of Appeal constituted by three judges. An appeal from the Magistrates Court of the Australian Capital Territory is heard by a single judge.

The Chief Justice is responsible for the prompt discharge of the court’s business, and may, in consultation with a judge, decide the types of cases which a magistrate will hear.

=== Membership ===
==== Chief Justice ====
Name	Date appointed	Term in office	Notes
Chief Justice Lucy McCallum	8 March 2022	4 years, 131 days	

==== Judges ====
Name	Date appointed	Term in office	Notes
Justice David Mossop	13 February 2017	9 years, 154 days	
Justice Chrissa Loukas-Karlsson	6 February 2018	8 years, 161 days	
Justice Belinda Baker	25 November 2022	3 years, 234 days	
Justice Verity McWilliam	2 May 2023	3 years, 76 days	
Justice Louise Taylor	16 August 2023	2 years, 335 days	

==== Associate Judge ====
Name	Date appointed	Term in office	Notes
vacant	—	—	

=== Additional Judges ===
Name	Date appointed	Term in office	Notes
Steven Rares	March 2007	18–19 years	
Anthony Besanko	March 2007	18–19 years	
Lindsay Foster	11 November 2009	16 years, 248 days	
Jayne Jagot	11 November 2009	16 years, 248 days	
Anna Katzmann	17 September 2010	15 years, 303 days	
John Gilmour	6 July 2012	14 years, 11 days	
Michael Wigney	9 December 2013	12 years, 220 days	
Melissa Perry	14 May 2014	12 years, 64 days	
Berna Collier	3 May 2016	10 years, 75 days	
Robert Bromwich	5 September 2016	9 years, 315 days	
Natalie Charlesworth	14 November 2017	8 years, 245 days	

=== Acting Judges ===
Name	Date appointed	Term in office	Notes
Linda Ashford	1 July 2014	12 years, 16 days	
Stephen Walmsley	1 July 2014	12 years, 16 days	
David Robinson	1 July 2014	12 years, 16 days	
Murray Kellam	8 March 2017	9 years, 131 days	

== Process ==
Civil matters may be commenced by the filing of an originating application or originating process.

Criminal matters are commenced when they persons are committed to trial or sentence by the Magistrates Court of the Australian Capital Territory.

Appeals to the court may come from several sources including the Magistrates Court and the ACT Civil and Administrative Tribunal.

== See also ==
- List of Judges of the Supreme Court of the Australian Capital Territory
