= Federal Court of Australia =

Australian superior federal court

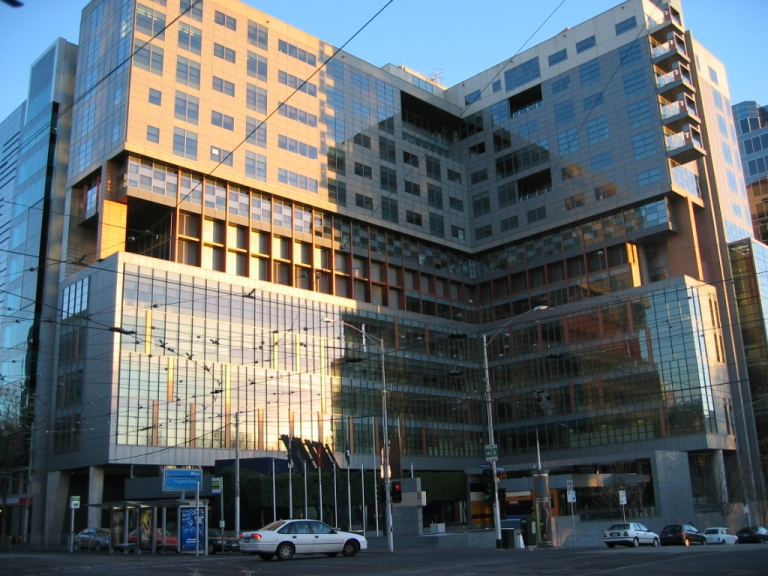
- In Melbourne, the Federal Court is housed with other federal courts such as the High Court and the Federal Circuit Court of Australia in the Owen Dixon Commonwealth Law Courts Building on the corner of La Trobe Street and William Street
- Interactive map of Federal Court of Australia
- 33°52′8″S 151°12′42″E
- Established: 1976
- Jurisdiction: Australia
- Coordinates: 33°52′8″S 151°12′42″E
- Authorised by: Federal Court of Australia Act 1976 (Cth)
- Appeals to: High Court of Australia
- Website: www.fedcourt.gov.au

Chief Justice
- Currently: Debra Mortimer
- Since: 7 April 2023

The Federal Court of Australia is an Australian superior court which has jurisdiction to deal with most civil disputes governed by federal law (with the exception of family law matters), along with some summary (less serious) and indictable (more serious) criminal matters. Cases are heard at first instance mostly by single judges. In cases of importance, a full court comprising three judges can be convened upon determination by the Chief Justice. The Court also has appellate jurisdiction, which is mostly exercised by a Full Court comprising three judges (although sometimes by a panel of five judges and sometimes by a single judge), the only avenue of appeal from which lies to the High Court of Australia. In the Australian court hierarchy, the Federal Court occupies a position equivalent to the supreme courts of each of the states and territories. In relation to the other courts in the federal stream, it is superior to the Federal Circuit and Family Court of Australia for all jurisdictions except family law. It was established in 1976 by the Federal Court of Australia Act.

The Chief Justice of the Federal Court is Debra Mortimer.

== Jurisdiction ==
The Federal Court has no constitutional jurisdiction; its jurisdiction is provided by statute. The Court's original jurisdiction include matters arising from Commonwealth legislation such as, for example, matters relating to taxation, trade practices, native title, intellectual property, industrial relations, corporations, immigration and bankruptcy.

The Federal Court of Australia also has appellate jurisdiction from Division 2 of the Federal Circuit and Family Court of Australia on all general federal law matters (family law matters are appealed to Division 1 of that Court). The Court also exercises general appellate jurisdiction in criminal and civil matters on appeal from the Supreme Court of Norfolk Island; and exercises appellate jurisdiction in appeals from state supreme courts in some federal matters. Other federal courts and tribunals where the Court exercises appellate jurisdiction include the Australian Sports Anti-Doping Authority and the Australian Human Rights and Equal Opportunity Commission.

The Court has concurrent jurisdiction with the Australian Capital Territory Supreme Court and Northern Territory Supreme Court over civil matters arising under those Territories' laws.

== Related courts ==
The jurisdiction of the Federal Court of Australia includes the jurisdiction previously exercised by three former federal courts, the Federal Court of Bankruptcy, Commonwealth Industrial Court and Industrial Relations Court of Australia.

=== Federal Court of Bankruptcy ===
The Federal Court of Bankruptcy had jurisdiction in bankruptcy matters and was created in 1930. The jurisdiction in bankruptcy was transferred to the Federal Court of Australia on its establishment in 1977.

=== Commonwealth Industrial Court ===
The Commonwealth Industrial Court was established in 1956 as a result of the Boilermaker's case, where the High Court held that a Chapter III Court could not exercise a non-judicial power, the arbitral function, because of the constitutional separation of powers in Australia. The judicial functions were given to the newly created Commonwealth Industrial Court and the arbitral functions were given to Commonwealth Conciliation and Arbitration Commission.

The court was renamed the Australian Industrial Court in 1973. In 1977 the jurisdiction of the Australian Industrial Court was transferred to the Federal Court of Australia.

=== Industrial Relations Court of Australia ===
In 1993 the industrial relations jurisdiction of the Federal Court of Australia was transferred to the Industrial Relations Court of Australia, and transferred back to the Federal Court of Australia in 1996. The last judge of the Industrial Relations Court, Anthony North, retired in September 2018. The court was formally abolished on 1 March 2021.

== Current judges ==
Sydney

- Nye Perram (8 August 2008)
- Michael Wigney (9 September 2013)
- Melissa Perry (23 September 2013)
- Brigitte Markovic (24 August 2015)
- Robert Bromwich (29 February 2016)
- Stephen Burley (23 May 2016)
- Michael Lee (23 April 2017)
- Thomas Thawley (14 February 2018)
- Angus Stewart (25 February 2019)
- Wendy Abraham (7 May 2019)
- John Halley (19 March 2021)
- Elizabeth Cheeseman (12 April 2021)
- Scott Goodman (11 November 2021)
- Elizabeth Raper (2 May 2022)
- Geoffrey Kennett (19 December 2022)
- Ian Jackman (6 February 2023)
- Adam Hatcher (19 February 2023)
- Yaseen Shariff (7 September 2023)
- Jane Needham (5 July 2024)
- Cameron Moore (18 December 2024)
- Nicholas Owens (18 December 2024)
- James Stellios (19 December 2024)
- Houda Younan (19 December 2024)
- Craig Lenahan (9 February 2026)

Melbourne

- Mordecai Bromberg (7 December 2009)
- Debra Mortimer (12 July 2013) (Chief Justice)
- Jonathan Beach (30 June 2014)
- Mark Moshinsky (3 November 2015)
- David O'Callaghan (1 February 2017)
- Michael Wheelahan (3 October 2018)
- Michael O’Bryan (26 February 2019)
- John Snaden (29 April 2019)
- Stewart Anderson (6 May 2019)
- Helen Rofe (12 July 2021)
- Timothy McEvoy (26 April 2022)
- Lisa Hespe (27 April 2022)
- Catherine Button (16 January 2023)
- Emilios Kyrou (8 June 2023)
- Christopher Horan (5 September 2023)
- Penelope Neskovcin (8 February 2024)
- Craig Dowling (9 February 2024)
- Elizabeth Bennett (20 December 2024)
- Graeme Hill (2 April 2025)

Brisbane

- Berna Collier (8 February 2006)
- Darryl Rangiah (13 August 2013)
- Roger Derrington (24 April 2017)
- Sarah Derrington (10 January 2018)
- Kylie Downes (2 August 2021)
- Fiona Meagher (31 March 2022)
- Erin Longbottom (20 December 2024)
- Amelia Wheatley (6 January 2025)

Perth

- Katrina Banks-Smith (12 February 2018)
- Craig Colvin (13 February 2018)
- Darren Jackson (20 March 2019)
- Michael Feutrill (8 March 2022)
- Samuel Vandongen (17 December 2024)

Adelaide

- Natalie Charlesworth (1 March 2016)
- Patrick O'Sullivan (20 January 2022)
- Stephen Andrew McDonald (8 July 2024)

Hobart

- Shaun McElwaine (24 January 2022)

== See also ==
- Commonwealth Law Courts
- Law Courts Building, Sydney
- List of judges of the Federal Court of Australia
- List of Federal Court of Australia cases
