= WaterSecure =

Water company in Queensland

- Queensland Manufactured Water Authority

Statutory authority overview
- Jurisdiction: South East Queensland
- Headquarters: Level 2, 95 North Quay, Brisbane, Queensland, Australia
- Motto: A new source of pure water
- Statutory authority executive: CEO
- Parent department: Department of Energy and Water Supply
- Key document: South East Queensland Water (Restructuring) Act 2007 (QLD)

WaterSecure, the trading name of the Queensland Manufactured Water Authority, was a statutory authority of the Government of Queensland that supplied water to the South East Queensland region of Australia through its desalination plant and a water recycling scheme, the Western Corridor Recycled Water scheme. WaterSecure was merged with Seqwater on 1 July 2011.

== Function and activities ==
The Gold Coast Desalination Plant was the first large-scale desalination plant on Australia's eastern seaboard. The plant has the capacity to supply up to 125 megalitres a day of drinking water (45 GL/year).

The Western Corridor Recycled Water scheme provides purified water to Swanbank Power Station and Tarong Power Station with the capacity to supply industry and agriculture.

== See also ==
- Queensland Water Commission
- Seawater desalination in Australia
- Water security in Australia
- Water supply and sanitation in Australia
