= SEQ Water Grid Manager =

Former agency overseeing the operation of South East Queensland Water Grid

Statutory authority overview
- Formed: 1 July 2008
- Dissolved: 31 December 2012
- Superseding Statutory authority: Seqwater
- Jurisdiction: South East Queensland, Australia
- Parent department: Department of Energy and Water Supply
- Key document: South East Queensland Water (Restructuring) Act 2007 (QLD)

The SEQ Water Grid Manager, a former statutory authority of the Government of Queensland, was in operation between 2008 and 2012. During this period, the agency was responsible for managing the strategic operation of the SEQ Water Grid, including issues such as water security and water quality for the region.

== Activities and functions ==
The agency was created in the 2006 water grid plan.

Whilst in operation, the SEQ Water Grid Manager purchased the services to store, treat, produce and transport bulk water from Seqwater and LinkWater to sell to SEQ Water Grid customers – council-owned, businesses and power stations.

To manage the operations of the SEQ Water Grid and maintain water security, it made daily decisions about water demand; and based on those projections supplies treated water to the SEQ Water Grid to meet the needs of communities and businesses. The SEQ Water Grid Manager was also responsible for ensuring safe, secure and efficient water is delivered to SEQ Water Grid customers; managing the SEQ Water Grid's debt profile; implementing a whole-of-Grid risk management framework; and implementing whole-of-Grid improvement projects.

Seqwater assumed the function of the SEQ Water Grid Manager on 1 January 2013.

== See also ==
- Queensland Water Commission
- Water supply and sanitation in Australia
- Water security in Australia
