= Queensland Urban Utilities =

Statutory authority in Queensland, Australia

Urban Utilities
- Central SEQ Distributor-Retailer Authority

Agency overview
- Formed: 1 July 2010
- Preceding agencies: Brisbane Water; Ipswich Water
- Jurisdiction: South East Queensland, Australia
- Headquarters: Level 10, 31 Duncan Street, Fortitude Valley, Queensland
- Minister responsible: Ann Leahy MP, Minister for Local Government and Water
- Agency executives: Bronwyn Morris, Chairperson; Paul Arnold, CEO
- Website: urbanutilities.com.au

Urban Utilities (UU) is the trading name of the Central SEQ Distributor-Retailer Authority, a statutory authority of the Government of Queensland that is responsible for the delivery of retail water supply and wastewater services across five local government areas in South East Queensland, in Australia. The shareholders of the statutory authority are the councils of Brisbane, Ipswich, Lockyer Valley, Scenic Rim, and Somerset.

== Function and activities ==
The authority was formed on 1 July 2010 when it assumed the functions of Brisbane Water, a government business enterprise that was owned and managed by the Brisbane City Council, together with the merging of water assets from the four other member local government authorities. At the time, the A$4.3 billion merger was the largest water transaction and second largest infrastructure transaction in Australian history.

UU services over a quarter of Queensland's total population.

Related organisations are Unitywater (Moreton Bay, Sunshine Coast and Noosa), Logan City Council (Logan Water), Redland City Council (Redland Water), and Gold Coast City Council. Allconnex Water supplied Logan, Redland and Gold Coast, until 30 June 2012.

== See also ==
- Queensland Water Commission
- Seqwater
- Water security in Australia
- Water supply and sanitation in Australia
