= Water supply and sanitation in Australia =

Australia: Water and sanitation

Data
- Water coverage (broad definition): 100%
- Sanitation coverage (broad definition): 90%
- Continuity of supply (%): Mostly continuous
- Average residential water use (l/p/d): 191 liter/person/day (2007)
- Average domestic water and sewer bill: A$350/month or US$270/month
- Share of household metering: n/a
- Annual investment in WSS: A$2 bn/US$1.74 bn (2007–08) or US$81/capita
- Share of self-financing by utilities: High
- Share of tax-financing: Low
- Share of external financing: None

Institutions
- Decentralisation to municipalities: In some states (primarily in Queensland and Tasmania)
- National water and sanitation company: State water and sanitation companies
- Water and sanitation regulator: No
- Responsibility for policy setting: Share between states/territories and the Commonwealth (national government)
- Sector law: No
- Number of urban service providers: > 33
- Number of rural service providers: n/a

Water supply and sanitation in Australia is a topic concerning the consumption and obtainment of water for the Australian population. Being the driest inhabited continent in the world, and also one of the highest consumers of water per capita, both the acquisition and usage of water are of concern to Australians. Issues such as climate change and global warming are expected to impact the supply of water in Australia in the future, which can lead to severe consequences such as prolonged droughts.

Historically, Australia's variable rainfall levels have caused the construction of various dams and reservoirs in major water systems, to ensure that a consistent water supply exists for its population. The Murray-Darling river, Australia's largest river by capacity, supplies 55% of the total water usage in Australia, and is primarily used for agriculture in South Australia, New South Wales, and Victoria. Other prominent water sources have included groundwater, desalinated marine water, and recycled water.

The government management of water supply and distribution are a responsibility of each state government. State-owned companies are in charge of service provision in Western Australia, South Australia and the Northern Territory, while utilities owned by local governments provide services in parts of Queensland and Tasmania. In Victoria, New South Wales and Southeast Queensland, state-owned utilities provide bulk water which is then distributed by utilities owned by either local or state governments. The Minister for Water is responsible for water policies at the federal level.

Restrictions on water usage have been implemented at various points in Australia's history, in response to widespread droughts. Policies involve the prohibition of water usage for non-essential purposes, such as sprinklers and car washing. In less urgent times, residents are still encouraged to conserve water and apply practices such as effluent reuse, rainwater harvesting and using greywater for various applicable purposes. Larger scale projects in wastewater reclamation have been discussed in many major cities and successfully applied in Adelaide and Brisbane.

In 2006, Perth became the first Australian city to operate a seawater desalination plant, the Kwinana Desalination Plant, to reduce the city's vulnerability to droughts. Additional plants followed for major cities around Australia, such as

- Kurnell which supplies Sydney metropolitan area during droughts and low dam levels
- Gold Coast Desalination Plant supplying the Gold Coast and additionally the South East Queensland area by the SEQ Water Grid
- Victorian Desalination Plant supplying Melbourne metropolitan area.
- Adelaide Desalination Plant with capacity to supply up to 50% of Adelaide's water requirements.

== Water resources and water use ==
Australia is the driest inhabited continent on Earth, and among the world's highest consumers of water. Amongst OECD nations Australia is ranked fourth-highest in water use per capita. Total water runoff in 2004–05 was estimated at 243 billion cubic meters (BCM) and total groundwater recharge was estimated at 49 BCM, giving a total inflow to Australia's water resources of 292 BCM. Over 50 per cent of runoff occurred in northern Australia. Only 6 per cent of Australia's runoff was in the Murray-Darling Basin, where 50 per cent of Australia's water use occurs. Australia's total large dam storage capacity was 84 BCM. While surface water is well known, groundwater resources are not well known.

In 2004–05 the National Water Commission undertook water balance assessments for 55 priority geographic areas across Australia. Of these water management areas six were overused (consumptive use was greater than sustainable yield) and seventeen had a high level of consumptive use as a proportion of inflows (consumptive use greater than 30 per cent of inflows). Two water management areas (Great Artesian Basin and Mereenie Sandstone – Alice Springs) had consumptive use greater than total annual inflow. Total water use in Australia in 2004–05 was nearly 80 BCM, with about 75 per cent of this water returned to the environment following in-stream uses such as hydroelectric power generation. Consumptive use of water in the Australian economy in 2004–05 was 18.8 BCM (6.4 per cent of resources), with the agriculture sector the largest user (65 per cent), followed by household use (11 per cent). Residential water use declined from 243 liter/person/day in 2003 to 191 in 2007.

According to the Prime Minister's office, as the impact of climate change intensifies, Australia faces increasingly acute long-term water shortages with lower rainfall, rivers drying up and dam water levels falling. In most parts of Australia, surface water stored in reservoirs is the main source for municipal water supply, making water supply vulnerable to droughts; only a much smaller share comes from groundwater. Non-conventional water sources, such as seawater desalination, play an increasing role in Australia's water supply, with one desalination plant commissioned to supply Perth and others being built in Sydney, the Gold Coast, Melbourne, Adelaide, and another is planned to be built at Port Augusta.

The use of reclaimed water – the non-potable reuse of treated wastewater for irrigation of green spaces, golf courses, agricultural crops or industrial uses – is common and increasing in Australia. Among the 20 largest water utilities in Australia, the largest volume of recycled water supplied was by SA Water in Adelaide (25,047 ML or 29.6% of sewage collected), while the lowest volume of recycled water was by ACTEW in Canberra (2,104 ML or 7.4% of sewage collected).

=== Adelaide ===
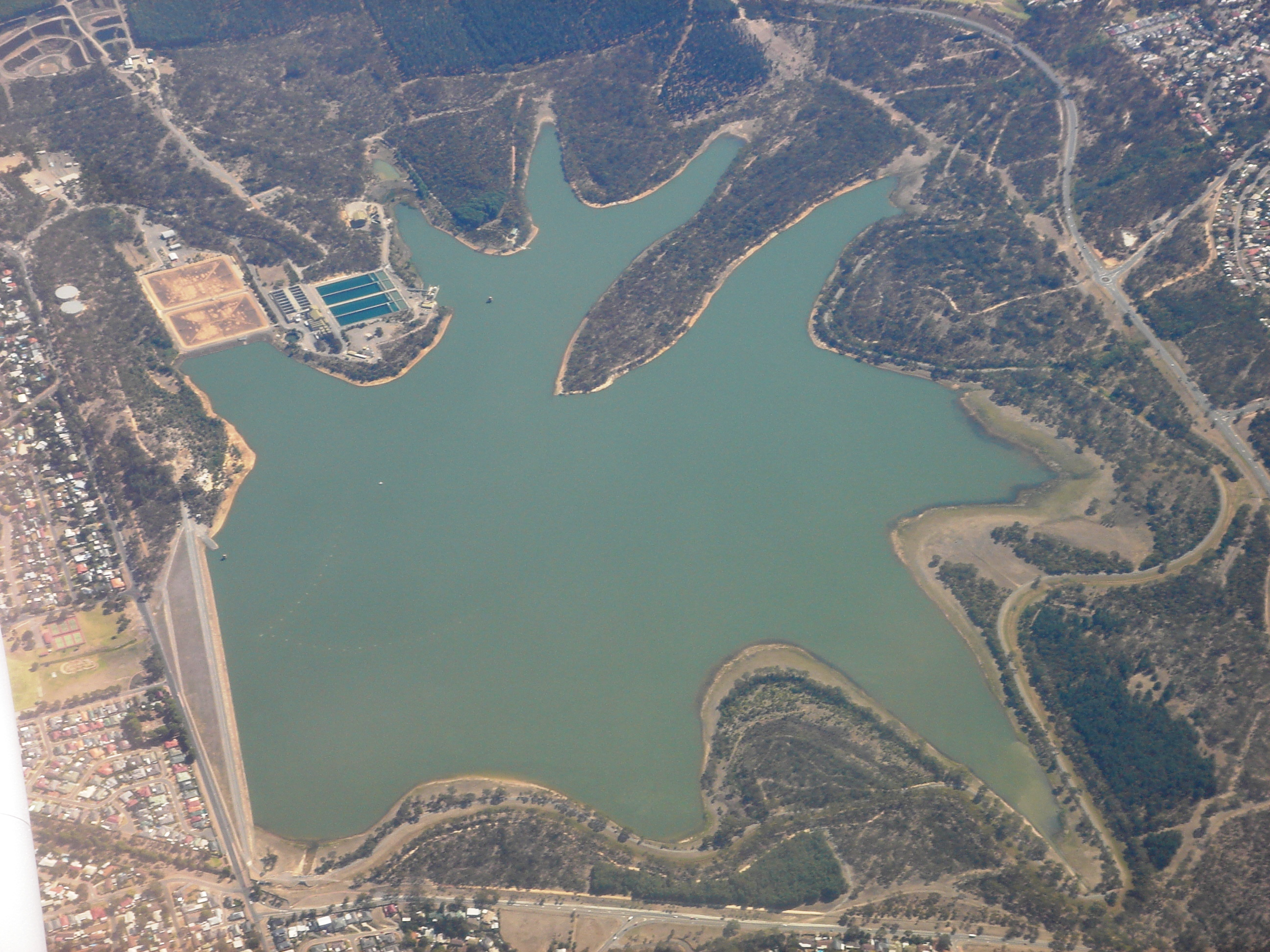
The Happy Valley Reservoir stores water for supply to Adelaide.

Adelaide receives its drinking water from six sources:

- the River Torrens, flowing from the Adelaide Hills through the city into the sea, with storage provided in the Millbrook Reservoir, Kangaroo Creek Reservoir and Hope Valley Reservoir;
- the Onkaparinga River south of Adelaide with storage in the Mount Bold Reservoir, downstream of which water is diverted by the Clarendon Weir via a tunnel to the Happy Valley Reservoir on the Field River;
- The Barossa Reservoir, the Warren Reservoir, South Para Reservoir and the Little Para Reservoir north-east of Adelaide;
- Most years the flow to these reservoirs is supplemented by water pumped from the River Murray through two pipelines, the Mannum–Adelaide pipeline to the reservoirs on the River Torrens, the South Para Reservoir and Warren Reservoir, and the other from Murray Bridge to the reservoirs on the Onkaparinga River;
- The Myponga Reservoir on the Myponga river about 60 km south of Adelaide, supplying about 5% of the city's water supply.
- The Adelaide Desalination Plant with the capacity to supply up to 50% of Adelaide's water needs, but currently only supplying approximately 4%.

The amount of water required from the River Murray varies from about 40 per cent of Adelaide's water needs in a normal rainfall year to as much as 90 per cent in a dry year. At full capacity the above-mentioned reservoirs hold about 200 million cubic meters of water, or a little less than one year's supply for metropolitan Adelaide.

A desalination plant near Port Augusta has been proposed which will supply almost all the residential water needs of towns on the Spencer Gulf.

=== Brisbane and Gold Coast ===
Water storage, treatment and bulk supply for Brisbane is handled by Seqwater, which sells on to Brisbane Water for distribution to the Greater Brisbane area. Water for the area is stored in three major dams; Wivenhoe Dam on the Brisbane River, Somerset on the Stanley River and North Pine on the North Pine River. Water is also provided by a number of smaller dams that are connected via the SEQ Water Grid. The Wivenhoe Dam is shared with the Gold Coast, which has two more water sources, the Hinze Dam and the smaller Little Nerang Dam, both on the Nerang River. Groundwater from North Stradbroke Island is also transferred to the mainland to supplement the area's water supply. Gold Coast Water has constructed a desalination plant at Tugun, commissioned in 2009. A Southern Regional Pipeline is also under construction that will share Gold Coast water with the rest of South East Queensland.

The A$2.5 billion Western Corridor Recycled Water Project whose construction began in 2006 includes the construction of three new wastewater treatment plants, 200 km of pipelines and 12 pumping stations. It will provide reclaimed water to industrial users, agricultural users and to supplement drinking water supplies in Wivenhoe Dam.

A severe drought in 2005–2007 triggered major investments, including the Tugun desalination plant and the Western Corridor Recycled Water Project. When rainfall became abundant in 2008-2010 and reservoirs were full, the state government decided in 2010 to put the Tugun plant in stand-by mode, operating at less than 10% of capacity, and to close down a new advanced wastewater treatment plant on Gibson Island in order to save power and chemicals.

=== Canberra ===
Canberra draws its water supply from three separate catchment systems: The Cotter River catchment, within the ACT; the Googong system on the Queanbeyan River in New South Wales; and the Murrumbidgee River, at the Cotter Pump Station. All these rivers drain into the Murray River which is ultimately part of the Murray-Darling Basin.

=== Melbourne ===
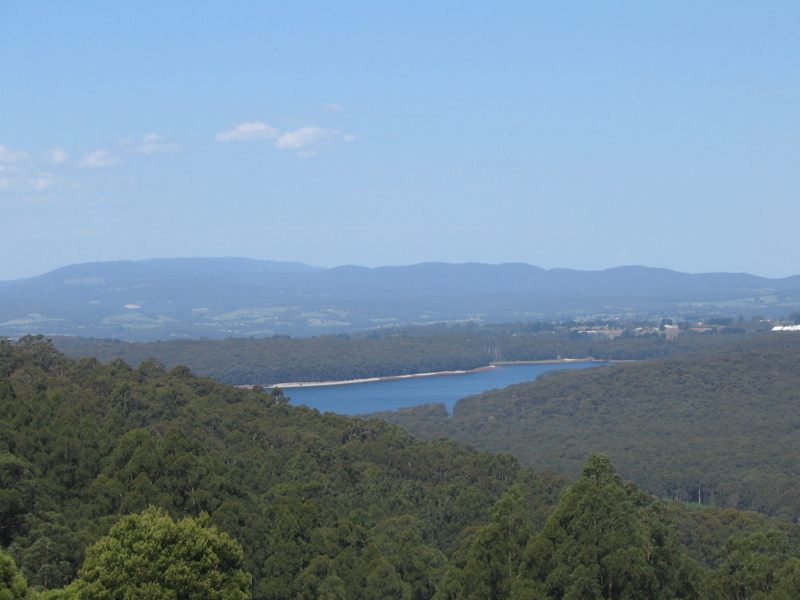
The Silvan reservoir supplies water to Melbourne.

An adequate supply of fresh drinking water and the proper disposal of sewage was an early priority in Melbourne. In 1853, a Commission of Sewers and Water Supply was established to improve the provision of each. The Yarra River above the falls was the main source of drinking water till the completion of the Yan Yean Reservoir. Construction began in December 1853 and was completed on the last day of 1857. The commission was unable to find the money to create a sewer system for Melbourne. As a result, the Yarra below the falls continued for years as a dumping ground for sewerage, offal and other noxious waste.

Some 90% of Melbourne's drinking water comes from uninhabited mountain ash forests high up in the Yarra Ranges east of Melbourne. More than 157,000 hectares has been reserved for the primary purpose of harvesting water. These water supply catchments have been closed to the public for more than 100 years. Melbourne's water supply system is based on the principle that it is better to start with the highest quality source water than having to treat it to reach required standards. According to Melbourne Water, Melbourne is one of only about five cities in the world that has such protected catchments. Water from the forests flows through streams in reservoirs, which provide security of supply for times of drought. One of these reservoirs is formed by the Thomson Dam on the Thomson River located about 130 km east of Melbourne in Gippsland, from where water flows through a 19 km long tunnel through the Great Dividing Range into the Upper Yarra Reservoir and then onto Silvan Reservoir for distribution as drinking water in Melbourne. The millennium drought resulted in depletion of much of the water in the reservoir of the Thomson Dam but as of 2022 it is approaching full capacity.

In June 2007, the Victorian State Government announced a new plan to provide water security for Victoria's growing population and economy by diversifying and boosting water supplies, networking the State's water resources in a Victorian Water Grid and enabling a rapid and flexible response to changing future water needs. The plan includes A$4.9 billion of projects to secure Melbourne and Victoria's water supplies for the long term, including:

- the 150 billion litre per year, A$2.2 billion Melbourne desalination plant in Wonthaggi which would be the largest desalination plant in Australia, supplying 30% of Melbourne's water needs, for which a Build–operate–transfer (BOT) contract was awarded in mid-2009 to a consortium led by the French multinational SUEZ;
- a major irrigation upgrade in the Food Bowl in Northern Victoria to deliver water savings to be shared equally between irrigators, the environment, and Melbourne; and
- a major expansion of the Victorian Water Grid with pipelines to connect Melbourne's water system with the desalination plant and Northern irrigation upgrades.

These projects are expected to deliver a 50 per cent boost to Melbourne's water supply within five years and allow water to be moved where it is needed most.

=== Perth ===
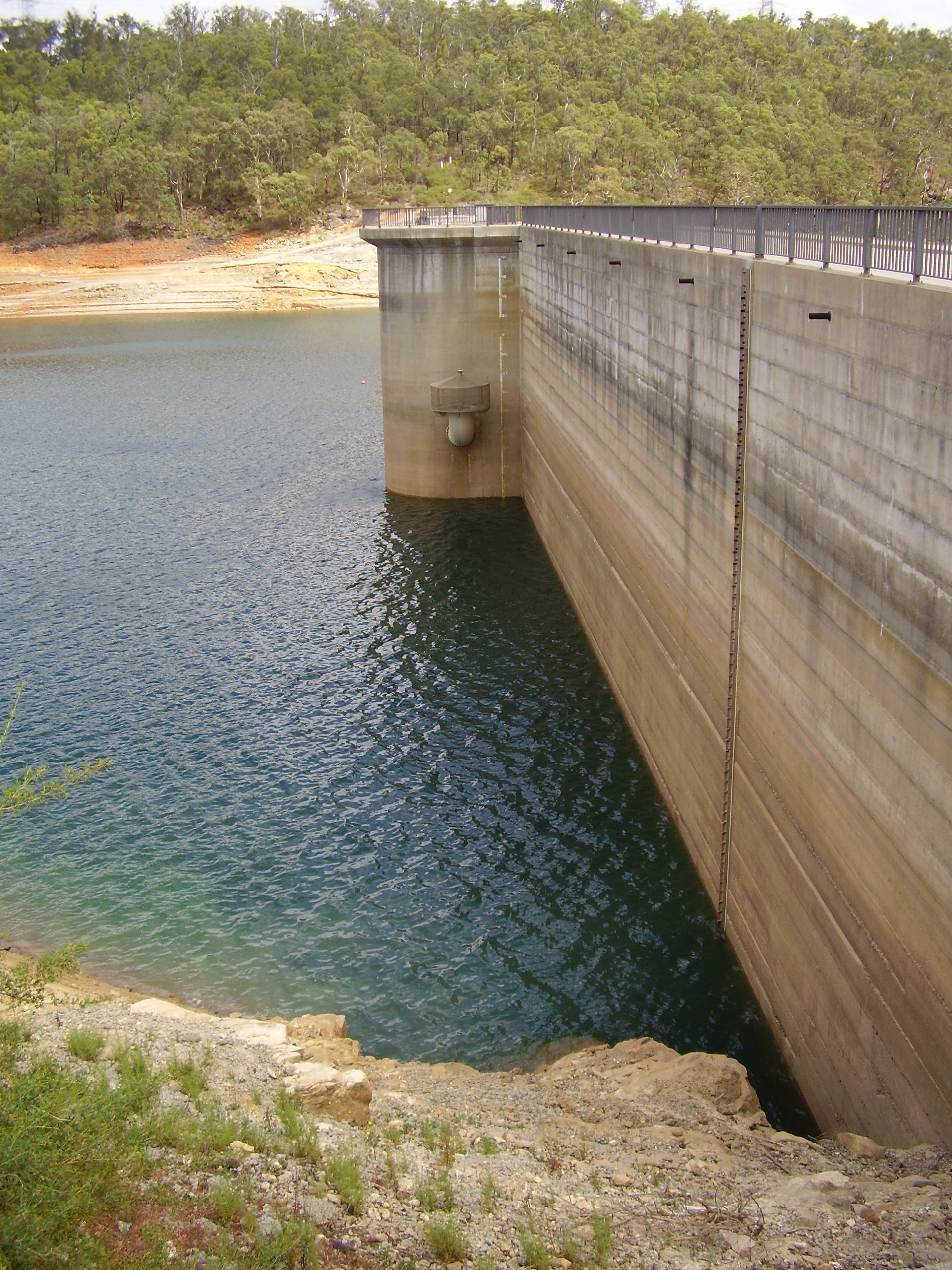
The New Victoria Dam, shown here at 30.6% of capacity, supplies water to Perth.

Perth receives approximately 10% to 20% of its water from a series of reservoirs, 40% from groundwater sources (mostly from the Gnangara groundwater system north of Perth), and 40% from two seawater desalination plants. Perth's climate has dried considerably since the 1970s and average inflows to Perth's metropolitan dams have dropped to around 60 gigalitres a year on average compared with 340 gigalitres in 1975. In 2006, Perth became the first Australian city to operate a reverse osmosis seawater desalination plant, the Kwinana Desalination Plant, and a second seawater desalination plant began operation in 2013 in Binningup near Bunbury. Together these two plants can deliver 145 gigalitres of water each year. Stage 1 of a Groundwater Replenishment Scheme has commenced, and when fully operational in 2019 it will have the capacity to recharge 28 gigalitres of highly treated wastewater to the groundwater supplies.

=== Sydney ===
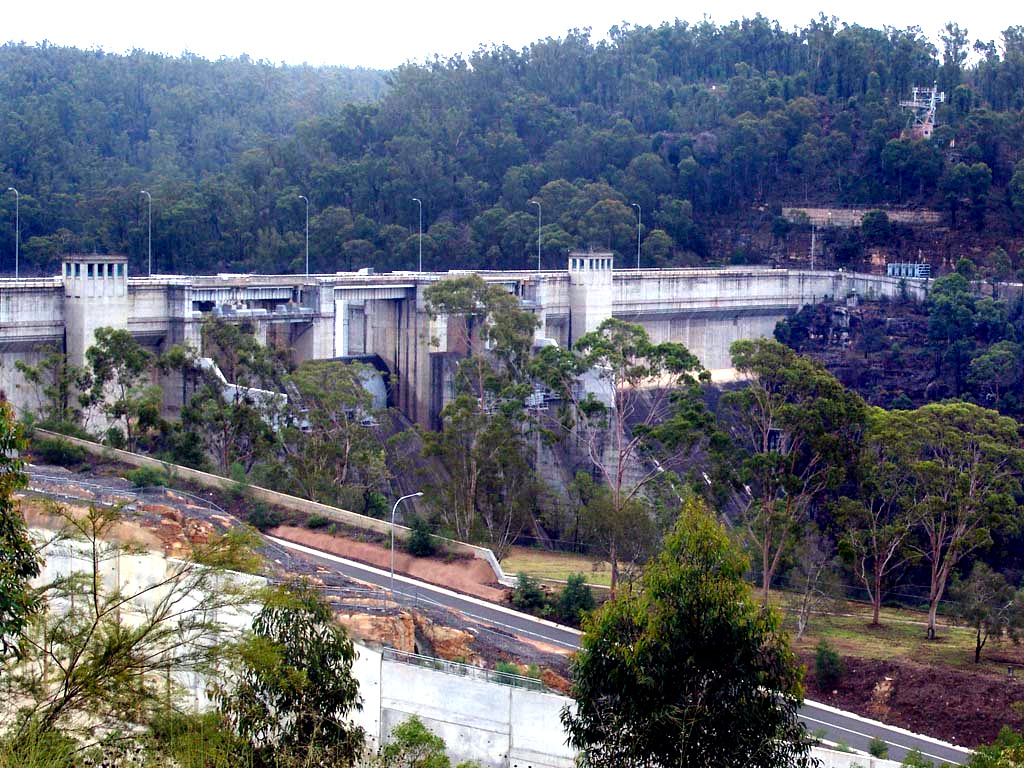
Warragamba Dam is the main source of water supply for Sydney.

More than five million people in Sydney, the Illawarra, the Blue Mountains and the Southern Highlands rely on the catchments of the Warragamba, Upper Nepean, Blue Mountains, Shoalhaven, and Woronora river systems to supply their drinking water. This is about 60 per cent of the population of New South Wales. These catchments cover an area of almost 16,000 square kilometres. They extend from north of Lithgow in the upper Blue Mountains, to the source of the Shoalhaven River near Cooma in the south – and from Woronora in the east to the source of the Wollondilly River west of Crookwell. The catchments are the source of the raw bulk water stored in reservoirs, which is then supplied to Sydney Water, Shoalhaven City Council and Wingecarribee Shire Council. Given low water levels in reservoirs due to drought Sydney Water announced in 2007 it would build the Kurnell Desalination Plant, powered by wind energy, that would supply up to 15% of the drinking water supply to Sydney, the Illawarra and the Blue Mountains. It is the largest water supply project for Sydney since the Warragamba Dam was opened in 1960.

== Responsibility for water supply and sanitation ==
=== Policy and regulation ===
The Constitution of the Commonwealth of Australia states that natural resource policy, including that relating to water, is a responsibility of the States: "The Commonwealth shall not, by any law or regulation of trade or commerce, abridge the right of a State or of the residents therein to the reasonable use of the waters of rivers for conservation or irrigation." (Section 100) However, this legal position has become less clear as a result of decisions by the Australian High Court. The Commonwealth Government has taken a much greater role in the Australian water sector in the early 21st century. The Minister for Water is in charge of water policies at the federal level. (Section 109) Of the Constitution of Australia provides that: When a law of a State is inconsistent with a law of the Commonwealth, the latter shall prevail, and the former shall, to the extent of the inconsistency, be invalid.

An example of the expanding role of the Commonwealth in the management of water resources is the federal takeover of the Murray-Darling Basin. In April 2007, amid a major drought, John Howard, then Prime Minister of Australia, announced that the region was facing an "unprecedentedly dangerous" water shortage and that water might have to be reserved for "critical urban" water supplies. The Federal Government proposed an A$10 billion Commonwealth take-over of the Murray-Darling Basin, arguing that effective management could not be undertaken by competing state governments. While the states of New South Wales, Queensland and South Australia as well as the Australian Capital Territory accepted the proposal, the state of Victoria initially refused to co-operate, arguing that its irrigators would be disadvantaged and that it would challenge the takeover in the High Court. Legislation to create the Murray-Darling Basin Commission was passed in both the House of Representatives and the Senate in August 2007 in the form of the Water Act of 2007. In March 2008, Premier John Brumby indicated that the Victorian government would participate in the program, in return for $1 billion to upgrade irrigation and continue water security for farmers.

National Water Initiative. In 1994 the Council of Australian Governments (COAG) agreed on a Water Reform Agenda to work towards reform in the water industry at the national level. In 2004, this was succeeded by the formation of the National Water Commission and the adoption of the National Water Initiative (NWI). The NWI "aims at increasing the productivity and efficiency of Australia 's water use and establishing clear pathways to return all water systems – rivers and groundwater – to environmentally sustainable levels of extraction". The government has also established Drinking Water Guidelines as part of a National Water Quality Management Strategy.

The Government of former Prime Minister Kevin Rudd had announced that it would invest in greater use of recycled water, water desalination and stormwater through a $1 billion urban water infrastructure fund. The Government also announced that it would assist households to install water and energy efficient products, with rebates for rainwater tanks and solar hot water.

The Small-scale Technology Certificate Scheme (STCs) provides federal incentives to households for installing renewable energy technologies such as solar hot water systems. Households receive a set number of STCs based on the system size, installation location, and remaining scheme duration. These STCs can be sold to buyers on the open market or through the STC Clearing House for approximately $40 per certificate.

State-level regulation. Various state agencies regulate water supply and sanitation in each state, with different arrangements found throughout Australia. State agencies with responsibilities in the sector include Water Commissions, Environmental Protection Agencies and Competition Authorities. They operate under different Departments (Ministries) such as Natural Resources and Water Departments and Trade Departments. For example, in Queensland under the Water Act 2000 water policy is the responsibility of the Queensland Water Commission, which is under the Department of Natural Resources, Mines and Energy and the Minister of Trade.

=== Service provision ===
At the local level, commercialisation and corporatisation of many Australian urban water businesses has led to management responsibilities being vested in commercial utilities, in contrast to earlier arrangements where services were provided directly by an arm of government. The role of the utility's board members is to provide commercial skill and focus, as well as to buffer the organisation from arbitrary political interference. The private sector is involved primarily through Build-Operate-Transfer (BOT) contracts for major treatment plants, including desalination plants.

The institutional arrangements for service provision vary among States and Territories. In parts of Queensland and in Tasmania, for example, local government is responsible for the provision of water services. In other states and territories, different arrangements have evolved. In New South Wales, Victoria and parts of Queensland, there are separate municipal retail service providers and state bulk service providers that cover large parts of each state. In other states, such as South Australia, Western Australia and the Northern Territory integrated state-level water utilities are in charge of both bulk water supply and retail distribution.

South East Queensland has reformed its water sector in 2008. Under the new structure three state-owned authorities (Seqwater, LinkWater and the SEQ Water Grid Manager) are in charge of bulk water supply:

- Seqwater supplies water from conventional sources such as dams, weirs and treatment plants as well as water from non-conventional sources such as the Gold Coast Desalination Plant and the Western Corridor Recycled Water Project.
- LinkWater owns the transport infrastructure, and
- the SEQ Water Grid Manager operates the transport infrastructure.

There are three retail utilities, each owned by a group of local governments:

- Queensland Urban Utilities, which distributes water in five council regions (Brisbane, Ipswich, Lockyer Valley, Scenic Rim and Somerset).
- Unity Water serving the Sunshine Coast and Moreton Bay,
- and Allconnex serves Logan City.

North West Queensland. In the Wide Bay-Burnett region of Queensland and in North West Queensland, the Government of Queensland owned SunWater provides bulk water to industrial, mining and power companies as well as local governments and farmers.

In Sydney, New South Wales, a catchment authority (Sydney Catchment Authority) has been established to supply water in bulk to the retail water and wastewater utility Sydney Water, a statutory State owned corporation, wholly owned by the Government of New South Wales.

In Melbourne, Victoria, three government-owned companies (City West Water, South East Water and Yarra Valley Water) are the retailers and the wholesaler is a government-owned corporation, Melbourne Water. The wholesaler also controls the catchment for most of its supply.

In Adelaide, South Australia, water and sanitation services are provided by SA Water. In 1996 the Government of South Australia awarded French-owned United Water a 15-year contract to manage and operate the metropolitan Adelaide water and wastewater systems on behalf of SA Water. SA Water retains ownership of all infrastructure, sets service standards, and implements the government's pricing policy. SA Water also maintains control of all asset investment decisions, billing and revenue collection. When the contract expired in 2011 SA Water decided not to short-list United Water for the follow-up contract. The South Australian government had accused the company of overcharging. In January 2011 the follow-up operation and maintenance contract with a duration of 6 years, plus another 6 years based on the performance during the first 6 years, was won by Allwater, a consortium consisting of Degrémont and Suez Environnement from France as well as the Australian company Transfield Services.

In Western Australia the Water Corporation, a government-owned corporation, provides urban water services.

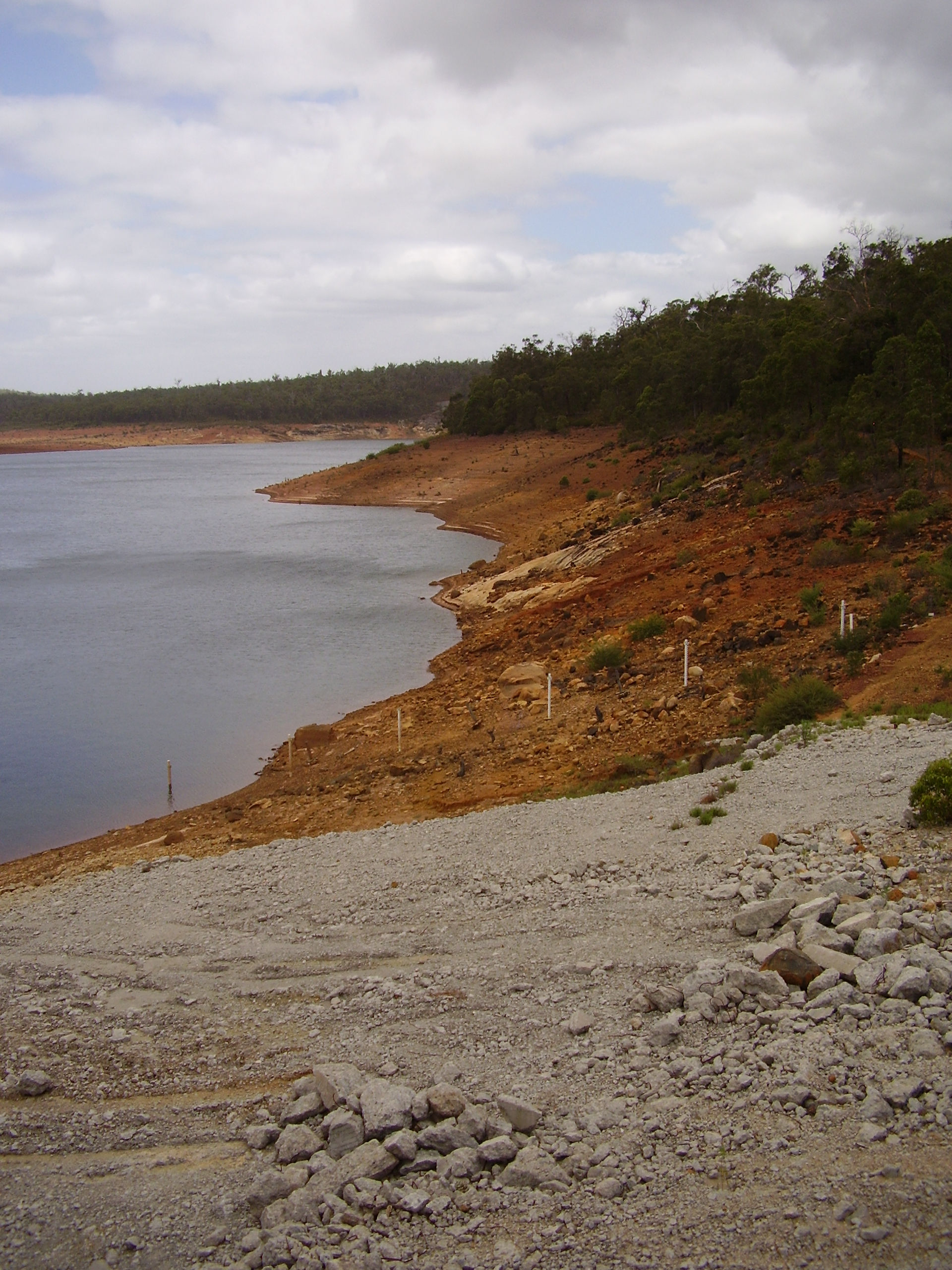
Canning Dam, one of Perth's major dams, at 34.4% of capacity

In Canberra, and the Australian Capital Territory generally, a public-private multi-utility partnership (ActewAGL), of which 50% is owned by the state-owned asset-holding company Icon Water, provides electricity, gas, water and wastewater services since 2000.

A government-owned multi-utility, PowerWater, provides services to the larger and less remote communities in the Northern Territory, including Alice Springs and Darwin.

Most organisations providing urban water services in Australia have experienced some degree of organisational reform in the 1990s, which has clarified accountabilities by separating policy, regulatory and commercial (operational) functions. The accepted wisdom is that this separation provides urban water businesses with clear commercial goals of customer service, while safeguarding public health and achieving environmental compliance in a sound business operation, free of other conflicting objectives.

For a brief profile of each of the 33 of the largest water companies in Australia see: WSAA Members

== Community consultation ==
The Water Reform Agenda, agreed in 1994, adopted the principle of public consultation by government agencies and service providers when change and/or new initiatives were being contemplated involving water resources. Subsequently, the Australian Drinking Water Guidelines emphasised the right of communities to participate in the development of policies relating to their water supply. The Guidelines also provide advice on how customers should be involved in considering options for effective and acceptable monitoring and reporting on performance of their water supply, and on the frequency of such reporting. The Water Reform Agenda also mentions the need for the public to be informed of the cause and effect relationship between infrastructure performance, standards of service and related costs, with a view to promoting levels of service that represent the best value for money to the community.

== Water tariffs ==
In Australia, most water businesses have changed from a charging system based largely on property value to one based on actual water consumed (a user-pays policy), in line with the Water Reform Agenda. Hunter Water in the Newcastle area of New South Wales pioneered this policy in Australia in the 1980s and reported a fall in household water consumption of 30 per cent over previous trends. This experience encouraged other water authorities to adopt the policy with a view to managing demand for water.

However, low-income households in Australia spend in proportional terms much more on utility services than high-income households. The implication is that increases in the price of utility services, if not accompanied by other compensation, will have a regressive and disproportionately negative impact on low-income households. It is generally expected that with the advent of expensive desalination water tariffs will have to increase in Australia.

Across Australia, the average typical annual residential bill for water supply and sewerage services was A$713 in 2007 (US$557 using the January 2007 exchange rate of 1.28). In South East Queensland the average annual water bill of only A$465 in 2005, but that it could increase to A$1,346 by 2017 due to increasing bulk water costs.

== Investment ==
In the capital cities alone, over A$2 billion of expenditure was undertaken in 2007/2008 (US$1.74 billion using the January 2008 exchange rate of 1.15). This expenditure is unprecedented in the industry. Urban water utilities invested A$835 million in replacing old and under-performing assets and A$535 million in maintaining asset reliability.

== Demand management and water conservation ==
Demand management measures to encourage consumers to use less water include advertising, education, pricing and appliance redesign. Furthermore, the use of alternatives to conventional water supply such as effluent reuse, rainwater harvesting and greywater use are also being encouraged through state-based rebates and the national not-for-profit Smart WaterMark label. Some water businesses in Australia have opted for restrictions on water use to conserve water supplies and minimise capital expenditure. A series of restriction levels, depending on remaining storage capacity in reservoirs, can curb the maximum daily consumption during drought periods. For example, several water authorities in very hot and dry regions of Australia have adopted a cooperative policy with consumers to restrict peak water usage on very hot days or to restrict garden watering to periods in which it is more effective.

== Wastewater reuse ==
When there are droughts in Australia, interest in reclaimed effluent options increases. Two major capital cities in Australia, Adelaide and Brisbane, have already committed to adding reclaimed effluent to their dwindling dams. The former has also built a desalination plant to help battle any future water shortages. Brisbane has been seen as a leader in this trend, and other cities and towns will review the Western Corridor Recycled Water Project once completed. Goulburn, Canberra, Newcastle, and Regional Victoria, Australia are already considering building a reclaimed effluent process. Indirect potable reuse (IPR) has been considered for regional communities in Goulburn, NSW, the Australian Capital Territory (ACT) and Toowoomba, Queensland.

In 2005, residents of Toowoomba rejected the proposal to reuse recycled water as drinking water in Toowoomba Water Futures referendum. The Western Corridor Recycled Water Scheme in South East Queensland was designed and built to produce drinking quality water suitable for release into the Wivenhoe Dam, Brisbane's principal water storage. The advanced wastewater treatment plant (WWTP) incorporated microfiltration (MF) and reverse osmosis (RO) followed by an advanced oxidation system using UV-light and hydrogen peroxide to remove specific disinfection by-products and non-specific low molecular weight organics. The project had a production capacity of 232,000 m^{3} per day and over 200 km of interconnecting and product water delivery pipelines.

In Perth in Western Australia, the Western Australia Water Corporation operated a three-year demonstration project investigating the feasibility of reclaiming water from the Beenyup wastewater treatment plant using MF, RO and UV disinfection prior to injection into the Leederville aquifer (production of 5,000 m^{3} per day). The demonstration concluded in 2012, and in 2013 the Western Australian Government agreed to a full-scale groundwater recharge scheme, which commenced construction in 2014. When complete, the full-scale facility will provide 14,000,000 m^{3} per annum to the aquifers supplying Perth's drinking water, with the option to expand to 28,000,000 m^{3} per annum in the future.

While there are currently no full-scale direct potable reuse schemes operating in Australia, the Australian Antarctic Division is investigating the option of installing a potable reuse scheme at its Davis research base in Antarctica. To enhance the quality of the marine discharge from the Davis wastewater treatment plant, a number of different, proven technologies have been selected to be used in the future, such as ozonation, UV disinfection, chlorine, as well as UF, activated carbon filtration and RO.

Non-potable reuse (NPR) examples: Melbourne, Mount Buller Ski resort uses recycled water for snow making, Sydney.

Reclaimed water has been proposed, but not yet implemented, for either potable or non-potable use in these locations: South East Queensland (planned for potable use as of late 2010), Newcastle (proposed for non-potable use as of 2006), Canberra (proposed in January 2007 as a backup source of potable water)

== See also ==
- 1998 Sydney water crisis
- Australian Water Association
- Climate change in Australia
- Drought in Australia
- Peter Cullen, a leading Australian water scientist
- Water data transfer format
- Water restrictions in Australia
- Water security in Australia
