= LinkWater =

Former Queensland statutory authority

Queensland Bulk Water Transport Authority

Statutory authority overview
- Formed: 1 July 2008
- Dissolved: 31 December 2012
- Superseding Statutory authority: Seqwater
- Jurisdiction: South East Queensland, Australia
- Motto: Moving water to where it's needed most
- Parent department: Department of Energy and Water Supply
- Key document: South East Queensland Water (Restructuring) Act 2007 (QLD)

LinkWater, the trading name of the Queensland Bulk Water Transport Authority, a former statutory authority of the Government of Queensland was in operation between 2008 and 2012. During this period, the authority was responsible for the management, operation and maintenance of potable bulk water pipelines and related infrastructure throughout South East Queensland, in Australia.

== Activities and functions ==
Linkwater was established on 2 May 2008 and began operations on 1 July 2008. On the 31 December 2012 Linkwater ceased operations as it was merged into Seqwater.

In 2008–2009, LinkWater established operational control for 535 kilometres (332 mi) of potable bulk water pipelines and related infrastructure that forms the backbone of the SEQ Water Grid. This infrastructure is made up of existing assets acquired from councils under the South East Queensland Water (Restructuring) Act 2007 (QLD), three new reverse-flow pipelines constructed by LinkWater projects and two connected pipelines constructed by other alliances. In addition to bulk water pipelines, related infrastructure under LinkWater's control comprises 28 reservoirs/balance tanks, 22 pump stations and six water quality facilities. As the network controller, LinkWater moved on average 600 megalitres (130,000×10^{3} imp gal; 160,000×10^{3} US gal) of water per day across the SEQ Water Grid, to where it is needed most.

== See also ==
- Queensland Water Commission
- Seqwater
- Water security in Australia
- Water supply and sanitation in Australia
