= Brisbane Water (utility) =

Government agency in Brisbane, Australia

Government business enterprise overview
- Dissolved: 30 June 2010
- Superseding Government business enterprise: Queensland Urban Utilities
- Type: Local government authority
- Jurisdiction: Brisbane, Queensland, Australia
- Parent department: Brisbane City Council
- Key document: South East Queensland Water (Restructuring) Act 2007 (QLD)

Brisbane Water was a former government business enterprise of the Brisbane City Council, a local government authority with administrative responsibility for the City of Brisbane, Queensland, in Australia. Brisbane Water was responsible for the distribution of reticulated potable water throughout Brisbane, as well as the treatment and transport of bulk water to the local government areas of Brisbane City, Ipswich City, Logan City, Redcliffe City, Pine Rivers Shire, and Caboolture Shire. Brisbane Water operated the city's reticulated sewerage network and associated treatment plants.

On 1 July 2010 the functions of Brisbane Water were formally assumed by the Queensland Urban Utilities, a statutory authority of the Government of Queensland, with shares resting in the local government authorities of Brisbane, Ipswich, Lockyer Valley, Scenic Rim, and Somerset councils.

== History ==
Brisbane Water ceased operating as a business unit of Brisbane Council as part of a restructure introduced by the then Lord Mayor, Campbell Newman. The division was renamed initially as Brisbane City Council - Water Distribution.

In 2008, BCC - Water Distribution transitioned bulk water treatment and transport assets, functions, and some staff to newly created Queensland state government water authorities, with the government's Southeast Qld Water Reforms enforced by the South East Queensland Water (Restructuring) Act 2007 (QLD). From late 2009, the BCC - Water Distribution division changed its trademark temporarily to Queensland Urban Utilities, as part of a phased transition into the final stage of previously announced state government water reforms requiring local councils to transition remaining water and sewerage distribution, and collection functions into new entities, with the transition enforced by the South-East Queensland Water (Distribution and Retail Restructuring) Act 2009 (QLD).

On 1 July 2010, Brisbane City Council ceased operating under the Queensland Urban Utilities trademark, with water distribution, and sewerage collection and treatment assets, functions and staff transitioned to the new Queensland Urban Utilities, a distributor-retailer statutory authority jointly owned by five local Councils. Simultaneously, the neighbouring distributor-retailers of UnityWater and AllConnex also commenced operations.

== See also ==
- Queensland Water Commission
- Seqwater
- Water security in Australia
- Water supply and sanitation in Australia
