= Lake Manchester Dam =

Dam in south-east Queensland, Australia

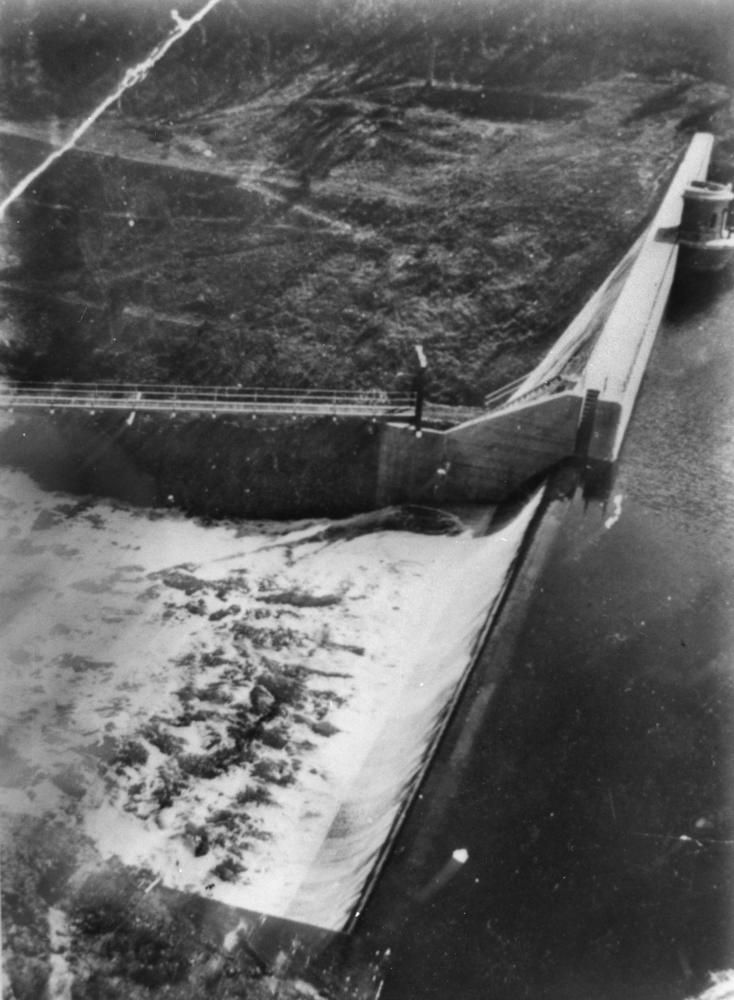
- The dam spillway in 1931

- Location of the dam in Queensland
- Interactive map of Lake Manchester Dam
- Country: Australia
- Location: South East Queensland
- Coordinates: 27°29′17″S 152°45′05″E
- Purpose: Potable water supply; Recreation
- Status: Operational
- Construction began: 1912
- Opening date: 1916; 2008 (upgrade)
- Built by: Arthur Midson
- Operator: SEQ Water

Dam and spillways
- Type of dam: Gravity dam
- Impounds: Cabbage Tree Creek
- Height: 43.8 m (144 ft)
- Length: 188 m (617 ft)
- Elevation at crest: 59.7 m (196 ft) AHD
- Width (crest): 4 m (13 ft)
- Dam volume: 45×10^{3} m^{3} (1.6×10^{6} cu ft)
- Spillway type: Uncontrolled
- Spillway length: 50 m (160 ft)
- Spillway capacity: 450 m^{3}/s (16,000 cu ft/s)

Reservoir
- Creates: Lake Manchester
- Total capacity: 26,217 ML (21,254 acre⋅ft)
- Catchment area: 74 km^{2} (29 sq mi)
- Surface area: 264 ha (650 acres)
- Normal elevation: 49 m (161 ft) AHD
- Website seqwater.com.au

The Lake Manchester Dam, also known as the Cabbage Tree Creek Dam, is a concrete gravity dam across Cabbage Tree Creek, in the eponymous settlement of Lake Manchester, in the City of Brisbane, in south-east Queensland, Australia. The main purpose of the dam is for potable water supply of Brisbane. The impounded reservoir is called Lake Manchester.

== Location and features ==
The dam is located in the area surrounding the eponymous suburb, approximately 15 kilometres (9.3 mi) north of Ipswich. The primary inflow of the reservoir is Cabbage Tree Creek, not far above its confluence with the Brisbane River to the south-west of the dam. (Note: Located at 27.5008°S 152.7359°E) The original purpose of the dam was to supplement supplies when the flow of the Brisbane River was low. Today it is one of a number of dams connected to the SEQ Water Grid.

The concrete dam structure is 43.8 metres (144 ft) high and 188 metres (617 ft) long. The resultant reservoir has a capacity of 26,217 megalitres (21,254 acre⋅ft) when full and a surface area of 264 hectares (650 acres), drawn from a catchment area of 74 square kilometres (29 sq mi) that includes much of the western slopes of the D'Aguilar Range. The uncontrolled un-gated spillway comprises a broad-crested weir with flip bucket that has a discharge capacity of 450 cubic metres per second (16,000 cu ft/s).

Initially managed by the Metropolitan Water Supply and Sewerage Board, and then the Brisbane City Council, management of the dam was transferred to SEQ Water in July 2008.

=== History ===
The Enoggera Dam, the Gold Creek Dam and the Mount Crosby Weir were built to supply water to Brisbane but could not meet growing demand. A site 2.8 kilometres (1.7 mi) upstream from the creek's confluence with the Brisbane River was selected as this was the next catchment to the west in the D'Aguilar Range. The designer was Allan Hazen, an American engineer. Construction of the Lake Manchester Dam commenced in 1912 and when it was completed in 1916, it was the fourth–oldest dam in Queensland and was originally called the Cabbage Tree Creek Dam. The dam was renamed in 1916 in honour of E. J. T. Manchester, the president of the Metropolitan Water Supply and Sewerage Board. In 1924 the elevation of the bywash was raised which added to the dam's capacity.

In October 2005 the dam was reactivated as drought reduced the region's water supply to a critical point. The same year a report claimed that due to leaks and cracks the structure could break in a severe rain storm event. In 2007 the dam's capacity was again raised and connection to the regional water grid was re-established. The Lake Manchester Dam Flood Security Upgrade was a Brisbane City Council project to ensure that the dam met the Australian National Committee on Large Dams guidelines for large dams. The project involved strengthening and raising the dam wall for flood security purposes. Work began in early 2007 and was completed in 2008.

== Recreation ==
Recreational activities which are permitted around the reservoir include barbecuing, camping, horse riding, mountain biking, picnicking and bushwalking.

== See also ==
- List of dams in Queensland
