= Ewen Maddock Dam =

- Location of the Ewen Maddock Dam in Queensland
- Country: Australia
- Location: Landsborough, South East Queensland
- Coordinates: 26°40′51″S 153°0′22″E
- Purpose: Potable water supply
- Status: Operational
- Construction began: 1973
- Opening date: 1976; upgrade 1982
- Operator: SEQ Water

Dam and spillways
- Type of dam: Earth fill dam
- Impounds: Addlington Creek
- Height: 11.4 m (37 ft)
- Length: 660–728 m (2,165–2,388 ft)
- Dam volume: 352×10^{3} m^{3} (12.4×10^{6} cu ft)
- Spillway type: Uncontrolled
- Spillway capacity: 132 m^{3}/s (4,700 cu ft/s)

Reservoir
- Total capacity: 16,587 ML (3.649×10^{9} imp gal; 4.382×10^{9} US gal)
- Catchment area: 21 km^{2} (8.1 sq mi)
- Surface area: 397 ha (980 acres)
- Maximum length: 3.1 m (10 ft)
- Maximum width: 2.6 m (8 ft 6 in)
- Maximum water depth: 4.5 m (15 ft)
- Website www.seqwater.com.au

The Ewen Maddock Dam is an earth-fill embankment dam with an un-gated spillway across the Addlington Creek that is located in Landsborough in the South East region of Queensland, Australia. The main purpose of the dam is for potable water supply of the Sunshine Coast region.

== Location and features ==
The Ewen Maddock Dam is situated within the locality of Landsborough 3 kilometres (1.9 mi) from the town of Landsborough and approximately 5 kilometres (3.1 mi) southeast of Mooloolah and to supply the fast-growing region with town water. The dam is built across the Addlington Creek, a tributary of the Mooloolah River, and was commenced in 1973, completed in 1976, with a subsequent upgrade to the height of the spillway in 1982.

The earthfill dam structure is 11.4 metres (37 ft) high and 660–728 metres (2,165–2,388 ft) in length to hold back 16,587-megalitre (3.649×10^{9} imp gal; 4.382×10^{9} US gal) reservoir when at full capacity. From a catchment area of 21 square kilometres (8.1 sq mi), the dam creates an unnamed reservoir with an average depth of 4.5 metres (15 ft). The surface area of the 3.1-kilometre (1.9 mi) long and 2.6-kilometre (1.6 mi) wide reservoir is 397 hectares (980 acres). The uncontrolled un-gated spillway has a discharge capacity of 132 cubic metres per second (4,700 cu ft/s). The dam is managed by Seqwater.

=== Water supply ===
In the past, raw water from the dam has been supplied to a treatment plant at Caloundra. Since 1988 Ewen Maddock Dam was not used as a water source due to a lack of working water treatment infrastructure. In 2007, work began on an A$30 million water treatment plant that will allow the dam to supply drinking water to the South East Queensland Water Grid, via the Northern Pipeline inter-connector. The Queensland Government incorporated a 100-metre (330 ft) timber boardwalk along the reservoir's edge into the revised master plan when open space at Ewen Maddock Park was resumed for the treatment plant's construction.

== Recreation ==
Swimming is permitted in the reservoir. Boating is limited to paddle power, due to the likelihood that powered boats would agitate the water and cause noxious weeds to break apart and spread.

Access is limited to daylight hours and no camping is permitted, except at a group camping site with cabins and dormitories, called the Ewen Maddock Dam Recreation Centre which is located at the south eastern end of the lake.

== Fauna and Flora ==
Ewen Maddock Dam is stocked with bass, silver perch, golden perch and southern saratoga, while bony bream is also present naturally. As Of September 1, 2016 the lake is on the "Stocked impoundments" register and requires a "SIPS" permit for fishing. The lake is weedy and shallow, except in the northern parts close to the dam wall. The weed species, Cabomba and Salvinia, have been the target of weed eradication programs by CalAqua. The dam is a good place to see jabirus. South-eastern banks of the lake are heavily forested and protected within the Beerwah State Forest.

== See also ==
- List of dams in Queensland
