= SEQ Water Grid =

Water operator for South East Queensland

Coordinates: 27°21′15″S 152°36′10.3″E

Water grid overview
- Jurisdiction: South East Queensland
- Key document: South East Queensland Water (Restructuring) Act 2007 (QLD)
- Website: seqwater.com.au

The SEQ Water Grid is a region-wide, long term, water supply scheme that provides a sustainable water infrastructure network for the South East region of Queensland, Australia. The project was the largest urban response to the drought in Australia, which severely affected water supplies in Brisbane and surrounds, particularly between 2004 and 2007. The basic component of the project was a 535-kilometre (332 mi) network of potable bulk water pipelines that connect areas that have an oversupply of water to those areas lacking water. The project went online in October 2008 and by November 2008 parts of the region were receiving a diversified supply of water for the first time.

== Features and structure ==
The SEQ Water Grid was initially managed by a partnership between Seqwater, LinkWater and the SEQ Water Grid Manager. The total cost of the project was A$6.9 billion. On 1 January 2013, the SEQ Water Grid Manager, LinkWater, Seqwater and parts of Queensland Water Commission were amalgamated into the Queensland Bulk Water Supply Authority trading as Seqwater. The authority is a state-owned corporation that owns and operates the SEQ Bulk Water Supply System or the Bulk Water Supply Chain.

The plan for the Water Grid was originally laid out in the Queensland Water Commission's South East Queensland Water Strategy, a 50-year strategy to maintain adequate water supply. The main objectives are to respond to the drought and provide long term water security for the region, particularly to avoid the need to place severe water restrictions on residents. Other aims of the Water Grid are to move risk away from individual water storage facilities to the regional level and to efficiently coordinate the utility of water sources in South East Queensland.

== Components ==
Existing facilities that have become part of the Water Grid include Wivenhoe Dam, Somerset Dam, North Pine Dam and Baroon Pocket Dam, along with eight other dams that make up the 12 connected dams. Part of the project involved the construction of the Gold Coast Desalination Plant to convert sea water to drinking water and the Western Corridor Recycled Water Scheme to purify treated wastewater for supply to power stations and industrial and agricultural customers. Purified recycled water will also be added to the water supply once combined dam levels fall below 40 per cent.

Two major pipelines, called the Northern and Southern Pipeline Interconnectors, link water storage facilities near Gympie in the north of the region and the Gold Coast area, south of Brisbane. Wyaralong Dam and the completed Cedar Grove Weir are part of the plans. These water reservoirs provide significant new supply and are needed to meet the region's growing demand up until 2050. In 2008 Lake Manchester Dam and Enoggera Dam were reactivated to supplement supply. The project also encompasses a raising of the Hinze Dam dam wall and the connection of the Leslie Harrison Dam and Ewen Maddock Dam to the regional network.

=== Current SEQ Water Grid bulk water assets ===
- 12 connected dams
- 10 connected drinking water treatment plants
- 3 advanced wastewater treatment plants producing purified recycled water
- 1 desalination plant
- 28 water reservoirs
- 22 bulk water pump stations
- 535 kilometres (332 mi) of potable bulk water mains

== See also ==
- Water supply and sanitation in Australia
- Water security in Australia
