= Sinclair Knight Merz =

Australian strategic consulting company

- Formerly: Sinclair Knight
- Industry: Consulting
- Founded: 1964
- Founder: Bruce Sinclair; Jack Knight
- Defunct: December 2013
- Headquarters: Australia
- Key people: Santo Rizzuto (CEO); Peter Scott (Chairman)
- Services: Strategic consulting, engineering and project delivery
- Revenue: $1.3 billion (2013)
- Number of employees: 7,500 + (2013)
- Website: www.globalskm.com

Sinclair Knight Merz (SKM) was a private Australian company operating across Asia-Pacific, the Americas, Europe, the Middle East and Africa. The company had global capability in strategic consulting, engineering and project delivery. In 2013 the business was purchased by Jacobs and the brand retired.

== History ==
Sinclair Knight Merz was founded in 1964 in Sydney by Bruce Sinclair and Jack Knight. In 1996 it merged with Merz Australia to form Sinclair Knight Merz.

In 1999, SKM merged with Kingston Morrison of New Zealand and Modus Consulting Engineers from the United Kingdom.

In the early 2000s further merges occurred with HS Liao of Malaysia, Murray North of Singapore, Ingenco, and Kirkman & Bradford in Scotland. In 2004 the Overseas Projects Corporation of Victoria was purchased from the Government of Victoria along with CCD Australia. Minmetal of Chile was purchased in 2005 and HBH of Perth in 2006.

In October 2011 the rail division of Mouchel was purchased. In September 2013 Jacobs agreed terms to purchase the business with the transaction completed in December 2013 and the brand retired.

== Controversies ==
SKM faced criminal charges between 2006 and 2011 for suspected bribing of officials in Vietnam, and between 2000 and mid-2005 in the Philippines. Jacobs became aware of conduct whilst conducting due diligence ahead of it purchasing SKM and self reported to the Australian Federal Police. In September 2023 the Supreme Court of New South Wales imposed a fine of $1.4 million.

== Notable projects ==
- El Teniente, Chile (engineering and design)
- Hume Highway, Australia (road, bridge, drainage design and environmental management)
- Irrigation Modernisation Project, Victoria, Australia (engineering design and program management))
- Eden Project (structural and civil design)
- Athens Olympic Stadium (structural design)
- Wembley Stadium redevelopment (seating and roof design)
- Gold Coast Desalination Plant (engineering and design)
- Port upgrade, Dampier, Western Australia (engineering, procurement and construction management)
- The Roundhouse, London (structural engineering and roof design)
- Project Seabird – Indian naval base (planning, design, civil and construction supervision services)
- Dublin Light Rail system (track, civil, structural and building design)
- Hobart class destroyer program (detail design, marine engineering, risk management, infrastructure engineering)
- Albury-Wodonga Hume Freeway bypass (design)
- Central Motorway Junction, Auckland, New Zealand (strategic planning and project delivery)
- Sydney Desalination Plant
