= Department of Employment, Economic Development and Innovation =

Former Queensland Government department

Department of Employment, Economic Development and Innovation (DEEDI) was the Queensland Government department for employment, economic development and innovation for the state of Queensland. It was established on 26 March 2009. Following a change of Government on 24 March 2012, the department was split into multiple agencies as part of the machinery of government changes.

Functions of the former Department of Employment, Economic Development and Innovation are now administered by the following departments: Department of State Development, Infrastructure and Planning; Queensland Treasury and Trade; Department of Education, Training and Employment; Department of Agriculture, Fisheries and Forestry; Department of Natural Resources and Mines; Department of Energy and Water Supply; Department of Science, Information Technology, Innovation and the Arts; Department of National Parks, Recreation, Sport and Racing; Department of Tourism, Major Events, Small Business and the Commonwealth Games

The Department had included the following units:

- Business development
- Employment and Indigenous Initiatives
- Get out there
- Industry Development
- Invest Queensland
- Mines and Energy
- Office of Clean Energy
- Primary Industries and Fisheries
- Queensland's Energy Futures
- Office of Racing
- Rural and Regional Communities
- Science and Innovation
- Tourism Queensland
- Trade Queensland
- Skilled and Business Migration
