= Murray–Darling Cap =

The Murray–Darling Cap is a policy limiting irrigation diversions in the Murray–Darling Basin (Australia) to the volume of water that would have been diverted under 1993/94 levels of development. It seeks to strike a balance between the amount of water available to irrigators, the security of their water supply, and the environment. The Cap was introduced by the Murray–Darling Basin Ministerial Council in June 1995 after the release of the report titled "An Audit of Water Use in the Murray-Darling Basin".

The Murray–Darling system is a highly variable system in terms of inflows, and can vary between discharges of 1,600 GL and 53,000 GL. The average flow is 21,200 GL per year. In the six years prior to 1994 an average of 10,800 GL had been diverted, mostly for agricultural purposes. The diversion were having a significant impact on the ecological health of the Murray-Darling river system.

The Cap limits surface water diversions to a long-term mean of 12,100 GL per year (383 m^{3}/s, 13,500 cu ft/s). Seasonal adjustments are made for wet and dry years. The introduction was seen as the first step in water management methods that progressed towards sustainable development of the river system. The Cap made water in the Basin a more valuable resource as it gave entitlements to its diversion more value and saw increased trade in these entitlements. While the Cap restrains further increases in water diversions, it does not constrain new developments, provided the water for them is obtained by using water more efficiently or by purchasing water from existing developments.

The Murray–Darling Basin Plan 2012 introduced Sustainable Diversion Limits (SDL), which will eventually replace the Cap. SDL came into effect in 2019, and will run in parallel to the Cap until it is fully implemented and the Murray–Darling Basin Agreement is amended or repealed.

== See also ==
- Murray Darling Basin Authority
- Water security in Australia
