= Point Paterson Desalination Plant =

It has a great history

Coordinates: 32°36′21″S 137°48′09″E

- Interactive map of Point Paterson Desalination Plant
- Location: Winninowie, South Australia
- Estimated output: 15 megalitres per day
- Extended output: 123 megalitres per day
- Cost: A$370 million (2010)
- Energy generation offset: Solar Thermal Generation on site
- Cost offsets: Salt Harvesting
- Technology: Multi Effects and Reverse Osmosis
- Percent of water supply: More than 100% of Spencer Gulf (residential supply)
- Operation date: Project cancelled

The Point Paterson Desalination Plant was a planned municipal-scale solar-powered desalination plant with land-based brine disposal near Point Paterson in the locality of Winninowie in the Australian state of South Australia about 13 kilometres (8.1 mi) south of the city centre of Port Augusta. The Point Paterson Project was to utilise a salt flat owned by a salt company but which has not been in use for solar salt production for decades. The plant would have integrated renewable energy and desalination technologies to create environmentally-friendly electricity and water. In particular, the project would have significantly reduced the usual greenhouse impacts associated with grid electricity demand for desalination. The project had attracted the interest of internationally renowned climatologist, the late Professor Stephen Schneider, who joined the Board of Acquasol in 2006.

If the plant had been built, it was expected to produce 5.5 gigalitres of water per year, enough to supply the needs of 34,000 people. Port Augusta (13,257 people) would receive 2 gigalitres per year free of cost during the first two years of the plant's operation. The plant would have been configured to expand if need be, with a potential output of 45 gigalitres per year.

The project never received enough funding, and the company was declared insolvent in 2014.

== Salt harvesting ==
As the plant was to be built on the site of a salt pan, brine wastewater from the desalination process would be diverted onto the pan rather than pumped back into the gulf. Once the brine evaporates, the remaining salt was to be harvested and sold. The profits from the salt harvesting will be used to offset the cost of the desalination process while simultaneously preventing wastewater from being pumped back into the Spencer Gulf.

== See also ==
- List of desalination plants in Australia
