= Gold Coast Desalination Plant =

Desalination plant in Australia

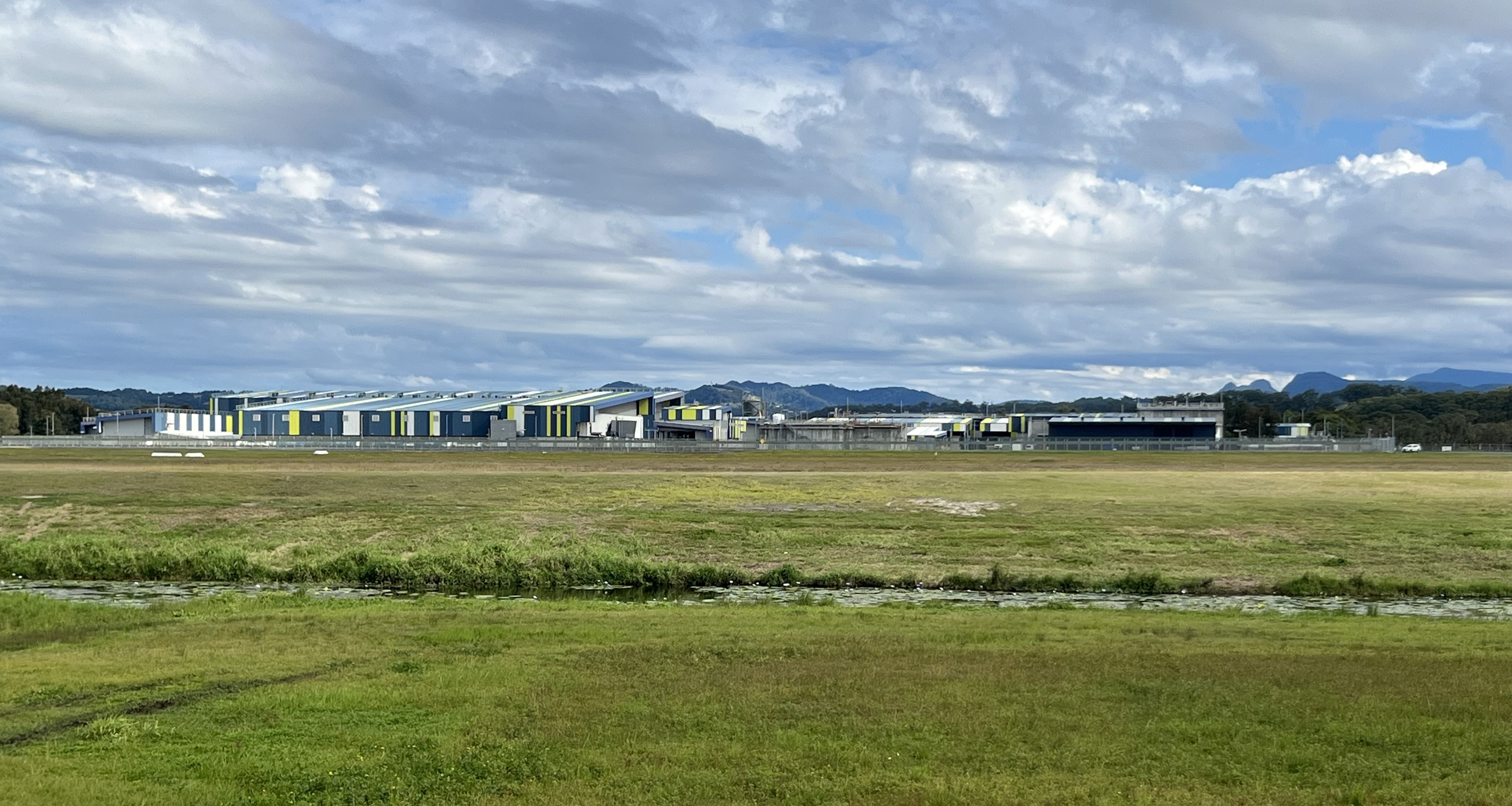
- Interactive map of Gold Coast Desalination Plant
- Coordinates: 28.1571°S 153.497°E
- Estimated output: 125 ML per day
- Daily capacity: 133 ML per day
- Cost: A$1.2 Billion
- Energy usage: 3.58 kWh/m3
- Percent of water supply: 27% of South Eastern QLD

The Gold Coast Desalination Plant is a 125 ML/d (46 gigalitres per year) reverse osmosis, water desalination plant located in Bilinga, a seaside suburb of the Gold Coast, in Queensland, Australia. It supplies water to the South East Queensland region via the South East Queensland Water Grid.

The plant first supplied water to the grid in February 2009. It is owned by Seqwater and operated by Veolia. As of Summer 2020/2021, the plant is operating at maximum production capacity.

== Project rationale and background ==
Water supplies in South East Queensland reached very low levels during Australia's 'Millennium drought', primarily from 2003 to 2009. The region's major water storages reached around 50% of capacity in mid-2005 and 20% in mid-2007. In response to this worsening situation a range of water infrastructure projects were proposed to bolster supplies in south east Queensland.

The Gold Coast City Council initially developed a plan for a 55 ML/day desalination plant during 2005., which was anticipated to cost around $260 million. Due to worsening drought conditions, in 2006 the Queensland Government joined with the Gold Coast to expand the plan to a 133 ML/day plant that could share output with the entire region. The Queensland Government contributed $869 million to the expanded project, which was to be developed through a 50:50 joint venture.

== Design and construction ==
The construction process was led by a group known as the Gold Coast Desalination Alliance. It consists of Veolia Water, John Holland Group, Sinclair Knight Merz and Cardno.

Investigations by the Gold Coast Desalination Alliance identified 13 possible sites of which three, Pimpama, Coombabah and Bilinga, were short-listed. The Gold Coast City Council chose Bilinga as the most suitable site for the desalination plant due to being closest to the coast, having low environmental impact and cost, and being best suited to achieving a timely construction process.

This choice was aligned with community values and expectations – community consultation conducted prior to construction highlighted that environmental impacts and cost were the most important issues when considering the location of the proposed plant. The Bilinga site is compatible with surrounding land use, requires the shortest intake and outlet pipelines of the three site options and the inlet and outlet pipes cross a minor fault line.

The plant is a 'two-pass' reverse osmosis desalination plant. The first pass removes salt, minerals and other microscopic particles, while the second pass targets boron and bromide specifications suitable for drinking water.

As well as the core desalination equipment, the project includes 1.5 kilometre marine intake and outlet tunnels, a 25 kilometre pipeline to connect to the South East Queensland Water Grid at Worongary, a pump station and a small reservoir.

=== Construction process and timeline ===
The project schedule was approximately:

- August to November 2006: initial design
- October 2006 to July 2008: tunnels and shafts
- November 2006 to June 2008: desalination plant
- July 2008 to November 2008: commissioning
- October 2008 to January 2009: optimisation.

The plant produced its first water in November 2008 and began supplying water to the grid in February 2009.

=== Defects ===
In January 2009, rust and valve problems delayed the plant's opening. The plant began operations in February 2009 and has been operating according to grid instructions since that time, except for a five-week shutdown in May 2009 and a three-month shutdown from June to August 2010 to repair previously identified defects. During the initial shutdown a formal investigation of these problems was undertaken. In June 2009 some further faults were identified, all bar one of which were rectified with the final piece of work to be completed by the end of August 2010. These defects did not affect the plant's ability to produce clean safe water but had implications for its long term viability. The Queensland Government refused to accept ownership of the plant until all problems were rectified.

=== Awards ===
It is the first large-scale desalination plant on Australia's eastern seaboard and was named Membrane Desalination Plant of the Year (2009) at the Global Water Awards.

=== Possible future expansion ===
There is potential to increase output to 167 megalitres a day. However the plant was identified as a reserve, rather than priority, site on the Queensland Government's list of possible sites for future desalination plants. Lytton and either Marcoola or Bribie Island are the priority sites.

The plant was officially handed over to the Queensland Government agency WaterSecure in October 2010. Since 1 July 2011 it is owned by Seqwater.

=== Environmental concerns ===
Ongoing monitoring is undertaken at the plant as part of its environmental licence. Underwater footage shows an abundance of marine life is now active around artificial reefs that have been created on the marine structures. Community groups such as the Queensland Conservation Council and GECKO have expressed concern over environmental issues with the project.

Desalination is an electricity-intensive way to produce water. The plant uses around 3.58 kilowatt-hours (kWh) of electricity for every cubic metre (kilolitre) of water it produces. To offset the carbon emissions associated with this electricity consumption, the plant operators purchase renewable energy certificates (RECs). The RECs have been produced by a range of renewable energy sources with the main source being solar hot water system installations. Other sources include solar photovoltaic, hydro and a small amount of wind.

=== Mothballing ===
Soon after being commissioned, rainfall and water storages increased in south east Queensland. Three major storages, Wivenhoe, Somerset Dam and North Pine dams, approached 80% of capacity in mid-2009 and reached 100% by the end of 2010.

Due to the availability of ample water in south east Queensland's dams, water supply costs and impacts on household water bills could be reduced by minimising the plant's operations. On 5 December 2010, then Natural Resources Minister, Stephen Robertson confirmed the plant would go into standby mode that month as a cost-saving measure.

The plant has been used for brief periods since 2010 for a range of contingencies. For example:

- in January 2013 it returned briefly to 100% operation to supply drinking water during the flooding of South-East Queensland due to Cyclone Oswald
- during September 2015 it returned to service when the Mudgeeraba water treatment plant was being refurbished
- during August 2016 it supplied around 360 ML of water while the Molendinar water treatment plant was being refurbished.
- between November 2019 and January 2020, the plant was operated at full capacity to help provide relief when the water grid dropped below 60 per cent capacity
- In Summer 2020/2021, the desalination plant was brought up to full capacity to allow for upgrades to the Mount Crosby Water Treatment Plant, which is expected to take more than two and a half years to complete.

The plant plays an important role in Seqwater's plans to manage future droughts.

== See also ==
- List of desalination plants in Australia
- Water security in Australia
