= Department of Energy & Water Supply =

Former Queensland government department

Department of Energy and Water Supply
Department overview
- Jurisdiction: Queensland
- Headquarters: 1 William Street, Brisbane
- Employees: 273
- Annual budget: $746,517,000
- Minister responsible: Mick de Brenni, Minister for Energy and Clean Economy Jobs
- Department executive: Paul Simshauser, Director-General
- Website: www.energyandclimate.qld.gov.au

The Department of Energy and Water Supply (DEWS) was a department of the Queensland Government which is responsible for the state's energy and water industries. The department's head office was at 1 William Street, Brisbane.

== History ==
The Department of Energy and Water Supply was established on 3 April 2012, as part of a series of changes to the machinery of government after the LNP's win at the 2012 election. The department took on some functions of the Department of Environment and Resource Management and the Department of Employment, Economic Development and Innovation, which were both dissolved. In 2017 the department was merged with the Department of Natural Resources and Mines to form the Department of Natural Resources, Mines and Energy.

== See also ==
- Department of Environment and Science
- Energy in Queensland
