= Seqwater =

Water agency for south east Queensland

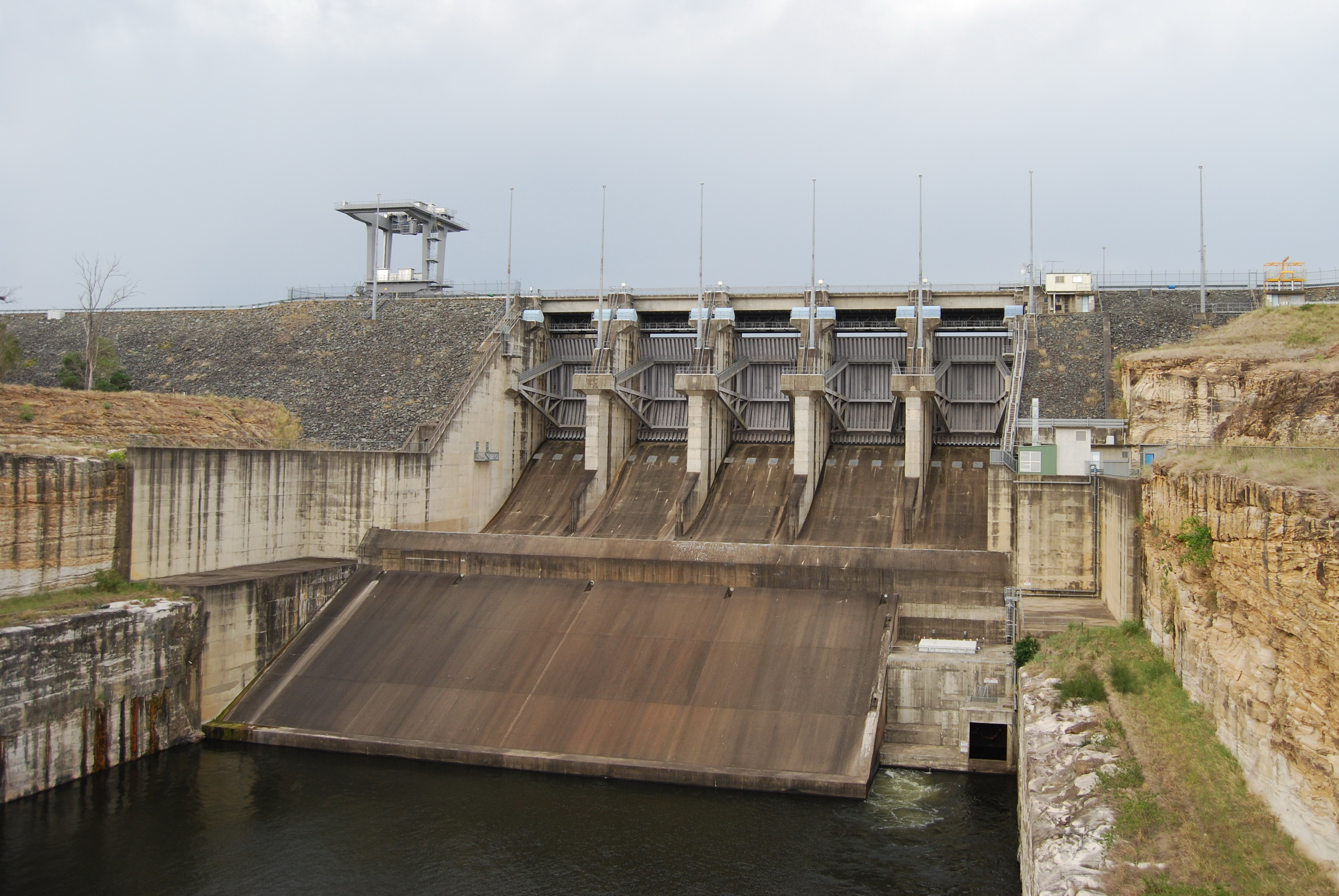
- The dam spillway gates of Wivenhoe Dam, an asset of seqwater

Statutory authority overview
- Formed: 1 July 2008
- Preceding agencies: Queensland Water Commission; SEQ Water Grid Manager; LinkWater
- Jurisdiction: South East Queensland
- Headquarters: Ipswich, Queensland, Australia
- Motto: Water for Life
- Annual budget: A$1,800 million
- Minister responsible: Minister for Natural Resources and Mines, Minister for Manufacturing and Minister for Regional and Rural Development; Treasurer
- Statutory authority executives: John McEvoy, Chairman; Emma Thomas, Chief Executive Officer
- Parent department: Department of Natural Resources and Mines, Manufacturing and Regional and Rural Development
- Key document: South East Queensland Water (Restructuring) Act 2007 (QLD)
- Website: seqwater.com.au

Seqwater is a statutory authority of the Queensland Government that provides bulk water storage, transport and treatment, water grid management and planning, catchment management and flood mitigation services to the South East Queensland region of Australia. Seqwater also provides irrigation services to about 1,200 rural customers in the regions that are not connected to the grid and provides recreation facilities.

Seqwater was established on 1 July 2008 pursuant to the South East Queensland Water (Restructuring) Act 2007 (QLD) alongside three other statutory authorities: Linkwater, the SEQ Water Grid Manager and WaterSecure. Since that time Seqwater has retained its bulk water storage and treatment, catchment management and flood mitigation assets and functions while acquiring additional assets and functions in two tranches:

- On 1 July 2011, the South East Queensland Water (Restructuring) Regulation 2011 transferred to Seqwater the assets and operating responsibilities of WaterSecure over the Western Corridor Recycled Water Scheme and the Gold Coast Desalination Plant, and the assets of Queensland Water Infrastructure Pty Ltd, principally the Wyaralong Dam.
- On 1 January 2013, further legislative changes gave Seqwater the following functions: the management, operation and maintenance of potable bulk water pipelines previously provided by LinkWater; the water grid management services provided by the SEQ Water Grid Manager; and the long term planning functions of the region's future water needs, a function that was formerly undertaken by the Queensland Water Commission.

Seqwater is managed by a chief executive who reports to a Board of Management that are ultimately responsible to the Minister for Natural Resources and Mines, Minister for Manufacturing and Minister for Regional and Rural Development, Minister for Water and the Queensland Treasurer and Minister for Trade and Investment. The Department of Natural Resources and Mines, Manufacturing and Regional and Rural Development and Queensland Treasury provides administrative oversight of the statutory authority.

== Background and functions ==
The formation of Seqwater was part of the reform of water supply arrangements by the Queensland Government that commenced in 2007. As part of these reforms an integrated approach to catchment-sourced management across the South East Queensland region was adopted with the expectation that this approach would help to ensure the long term security and sustainability of the region's catchment-based water supply.

Initially, Seqwater was established to manage bulk water facilities in the region, a function previously managed by 25 different local government, state government and corporate entities. Seqwater is responsible for 25 dams (including Wivenhoe Dam, Somerset Dam and North Pine Dam, Hinze Dam on the Gold Coast, and Baroon Pocket Dam on the Sunshine Coast), which provide as much as 90 per cent of South East Queensland's drinking water supply. In addition, Seqwater owns 47 weirs, as well as operating 46 water treatment plant facilities and 14 groundwater borefields across South East Queensland.

Seqwater is also responsible for a range of new water infrastructure projects and initiatives, including raising the dam wall of the Hinze Dam on the Gold Coast (completed in 2011), working with the Department of Infrastructure and Planning on the design phase of the Wyaralong Water Treatment Plant, and the fluoridation of the region's drinking water supply.

It currently manages more than $10 billion worth of water supply assets, including 600 kilometres of bulk water pipelines connecting the water grid from the Sunshine Coast in the north to the Gold Coast in the south, the Western Corridor Recycling Scheme and the Gold Coast Desalination Plant.

On 6 July 2015, Seqwater released Water for life, a 30 year plan outlining measures to ensure a secure water supply for South East Queensland over the period to 2045.

== See also ==
- Seawater desalination in Australia
- Water security in Australia
- Water supply and sanitation in Australia
