= Queensland Water Commission =

The Queensland Water Commission (QWC) is a defunct Queensland Government agency established to develop long term water supply strategies. The Commission was chaired by Mary Boydell and the chief executive officer was John Bradley.

The agency was responsible for setting water restriction policy and coordinating water infrastructure projects in the state. In South East Queensland, the Commission established a regional water grid known as the SEQ Water Grid and the Western Corridor Recycled Water Project. Together with new dams and desalination plants the Commission aimed to counter the worst effects of drought in Australia.

As part of 50-year South East Queensland water strategy the QWC recommended that the Government of Queensland focus on recycled water projects, rather than desalination plants, because desalination plants are too energy intensive and recycled water provides supply regardless of changes in climate.

On 1 January 2013, the Queensland Water Commission ceased operations. Policy-making functions of the Commission were assumed by the Queensland Department of Energy and Water Supply and its planning and regulatory functions became the responsibility of Seqwater.

== See also ==
- Seqwater
- SunWater
- Water security in Australia
