= Western Corridor Recycled Water Scheme =

- Recycled water project
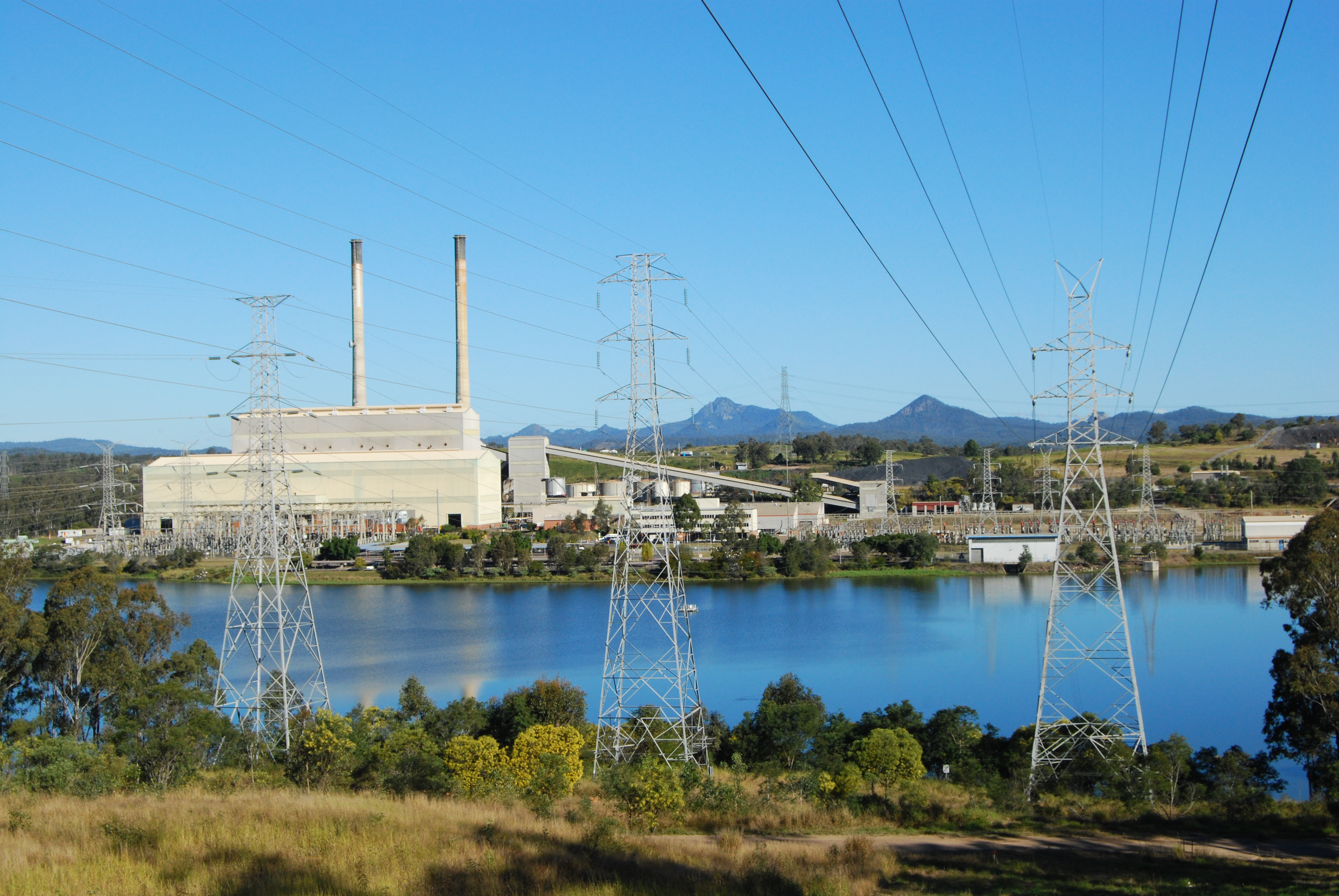
- Swanbank Power Station used recycled water from the scheme.

- Location of the Western Corridor Recycled Water Scheme in Queensland
- Country: Australia
- Location: South East Queensland
- Coordinates: 27°32′54″S 152°32′48″E
- Purpose: Recycle wastewater for industry and agriculture
- Status: Operational
- Construction began: 2006
- Opening date: November 2008
- Cost: A$2.5 billion
- Operator(s): Seqwater
- Total capacity: 232 ML (51×10^{6} imp gal; 61×10^{6} US gal) per day

The Western Corridor Recycled Water Scheme, a recycled water project, is located in the South East region of Queensland in Australia. The scheme is managed by Seqwater and forms a key part of the SEQ Water Grid constructed by the Queensland Government in response to population growth, climate change and severe drought. The A$2.5 billion project is reported as the largest recycled water project in Australia. As of 2019, the scheme has been constructed and its performance has been validated. It remains in care and maintenance mode, and will commence operation after SEQ Water Grid dam levels reach 60%.

== Location and features ==
The scheme involved the construction of three advanced water treatment plants constructed at Bundamba, Luggage Point and Gibson Island, which draw water from six existing wastewater treatment plants in the region to produce up to 232 megalitres (51×10^{6} imp gal; 61×10^{6} US gal) of purified recycled water daily. The treatment train consists of microfiltration, reverse osmosis, ultraviolet light with advanced oxidation and chlorine disinfection.

The water is distributed via a network of pipelines measuring more than 200 kilometres (120 mi) in length. Construction began on the Recycled Water Project in 2006 and completed in late 2008. A$408 million of funding was provided by the Australian Government via its Water Smart Australia Program.

In Stage 1 of the project the scheme has provided an alternative water source for Swanbank Power Station and both Tarong Power Station and Tarong North Power Station. Supplies to Swanbank started in 2007 and supplies to Tarong and Tarong North started in June 2008.

The system has the capacity to provide water to other industrial users, agricultural users and to supplement drinking water supplies in Wivenhoe Dam. Testing of the pipeline to Wivenhoe Dam has been conducted, however in November 2008, Premier Anna Bligh declared that recycled water will not enter the dam unless levels drop to below 40%. Initially, the three power stations were the main customers of the recycled water, consuming 112 megalitres (25×10^{6} imp gal; 30×10^{6} US gal) per day.

Since coming online in August 2007, through to July 2010, the Western Corridor Recycled Water Scheme has supplied more than 37 thousand megalitres (8.1×10^{9} imp gal; 9.8×10^{9} US gal) of water into the SEQ Water Grid.

In January 2013 it was reported that the Newman government was considering shutting down part or all of the scheme.

== See also ==
- Bradfield Scheme
- Goldfields Water Supply Scheme
- Irrigation in Australia
- Swanbank Power Station
