= Water security in Australia =

Water security in Australia became a major concern in Australia in the late 20th and early 21st century as a result of population growth, recurring severe droughts, effects of climate change on Australia, environmental degradation from reduced environmental flows, competition between competing interests such as grazing, irrigation and urban water supplies, and competition between upstream and downstream users. For example, there is competition for the resources of the Darling River system between Queensland, New South Wales and South Australia. Water reform was first placed on the national agenda at the 1994 Council of Australian Governments (COAG) meeting when a strategic framework was devised. As the knowledge of surface and groundwater systems grew and the awareness of the significance of sustainable water markets increased, further water reform was agreed to at the 2004 COAG meeting, under a national blueprint known as the National Water Initiative (NWI).

Australia can be divided into 12 major drainage divisions. For example, the Murray-Darling drainage division consists of the Murray River basin and the Darling River basin. Three of these drainage divisions account for 87% of the water that Australia consumes – the North East Coast division, the South East Coast division, and the Murray-Darling. This means that the supply of water within Australia is highly concentrated, and any defect to one of these major water divisions can cause major water security issues.

== Privatisation of water ==
In the 21st century, there have been attempts to establish a privatised water market in Australia, with Victoria acting as a model for other states. Many political parties, community groups, NGO's and other groups and people see the privatisation of water as a denial of basic human rights on behalf of state and federal governments. Water privatisation is a highly controversial issue and touches on the much broader arguments for and against the private control of formerly public services.

== Boundaries to water security ==
A major boundary which affects effective water management is the highly variable precipitation levels of Australia – Australian rainfall is more variable than rainfall in the rest of the world since it is driven by the Southern Oscillation rather than by seasonal changes. The result is that for the same level of reliability of supply, dams in Australia need to be six times as large as those in Europe and twice as large as the world average to ensure water sources do not run dry during dry seasons.

== Competition for water ==
=== Competition between states ===
In Australia there is competition for the resources of the Darling River system between Queensland, New South Wales and South Australia. Similarly, there is competition for the resources of the Murray River between NSW, Victoria and South Australia. The South Australian government established a new ministerial portfolio of Water Security as the water security issues facing South Australia and the Lower Lakes and Coorong emerged. South Australia also has an Independent Commissioner for Water Security.

=== Competition between regions ===
In Victoria a pipeline from the Goulburn River to Melbourne has led to protests by farmers against the linkage of Victoria's water system to facilitate the privatisation of water in the region.

=== Competition between uses ===
In the Macquarie Marshes of NSW grazing and irrigation interests compete for water flowing to the marshes which would otherwise support the environment. There have been a series of embankments built to channel water flowing towards the marshes to privately held commercial interests, some of which are being thought to have been done illegally.

=== Competition for environmental flows ===
The Snowy Mountains Scheme diverted water from the Snowy River to the Murray River and the Murrumbidgee River for the benefit of irrigators and electricity generation through hydro-electric power. In recent years, government has taken action to increase environmental flows to the Snowy in spite of severe drought in the Murray-Darling basin. The Government of Australia has implemented buy-backs of water allocations, or properties with water allocations, to endeavour to increase environmental flows.

== Regulatory agencies ==
=== Federal ===
==== National Water Commission ====
The National Water Commission was an independent statutory body within the Department of Sustainability, Environment, Water, Population and Communities that was established to implement the National Water Initiative and reform the broader national water agenda. The National Water Commission published a report on the future need for desalination technologies to play a role in securing Australia's water supplies. It also publishes a biennial assessment of progress in implementation of the National Water Initiative, the latest being in October 2009. The 2009 assessment nominates areas of slow or inadequate reform and makes 68 recommendations for action over the next two years. The commission was abolished in 2014.

== Research ==
The CSIRO is leading a Water for a Healthy Country Flagship research project to develop information technologies to help water managers.

The Urban Water Security Research Alliance has been formed to address South-East Queensland's emerging urban water issues.

The Wentworth Group of Concerned Scientists conducted research into the sustainability of water usage in Australia.

== Related environmental campaigns ==
The WWF campaigns for security of water flows to areas with such as Ramsar listed wetlands.

=== Snowy River flows ===
The Australian Conservation Foundation and Total Environment Centre campaigned for restoration of some environmental flows to the Snowy River which had been diverted to the Murray River by the Snowy Mountains Scheme for irrigation and power generation. This campaign led to a multi party agreement to restore some flows.

== National Plan For Water Security ==
In January 2005, the Federal Government published "A National Plan For Water Security". This was after the Wentworth Group of Concerned Scientists released its Blueprint for a Living Continent in November 2002. This blueprint set out a five-point plan.

The Intergovernmental Agreement on a National Water Initiative was signed at 25 June 2004 Council of Australian Governments meeting. The Tasmanian Government joined the Agreement in June 2005 and the Western Australia Government joined in April 2006.

== Major capital works for increased major urban water security ==
Several major capital works are currently under construction in an effort to privatise the nation's water. Water desalination has been introduced as a way of creating new water to increase the security of the supply of water, at huge financial costs, environmental losses and increased greenhouse gas emissions, while several pipelines are under construction in an effort to link regional systems to facilitate the trading of water. Price rises for consumers have been highest in Sydney where water deliveries are provided by Australia's largest utility, Sydney Water. The policies of several State Governments moves away from sustainable water management and divests themselves of their responsibilities to provide sustainable, just and affordable, potable water to their population.

=== Western Australia ===
The Government of Western Australia built the Perth Seawater Desalination Plant in an effort to privatise Western Australia's water system.

=== New South Wales ===
The Sydney Desalination Plant constructed by the Government of New South Wales at Kurnell near Botany Bay has commenced operations. The power usage is to be offset by a new wind farm. Sydney also draws water from the Shoalhaven River near Nowra.

Hunter Water proposes a dam, Tillegra Dam, on the Williams River in Dungog Shire in the Upper Hunter Region. When completed, the dam will hold 450 billion litres of water. The estimated cost of the dam was around $300 million. Included in the dam proposal is a hydro-power generation plant which will generate around 3,000 megawatt hours of energy each year. Hunter Water is also proposing to plant 1.5 million trees as carbon offsets. The need for this dam is strongly disputed and subject to review by the NSW Government Department of Planning. Hunter Water claims the dam is required to "drought proof" Newcastle and the Central Coast. Opponents say the dam is grossly excessive for this need, will drown valuable agricultural land and greater water efficiency, demand management and recycling would eliminate the need for the dam.

=== South Australia ===
The Adelaide Desalination Plant, a 300 megalitre per day plant, began producing water in October 2011.

=== Victoria ===
Victoria has undertaken several major construction projects to link state water supplies. These projects were designed to establish a statewide water market in preparation for the privatisation of Victoria's water. The works included the Victorian Desalination Plant, which was completed in December 2012, the North–South Pipeline completely in February 2010 to carry water from the Goulburn River to Melbourne's Sugarloaf Reservoir in times of need, and an interconnector pipeline connecting the Geelong-Ballarat region.

Many argue that in privatising Victoria's water resources and creating a market to trade water between regions, the State Government is divesting itself from its core human rights responsibilities to ensure potable water to the population it represents. This would come at great environmental cost, increase energy usage, decrease efficience, ignore sustainable water management options and increase end-user water costs, placing water privatisation as a high risk to water security in Victoria, despite its acceptance by the state government.

=== Queensland ===
The Queensland government has developed the SEQ Water Grid, to enhance the state's water security with the Western Corridor Recycled Water Project being a key part. The Gold Coast Desalination Plant which has been built at Tugun on the Gold Coast, is another project that supplies water to markets in the South East Queensland region. The Queensland government investigated the possibility of building a pipeline from the Northern Rivers of New South Wales to South East Queensland to facilitate water trade between these regions.

== Major initiatives for increased rural water security ==
=== Murray Darling Basin ===
The Snowy Mountains Scheme increased water security to properties near the Murray and Murrumbidgee Rivers during the 1960s and 1970s. Overallocation of water licences and prolonged severe drought affecting snowfalls have undermined that security in the early 21st century.

=== Ord River Scheme ===
The Ord River Irrigation Scheme (ORIS) in the Kimberley region of Western Australia created Lake Argyle, Australia's second largest lake. ORIS provides water for irrigation to over 117 km^{2} of farmland and there are plans to extend the scheme to allow irrigation of 440 km^{2} in the future.

== Areas with critical water shortages ==
=== NSW ===
==== Lachlan River valley ====
On 24 October 2009 the Sydney Morning Herald reported that the Lachlan River would stop flowing west of Condobolin within weeks as flows are slashed to keep only part of the river flowing, that the Wyangala Dam could be empty by mid-summer (15 January 2010) and that thousands of households will need to have water trucked to them. This situation followed eight years of drought. Farmers in the area of the Lachlan Valley where the river will not flow are deeply concerned for the viability of their farms. More than 100,000 people live in the total Lachlan catchment. 14% of NSW agricultural production is generated in the region from a land area of approximately 10% of NSW.

=== South Australia ===
==== The Coorong ====
The Coorong's future is in doubt because of low flows of water reaching the mouth of the Murray River. Acid sulphate soils are being exposed as water levels drop in the Doorong and nearby lakes, adding to the problems in the region.

== See also ==
- Bradfield Scheme
- Climate change in Australia § Water
- Irrigation in Australia
- Murray–Darling Cap
- Murray-Darling Basin
- Snowy Mountains Scheme
- Water data transfer format
- Water supply and sanitation in Australia
