= South East Queensland =

Region in southern Queensland, Australia

- Region
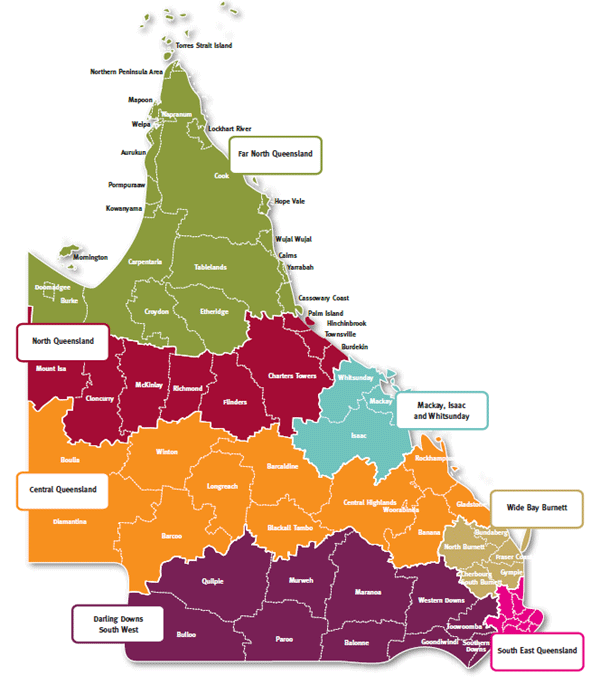
- Regions of Queensland with South East Queensland in the bottom right hand corner of the state
- Country: Australia
- State: Queensland
- LGA: City of Brisbane, City of Gold Coast, Somerset Region, Sunshine Coast Region, City of Moreton Bay, Redland City, Logan City, Shire of Noosa, Scenic Rim Region, City of Ipswich, Lockyer Valley Region, Toowoomba Region
- Established: 1824

Area
  - Total: 35,248 km^{2} (13,609 sq mi)

Population
  - Total: 4,000,000 (2024)
  - Density: 113/km^{2} (290/sq mi)
Regions around South East Queensland
Darling Downs	Wide Bay–Burnett	South Pacific Ocean
Darling Downs	South East Queensland	South Pacific Ocean
Darling Downs	New South Wales North Coast	South Pacific Ocean

South East Queensland (SEQ) is a bio-geographical, metropolitan and statistical region in the state of Queensland, Australia, with a population of approximately 4.0 million out of the state's total population of 5.5 million. The area covered by South East Queensland varies, depending on the definition of the region, though it tends to include Queensland's three largest cities: the capital city of Brisbane, the Gold Coast, and the Sunshine Coast. Its most common uses are for political and sociological purposes, and covers 35,248 square kilometres (13,609 sq mi) and incorporates 11 local government areas, extending 240 kilometres (150 mi) from Noosa in the north to the Gold Coast and New South Wales border in the south (some sources include Tweed Heads, which is contiguous as a conurbation with Brisbane/Gold Coast), and 140 kilometres (87 mi) west to Toowoomba (which is also considered part of the Darling Downs region). It is the third-largest urban area in Australia by population.

South East Queensland was the first part of Queensland to be settled and explored by Europeans. Settlements initially arose in the Brisbane and Ipswich areas with activity by European immigrants spreading in all directions from there. Various industries such as timber cutting and agriculture quickly developed at locations around the region from the 1840s onwards. Transport links have been shaped by the range of terrain found in South East Queensland.

The economy of South East Queensland supports and relies on a wide diversity of agricultural manufacturing industries, commerce and tourism. The region has an integrated public transport system, Translink. The gross domestic product is $170 billion.

== Definitions ==
The term South East Queensland has no equivalent political representation. The area covers many lower house seats at the federal and state levels. As Queensland has no upper house, there are no Legislative Council provinces or regions to bear the name either.

South Eastern Queensland, as an interim Australian bioregion, comprises 7,804,921 hectares (19,286,380 acres) and includes the Moreton Basin, South Burnett, and the Scenic Rim along with ten other biogeographic subregions. It extends as far north as Gladstone, and south into north-eastern New South Wales.

== History ==
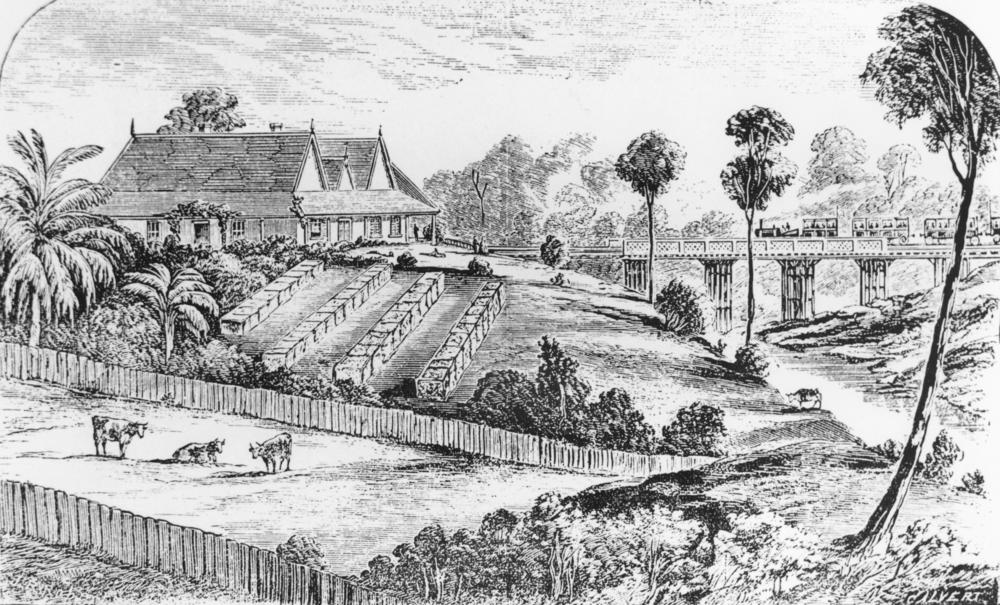
Queensland's first railway linked Grandchester to Ipswich, 1865

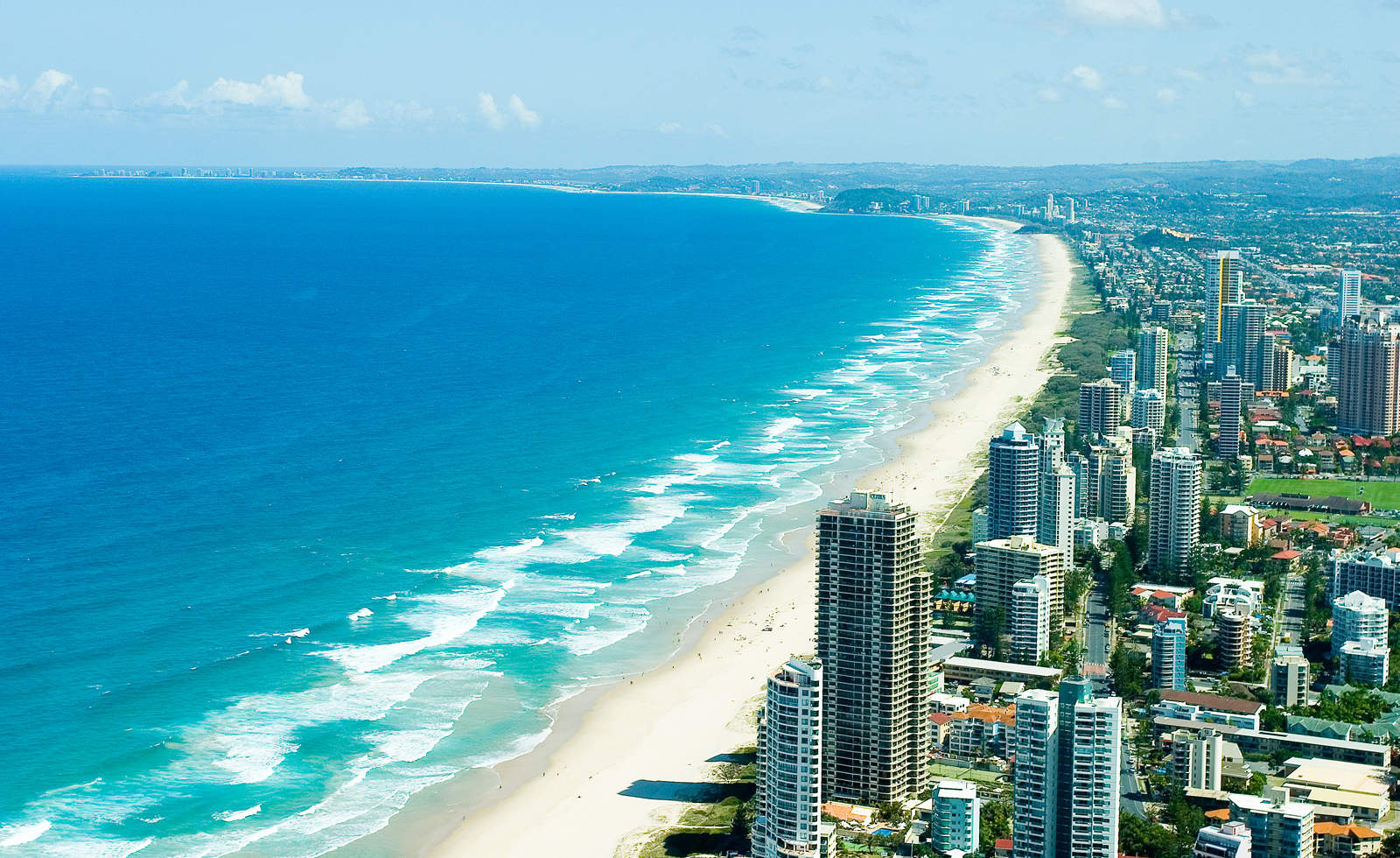
Gold Coast high rise and beaches, 2007

South East Queensland was home to around 20,000 Aboriginals prior to British occupation. The local tribes of the area were the Yugarapul of the Central Brisbane area; the Yugambeh people whose traditional lands ranged from South of the Logan River, down to the Tweed River and west to the McPherson Ranges; the Quandamooka people whose traditional lands encompassed the Moreton Bay Islands to the mouth of the Brisbane River to Tingalpa and south to the Logan River; and the Gubbi Gubbi people whose traditional lands were known to exist north of the Pine River, to Burrum River in the north, and west to the Conondale Range. According to history researchers the Aboriginal population declined to around 10,000 over the next 60 years.

Early explorers in the area including Matthew Flinders, Allan Cunningham, John Oxley and Patrick Logan. Around 1839, European settlers were able to move into the region. Logging was the first industry to develop. The first railway built in Queensland linked Grandchester to Ipswich in 1865 along a narrow 1067 mm gauge.

South East Queensland became the scene of war against the coalition of Aboriginal tribes from 1843 to 1855.

Major floods were experienced in 1893, 1974, 2011 and 2022. In 2005, the region suffered its worst drought in recorded history. A rare tropical cyclone called Alfred threatened the region in March 2025.

== Geography ==
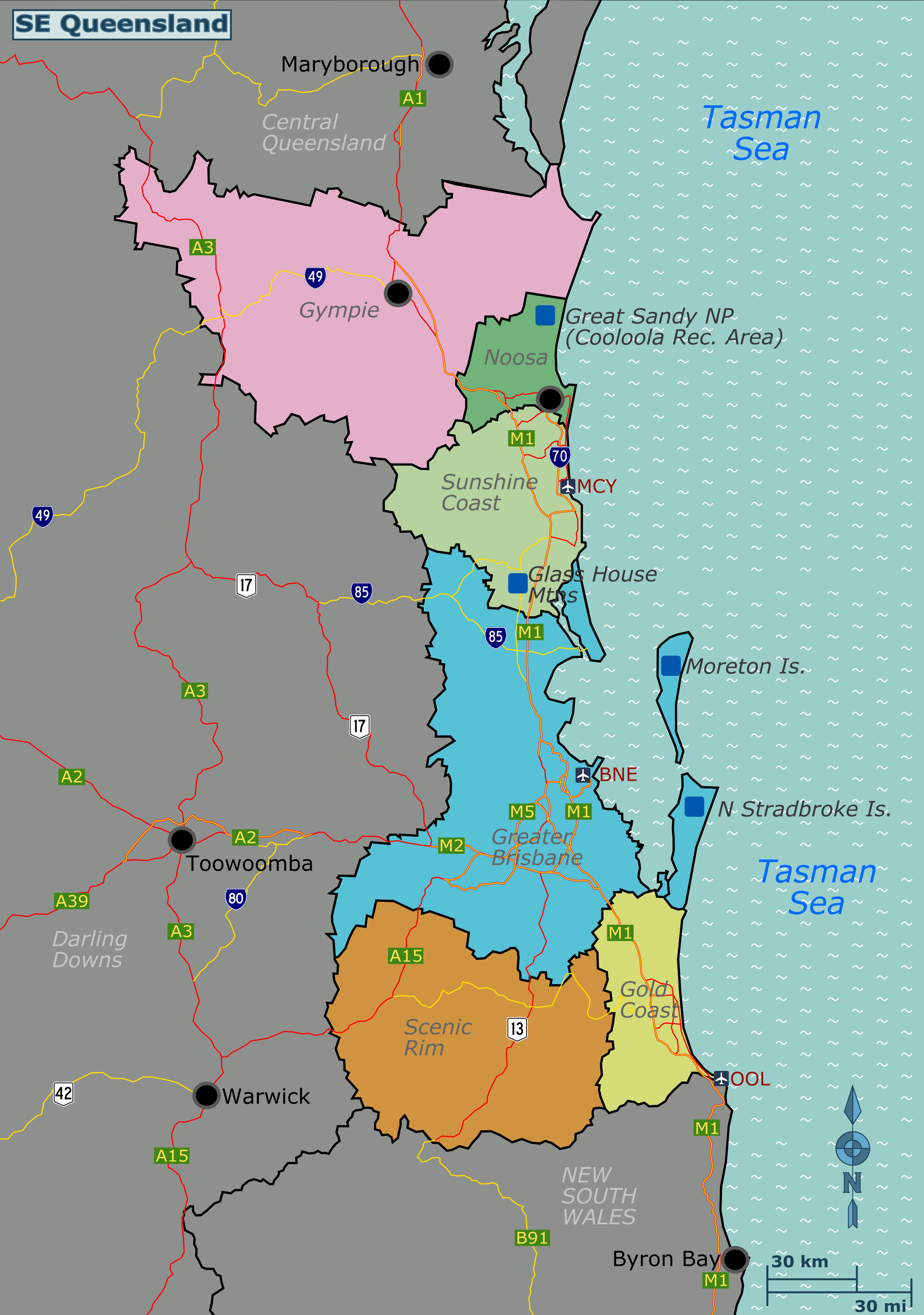
Travel map of South-East Queensland

Queensland's fifth highest peak, Mount Superbus, is located in the south of the region. The Cunningham Highway passes southwest to the Darling Downs via Cunninghams Gap. Several highways including the Bruce Highway, Warrego Highway and the Pacific Motorway link to the adjoining regions.

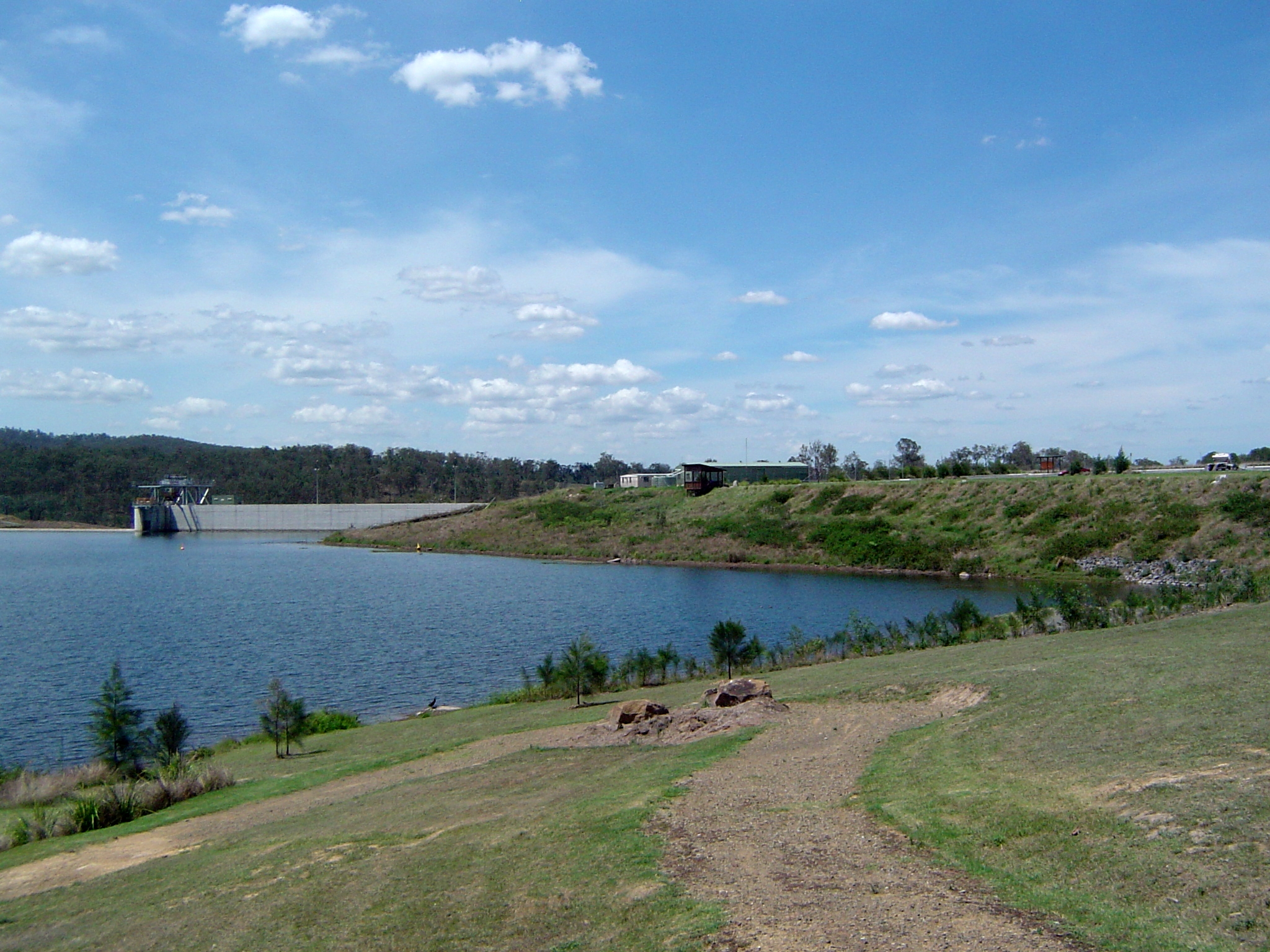
Wyaralong Dam was opened in 2011

The region is mountainous. McPherson Range, Teviot Range, D'Aguilar Range, Little Liverpool Range, Blackall Range as well as the Springbrook Plateau and Tamborine Mountain Plateau. Isolated volcanic peaks are found at Moogerah Peaks and the Glass House Mountains. Along the coast are several large islands including Bribie Island, Moreton Island and North Stradbroke Island with many smaller islands in Moreton Bay. Several major water supply and flood mitigation dams have been constructed here. The SEQ Water Grid, Western Corridor Recycled Water Scheme and Gold Coast Desalination Plant were built to counter the effects of drought in South East Queensland. Just over half the land is used for grazing. South East Queensland is flood-prone. The coastal dunes of South East Queensland represent one of the world's oldest, largest and continuous systems of coastal dunes.

=== Local government areas ===
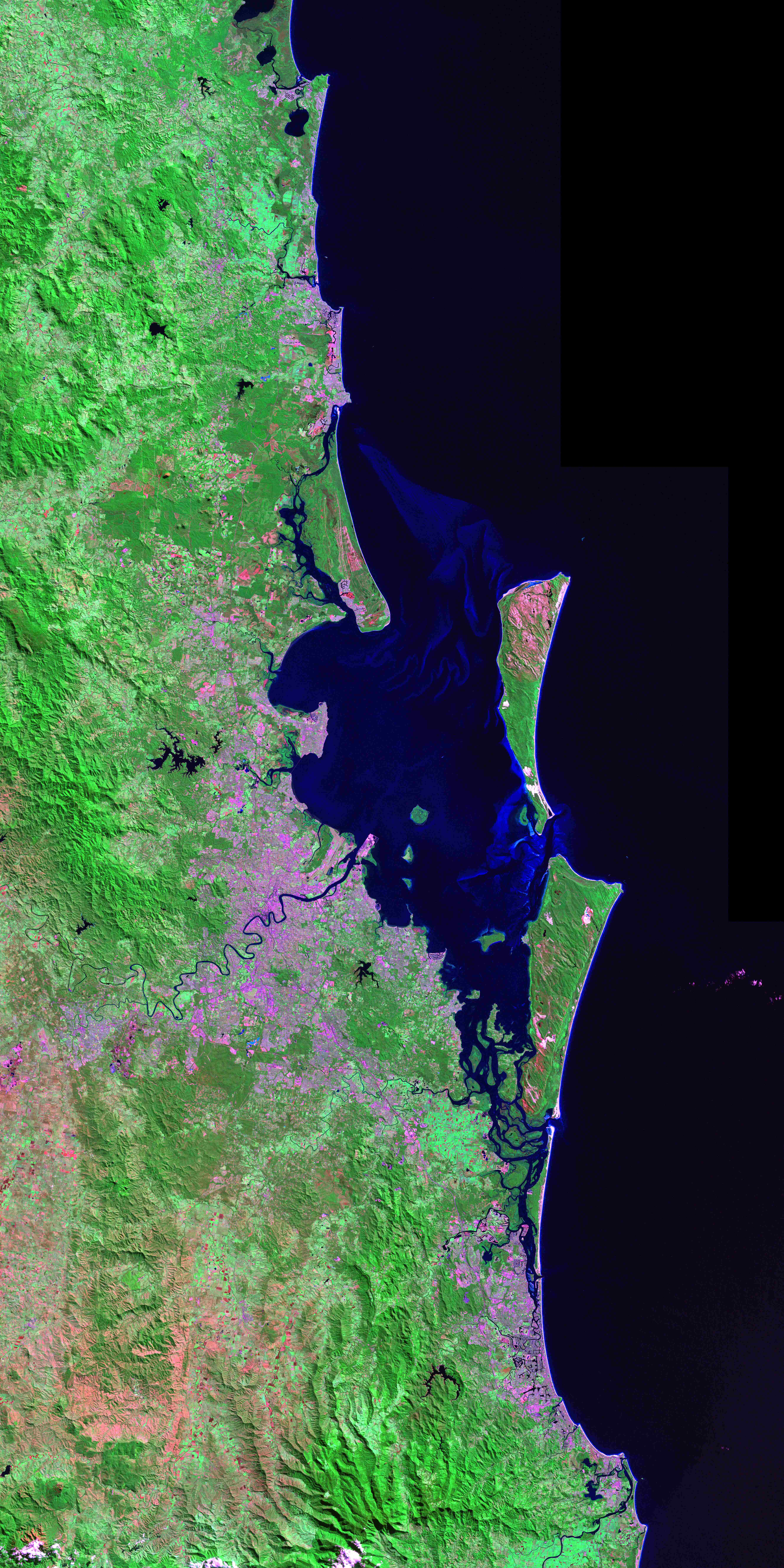
South-East Queensland from the Landsat 7 satellite

South East Queensland includes 11 adjoining local government areas (LGAs) in their entirety, and one partially (urban extent of the Toowoomba Region).

Local government area	Subcategory	Population (2018)	Area km^{2}	Density per km^{2}
City of Brisbane	Greater Brisbane	1,231,605	1,343	917
City of Moreton Bay	Greater Brisbane	459,585	2,042	225
City of Logan	Greater Brisbane	326,615	958	341
City of Ipswich	Greater Brisbane	213,638	1,094	195
Redland City	Greater Brisbane	156,863	537	292
Scenic Rim Region	—N/a	42,583	4,243	10
Somerset Region	—N/a	25,887	5,373	5
Lockyer Valley Region	—N/a	41,011	2,269	18
City of Gold Coast	—N/a	606,774	1,334	455
Sunshine Coast Region	—N/a	319,922	2,254	142
Toowoomba Region (urban extent)	—N/a	170,356	12,957	13
Shire of Noosa	—N/a	55,369	870	63

=== Major cities ===
The region is a complex, regional hybrid linking the Brisbane metropolitan area with several surrounding cities. South East Queensland includes the following cities:

- Brisbane, Queensland's capital and largest city. Brisbane's metropolitan area includes the following local government areas:
  - City of Brisbane, the most populous local government area in the nation
  - City of Ipswich, home to Queensland's oldest provincial city and industrial centre, in the south-west
  - City of Logan, a largely residential and light industrial area in the south-east
  - City of Moreton Bay, a largely residential area to the north, which includes the Redcliffe Peninsula
  - Redland City, a residential and acreage area in the coastal south-east
- Gold Coast, Queensland's premier tourist destination and surfing mecca to the south of Brisbane.
- Sunshine Coast, another major tourist area to the north of Brisbane.
- Toowoomba, nicknamed 'The Garden City', the most populous inland city in the country after the national capital, Canberra.

New developments are currently underway at Springfield, Ecco Ripley, Yarrabilba and Flagstone. Some geographers suggest several more master-planned communities will be needed to cater for the expected population growth rates.

=== Airports ===
- Brisbane Airport – The major international gateway to the region offering services direct to North America, Asia, Oceania and the Middle East.
- Gold Coast Airport – The second major gateway is one of Australia's fastest growing airport offering services to New Zealand, and Indonesia.
- Sunshine Coast Airport – An airport offering services to Sydney, Melbourne and Adelaide, with international flights to New Zealand during the peak summer season.
- Toowoomba Wellcamp Airport – The first privately funded major airport in the country. Services the Toowoomba and surrounding Darling Downs region, with a view to becoming a major international freight hub.
- Archerfield Airport – a general aviation airport located approximately 11 kilometres (6.8 mi) south of the Brisbane CBD.
- Redcliffe Airport – a general aviation airport located on the Redcliffe Peninsula approximately 28 kilometres (17 mi) from the Brisbane CBD.
- RAAF Base Amberley – the largest operational base of the air force in Australia located in south-western Ipswich approximately 50 kilometres (31 mi) from the Brisbane CBD.

== Industry ==
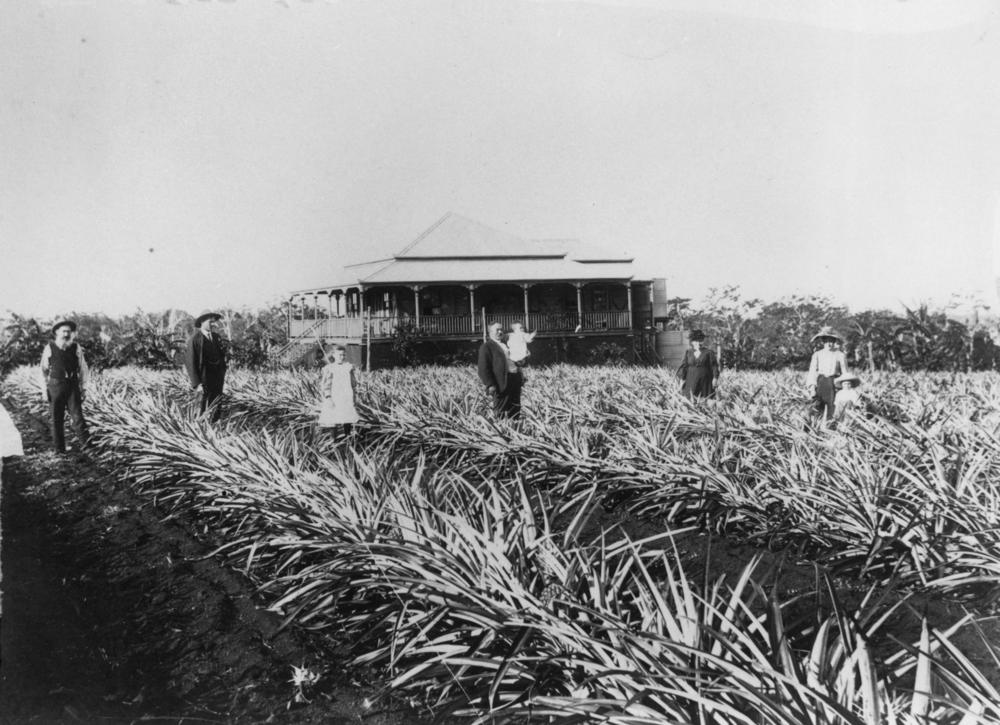
Pineapple plantation at Cleveland, 1907

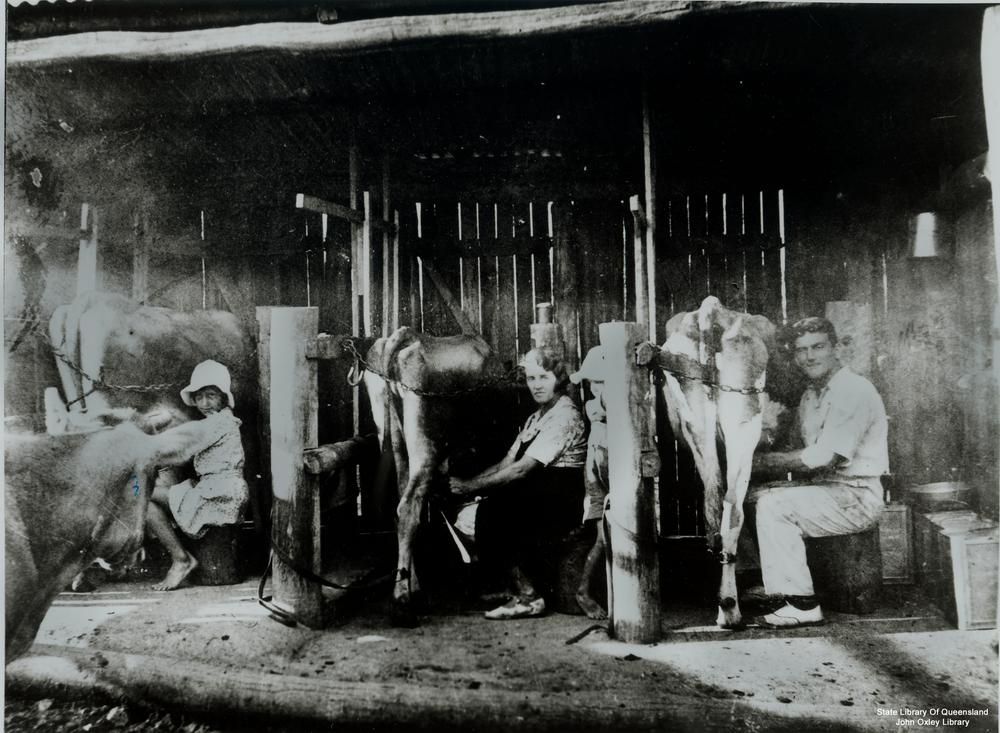
Milking cows at Mount Maroon, 1935

The region exports a number of crop products including broccoli, onion, Chinese cabbage, sweet corn and celery. A sizeable vegetable industry is established in the Lockyer Valley. Timber cutting, mining and a range of agricultural pursuits including dairying were once prominent in South East Queensland. Tourism, in part due to Brisbane serving as major transport and export hub and destinations such as the Gold Coast and the availability of land for industry, has grown in recent decades together with specialised skills in professional services and manufacturing.

Car dependency has a risen when the location of jobs in areas such as health and education are at distance from where the majority live. Road transport in Brisbane relies on the car as the dominant form of transport.

== Demographics ==
As of 2014, the population of South East Queensland is estimated to be approximately 3.4 million, meaning that between one in six and one in seven Australians call the region home. The regional population is heavily urbanised and concentrated along the coast. The three largest population centres of Brisbane, Gold Coast and the Sunshine Coast account for 90 per cent of the region's population. In the year to June 2020, the City of Ipswich was the fastest growing local government area in Queensland.

=== Immigration and population growth ===
South East Queensland is one of the fastest-growing regions in Australia. Growth in the state is fuelled principally by migration from the southern states and overseas. In 2010, South East Queensland's population grew by an average of about 1,200 new residents each week.

Between 1991 and 2016, the population rose from 1.9 million residents to 3.3 million. South East Queensland is expected to be home to 4.4 million by 2031. A 2010 report concluded that the region will reach 5.5 million people by 2051.

The population growth rate in SEQ was more than twice the rate of the rest of Queensland over the past two decades. More than 80% of population growth in the state between 1999-2019 occurred in SEQ.

Population growth was putting pressure on schools and hospitals in the region in 2021.

=== Regional planning ===
South East Queensland's future development will be heavily based on the South East Queensland Regional Plan, released by the Queensland state government in 2005. The regional plan covers the period from 2009–2031 and focuses on slowing development along the coast, in order to prevent creating a 200 km city, and instead aim for growth in the west, in particular around Springfield and Beaudesert. Infrastructure planning in South East Queensland is almost exclusively designed to facilitate trans-metropolitan travel and reduce traffic congestion.

The region's big picture planning document was updated for the third time in 2017 with the release of South East Queensland Regional Plan, Shaping SEQ. Shaping SEQ was reviewed in 2023 because of rapid population growth in South East Queensland.

== Environment ==
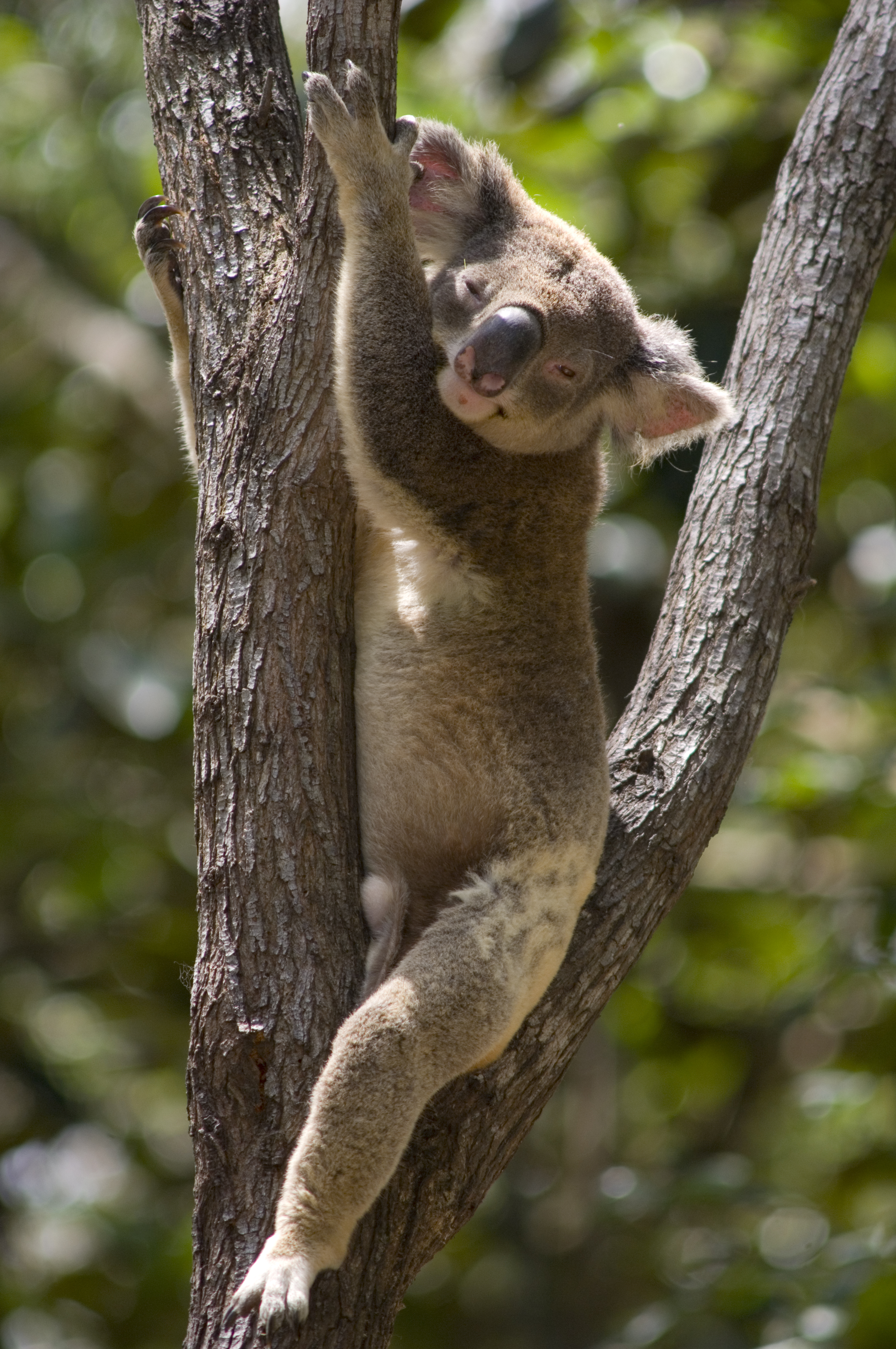
Brisbane Koala Bushlands at Burbank, 2008

Predominantly rural landscapes lie to the west of the urbanised coastal centres. The Lockyer Valley, a major agricultural area referred to as "South East Queensland's Salad Bowl", lies outside Brisbane. Many World Heritage listed rainforests are located along the region's southern border ranges, an area known as the Scenic Rim, such as Lamington National Park and Main Range National Park.

Within the region, the koala is listed as vulnerable. In 2025, the region was estimated to have 16,000 koalas in the wild. In South East Queensland the koala is threatened by habitat loss, disease such as chlamydiosis and increased mortality due to domestic animals and motor vehicles. The Australian Koala Foundation says the animal is threatened by mining and land development. Numbers in Redland City have seen a dramatic decline in recent years. The state government launched the Koala Conservation Plan in 2006. The plan involved the rehabilitation of cleared areas, domestic dogs containment and koala signage. Another initiative was launched in 2010 to protect and rehabilitate koala habitats by tree planting and the construction of koala friendly fencing.

According to the Intergovernmental Panel on Climate Change SEQ is one of Australia's regions most vulnerable to climate change. After many years of water restrictions due to severe drought, the Government of Queensland lifted restrictions across the whole of South East Queensland on 1 January 2013.

A fire ant outbreak is underway in South East Queensland. In 2022, 60 new suburbs around Brisbane, Moreton Bay, and the Scenic Rim were added to the biosecurity zone as part of a national fire ant eradication program.

== Attractions ==
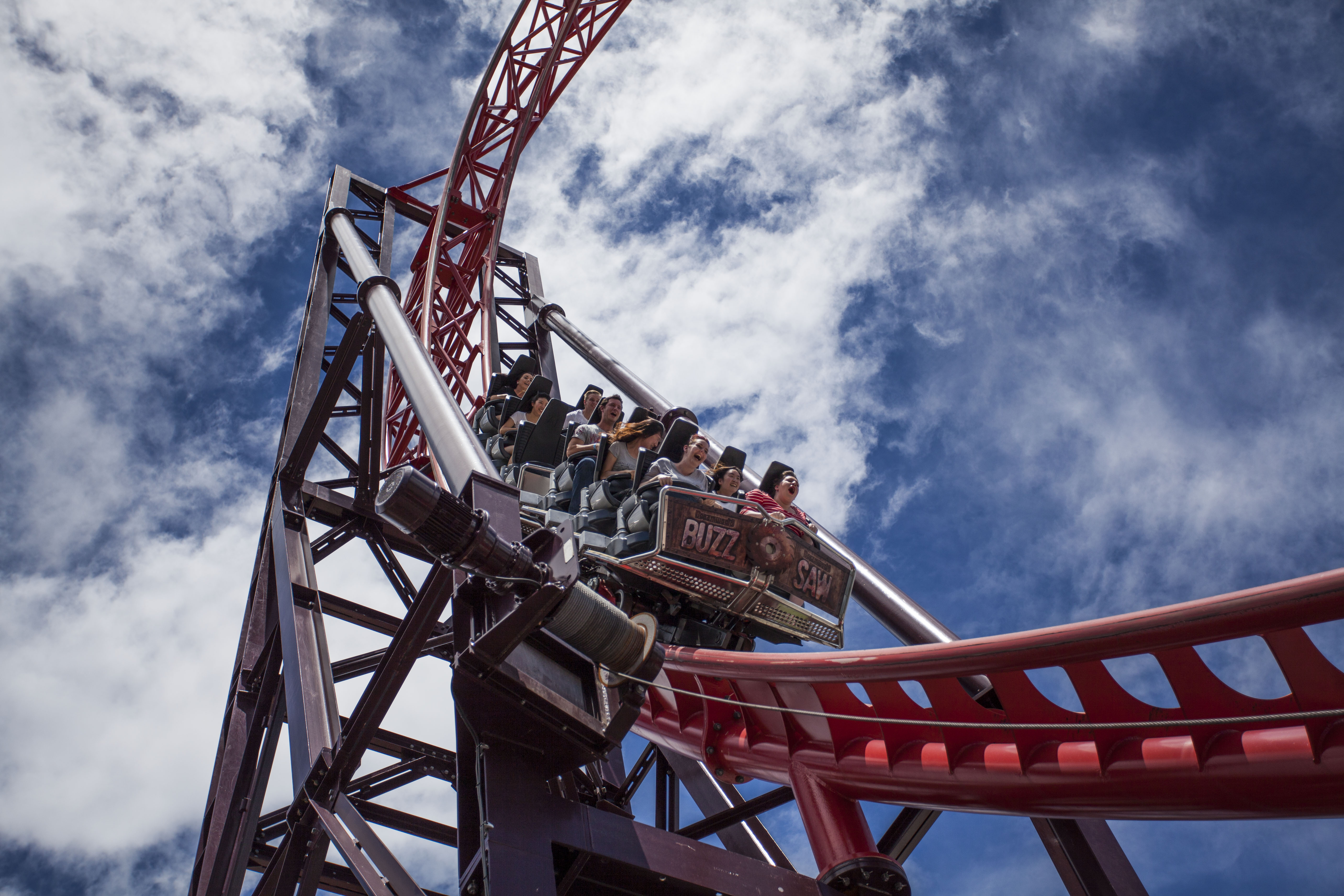
BuzzSaw roller coaster at Dreamworld, 2013

The region features several major theme parks, including the largest in the country, Dreamworld at Coomera. WhiteWater World is next door and in nearby Oxenford is Warner Bros. Movie World. Sea World is located at Main Beach and opened in 1971. Lone Pine Koala Sanctuary was established in 1927 at Fig Tree Pocket. David Fleay Wildlife Park is at Tallebudgera and Currumbin Wildlife Sanctuary was founded in 1947 at Currumbin. Australia Zoo was established in 1970.

Q1 at Surfers Paradise is the tallest building in Australia. Brisbane Skytower, the sixth tallest building in Australia, is located in Brisbane. A casino is located at Queen's Wharf and another called The Star Gold Coast is located at Broadbeach.

The Ekka was established in 1876. Riverfire began in 1998.

== See also ==
- Australian rules football in South East Queensland
- Daylight Saving for South East Queensland
- Railways in South East Queensland
- Shopping Centres in South East Queensland
