= Environment of Australia =

Relief map showing major rivers of Australia

Climate of Australia

The Australian environment ranges from virtually pristine Antarctic territory and rainforests to degraded industrial areas of major cities. Forty distinct ecoregions have been identified across the Australian mainland and islands. Central Australia has a very dry climate. The interior has a number of deserts while most of the coastal areas are populated. Northern Australia experiences tropical cyclones while much of the country is prone to periodic drought. This dry and warm environment and exposure to cyclones, makes Australia particularly vulnerable to climate change—with some areas already experiencing increases in wildfires and fragile ecosystems.

The island ecology of Australia has led to a number of unique endemic plant and animal species, notably marsupials like the kangaroo and koala. Agriculture and mining are predominant land uses which cause negative impacts on many different ecosystems. The management of the impact on the environment from the mining industry, the protection of the Great Barrier Reef, forests and native animals are recurring issues of conservation.

The protected areas in Australia are important sources of ecotourism, with sites like the Great Barrier Reef and World Heritage sites like Tasmanian Wilderness World Heritage Area or the Uluṟu-Kata Tjuṯa National Park draw both national and international tourism. Clean Up Australia Day was an initiative developed in 1989 to collaboratively clean up local areas and is held on the first Sunday of autumn (in March).

In Australia forest cover is around 17% of the total land area, equivalent to 134,005,100 hectares (ha) of forest in 2020, up from 133,882,200 hectares (ha) in 1990. In 2020, naturally regenerating forest covered 131,614,800 hectares (ha) and planted forest covered 2,390,300 hectares (ha). Of the naturally regenerating forest 0% was reported to be primary forest (consisting of native tree species with no clearly visible indications of human activity) and around 18% of the forest area was found within protected areas. For the year 2015, 67% of the forest area was reported to be under public ownership, 32% private ownership and 1% with ownership listed as other or unknown.

== Protected areas ==
Protected areas cover 895,288 km^{2} of Australia's land area, or about 11.5% of the total land area. Of these, two-thirds are considered strictly protected (IUCN categories I to IV), and the rest is mostly managed resources protected area (IUCN category VI). There are also 200 marine protected areas, which cover a further 64.8 million hectares. Indigenous Protected Area have been established since the 1990s, the largest of which covers part of the Tanami Desert in the Northern Territory.

The protected natural areas include world heritage listed properties, such as the Australian Fossil Mammal Sites (Riversleigh/Naracoorte), Central Eastern Rainforest Reserves, Fraser Island, Great Barrier Reef, Greater Blue Mountains Area, Heard and McDonald Islands, Lord Howe Island, Macquarie Island, Purnululu National Park, Shark Bay, and the Wet Tropics of Queensland.

Protected mixed World Heritage listed areas include Tasmanian Wilderness, Uluṟu-Kata Tjuṯa National Park, Willandra Lakes Region and Kakadu National Park. Ningaloo Reef and Cape Range peninsula are submitted and on the Tentative List for World Heritage listing and are Australian National Parks.

== Conservation ==
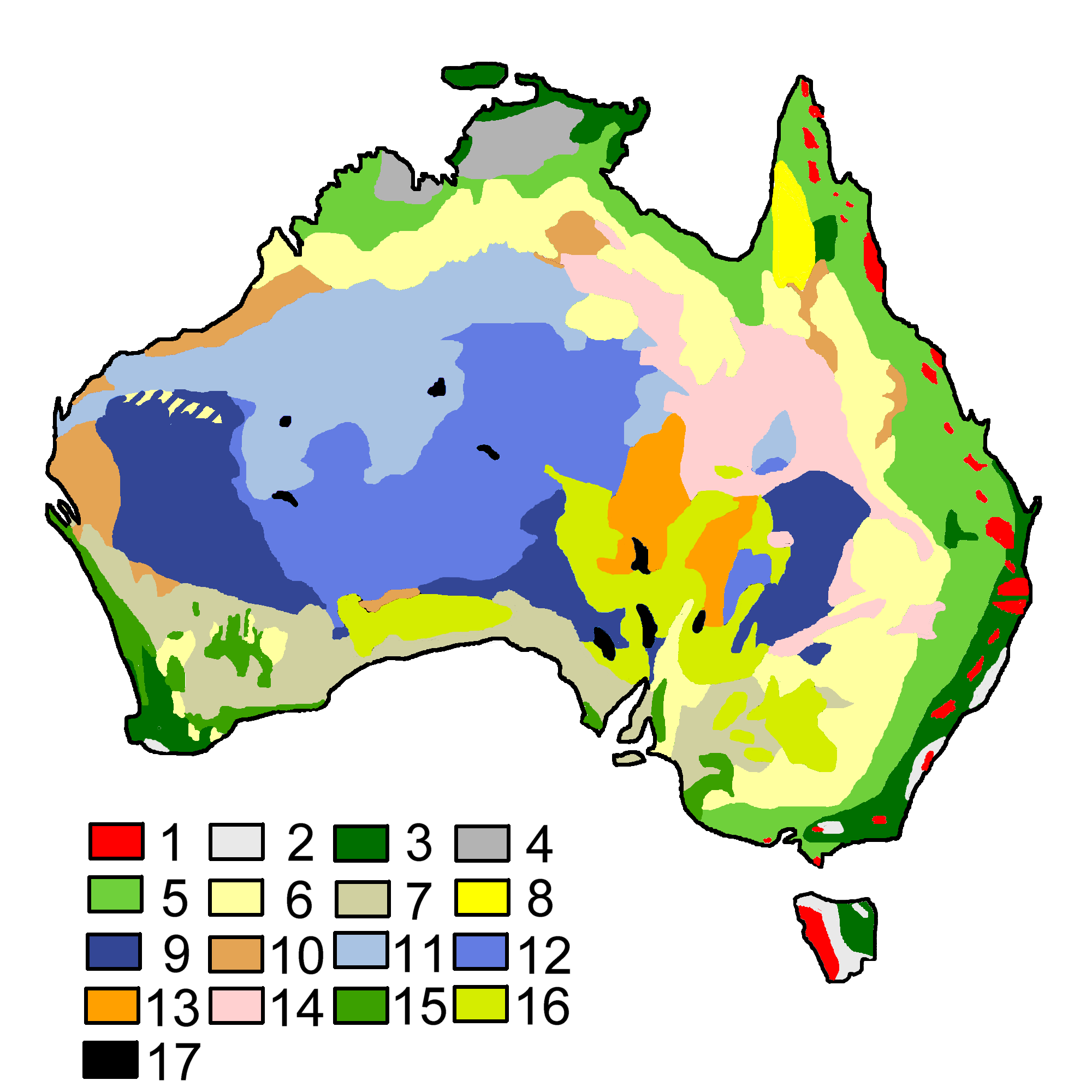
Map of Australian vegetation

Although most of Australia is semi-arid or desert, it covers a diverse range of habitats, from alpine heaths to tropical rainforests, and is recognised as a megadiverse country. Because of the great age and consequent low levels of fertility of the continent, its extremely variable weather patterns, and its long-term geographic isolation, much of Australia's biota is unique and diverse. About 85% of flowering plants, 84% of mammals, more than 45% of birds, and 89% of in-shore, temperate-zone fish are endemic. Many of Australia's ecoregions, and the species within those regions, are threatened by human activities and introduced plant and animal species. The federal Environment Protection and Biodiversity Conservation Act 1999 is a legal framework for the protection of threatened species. Numerous protected areas have been created under the national Biodiversity Action Plan to protect and preserve unique ecosystems; 65 wetlands are listed under the Ramsar Convention, and 16 World Heritage Sites have been established. Australia was ranked 13th in the world on the 2005 Environmental Sustainability Index.

Most Australian woody plant species are evergreen and many are adapted to fire and drought, including many eucalyptus and acacias. Australia has a rich variety of endemic legume species that thrive in nutrient-poor soils because of their symbiosis with Rhizobia bacteria and mycorrhizal fungi. Well-known Australian fauna include monotremes (the platypus and echidna); a host of marsupials, including the kangaroo, koala, wombat; and birds such as the emu and kookaburra. The dingo was introduced by Austronesian people who traded with Indigenous Australians around 3000 BCE. Many plant and animal species became extinct soon after first human settlement, including the Australian megafauna; others have become extinct since European settlement, among them the thylacine.

== Water ==
Australia is the second driest continent (after Antarctica), and frequent droughts have led to the introduction of water restrictions in all parts of Australia. This has led to concern about water security in Australia by environmentalists, irrigators and state and federal governments. Diversion and capture of natural water flows for irrigation in Australia has been responsible for dramatic changes in environmental water flows, particularly in the Murray–Darling basin. The major part of Snowy River flows was diverted by the Snowy Mountains Scheme.

Australia's urban areas use wastewater treatment plants. Both stormwater and treated sewerage flow into rivers, estuaries, nearshore waters and beaches.

=== Water supply ===
Water supply and sanitation in Australia is a topic concerning the consumption and obtainment of water for the Australian population. Being the driest inhabited continent in the world, and also one of the highest consumers of water per capita, both the acquisition and usage of water are of concern to Australians. Issues such as climate change and global warming are expected to impact the supply of water in Australia in the future, which can lead to severe consequences such as prolonged droughts.

Historically, Australia's variable rainfall levels have caused the construction of various dams and reservoirs in major water systems, to ensure that a consistent water supply exists for its population. The Murray-Darling river, Australia's largest river by capacity, supplies 55% of the total water usage in Australia, and is primarily used for agriculture in South Australia, New South Wales, and Victoria. Other prominent water sources have included groundwater, desalinated marine water, and recycled water.

The government management of water supply and distribution are a responsibility of each state government. State-owned companies are in charge of service provision in Western Australia, South Australia and the Northern Territory, while utilities owned by local governments provide services in parts of Queensland and Tasmania. In Victoria, New South Wales and Southeast Queensland, state-owned utilities provide bulk water which is then distributed by utilities owned by either local or state governments. The Minister for Water is responsible for water policies at the federal level.

Restrictions on water usage have been implemented at various points in Australia's history, in response to widespread droughts. Policies involve the prohibition of water usage for non-essential purposes, such as sprinklers and car washing. In less urgent times, residents are still encouraged to conserve water and apply practices such as effluent reuse, rainwater harvesting and using greywater for various applicable purposes. Larger scale projects in wastewater reclamation have been discussed in many major cities and successfully applied in Adelaide and Brisbane.

In 2006, Perth became the first Australian city to operate a seawater desalination plant, the Kwinana Desalination Plant, to reduce the city's vulnerability to droughts. Additional plants followed for major cities around Australia, such as

- Kurnell which supplies Sydney metropolitan area during droughts and low dam levels
- Gold Coast Desalination Plant supplying the Gold Coast and additionally the South East Queensland area by the SEQ Water Grid
- Victorian Desalination Plant supplying Melbourne metropolitan area.
- Adelaide Desalination Plant with capacity to supply up to 50% of Adelaide's water requirements.

== Issues ==
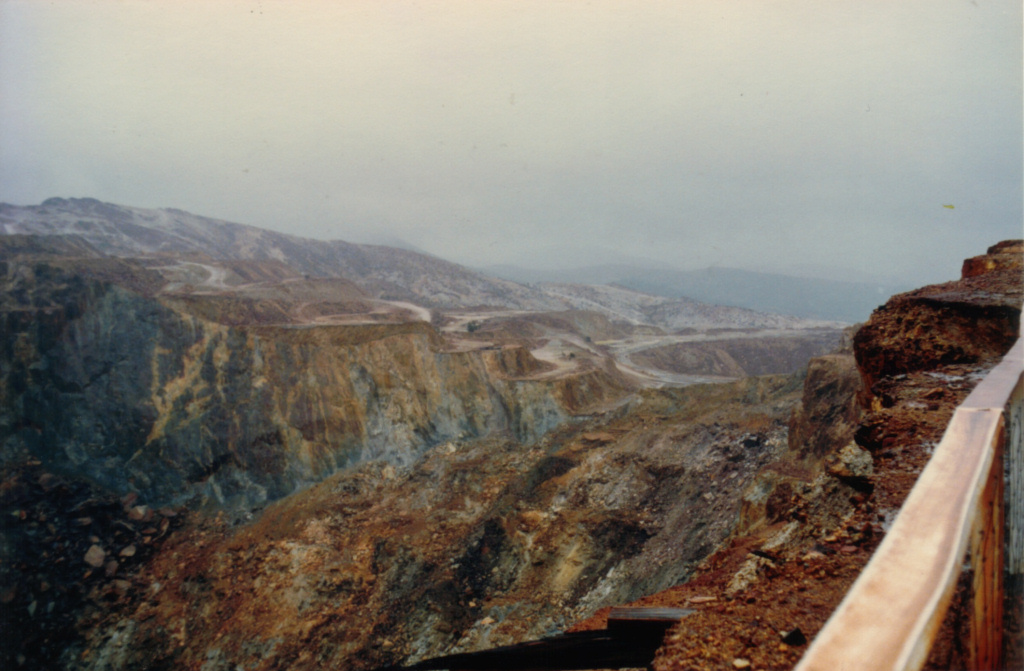
Mountains near Queenstown, Tasmania, completely denuded of vegetation through effects of mining

The environmental of Australia is in a "poor state and it is deteriorating in the face of amplifying threats". Major environmental issues in Australia include whaling, logging of old growth forest, irrigation and its impact on the Murray River, Darling River and Macquarie Marshes, acid sulfate soils, soil salinity, land clearing, soil erosion, uranium mining, nuclear waste, the creation of marine reserves, air quality in major cities and around polluting industries and infrastructure, pesticide and herbicide impacts and growing of genetically modified food.

There is also a large savana called the great Australian savana.

Increased coal mining in Australia is contentious because of the effects of global warming on Australia, emissions to air from coal burning power stations, dust, subsidence, impact on rivers like the Hunter River and other water users, failure to adequately restore mined areas, and lack of sustainability. As an example, in 1999 Australia's energy consumption of coal and coal products was 47,364 thousand metric tons oil equivalent, compared to that of the world's energy consumption of coal and coal products which totalled 2,278,524 (also measured in thousand metric tons oil equivalent).

Climate change and global warming are of particular concern because of the likely effects of global warming on agriculture, the Great Barrier Reef and tourism industry, human health through mosquito-borne crydiologicyticlogy. Sea level rise could also have a profound impact on low-levelled and poorer communities and waterfront suburbs. The range of rises forecast by the IPCC Fourth Assessment Report would be sufficient to have impacts in many areas, and if the Greenland ice cap melts faster than forecast, it could have a disastrous impact.

In urban areas, noise and odour are major sources of complaints to environmental protection authorities.

== Climate change ==
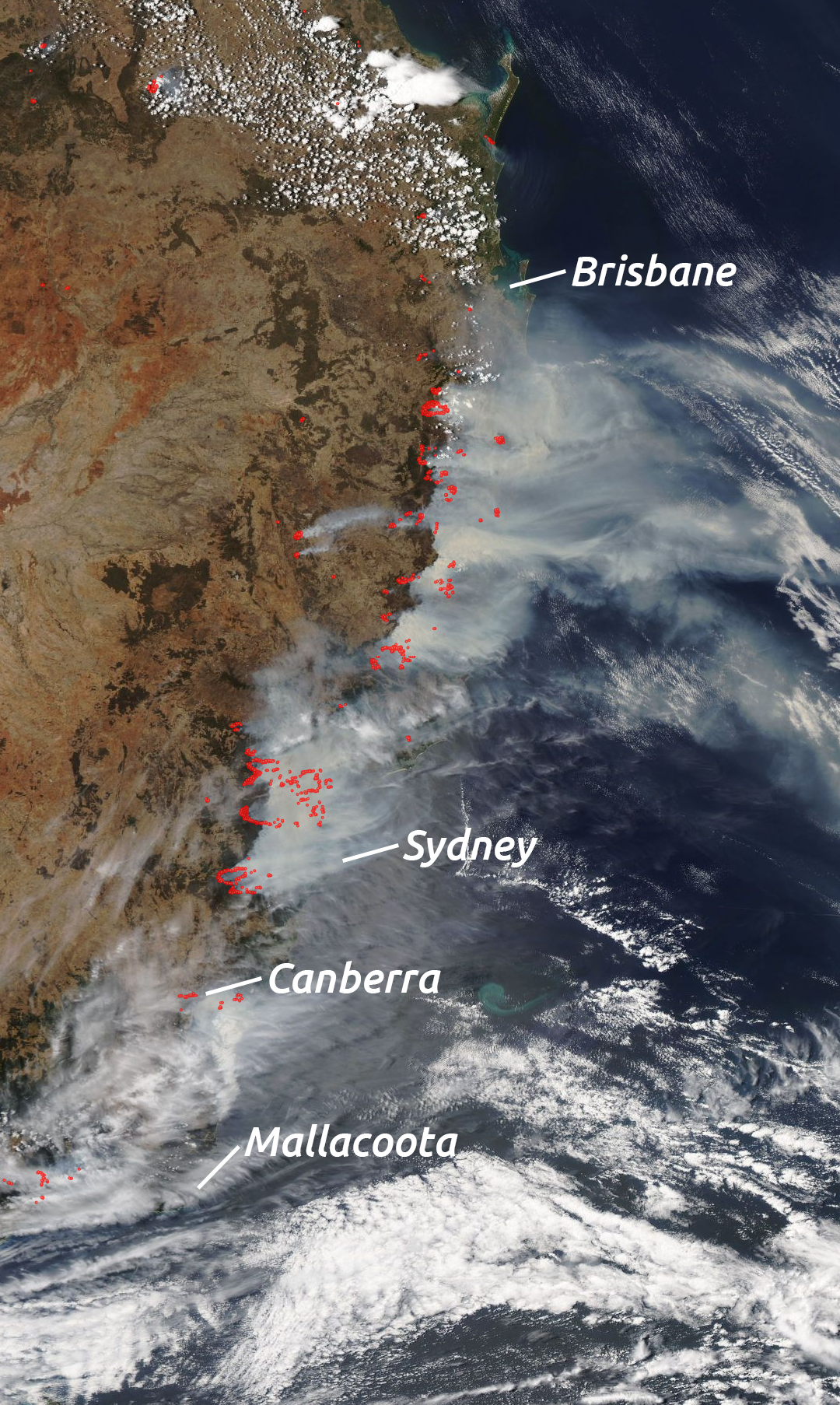
Climate change is increasing the frequency and size of bushfires, as evidenced by the 2019–20 Australian bushfire season.

Climate change has been a critical issue in Australia since the beginning of the 21st century. Australia is becoming hotter and more prone to extreme heat, bushfires, droughts, floods, and longer fire seasons because of climate change. Climate issues include wildfires, heatwaves, cyclones, rising sea levels, and erosion.

Since the beginning of the 20th century, Australia has experienced an increase of over 1.5 °C in average annual temperatures, with warming occurring at twice the rate over the past 50 years compared with the previous 50 years. In 2025, the Australian Government reported "high confidence" that the global temperature rise "will stabilise some" at the increase of 1.5-3 °C. Recent climate events such as extremely high temperatures and widespread drought have focused government and public attention on the effects of climate change in Australia. Rainfall in southwestern Australia has decreased by 10–20% since the 1970s, while southeastern Australia has also experienced a moderate decline since the 1990s. Rainfall is expected to become heavier and more infrequent, as well as more common in summer rather than in winter. Australia's annual average temperatures are projected to increase 0.4–2.0 °C above 1990 levels by the year 2030, and 1–6 °C by 2070. Average precipitation in the southwest and southeast Australia is projected to decline during this time, while regions such as the northwest may experience increases in rainfall.

Climate change is affecting the continent's environment and ecosystems. Australia is vulnerable to the effects of global warming projected for the next 50 to 100 years because of its extensive arid and semi-arid areas, already warm climate, and high annual rainfall variability. The continent's high fire risk increases this susceptibility to changes in temperature and climate. Meanwhile, Australia's coastlines will experience erosion and inundation from an estimated 8–88 centimetres (3.1–34.6 in) increase in global sea level. Australia's unique ecosystems such as the Great Barrier Reef and many animal species are also at risk.

Climate change also has diverse implications for Australia's economy, its agriculture and public health. Projected impacts include more severe floods, droughts, and cyclones. Furthermore, Australia's population is highly concentrated in coastal areas at risk from rising sea levels, and existing pressures on water supply will be exacerbated. The exposure of Indigenous Australians to climate change impacts is exacerbated by existing socio-economic disadvantages which are linked to colonial and post-colonial marginalisation. The communities most affected by climate changes are those in the North where Aboriginal and Torres Strait Islander people make up 30% of the population. Aboriginal and Torres Strait Islander communities located in the coastal north are the most disadvantaged due to social and economic issues and their reliance on traditional land for food, culture, and health. This has raised the question for many community members in these areas, "Should we stay or move away?"

Australia is also a contributor to climate change, with its greenhouse gas emissions per capita above the world average. The country is highly reliant on coal and other fossil fuels, although renewable energy coverage is increasing. National climate change mitigation efforts include a commitment to achieving net zero emissions by 2050 under the Paris Agreement, although Australia has repeatedly ranked poorly in the Climate Change Performance Index and other international rankings for its climate targets and implementation. Climate change adaptation can be performed at national and local levels and was identified as a priority for Australia in the 2007 Garnaut Review.

Climate change has been a divisive or politicised issue in Australian politics since the 2000s, contributing to successive governments implementing and repealing mitigation policies such as carbon pricing. Some Australian media outlets have promoted climate misinformation. The issue has sparked protests in support of climate change policies, including some of the largest demonstrations and school strikes in Australia's history.

== State of the Environment reports ==
=== Commonwealth of Australia ===
The State of the Environment (SoE) section has responsibility for environmental reporting and implements two key interrelated initiatives: the State of the Environment report and the Essential Environmental Measures for Australia program.

State of the Environment report

The SoE section leads the development and production of the Australia: State of the Environment. The report is a comprehensive national assessment of the state of our environment produced every five years based on the best available evidence. It is tabled in accordance with section 516B of the Environment Protection and Biodiversity Conversation Act 1999, by the Minister for the Environment and Energy. The SoE report provides a vital resource for policy makers, industry and NGOs, educational institutions, the science community and the general public.

Essential Environmental Measures for Australia

The section also leads the development of the Essential Environmental Measures (EEM) program to strengthen environmental reporting. The EEM program aims to improve our capacity to track trends in the State of Australia's environment and engages with environmental experts to:

- identify measures that are essential for tracking change in the state of the environment and
- make measure-related data Findable, Accessible, Interoperable and Reusable (FAIR).

Over time, it is anticipated that information provided through the program will become a core component of the evidence used to inform national state of the environment reporting and environmental-economic accounting.

Sydney

- 2003
- 2006
- 2009

=== Victoria ===
The Victorian State of the Environment 2023 Report highlights several critical environmental issues in Victoria. Key findings include significant challenges related to biodiversity and climate change. The report shows that biodiversity is in decline, with 32 out of 42 biodiversity indicators either deteriorating or not assessed since 2018. Climate change remains a pressing issue, with most climate indicators showing worsening trends, though there has been a notable 27% reduction in net greenhouse gas emissions since 2018.

=== Western Australia ===
The southwest coastal area has a Mediterranean climate and was originally heavily forested, including large stands of the karri, one of the tallest trees in the world. This agricultural region of Western Australia is in the top nine terrestrial habitats for terrestrial biodiversity, with a higher proportion of endemic species than most other equivalent regions. Thanks to the offshore Leeuwin Current, the area numbers in the top six regions for marine biodiversity, containing the most southerly coral reefs in the world. Average annual rainfall varies from 300 millimetres (12 in) at the edge of the Wheatbelt region to 1,400 millimetres (55 in) in the wettest areas near Northcliffe, but in November to March, evaporation exceeds rainfall, and it is generally very dry. Plants must be adapted to this and the extreme poverty of all soils. A major reduction in winter rainfall has been observed since the mid-1970s, with more extreme rainfall events in the summer months. The central four-fifths of the state are semiarid or desert and are lightly inhabited, with mining being the only significant activity. Annual rainfall averages 200–250 millimetres (8–10 in), most of which occurs in sporadic torrential falls related to cyclone events in the summer months. An exception to this is the northern tropical regions. The Kimberley has a sweltering monsoonal climate with average annual rainfall ranging from 500 to 1,500 millimetres (20–60 in), but there is a very long, almost rainless season from April to November. Eighty-five percent of the state's runoff occurs in the Kimberley. Still, the only development has occurred along the Ord River, restricted elsewhere due to violent floods and the insurmountable poverty of the generally shallow soils.

The black swan is the state bird of Western Australia.

The red-and-green kangaroo paw is the floral emblem of Western Australia.

Snow in the state is rare and typically only in the Stirling Range near Albany, as it is the only mountain range far enough south and with sufficient elevation. More rarely, snow can fall on the nearby Porongurup Range. Snow outside these areas is a significant event; it usually occurs in hilly areas of southwestern Australia. The most widespread low-level snow occurred on 26 June 1956 when snow was reported in the Perth Hills, as far north as Wongan Hills and east as Salmon Gums. However, even in the Stirling Range, snowfalls rarely exceed 5 cm (2 in) and rarely settle for more than one day. The highest observed maximum temperature of 50.5 °C (122.9 °F) was recorded at Mardie Station on 19 February 1998. The lowest minimum temperature recorded was −7.2 °C (19.0 °F) at Eyre Bird Observatory on 17 August 2008.

=== Tasmania ===
Mild climate

=== Northern Territory ===
Low relative humidity, wind, and lack of rain range from hot and dry in the interior to the milder, wetter climates of the south.

== Environment organizations ==
- Australian Conservation Foundation
- Australian Network of Environmental Defenders Offices (ANEDO)
- Greenpeace Australia Pacific
- Sustainable Population Australia
- The Sunrise Project
- Trees for Life (Brooklyn Park)

== See also ==
- Climate change in Australia
- List of wettest known tropical cyclones in Australia
- List of Australian environmental books
- Ecology of Melbourne
- Ecology of Sydney
- Waste management in Australia
