= Paul Stein (judge) =

Australian judge (1939–2024)

The Honourable Paul Stein AM KC

Judge of the New South Wales Court of Appeal
- In office 8 April 1997 – 11 April 2003

Personal details
- Born: 4 January 1939
- Died: 22 June 2024 (aged 85)
- Occupation: Jurist, barrister

Paul Leon Stein AM KC (4 January 1939 – 22 June 2024) was an Australian lawyer and judge, and an authority on environmental law.

== Early years and education ==
Stein was born in London, England, on 4 January 1939. His parents were Hyman (Harry) Stein (1910–1980) and Sarah (Sadie) Stein née Henry (1908–1996); they had four children. Hyman Stein was a jazz musician who performed under the name Bing Stern. Stein has said, "We were not a poor family but my father's occupation as a musician did not allow for extras or luxuries." The family is said to have flipped a coin as a way to decide whether to emigrate to Australia or Canada, and Australia won the toss. Stein's elder brother and sister emigrated first, settling in Sydney. Stein, with the rest of his family, followed in 1953, on the Assisted Passage Migration Scheme.

Before moving to Australia in 1953, Stein's only experience of Antipodeans was an Australian schoolteacher who caned him for alleged cheating. Believing himself to be innocent, Stein has said of the experience, "I was not guilty but this plain injustice may have been the trigger for my rebellious streak." In Sydney, Stein attended Sydney Boys High School. There, Stein reinstated the school's football (soccer) team, which played for several years without formal recognition from the Sydney Boys High headmaster (either Gordon Barr or Kenneth John Andrews). In protest at this lack of official recognition, Stein wrote letters to the editor of the Sydney Morning Herald, and refused to wear his high school uniform blazer.

Stein attended the Sydney Law School, at the University of Sydney, from 1957 to 1960. In his articles of clerkship, Stein's master solicitor was Phillip Goldman, and later, John Pitman Webster of Uther Webster. During university Stein worked as a tram conductor in Sydney's eastern suburbs.

== Career ==
=== Barrister & Queens Counsel ===
Stein was admitted to the bar in 1961. In February 1964 Stein commenced at Mena House Chambers. He was part of the establishment of Forbes Chambers, Frederick Jordan Chambers, and Wardell Chambers. Stein took silk in 1981, and was a Queen's Counsel for two years before being appointed a judge of the District Court of New South Wales.

=== Other appointments ===
At the age of 38, Stein was appointed Deputy Ombudsman of New South Wales, a position he held from 1977 to 1979. Stein was President of the New South Wales Anti-Discrimination Board from 1979 to 1982.

Stein held numerous board and committee appointments, with particular involvement in social justice, civil liberties, and consumer advocacy issues. He was Chair of the Australian Consumers’ Association (now known as Choice) from 1974 to 1986, and Acting Chair of the Juvenile Leave Review Committee between 1985 and 1988. Stein was President of the Intellectually Handicapped Persons Review Tribunal from 1983 to 1989, and Chair of the Council of the Community Justice Centres of New South Wales between 1987 and 1993. Stein was Chair of the NRMA Community Advisory Committee from 1993 to 1998, and a member of the NRMA Crime Safe Committee from 1997 to 2000.

Stein was Chair of the Commission of Inquiry into the ACT Leasehold System in 1995. He was a member of the Board of the State Records Authority of New South Wales from 2001 to 2003. In 2012 Stein was chair of the New South Wales Environment Protection Authority, and chair of the Board of Governors of the Law and Justice Foundation of NSW.

=== Judicial appointments ===
Stein was appointed a judge of the District Court of New South Wales in June 1983. In June 1985 he became a judge of the Land and Environment Court of New South Wales. Stein was appointed a judge and judge of appeal of the Supreme Court of New South Wales in April 1997. Stein sat as an acting judge on the Supreme Court of Western Australia in 2001.

=== Retirement ===
Stein retired as a judge and judge of appeal from the Supreme Court of New South Wales on 11 April 2003. In his retirement, Stein served as an acting judge on the Supreme Court of New South Wales, and on the Court of Appeal and the Supreme Court of Fiji. Stein worked as an independent mediator and arbitrator. Stein sat on Independent Assessment Panels for referred development applications in the municipal councils of Mosman and Manly, in Sydney. In 2011 Stein reviewed compensation claims for businesses affected by the aborted CBD Metro. He was Chair of the NSW Environment Protection Authority (2012), and chair of the Board of Governors of the NSW Law and Justice Foundation (2012).

== Contribution to environmental and planning law ==
Among the contributions Stein made to the law in his judicial career, one of the most significant is the development of the jurisprudence on ecologically sustainable development. It was the period at the Land and Environment Court where Stein made his most influential decisions, including State Pollution Control Commission v Caltex Refining Company Pty Ltd (1991), Corkhill v Hope (1991), and Corkhill v Forestry Commission of New South Wales (No 2) (1991). About the latter case, Justice James Spigelman said, "This was the first occasion in Australia that wildlife protection law was enforced against a government authority. It laid the foundation for future statutory regimes, both in this State and at the Commonwealth level." In the seminal environmental law case Leatch v National Parks & Wildlife Service (1993), Stein considered the precautionary principle; this was the first time the principle had been applied in Common law. Stein's ability to write judgments swiftly and efficiently earned him the nickname 'Speedy' from fellow judges.

On 10 December 2009 the Law Council of Australia held the symposium, "The future of environmental law: A symposium to mark the contribution of Paul Stein in the field of environmental and planning law". The event included papers by Justice Peter McClellan QC, Justice Brian Preston SC, Professor Tim Bonyhady, and Emeritus Professor Ben Boer.

== Contribution to legal and judicial education ==
Stein worked as a lecturer and author in the fields of local government and environmental law, and in judicial education. He was a Distinguished Visitor at Macquarie University's Centre for International and Environmental Law (MU-CIEL). Stein was a patron of the Macquarie Journal of International and Comparative Environmental Law.

Stein was part of the United Nations Environment Programme’s (UNEP) Global Judges Symposium on Sustainable Development and the Role of Law, 2002. This resulted in the creation of a Judicial Portal, designed and developed by Stein, in co-operation with the World Conservation Union (IUCN). The Judicial Portal was the world’s first Internet-based judicial communication network.

== Controversy and progressive politics ==
As President of the Anti-Discrimination Board, in 1980 Stein raised objections to cartoons by Eric Jolliffe, which depicted Aboriginal people. Stein argued that Jolliffe’s cartoons may cause offence because they represented Aboriginal people as intellectually inferior racial stereotypes. Also in 1980, Stein argued for the 1977 Anti-Discrimination Act to be amended to recognise discrimination on the basis of political belief, expression, and activity. A year earlier Stein rallied for discrimination law to include considerations of discrimination on the basis of disability. In 1981 the Anti-Discrimination Act 1977 was amended to recognise persons with disabilities.

Also in 1981, Stein raised concerns about discrimination against Indochinese immigrants and refugees in Australia, calling for community education and leadership from government. In 1982 Stein called for an end to discrimination against Aboriginal people by police officers and judges, citing recent studies of arrests and incarceration. One controversial recommendation by the Anti-Discrimination Board, under Stein's leadership, was the call for the age of consent for sexual activity to be lowered to fourteen.

Stein obtained some notoriety for making progressive statements about brothel laws in New South Wales. In 1989, as a judge of the Land and Environment Court of New South Wales, Stein reportedly said that the New South Wales laws regarding prostitutes and brothels were "unsatisfactory and confusing", and the Land and Environment Court was not the forum in which to make moral judgments about prostitution.

== Publications ==
- With David Farrier, The environmental law handbook: Planning and land use in New South Wales, Thomson Reuters (Professional) Australia Limited, Sydney, 2011.
- Inquiry into the review of the Occupational Health and Safety Act 2000, New South Wales Government, Sydney, 2007.
- Annotated Local Government Act 1993 (NSW), Butterworths, Sydney, 1998.
- With Patrick Troy and Robert Yeomans, Report into the administration of the ACT leasehold : to the Chief Minister ACT Government, Publications and Public Communication, Canberra, 1995.
- The nature and consequences of racial discrimination, Government Printer, Sydney, 1982.
- 'Providing the citizen with defences against the bureaucracy', Conference on Law Reform, University of Sydney Law School, Sydney, 1977.
- With Greg Woods, Harsh and unconscionable contracts of work in New South Wales : section 88F of the Industrial Arbitration Act (New South Wales) - ‘a radical law’ , Law Book Co., Sydney 1972.

== Honours ==
In recognition of Stein's contribution to environmental law and to the community, he was appointed a Member of the Order of Australia (AM) in 1994.

== Personal ==
Stein was married and had three daughters. He died on 22 June 2024.
