= Edo (disambiguation) =

Edo is the historical name for Tokyo, Japan.

Edo or EDO may also refer to:

== Culture ==
- Edo language, a language spoken in Nigeria
- Edo people, the inhabitants of the province, creators of the Benin Empire
- Edo period, in Japanese history

== Places ==
- Edo River, a river in Japan
- Edo State, a state in Nigeria
- Edo (Wolaita), town in Wolayita Zone of Ethiopia
- Edo, the historical name for Benin City, Nigeria

== People ==
- Edo (given name)
- Edo (surname)

== Technology ==
- Edo Aircraft Corporation, a defunct American aircraft float designer
- EDO Corporation, an American technology company
- Extended data out DRAM, a type of computer memory
- Extended Duration Orbiter, a NASA program

== Other uses ==
- Edo Japan (restaurant), Canadian franchise restaurant
- 9782 Edo, a main-belt asteroid
- Balıkesir Koca Seyit Airport, IATA code EDO
- Economic development organization
- Ejaculatory duct obstruction
- Environmental Defender's Office NSW
- Environmental Defenders Office (Qld) Inc.
- European Drought Observatory, of the European Commission
- HFC EDO, a football club based in Haarlem, Netherlands
- Edo, a fictional race in Star Trek; see "Justice" (Star Trek: The Next Generation)
- Equal division of the octave, a system of equal temperament tuning in music

== See also ==
- Eddo (disambiguation)
- Edos, an operating system
- Edo., abbreviation used for "state" in Mexico (estado(s))
