= Australian Conservation Foundation v Woodside Energy =

Federal Court case

Australian Conservation Foundation Incorporated v Woodside Energy Ltd
- Court: Federal Court of Australia
- Full case name: Australian Conservation Foundation Incorporated v Woodside Energy Ltd & Anor
- Started: 21 June 2022
- Decided: 20 August 2024

Ruling
- Discontinued by ACF

Court membership
- Judge sitting: Justice Moshinsky

Keywords
- Suits against corporations, Environmental assessment and permitting, Gas and Oil

Area of law
- Environmental Law

Australian Conservation Foundation Incorporated v. Woodside Energy Ltd & Anor is a discontinued case in the Federal Court of Australia, initiated by the Australian Conservation Foundation (ACF) with representation from the Environmental Defenders Office (EDO). The case sought an injunction against Woodside Energy's Scarborough gas project due to its potential climate impacts on the Great Barrier Reef.

== Background ==
The Scarborough gas project is proposed to be located off the north-west coast of Western Australia in the Pilbara and is expected to generate approximately 1.37 billion tonnes of greenhouse gas emissions over the next 25 years. Although the gas extracted will primarily be burned overseas, its impact on climate change poses a threat to the Great Barrier Reef in Queensland, contributing to ongoing coral bleaching events.

Under the Environment Protection and Biodiversity Conservation Act 1999 (EPBC Act), offshore gas and oil projects are typically assessed under a streamlined process managed by the National Offshore Petroleum Safety and Environmental Management Authority (NOPSEMA) and are exempt from the EPBC Act's provisions. However, this exemption is not applicable if the project is likely to significantly impact World or National Heritage values, such as those of the Great Barrier Reef.

The ACF initiated legal proceedings, asserting that the greenhouse gas emissions from the Scarborough project will have significant adverse effects on the Great Barrier Reef. They argue that, due to the potential damage to this World Heritage site, the project must be evaluated under the stricter approval process mandated by the EPBC Act and should not proceed without obtaining the necessary approval.

== At Issue ==
The central issue in this case is whether the Scarborough gas project should be subjected to the approval processes outlined in Australia's national environmental law, specifically the EPBC Act.

== Outcome ==
The case was discontinued by ACF on 20 August 2024.

The reasons behind ACF's withdrawal remain unclear, but the organisation hinted at high costs, stating that, "litigation is expensive and risky, and communities often face opponents with significantly greater resources".

The ACF stated that while the science clearly indicates the warming effects of coal and gas, existing nature protection laws fail to account for these realities. They pointed out that the current legal framework does not require consideration of potential climate change impacts when approving fossil fuel projects. The ACF emphasised the need for communities to challenge harmful projects in court, given the inadequacies of the law in addressing the climate crisis.

Woodside's CEO, Meg O’Neill, welcomed the dismissal of the case, arguing that litigation against energy projects is "an ineffective way to pursue solutions to global climate and energy challenges" and "such approaches create needless uncertainty for businesses, communities, and the people who depend on the energy these projects produce".

With all primary environmental approvals secured, the Scarborough project is progressing, and Woodside anticipates the first shipment of liquefied natural gas to Asia by 2026.

== Impact ==
The ACF's case against Woodside's Scarborough gas project, despite its discontinuation, underscored several critical issues with significant implications for Australia's environmental policy. It was significant as one of the first instances of climate litigation focusing on gas, marking a shift in the legal landscape. This development not only raised important questions about the role of gas in the energy transition and highlighted the need for stronger climate accountability in Australian energy projects, but it also brought scrutiny to NOPSEMA, prompting discussions about their authority's adequacy in evaluating climate impacts. Ultimately, the case helped to increase public awareness of the environmental risks associated with gas projects.

== See also ==
- Environmental impact assessment
- Environmental law
- North West Shelf Venture
