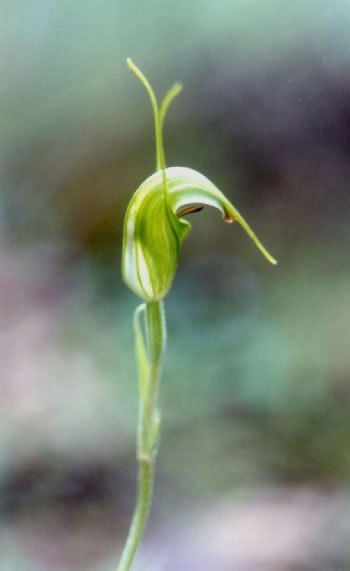

Scientific classification
- Kingdom: Plantae
- Clade: Tracheophytes
- Clade: Angiosperms
- Clade: Monocots
- Order: Asparagales
- Family: Orchidaceae
- Subfamily: Orchidoideae
- Tribe: Cranichideae
- Genus: Pterostylis
- Species: P. elegans

Binomial name
- Pterostylis elegans D.L.Jones

Synonyms
- Diplodium elegans (D.L.Jones) D.L.Jones & M.A.Clem.

= Pterostylis elegans =

Elegant greenhood

Species of orchid

Pterostylis elegans, commonly known as the elegant greenhood, is a species of orchid endemic to New South Wales. Non-flowering plants have a rosette of leaves flat on the ground but flowering plants have a single translucent white and dark green flower with reddish-brown markings near the tip.

== Description ==
Pterostylis elegans is a terrestrial, perennial, deciduous, herb with an underground tuber and when not flowering, a rosette of between two and four leaves, each leaf 12–25 mm (0.5–1 in) long and 10–15 mm (0.4–0.6 in) wide. Flowering plants have a single flower 14–18 mm (0.6–0.7 in) long and 6–8 mm (0.2–0.3 in) wide on a stem 150–280 mm (6–10 in) tall with four or five stem leaves. The flower is translucent white with dark green lines and markings. The dorsal sepal and petals are fused, forming a hood or "galea" over the column and which are reddish-brown near their ends. The dorsal sepal has a thread-like tip 5–8 mm (0.2–0.3 in) long. The lateral sepals are held closely against the galea, have erect thread-like tips 14–18 mm (0.6–0.7 in) long and a slightly protruding, notched sinus between their bases. The labellum is 8–11 mm (0.3–0.4 in) long, about 2 mm (0.08 in) wide, curved, dark brown and prominently protruding above the sinus. Flowering occurs from January to April.

== Taxonomy and naming ==
Pterostylis elegans was first formally described in 1997 by David Jones from a specimen collected in the Enfield State Forest on the Northern Tablelands. The description was published in The Orchadian. The specific epithet (elegans) is a Latin word meaning "tasteful", "choice", "fine" or "select".

== Distribution and habitat ==
The elegant greenhood grows between grasses and small shrubs in woodland and forest between the Barrington Tops National Park and Walcha.

== Conservation ==
Pterostylis elegans is listed as "vulnerable" under the New South Wales Threatened Species Conservation Act 1995. The main threats to the species are weed invasion, feral pig activity and cattle grazing.
