= Edo (given name) =

Edo is a masculine given name. Notable people with the name include:

== Arts ==
- Edo van Belkom (born 1962), Canadian author
- Edo Bertoglio (born 1951), Swiss photographer and film director
- Edo Brunner (born 1970), Dutch actor and presenter
- Edo Castro (born 1957), American jazz bassist and composer
- Edo de Waart (born 1941), Dutch conductor
- Edo Kovačević (1906–1993), Croatian artist
- Edo Maajka (born 1978), Bosnian rapper, record producer, and songwriter
- Edo Mulahalilović (1964–2010), Bosnian songwriter and producer
- Edo Murtić (1921–2005), Croatian painter
- Edo Peročević (1937–2007), Croatian actor

== Sports ==
- Edo Benetti (born 1941), Australian rules football player
- Edo Buma (born 1946), Dutch field hockey player
- Edo Hafner (born 1955), Slovenian ice hockey player
- Edo Marion (1910–2002), Yugoslav fencer
- Edo Murić (born 1991), Slovenian basketball player
- Edo Ophof (born 1959), Dutch footballer
- Edo Patregnani (1938–2013), Italian footballer
- Edo Terglav (born 1980), Slovenian ice hockey player
- Edo Vanni (1918–2007), American baseball player, manager, and executive

== Others ==
- Edo Belli (1918–2003), American architect
- Edo Ronchi (born 1950), Italian engineer and politician
- Edo Šen (1877–1949), Croatian architect
- Edo Udgoon Siyad, Kenyan politician

== See also ==
- Edo (surname)
- EDO (disambiguation)
