= Pluto LNG =

Liquefied natural gas plant in Australia

- Location within Western Australia
- Location: Burrup Peninsula, Western Australia, 20°36′36″S 116°46′32″E
- Products: LNG; Condensate; Pipeline Gas
- Company: Woodside Energy (90%); Kansai Electric (5%); MidOcean Energy (5%)

Pluto LNG is a liquefied natural gas (LNG) plant operated by Woodside Energy on the Burrup Peninsula, Western Australia.

The Pluto gas field was discovered in April 2005, government approvals for development were obtained in 2007 and the facility began producing LNG in 2012.

The facility has a single 5.9 Mtpa (million tonnes per annum) LNG train, small 25 TJ per day pipeline gas export facility and an LNG truck loading facility. Gas is supplied by the Pluto A platform, located 174 kilometres (108 mi) north-west of Karratha in 85 metres (279 ft) of water.

A second ~5 Mpta train and 225 TJ per day pipeline gas export facility were approved for construction at the site in 2021 as part of development of the Scarborough gas field. The first LNG produced from Scarborough is expected in 2026.
