= Mahla Pearlman =

Australian judge (1937–2011)

The Honourable Justice Mahla Pearlman AO

3rd Chief Judge of the Land and Environment Court (NSW)
- In office 6 April 1992 – 3 July 2003

Personal details
- Born: 2 June 1937 Boggabri, New South Wales, Australia
- Died: 2 December 2011 (aged 74)
- Parent(s): Minnie and Mark Pearlman
- Education: MLC School; University of Sydney
- Occupation: Judge, Lawyer

Mahla Liane Pearlman AO (2 June 1937 – 2 December 2011) was an Australian lawyer and chief judge of the Land and Environment Court of New South Wales from 1992 to 2003.

== Early life and education ==
Pearlman was born in Boggabri, New South Wales, the daughter of Minnie and Mark Pearlman. She attended Boggabri Public School with her younger brother Braham. She later attended MLC School in Burwood. She studied at the University of Sydney where she graduated with a Bachelor of Arts in 1957 and a Bachelor of Laws with Honours in 1960.

== Career ==
Pearlman was admitted as a solicitor on 11 March 1960 and in 1981 became the first woman President of the Law Society of New South Wales. In 1989 she was the first woman President of the Law Council of Australia, a body that represents both solicitors and barristers.

=== Land and Environment Court ===
In 1992 Pearlman was the first woman appointed the Chief Judge of the New South Wales Land and Environment Court. The appointment of a solicitor to such a high judicial position was controversial at a time when most judges had previously been barristers. Critics of that system said limiting the pool of potential judges to barristers was too narrow and widening it to include solicitors and academics would increase the number of women judges. In 1992 Jane Mathews was the only woman out of 45 Supreme Court Judges, Leonie Glynn was the only woman out of 9 Industrial Court judges and Angela Karpin was the only woman out of 56 judges of the District Court. Despite the initial controversy, Pearlman led the Court for 11 years with Justice Terry Sheahan stating that she led the court supremely well.

== Honours ==
In January 1985 Pearlman was made a Member of the Order of Australia for service to the legal profession, particularly the New South Wales Law Society. She was awarded the Centenary Medal for service to law and in June 2004 Pearlmen was made an Officer of the Order of Australia for service to the law and the judiciary, to the development of professional practice standards, and to the community.

Pearlman's career, contribution and memory is honoured by the Mahla Pearlman Oration, an annual event delivered by an eminent person concerned with environment and planning law. The Mahla Pearlman Award is an annual award to a young lawyer who has made a significant contribution to environmental law.

Legal offices
| Preceded by Jerrold Cripps | Chief Judge of the Land and Environment Court (NSW); 1992–2003 | Succeeded by Peter McClellan |
