= Environmental Defenders Office =

Non-governmental organisation in Australia

- Type: Non-governmental organisation
- Industry: Environmental law
- Founded: 2019
- Key people: Jo Shulman (CEO)
- Services: Litigation; Law reform advocacy; Community advice hotline; Legal education
- Website: edo.org.au

Environmental Defenders Office (EDO) is a company limited by guarantee and an Australian Charity / NGO that encourages, funds, and provides lawyers and legal support for litigation, law reform, and community engagement on climate change and environmental issues. EDO formed in late 2019 with the merger of eight separate state and territory organisations into one national organisation. Topics of interest to EDO include: climate change, biodiversity, water, and healthy communities.

EDO was founded in 1996 and consisted of nine independently constituted and managed community environmental law centres located in States and Territories of Australia. In 2014, EDO Victoria left to form Environmental Justice Australia. In 2019, the eight separate EDOs of Australia agreed to merge into one national organisation, Environmental Defenders Office (EDO Ltd). EDO has eight offices around Australia, located in: Adelaide, Brisbane, Cairns, Canberra, Darwin, Hobart, Perth and Sydney.

== Litigation ==
EDO represents individuals, community groups and non-government organisations in environmental and planning litigation across Australian jurisdictions. Its work primarily involves judicial review proceedings, merits appeals in planning tribunals, and public interest litigation under Commonwealth and state environmental laws, including the Environment Protection and Biodiversity Conservation Act 1999 (Cth) (EPBC Act), state planning legislation and offshore petroleum regulation frameworks.

EDO has been involved in a number of cases concerning coal mining, gas development, biodiversity protection, offshore petroleum activities and climate change impacts. Legal commentators have noted that Australia is one of the most active jurisdictions globally for climate-related public interest litigation, with EDO acting in several such matters.

Public interest environmental law centres such as EDO have been described by legal academics as playing a role in facilitating access to justice and testing administrative decision-making. Critics argue that such litigation can delay or increase the cost of major development projects. Supporters argue it strengthens regulatory accountability and improves decision-making quality.

== Law reform ==
EDO lawyers regularly make submissions on aspects of environmental law reform and participate in Federal and State Government inquiries and consultation processes. EDO has advocated strongly for changes to the Environmental Protection and Biodiversity Conservation Act to better protect Australia's unique wildlife and landscapes from ongoing threats.

== Community engagement ==
EDO conducts workshops, seminars and webinars to inform members of the public about how to participate in the legal process and use the law to protect the environment. The organisation produces factsheets on matters of environmental law and its fortnightly Insight newsletter highlights opportunities to participate in government decision making.

== Notable cases ==
=== Gloucester Resources Limited v Minister for Planning [2019] NSWLEC 7 ===
In February 2019, EDO (as EDO NSW) secured a landmark legal victory, with the refusal of the proposed Rocky Hill coal mine in the New South Wales Upper Hunter region. A key factor in the win was the mine's potential impacts on greenhouse gas emissions and climate change.

=== Bylong Coal Project (SSD 6367) ===
EDO (as EDO NSW) represented local community group, the Bylong Valley Protection Alliance, in opposing the 6.5 million tonnes-per-year open cut and underground mine – which would have been built in an area known for its scenic beauty and agricultural productivity. The Independent Planning Commission found that the proposed mine would have unacceptable impacts on groundwater and that the area could not be restored with the same scenic, heritage and natural values after the mine had closed.

Significantly, the panel cited the Rocky Hill case in its decision, describing the emissions from the mine's coal as 'problematical'. It said the mine was not in the public interest because it was contrary to the principles of intergenerational equity.

=== The Environment Centre Northern Territory v The Northern Territory Environment Protection Authority and Anor ===
In a legal first in 2019, the Environment Centre Northern Territory (ECNT), represented by the EDO (as EDO NT), challenged a permit to allow the clearing of more than 20,000 hectares of Northern Territory native vegetation at Maryfield Station, including on climate change grounds. The successful case demonstrates the community's ability to hold governments to account for their decisions.

=== Ralphs Bay Tasmania ===
From 2008 to 2010, EDO (as EDO Tasmania) represented community group, Save Ralphs Bay Inc, against a proposed 460-lot canal housing and marina development in a conservation area at Lauderdale. This would have been the first canal estate proposal in Tasmania.

=== Mackay Conservation Group Vs Commonwealth of Australia ===
In 2015, EDO (as EDO NSW) successfully challenged the Federal Government's approval of Adani's Carmichael coal mine in central Queensland, on behalf of the Mackay Conservation Group (MCG).The case was won over the Federal Environment Minister's failure to take into account the approved conservation advice for the Yakka Skink and the Ornamental Snake. With the consent of the parties, the Court set aside the decision of the Minister because his decision was legally flawed. MCG also alleged that the Federal Environment Minister failed to properly consider the impact of the Carmichael mine on the Great Barrier Reef when he approved the project.

=== Humane Society International Inc v Kyodo Senpaku Kaisha Ltd ===
Acting on behalf of client Humane Society International – Australia (HSI), EDO (as EDO NSW) first took action against Japanese whaling company Kyodo Senpaku Kaisha Ltd (Kyodo) in 2004, to stop it from whaling in breach of Australia's Environment Protection and Biodiversity Conservation Act 1999 (Cth) (EPBC Act).

Kyodo owned ships that conducted whaling in the Australian Whale Sanctuary for the Japanese Whale Research program. There was evidence that Kyodo had killed 3,558 minke whales and 13 fin whales since 2000/2001, with most of those killings taking place in the sanctuary. The evidence also indicated that Kyodo intended to start taking humpback whales in the 2007/2008 season.

This was a complex case run over several court appearances to establish the jurisdiction of the Federal Court and the right of HSI to serve documents on Kyodo. In 2008, EDO secured a victory when the Federal Court declared that Kyodo was breaching the EPBC Act. The Court granted an injunction to restrain Kyodo from further breaches. HSI representatives travelled to Japan to serve the injunction on Kyodo. But Japan didn't comply with that injunction and continued what it described as 'scientific' whaling in the Sanctuary between 2008 and 2013.

=== Australian Conservation Foundation Incorporated v Woodside Energy Ltd ===
The EDO represented the Australian Conservation Foundation in the case against Woodside Energy, which was initiated on June 21, 2022, and aimed to prevent the Scarborough gas project due to its potential climate impacts on the Great Barrier Reef. The case marked a new wave in Australian climate litigation focused on gas projects and brought scrutiny to NOPSEMA and the EPBC Act. The case was discontinued on August 20, 2024.

== Munkara v Santos controversy ==
On January 15, 2024, a significant judgment was handed down in the Australian Federal Court case, Munkara v Santos NA Barossa Pty Ltd. The Environmental Defenders Office (EDO) represented Munkara, but the findings by Justice Charlesworth have raised concerns about EDO's conduct in the case.

Judge Charlesworth found evidence of potential interference by EDO in the case, citing that the evidence presented was "so lacking in integrity that no weight can be placed." She expressed concerns that "some of the comments and actions of the EDO were “distorting and misrepresenting what the Indigenous informant had said," forcing her to approach their evidence with extreme caution. Ultimately, Santos prevailed in the case and was awarded costs. On 24 November 2024 the EDO was ordered to pay $9 Million AUD to Santos because the judge ruled the that they had not been impartial and had engaged in "a form of subtle coaching", and effectively became a party to the case.

Public reporting through the Australian Charities and Not-for-profits Commission indicated that EDO obtained a $6.5M loan facility to assist in meeting the costs order, and that in 2025 a philanthropic supporter forgave the outstanding balance of that loan. The loan forgiveness was reflected in EDO’s FY2025 audited accounts.

The judgment has sparked debate about the role of EDO and the use of government funding for such organisations. Western Australian Premier, Roger Cook, labeled the case "environmental lawfare" aimed at disrupting new resource ventures. Former Labor cabinet minister Joel Fitzgibbon echoed these criticisms, arguing that legal aid for activists harms the Australian economy and should be scrapped. " “Hopefully the broader community is beginning to see activist lawfare for what it is, ideological and a threat to our living standards" he stated.

While a departmental review cleared the group of any breaches of its government funding arrangements, both the federal and West Australian oppositions have pledged to de-fund the EDO if elected.

== Funding and resources ==
The Environmental Defenders' Offices (EDOs) of Australia is a registered charity regulated by the Australian Charities and Not-for-profits Commission. For the 2024-25 financial year, the EDO reported a revenue of $22.26 Million, more than a 60 percent increase on its reported revenue in 2022-23. Much of the additional revenue in 2024-25 is reflected in the loan facility provided by a philanthropic supporter to cover the Munkara v Santos case.

Revenue sources in 2024–25 included $4.19 million from government grants, $4.70 million from donations and bequests, $156,334 from the provision of goods and services, and $13.21 million categorised as “other revenue”. The EDO reported a net surplus of $8.56 million for the reporting period. Employee expenses totalled $12.23 million, accounting for the majority of total expenditure of $13.69 million. As of 30 June 2025, the organisation reported 82.13 full-time equivalent staff, comprising 63 full-time employees, 23 part-time employees and 2 casual employees, as well as an estimated 110 volunteers.

The EDO does not disclose a list of individual donors or grant providers. However, it has previously acknowledged support from philanthropic organisations including the Graeme Wood Foundation, Lenko Family Foundation, and McKinnon Family Foundation, and continues to receive funding from Commonwealth, state and territory governments for the provision of environmental legal services and access to justice programs. In 2024 the EDO declared $6.2 million in "overseas grants", including the Swiss Oak Foundation, the American Earthjustice organisation, the Waverley Street Foundation, the Danish KR Foundation and the European Climate Foundation. They no longer disclose what proportion of their funding is from overseas sources.

The funding of the EDO Australia has been a politically contested issue, reflecting broader tensions between environmental litigation, major project approvals and public funding of advocacy organisations. This has led to funding cuts, such as the defunding of the EDO by the Abbott government in 2013. However, the Albanese government subsequently reinstated federal funding. In the 2022 Federal Budget, the Labor Federal Government committed $9.8 million over four years to EDO Australia to "improve access to justice and legal assistance for Australians wanting to uphold environmental laws and protect Australia's environment and heritage."

Following the Federal Court proceedings brought on behalf of Tiwi Island traditional owner Dennis Tipakalippa in relation to the Barossa gas project, the Court made adverse findings regarding EDO’s conduct in the litigation, including findings of professional misconduct. In response, the Commonwealth Government suspended federal funding to EDO in 2023 and commissioned an independent review into the organisation’s governance, management and use of public funds. Funding arrangements were subsequently revised following the review process.

== Links ==
- Environmental law
- Environmental Defenders Office NSW
- Environmental Defenders Office Qld
