= Angus Talbot =

Australian lawyer and barrister (born 1936)

Robert Neville Talbot
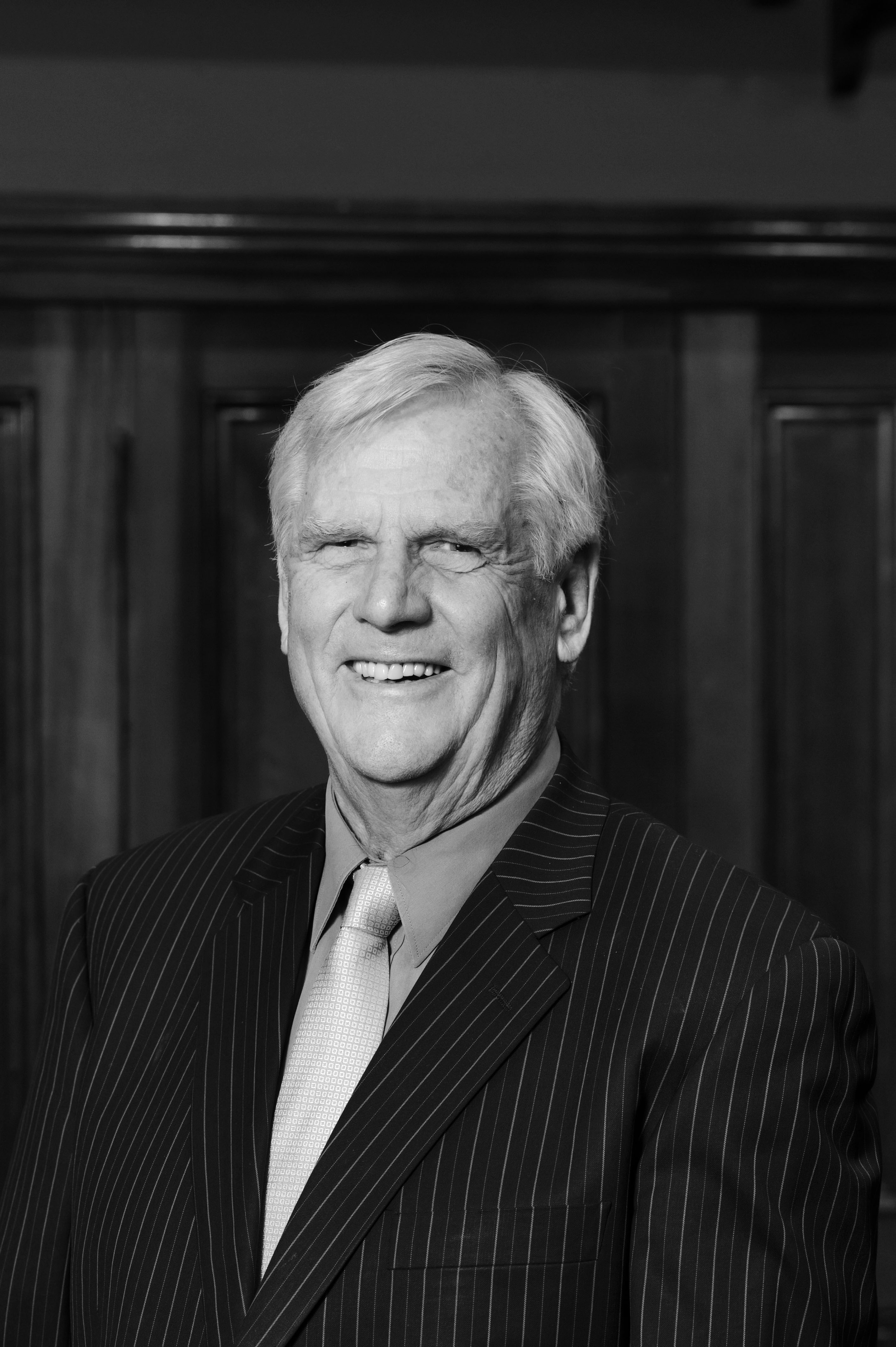
- Born: 11 August 1936 (age 89); Sydney Australia
- Education: Newington College; University of Sydney
- Occupations: Retired Judge, Land and Environment Court of New South Wales
- Title: The Hon. Angus Talbot
- Spouse: Ellen Talbot née Coombes
- Children: 3 daughters, 2 sons
- Parent(s): Robert John Talbot and Annie Winafred Andrews

Robert Neville (Angus) Talbot is an Australian lawyer and barrister. He is a retired judge of the Land and Environment Court of New South Wales and the immediate past chairman of the executive committee of the Council of Newington College.

== Early life ==
Christened Robert Neville, Talbot has always been known by the name Angus. He was educated at Newington College (1949–1953) and graduated in law from the University of Sydney.

== Legal career ==
After practising as a solicitor and partner with Fitzgerald White Talbot & Co from 1960 to 1982, Talbot was admitted to the New South Wales Bar in 1982. He was appointed to the Land and Environment Court of New South Wales bench in 1992 and retired as a Judge in 2007.

== Committees ==
- Vice-President, Environmental Law Association (NSW)
- President, Old Newingtonians' Union (1997–1998)
- Deputy-Chairman, Newington College Council (2002–2007)
- Chairman, Newington College Council (2007–2013)

Preceded by Peter Meares	Chairman; Newington College Council; 2007–2013	Succeeded by Tony MacDonald
