= Jayne Jagot =

Australian High Court justice since 2022 (born 1965)

The Honourable Justice Jayne Jagot

Justice of the High Court of Australia
- Incumbent
- Assumed office 17 October 2022
- Nominated by: Anthony Albanese
- Appointed by: David Hurley
- Preceded by: Patrick Keane

Judge of the Federal Court of Australia
- In office 3 September 2008 – 16 October 2022

Judge of the Land and Environment Court (NSW)
- In office 2006 – 2 September 2008

Personal details
- Born: 19 June 1965 (age 60)
- Spouse: Peter McClellan
- Education: Baulkham Hills High School; Macquarie University; University of Sydney

Jayne Margaret Jagot (/ˈdʒeɪnˈdʒeɪɡoʊ/) is a justice of the High Court of Australia. She was appointed to the High Court in October 2022. Jagot was previously a judge of the Federal Court of Australia. Before that, she served as a judge of the Land and Environment Court of New South Wales and a partner at the law firm Mallesons Stephen Jaques.

== Early life and education ==
Jagot was born in England and migrated to Australia with her family in 1968. Jagot studied at Baulkham Hills High School. She received her arts degree from Macquarie University in 1987. She subsequently received a law degree with first-class honours from the University of Sydney in 1991. At her Federal Court swearing-in ceremony, it was remarked that during her time there, "she appears to have won every available prize in law". She had won the Butterworths Prize for Most Proficient in First Year, the Pitt Cobbett Prize for Administrative Law, the Sir Alexander Beattie Prize in Company Law, the Margaret Ethel Peden Prize in Real Property, the Minter Ellison Prize in Intellectual Property, and the Nancy Gordon Smith Prize for Honours.

== Career ==
Jagot worked as a solicitor with Mallesons Stephen Jaques (now King & Wood Mallesons) from 1992 to 2002. They specialized in planning and environmental law. She was then promoted to partner in 1997. She was admitted to the bar in 2002, after which she developed a successful practice as a barrister.

=== Land and Environment Court ===
Jagot was appointed as a Judge of the Land and Environment Court of New South Wales in 2006. She also served as an acting judge of the Equity Division of the Supreme Court of New South Wales for a period.

=== Federal Court ===
Jagot was appointed as a Judge of the Federal Court of Australia on 3 September 2008.

=== High Court ===
On 17 October 2022, Jagot was sworn in as a Justice of the High Court of Australia, replacing the retiring Justice Patrick Keane. On Jagot's appointment, the High Court of Australia had a majority of female Justices for the first time in its history.

== Personal life ==
Jagot is married to former New South Wales Supreme Court judge and royal commissioner Peter McClellan.

== See also ==
- List of justices of the High Court of Australia
- List of judges of the Federal Court of Australia

Legal offices
Preceded by Patrick Keane	Justice of the High Court of Australia; 2022–present	Incumbent
