= Scarborough gas field =

Gas development in Australia

Coordinates: 20°44′45″S 112°38′38″E

Scarborough
- Country: Australia
- Region: Indian Ocean
- Offshore/onshore: offshore
- Operator: Woodside

Field history
- Discovery: 1979

Production
- Estimated gas in place: 200×10^{9} m^{3} 7.3×10^{12} cu ft

The Scarborough gas field is a natural gas field located in the Indian Ocean north-west of Exmouth on the coast of Western Australia.

The total Contingent Resource of the Scarborough gas field is around 7.3 trillion cubic feet. In 2018 Woodside bought ExxonMobil's 50% share of the retention lease, adding to the 25% it had acquired from BHP in 2016. Woodside now owns 75% of the retention lease and are operator of the joint venture, with BHP retaining the final 25%. On 7 April 2022, the company announced that final Australian federal and state government approvals for the project had been received.

== Offshore development concept ==
The Scarborough gas field is currently not a producing asset. Woodside is proposing to develop the Scarborough resource with 12 subsea, high-rate gas wells tied back to a semi-submersible platform moored in 900 m of water. The ~20,000 t topsides has processing facilities for gas dehydration and compression to transport the gas through a ~400 km pipeline to the Woodside operated Pluto LNG facility.

The Scarborough resource has been fully appraised and the reservoir consists of excellent quality sands which support recoverable volumes in excess of 0.5 Tcf per well. The Scarborough gas reservoir is relatively shallow at only 900 – 1,000 m below the mudline. The lean reservoir gas is classified as ‘sweet’ with no detectable H_{2}S and only trace levels of CO_{2}. However, sources other than Woodside have contradicted this finding and established that the field would result in an additional 1.6 billion tonnes of CO_{2} emissions over its lifetime - the equivalent of 15 coal fired power plants. Other sources have suggested that no new oil or gas resources should be developed for Australia to have a chance of meeting their climate goals.

A phased development drilling program is proposed, with seven wells available at ready for start-up (RFSU). Given the shallow depth below the mudline and anticipated strong aquifer support, a combination of horizontal and high angle wells have been designed with maximum well lengths of ~2,500 m. The well and completion designs align with Woodside's extensive development experience offshore north-western Australia.

The proposed carbon steel trunkline will be ~400 km long, significantly shorter than recently constructed offshore gas pipelines in the region. Woodside's ongoing subsea development programs in the North West Shelf and Exmouth area provide contemporary analogues for cost and execution schedule estimates. The seabed transition zone from the deep water to the North West Shelf is well known to Woodside after previous successful projects in the area. In preparation for future expansion, Pluto LNG constructed a shore crossing for a second trunkline.

SCARBOROUGH SNAPSHOT
Commonwealth title	WA-1-R
Location	~300 km offshore, WA
Contingent Resource estimate	7.3 Tcf (100%) dry gas (2C)
Water depth	950 m
Gas composition	n 96% methane, 4% nitrogen and 50 ppm CO_{2}
Average well recovery	0.5 Tcf per well
Wells at RFSU	Seven
Trunkline distance	400 km
Cost estimate (100%)¹	Upstream: $6.0 bn Downstream: $2.5 – $3.7 bn Total: $8.5 - $9.7 bn
Onshore²	Lower-cost brownfield expansion of Pluto LNG facility
1. The cost estimate of US$8.5 – $9.7 billion (100% project) is a real terms 2018, Class 0, pre-concept select level figure and; includes a 25% contingency. Pre-final investment decision activities are expected to be approximately $0.5 billion (100% project).: 2. Subject to all necessary joint venture approvals, regulatory and/or appropriate commercial agreements being finalised.

== Onshore development concept ==
The onshore development concept is a brownfield expansion of the existing Woodside operated Pluto LNG facility. LNG expansion projects have traditionally provided cost competitive new LNG capacity into the market and attractive returns on investment. Extensive onshore development studies for Pluto LNG expansion were undertaken in 2010/11, including a complete front-end engineering and design phase for a second LNG train at Pluto. Previous studies combined with Woodside's 2017 market engagement on LNG expansion, means that Woodside is well placed to assess and estimate the cost of an LNG expansion train for Scarborough.

The composition of the Scarborough gas itself is well suited to the Pluto LNG plant which is designed for lean gas and nitrogen removal. Pre-investment in the Pluto LNG site for future expansion and existing environmental approvals for a second LNG train further de-risks the project.

== Cost ==
The cost estimate of $8.5 – $9.7 billion (100% project) is a real terms 2018, Class 0, pre-concept select phase cost estimate and includes a 25% contingency. Activities prior to final investment decision are expected to cost approximately $0.5 billion (100% project). Woodside's position in Scarborough contradicts ex-CEO Peter Coleman's 2021 statement that 'the era of massive new LNG projects is over for Australia'. Alignment of Woodside's equity in both the upstream Scarborough resource and downstream Pluto LNG infrastructure provides for greater control and certainty of development. Woodside can realise the value from development of the material unallocated 7.3 Tcf (2C, 100%) Scarborough gas field through a lower-cost brownfield expansion of our high-reliability Pluto LNG facility.

The current cost estimates are subject to ongoing legal and environmental challenges, including a case before the Supreme Court of Western Australia set to be heard later in 2021. Investors have raised concerns that the proposed costs for this project are 'crazy from the perspective of Woodside shareholders' and 'financially illiterate'. Additionally, the merger and subsequent Final Investment Decision are contingent on shareholder approval votes, despite being described as 'a disastrous outcome for Woodside shareholders and climate.
