= Ecology of Melbourne =

Geographic aspect of Melbourne, Australia

The ecology of Melbourne, Victoria, is a complex and dynamic system influenced by the city's geographical location, climate, and human activities. Melbourne's natural environment includes diverse ecosystems ranging from coastal heathlands to grassy woodlands, riparian forests, and wetlands. These ecosystems support a rich array of flora and fauna, many of which are unique to the region. However, urbanisation, habitat fragmentation, and the introduction of invasive species have significantly altered the city's ecological balance, leading to various conservation and restoration initiatives.

== Climate and geography ==
=== Climate ===
Melbourne experiences a temperate oceanic climate (Köppen classification Cfb), characterised by warm summers, mild autumns, cool winters, and variable springs. The city's weather is famously changeable, largely due to its location between hot inland regions and the cooler Southern Ocean, which brings frequent shifts in air masses. Annual rainfall averages around 600 to 650 mm, with most precipitation occurring in the cooler months. This climate plays a significant role in shaping Melbourne’s ecosystems, influencing vegetation patterns, water availability, and seasonal wildlife behaviour.

==== Temperature variability ====
Average summer temperatures in Melbourne range from 14 to 26 °C (57 to 79 °F), though heatwaves can occasionally push temperatures above 40 °C (104 °F). During winter, temperatures drop to a cooler range of 6 to 14 °C (43 to 57 °F). This seasonal temperature variability affects plant growth cycles (phenology), with native flora and fauna adapted to the fluctuations. The warmer temperatures in spring and summer encourage flowering and fruiting in many plant species, while cooler winter temperatures trigger dormancy in others. This variability also impacts wildlife activity and behaviour, with many species exhibiting seasonal breeding patterns and altered foraging habits. Additionally, the city’s surrounding bushland areas are more vulnerable to bushfires during dry, hot summer conditions, which have important ecological impacts on vegetation regeneration and habitat availability.

==== Rainfall patterns ====
Rainfall in Melbourne is unevenly distributed throughout the year, with the highest rainfall typically occurring in winter and spring. However, the city is prone to drought conditions, particularly during El Niño events, which can lead to prolonged dry spells. These variations in rainfall influence water availability, impacting both natural ecosystems and human activities. Wet winters and springs support the health of wetlands and riparian vegetation, creating favourable conditions for water-dependent species such as amphibians and migratory birds. Conversely, drought conditions place stress on local flora and fauna, with reduced soil moisture impacting vegetation growth and increasing competition for water resources among wildlife. In prolonged dry periods, water scarcity also affects agricultural productivity and urban water supplies, underscoring the importance of sustainable water management.

=== Geography and topography ===
Melbourne is situated on the northernmost point of Port Phillip Bay, extending inland towards the Dandenong Ranges and the Great Dividing Range. The city is built on a unique blend of volcanic plains, sedimentary formations, and coastal dunes, each contributing to a variety of soil types and landforms that support diverse ecosystems.

==== Volcanic plains ====
The western suburbs of Melbourne lie on the Victorian Volcanic Plain, one of the world's largest basalt plains. This region features shallow but fertile basalt-derived soils, which support distinctive grassland species adapted to the open, rocky landscape. The plains are home to rare and critically endangered ecosystems, such as the Western Basalt Plains Grassland, which is rich in native grasses like kangaroo grass (Themeda triandra) and features wildflowers that bloom seasonally. Urban development and agriculture have greatly reduced these habitats, threatening many species that rely on this grassland ecosystem for survival.

==== Coastal dunes and wetlands ====
Melbourne's coastline along Port Phillip Bay comprises sandy beaches, coastal dunes, and ecologically significant wetland areas. These coastal zones support diverse plant communities, including salt-tolerant grasses and shrubs such as coast saltbush (Atriplex cinerea) and coast beard-heath (Leucopogon parviflorus). The wetlands, especially important around Port Phillip and Western Port, provide critical stopover points for migratory birds like the red-necked stint (Calidris ruficollis) and sharp-tailed sandpiper (Calidris acuminata), as well as habitat for marine life. These environments are crucial for maintaining coastal biodiversity and play a role in flood mitigation and water purification.

==== Rivers and waterways ====
The Yarra River, originating in the Yarra Ranges, is Melbourne’s most significant waterway, flowing through the city before reaching Port Phillip Bay. The river, along with other key waterways like the Maribyrnong and Werribee rivers, supports riparian zones with native vegetation such as river red gum (Eucalyptus camaldulensis) and silver wattle (Acacia dealbata). These rivers and their surrounding vegetation not only provide essential water resources for Melbourne's ecosystems but also support a range of wildlife habitats and contribute to stabilising riverbanks, reducing erosion, and enhancing water quality.

== Flora ==
Melbourne's native flora is shaped by its diverse climates, soils, and landforms, supporting a range of ecosystems that include grasslands, woodlands, coastal heathlands, and wetlands. Despite urbanisation, the city retains patches of native vegetation, which are vital for sustaining biodiversity, supporting local wildlife, and maintaining ecological balance.

=== Woodlands ===
In areas like the Yarra Ranges and Dandenong Ranges, native eucalypt woodlands dominate the landscape. Key species include the towering mountain ash (Eucalyptus regnans), one of the tallest flowering plants in the world, and messmate (Eucalyptus obliqua), known for its adaptability to different soil types. These woodlands provide essential habitat for a wide range of wildlife, including marsupials, diverse bird species, and insects that rely on the trees for shelter and food. The complex canopy layers and undergrowth offer varied microhabitats, supporting rich biodiversity.

=== Grasslands ===
Melbourne’s native grasslands, particularly on the Western Basalt Plains, are among the most endangered ecosystems in Australia, largely due to agricultural and urban expansion. Dominated by resilient species such as kangaroo grass (Themeda triandra), these grasslands support unique flora and fauna, including several threatened species like the striped legless lizard (Delma impar). The sparse, open nature of these grasslands allows for abundant sunlight, promoting a range of grasses and wildflowers that are crucial for maintaining soil health, providing habitat for insects, and offering foraging grounds for native birds and small mammals.

=== Wetlands and riparian vegetation ===
Melbourne's wetlands, such as those in the Western Port and Port Phillip Bay regions, are rich ecosystems that support a variety of aquatic plants and provide critical breeding grounds for waterbirds, including migratory species. Wetland vegetation, including species like Baumea sedges (Baumea spp.) and spike-rushes (Eleocharis spp.), play an important role in water filtration and flood management. Riparian zones along the Yarra River and its tributaries feature native plants like swamp paperbark (Melaleuca ericifolia) and silver wattle (Acacia dealbata). These trees and shrubs help stabilise riverbanks, reduce erosion, and create habitat corridors for wildlife, linking isolated patches of native vegetation and supporting local biodiversity.

== Fauna ==
Melbourne’s fauna is diverse, with species adapted to its varied habitats, from urban parks to coastal wetlands. The region hosts a mix of native and introduced species, some of which have adapted remarkably well to human-dominated landscapes.

=== Mammals ===
Native mammals such as the common brushtail possum (Trichosurus vulpecula), eastern grey kangaroo (Macropus giganteus), and sugar glider (Petaurus breviceps) are frequently seen in Melbourne's suburban areas, parks, and reserves. These mammals play an important ecological role: possums, for instance, help disperse seeds, while kangaroos help maintain grassland habitats. The grey-headed flying fox (Pteropus poliocephalus), a large fruit bat, is also common in Melbourne’s parks, where it aids in pollination and seed dispersal. Despite urban pressures, possums are especially adaptable, often finding shelter in roofs and gardens.

=== Birds ===
Melbourne is home to a rich variety of bird species, including the widely recognized Australian magpie (Gymnorhina tibicen), which has adapted to urban environments and even engages in complex social behaviours with humans. In contrast, species like the superb fairywren (Malurus cyaneus) are more specialised, thriving in bushland and parklands. Birds of prey, such as the wedge-tailed eagle (Aquila audax) and peregrine falcon (Falco peregrinus), are also found in Melbourne’s outskirts, especially in open or mountainous areas. Wetlands across Melbourne attract waterbirds such as the black swan (Cygnus atratus) and royal spoonbill (Platalea regia), both of which play a role in maintaining healthy aquatic ecosystems.

=== Reptiles and amphibians ===
Melbourne’s reptile species include the eastern blue-tongued lizard (Tiliqua scincoides), often seen basking in suburban gardens, and the eastern long-necked turtle (Chelodina longicollis), which relies on the city’s wetland habitats. Amphibians like the common eastern froglet (Crinia signifera) and southern brown tree frog (Litoria ewingii) are key indicators of wetland health, with their presence often reflecting the quality of local water sources. These frogs are common in suburban gardens as well, where they benefit from backyard ponds and natural water sources.

=== Marine Life ===
Melbourne’s coastal areas support marine species such as the Australian fur seal (Arctocephalus pusillus doriferus) and bottlenose dolphin (Tursiops aduncus), which are frequently sighted along the shoreline and attract significant interest from locals and tourists. These marine mammals contribute to the biodiversity of the Port Phillip Bay area and play a role in maintaining marine ecosystem health.

=== Fish ===
The rivers and streams around Melbourne are home to native freshwater fish like the Australian grayling (Prototroctes maraena) and river blackfish (Gadopsis marmoratus), both of which are important for the region's aquatic ecosystems. These species help sustain predator populations and contribute to nutrient cycles in freshwater habitats.

=== Invertebrates ===
Melbourne’s invertebrate fauna includes species like the spiny leaf insect (Extatosoma tiaratum), various butterflies, and a range of spiders, all of which contribute to local biodiversity. Invertebrates play critical roles in pollination, soil health, and as food sources for other species, underscoring their importance to Melbourne's ecosystems.

== Invasive species ==
Several invasive species pose significant threats to the native ecosystems of Greater Melbourne:

- Foxes: Introduced in the 19th century, foxes (Vulpes vulpes) are major predators of native wildlife, affecting populations of birds, small mammals, and reptiles. Their presence leads to a decline in these vulnerable populations, reducing biodiversity and disrupting the natural food chain.
- European rabbits: These rabbits (Oryctolagus cuniculus) compete with native herbivores for food and cause extensive damage to vegetation through overgrazing, leading to soil erosion and habitat degradation. Such habitat loss can have lasting effects on other native species reliant on the same ecosystem.
- Weeds: Invasive plant species such as gorse (Ulex europaeus) and blackberry (Rubus fruticosus) threaten native flora by outcompeting indigenous plants. This disrupts the ecological balance, altering nutrient cycles, water availability, and the overall structure of plant communities, which affects the animals that depend on native vegetation.

== Pollution ==
Melbourne, like many urban areas, faces various pollution challenges that impact air, water, and soil quality. Urbanisation, industrial activity, and traffic contribute to pollution levels, which in turn affect human health, wildlife, and ecosystem processes. Efforts are ongoing to monitor and reduce pollution in the city to protect both residents and the natural environment.

=== Air pollution ===
Air quality in Melbourne is generally good, but pollution levels can spike due to factors like vehicle emissions, industrial activity, and seasonal bushfires. Key pollutants include particulate matter (PM10 and PM2.5), nitrogen dioxide (NO_{2}), and ozone (O^{3}). On hot days, photochemical smog, formed by the reaction between sunlight and pollutants, can pose a health risk, particularly for vulnerable populations. Bushfire smoke, which often affects Melbourne in the summer, contributes to elevated PM2.5 levels, reducing air quality and impacting respiratory health. Air pollution also affects plant health, inhibiting growth and affecting local biodiversity by altering soil and water composition through deposited particles.

=== Water pollution ===
Melbourne’s rivers, creeks, and Port Phillip Bay are vulnerable to water pollution, primarily from urban runoff, industrial discharges, and agricultural runoff. Stormwater, often carrying litter, oils, chemicals, and nutrients, flows into waterways after rainfall, particularly affecting the Yarra River and its tributaries. Nutrient pollution, largely from fertilisers and detergents, can lead to eutrophication in rivers and bays, promoting excessive algae growth that depletes oxygen and harms aquatic life. Heavy metals and pesticides from industrial and agricultural sources also pose risks to both wildlife and human health, as they can accumulate in sediments and bioaccumulate in aquatic organisms.

=== Soil pollution ===
Industrial activity, waste disposal, and urban development contribute to soil contamination in parts of Melbourne. Pollutants such as heavy metals, hydrocarbons, and chemicals can accumulate in soils, particularly near former industrial sites. These contaminants pose risks to plants, animals, and people through direct exposure or via leaching into waterways. Soil pollution can hinder vegetation growth, affecting the quality of green spaces and habitats that support local biodiversity. Efforts are underway to manage contaminated sites and promote soil health through remediation programs and stricter regulations on waste disposal and industrial emissions.

=== Noise pollution ===
Noise pollution, largely from traffic, construction, and industrial operations, affects the quality of life in Melbourne’s urban areas. Noise disrupts wildlife, particularly in habitats near major roadways and industrial zones, where it can alter animal behaviour, stress levels, and communication patterns. Birds, for example, may change their singing behaviours in response to urban noise, which can interfere with mating and territorial claims. Efforts to mitigate noise pollution include implementing noise barriers, regulating industrial noise emissions, and creating green buffers to reduce urban noise levels.

=== Light pollution ===
Light pollution from street lighting, buildings, and signage is another challenge in Melbourne’s urban environment. Excessive artificial light disrupts natural rhythms for both humans and wildlife, affecting sleep patterns and navigation. For local wildlife, light pollution interferes with nocturnal behaviours, particularly for animals like bats, frogs, and moths that rely on darkness for natural activity patterns. To combat light pollution, initiatives to promote ‘dark sky’ policies and reduce unnecessary lighting in urban areas are being explored, benefiting nocturnal species and preserving natural night-time conditions.

== Conservation and restoration efforts ==
Melbourne is home to a diverse range of ecosystems and wildlife, and various conservation and restoration initiatives are underway to protect these valuable natural resources. These efforts involve government agencies, non-profit organisations, local communities, and academic institutions working collaboratively to enhance biodiversity, restore habitats, and mitigate the impacts of urbanisation and climate change.

=== Protected areas and reserves ===
Melbourne boasts numerous parks, reserves, and protected areas that play a critical role in conserving native flora and fauna. Notable examples include:

- Royal Park: This large urban park provides habitat for various bird species, reptiles, and small mammals, serving as a crucial green space within the city. Efforts are ongoing to enhance its biodiversity through habitat restoration and management programs.
- Yarra Bend Park: Home to significant remnant vegetation, including eucalypt woodlands and wetlands, this park is part of a broader strategy to protect biodiversity in the Yarra River corridor. Conservation activities focus on invasive species management and habitat restoration to support native wildlife.
- Dandenong Ranges National Park: Located just outside Melbourne, this national park protects diverse ecosystems, including cool temperate rainforests and montane woodlands. Restoration programs aim to manage pest species and regenerate degraded areas to enhance habitat for native species.

=== Habitat restoration projects ===
Restoration projects throughout Melbourne are aimed at rehabilitating degraded habitats and improving ecological connectivity. These initiatives include:

- Greening the West: A collaborative project focused on restoring biodiversity in Melbourne's western suburbs through tree planting, habitat restoration, and community engagement. This initiative aims to improve green cover and connectivity between fragmented habitats.
- Urban Forest Strategy: Melbourne's Urban Forest Strategy seeks to increase tree canopy cover within the city, enhancing urban biodiversity, improving air quality, and mitigating the urban heat island effect. The strategy involves planting thousands of new trees and maintaining existing urban forests.
- Wetland Restoration Projects: Various initiatives aim to restore and protect wetlands in the Port Phillip Bay region, including the establishment of new wetland habitats and the enhancement of existing sites to support waterbirds and aquatic biodiversity.

=== Community involvement and education ===
Community engagement is vital for the success of conservation efforts in Melbourne. Programs such as:

- Citizen Science Initiatives: Projects like the "Birds in Backyards" program encourage residents to monitor local bird populations, helping gather valuable data for conservation planning while fostering community interest in local biodiversity.
- Bushcare Groups: Volunteer groups participate in activities such as planting native species, removing invasive plants, and restoring local habitats. These groups play a crucial role in enhancing biodiversity in urban and suburban environments.
- Educational Programs: Schools and community organisations often run educational programs that focus on local ecology and conservation, fostering a sense of stewardship among residents and encouraging sustainable practices.

=== Regulatory frameworks and policies ===
Government policies at both state and local levels play a significant role in conservation efforts. The Victorian Government's Biodiversity Plan outlines strategies for protecting native species and habitats, while local councils implement planning controls and environmental management frameworks to guide land use and development, ensuring the protection of valuable natural areas.

== See also ==
- Environment of Australia
