= Eddo =

Eddo can refer to:

== People ==
=== Family name ===
- Eddo, bishop of Chur
- Walid Eido, Lebanese politician

=== First name ===
- Eddo Brandes, cricket player

=== Nickname ===
- Eddie Winslow, actor
- Mark Edmondson, tennis player

== Astronomy ==
- EDDO, extreme detached disc objects.

== Other uses ==
- Eddoe, also known as eddo, a tropical vegetable (Colocasia antiquorum)

== See also ==
- Edo (disambiguation)
