= Environmental Defenders Office (Qld) Inc. =

Former non-governmental organisation in Australia

- Type: Non-Governmental Organisation
- Industry: Environmental law
- Founded: 1989
- Headquarters: Queensland
- Products: Legal representation, advice, submissions on policy formulation, submissions on legislation, and education designed to facilitate public participation in environmental decision making
- Website: www.edo.org.au/

The Environmental Defenders Office (Qld) Inc. (EDO Qld) was a non-profit, non-government Community Legal Centre which was established in 1989. and is one of nine independent Environmental Defenders Offices located across Australia which collaborated in a loose network known as the EDOs of Australia.

In 2019 EDO Qld merged with other EDOs around the country to form a new national organisation Environmental Defenders Office (EDO Ltd).

== Background ==
The EDO's lawyers provide access to justice for the Queensland community by offering legal advice and education and engaging in policy and law reform. The work done by community legal centres specialising in public interest environmental law such as EDO Qld has been acknowledged. In a 2012 report into access to justice, the Commonwealth Productivity Commission concluded that "there are strong grounds for the legal assistance sector to receive funding to undertake strategic advocacy, law reform and public interest litigation including in relation to environmental matters" given the important contribution the EDOs make to not only strengthening community rights but also the efficiency and effectiveness of Australia's environmental protection laws. This sentiment has been echoed members of the legal profession, including most notably the Honourable Judge Brian Preston, Chief Judge of the Planning and Environment Court of New South Wales, as well as Adrian Finanzio SC.

== Priority areas ==
The 'priority areas' for the work of EDO Qld includes; climate change, environmental planning and development, biodiversity conservation, natural resource management (particularly mining and coal seam gas) and environmental justice.

== Legal advice ==
The EDO helps people understand their legal rights and explains how to exercise them in relation to environmental issues that affect the broader community. They also run Court actions where there are serious questions of potential environmental harm.

== Key cases ==
While Queensland has no legal aid for public interest environmental law, EDO Qld, with the pro bono assistance of members of the Queensland bar and private donations, has managed a number of cases in Queensland. These include:

- 'The Xstrata Climate Change Case': Queensland Conservation Council Inc v Xstrata Coal Queensland P/L,

Queensland Conservation Council (QCC), the state's peak environmental body, represented by EDO Qld sought to have climate change impacts taken into account in the assessment of an application for a giant coal mine. In the initial hearing in Queensland's Land and Resources Tribunal the QCC's expert witnesses presented evidence that greenhouse gas emissions cause climate change and resulting in great environmental harm, for example the Great Barrier Reef will suffer more frequent bleaching events over the next few decades. At first instance, the Tribunal President, Mr. Koppenol rejected the QCC's submission that he have regard to ecologically sustainable development principles (ESD) to mitigate environmental degradation caused by global warming as he was not convinced of the link between the emissions from the mine and harm caused by climate change. The QCC was awarded an appeal when the three judges of Queensland's Court of Appeal unanimously found that the QCC had been denied natural justice. However, the very same day QCC won its appeal, the Queensland Government denied them the right to a retrial by announcing its intention to pass special legislation to validate the mining lease and environmental authority. Despite Parliament's protection of mining interests over the community’s legal right to uphold the principles of ecologically sustainable development, the case was successful in demonstrating the legal legitimacy of the issue and as the first step in an ongoing effort to compel governments to account for climate change impacts when they assess carbon-polluting development. A more detailed summary of the history of the case and its legal implications can be found at Environmental Law Australia.

- 'The Nathan Dams Case': Queensland Conservation Council Inc v Minister for Environment and Heritage,

The EDO's successful running of the case ensured that Federal assessment of a proposed dam in Central Queensland would include consideration of the potential for pollution of the World Heritage area due to agriculture enabled by the dam development. By compelling the environment minister to consider these flow-on impacts, the case has considerably broadened the scope of federal environmental assessments. A more detailed summary of the history of the case and its legal implications can be found at Environmental Law Australia.

- 'The Flying-Fox Case': Booth v Bosworth,]

The EDO Qld managed the case brought by conservationist Dr Carol Booth against a farmer using electric grids to kill the spectacled flying fox on one of Australia's largest lychee farms. This was the first case to be brought under the federal Environment Protection and Biological Conservation Act 1999 (Cth) (the EPBC Act). His honour Justice Branson granted an injunction restraining operation of the grid. The case demonstrated the power of third party standing under the EPBC Act and broadened the regulation of activities outside of World Heritage property if likely to have a 'significant impact' on world heritage values. The case also resulted in wide-ranging law reform and environmental protection including the Queensland government banning the use of lethal electric grids and the Federal government listed the spectacled flying-fox as vulnerable. A more detailed summary of the history of the case and its legal implications can be found at Environmental Law Australia.

== Legal education ==
The EDO helps build the community's legal skills and knowledge, empowering them to facilitate public participation in environmental decision making. The organisation also runs workshops, and produce plain-English fact sheets, handbooks, and bulletins.

== Law reform ==
Policy and law reform is an important part of the EDO's work. While the EDO does not campaign on particular environmental issues, the EDO frequently puts forward proposals suggesting ways that the law can be improved.

== See also ==
- Environmental Defenders Office (EDO Ltd)
- Queensland Conservation Council (QCC)
- World Wildlife Fund
- Ecologically sustainable development
- environmental law
