= Edo (surname) =

Edo is a surname. Notable people with the surname include:

- Ángel Edo (born 1970), Spanish cyclist
- Ariadna Edo Beltrán (born 1998), Spanish paralympic swimmer
- Ini Edo (born 1982), Nigerian actress
- Luís Andrés Edo (1925–2009), Spanish militant and historian
- Teo Edo (born 1979), Spanish swimmer
- Yuma Edo (born 1993), Japanese swimmer

== See also ==
- Edo (given name)
