= Woodside Energy =

Australian oil and gas company

Woodside Energy Group Ltd.

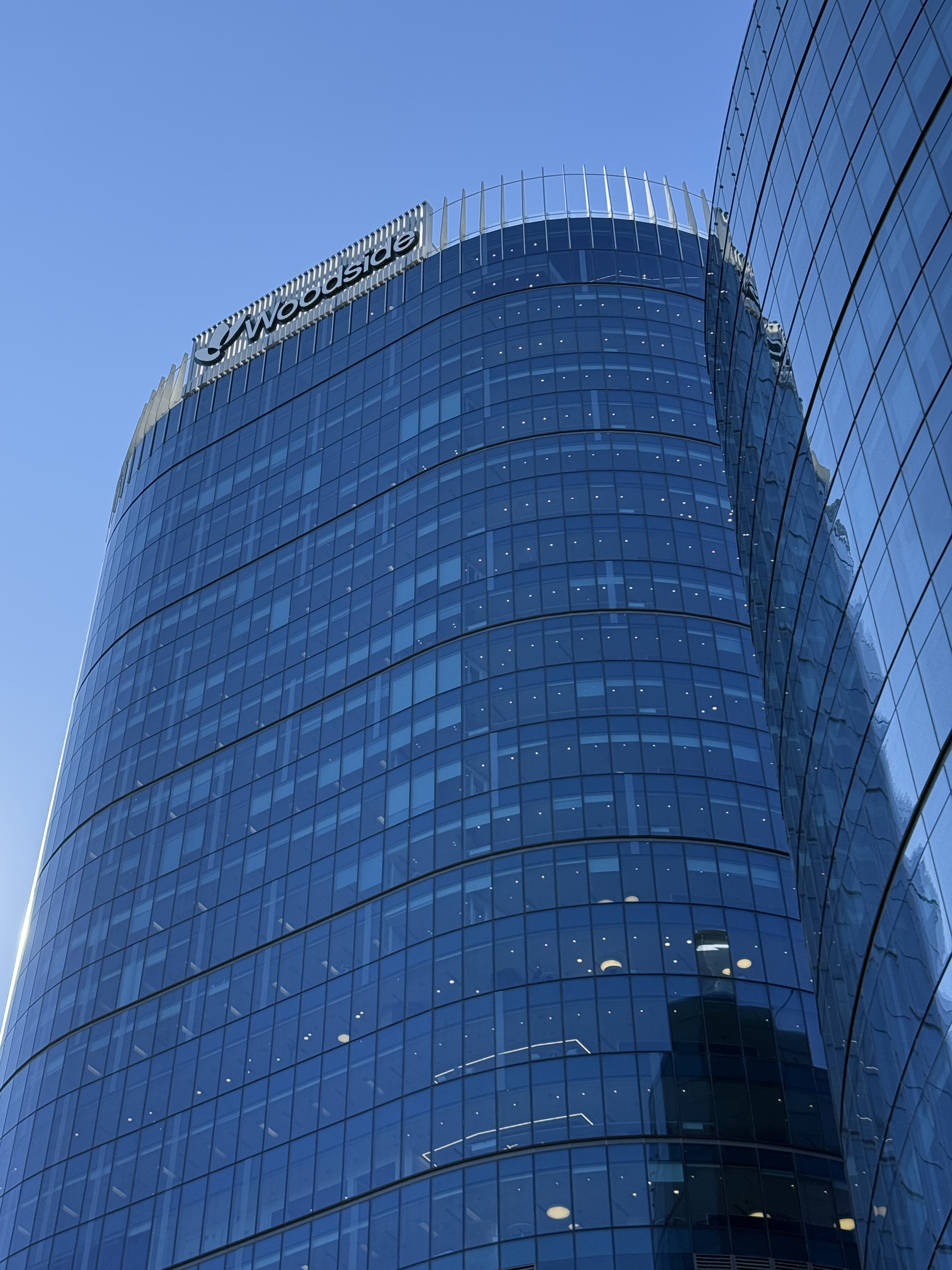
- Woodside Head Office in Perth, Australia
- Formerly: Woodside Petroleum Ltd.
- Type: Public
- Traded as: ASX: WDS; NYSE: WDS
- Industry: Oil and gas
- Predecessor: BHP Petroleum (merger); Tellurian Inc. (acquisition)
- Founded: 26 July 1954; 72 years ago
- Headquarters: Mia Yellagonga; Perth, Western Australia
- Key people: Liz Westcott (CEO); Richard Goyder (Chair)
- Products: Petroleum; LNG
- Production output: 193.9 MMbbl (30.83×10^{6} m^{3}) of oil equivalent (2024)
- Revenue: US$13.18 billion (2024)
- Net income: US$3.57 billion (2024)
- Number of employees: 4,718 (2024)
- Website: woodside.com

Woodside Energy Group Ltd (formerly Woodside Petroleum Ltd) is an Australian petroleum exploration and production company. Woodside is the operator of oil and gas production in Australia and also Australia's largest independent dedicated oil and gas company. It is a public company listed on the Australian Securities Exchange and has its headquarters in Perth, Western Australia. In the 2025 Forbes Global 2000, Woodside was ranked as the 494th-largest public company in the world.

== History ==
Woodside was incorporated on 26 July 1954. It was originally established as Woodside (Lakes Entrance) Oil Co NL, a no liability company (NL), and named after the small town of Woodside, Victoria. The company was floated by accountant Rees Withers, whose firm serviced a number of small exploration companies in Gippsland where Australia's first oil field had been discovered. The company initially struggled to raise funds after a lack of initial success. In 1956, stockbroker Geoff Donaldson, who had underwritten the initial share offer, joined Woodside as chairman. He played a key role in keeping the company afloat in its early years.

Woodside initially focused its exploration activities on Victoria's Gippsland Basin. In 1962 the company recruited Nicholas Boutakoff as chief geologist, who turned the company's activities towards Western Australia. He correctly hypothesised that the North West Shelf contained petroleum reserves, and in 1962 Woodside applied for exploration licences over a large offshore area. Woodside subsequently joined up with Shell and Burmah Oil to form the original North West Shelf Venture. BHP later replaced Burmah, and with Shell, each became a 40% shareholder in Woodside in 1985. BHP reduced its shareholding to 10% in July 1990. In October 1994, BHP sold its remaining shares while Shell sold down to 34%. In 1995, Woodside moved its head office from Melbourne to Perth.

In 1998, Woodside and the North West Shelf Joint Ventures executed a retrospective Indigenous Land Use Agreement for the North West Shelf Project area, which includes the Karratha Gas Plant on the Burrup Peninsula (Murujuga). This agreement is between the North West Shelf JV and the Ngarluma Yindjibarndi Foundation Ltd (NYFL). This is a non-royalty agreement. Woodside is also a party to the Burrup and Maitland Industrial Estates Agreement (BMIEA) for operations areas including the Pluto Gas Plant. The Traditional Owner parties to the BMIEA are represented by the Murujuga Aboriginal Corporation (MAC). According to NYFL and MAC, Woodside does not pay royalties under these agreements, meaning Woodside is one of the few resource companies that does not pay royalties to Traditional Owners.

In 2001 Shell sought to buy out the remaining portion of the company that it did not already own at the time; however, the takeover move was blocked by Treasurer of Australia, Peter Costello, on national interest grounds. In November 2010, Shell reduced its 34% stake to 24%. In November 2017, Shell sold its remaining shares.

In August 2021, Woodside entered into an agreement with BHP to merge the latter's oil and gas assets with Woodside. The deal is subject to regulatory and shareholder approval and has been described by environmentalists as 'a disastrous outcome for Woodside shareholders and [the] climate'.

In May 2022, the merger with the BHP oil and gas assets was approved by approximately 98% of Woodside shareholders. As of June 2022, the merger was completed and the combined entity was listed on the New York Stock Exchange and the London Stock Exchange.

Woodside agreed to buy American natural gas company, Tellurian Inc., for a total enterprise value of US$1.2 billion in July 2024. The following month, Woodside announced it would acquire a "blue ammonia" project in Texas from OCI Global for US$2.35 billion.

== Business overview ==
Woodside has exploration, development and operating activities in Australia and a number of international regions including Canada, United States, Senegal, South Korea, New Zealand, Myanmar, Cameroon, Gabon, Morocco and Ireland. Within Australia Woodside operates or is developing a number of liquefied natural gas projects. The company also operates the Enfield, Vincent and Pyrenees oil fields offshore from Exmouth in Western Australia.

=== Scarborough project ===
Scarborough is the name of the gas field, 375 km (233 mi) off the Pilbara coast. The project includes a floating production unit, the drilling of 13 wells, and a 430 km (270 mi) pipeline to transport the gas to the onshore Pluto LNG processing facility near Karratha, which will be expanded.

A 2021 study found estimated that the full Scarborough-Pluto project will emit almost 1.4 billion tonnes of greenhouse gases over its lifetime. That's over three times Australia's current annual emissions, and around 14 times WA's annual emissions. A climate attribution study in the peer-reviewed journal showed that the emissions from the Scarborough project are directly linked to a temperature rise, leading to heat waves causing 484 heatwave deaths in Europe alone. The emissions from the Scarborough project have been attributed to expose more than half a million people to unprecedented heat, and kill 16 million corals in each bleaching event.

Production is expected to begin in 2026. The project has received environmental approval.

=== Sunrise LNG development ===
The Greater Sunrise gas development lies in the Timor Sea north of Australia and includes the Sunrise and Troubadour fields, which were discovered in 1974. Greater Sunrise is located about 450 kilometres (280 mi) north-west of Darwin and 150 kilometres (93 mi) south-east of East Timor. Approximately 80% of the fields lie within Australian waters, with the remainder in jointly administered waters. The Greater Sunrise fields have a total contingent dry gas resource of 5.13 trillion cubic feet (145 billion cubic metres) and 225.9 million barrels (35.92 million cubic metres) of condensate. The Sunrise JV participants are Woodside (operator) (33.4%), ConocoPhillips (30%), Shell (26.6%) and Osaka Gas (10%).

In April 2010 Shell's floating liquefied natural gas technology was selected by the Sunrise Joint Venture for developing the Greater Sunrise gas fields in the Timor Sea. The Woodside-operated JV is now seeking to engage regulators on the concept selection process.

=== Australia Oil ===
Woodside owns and operates a number of oil developments off Western Australia, including the Ngujima-Yin FPSO, the Pyrenees FPSO, and the Okha FPSO.

=== Burrup Hub ===
Woodside Energy Group also has Burrup Hub, the largest fossil fuel project currently proposed in Australia, involving the extraction of six untapped gas fields and the drilling of 84 wells off the Western Australian coast.

== Criticism ==
The construction of the Woodside-operated North West Shelf project in the 1980s included the destruction of more than 5,000 sacred rock art sites. Ngarda-ngarli, the Traditional Owners, were blocked from protecting sites at the North West Shelf site, and consent was never provided for the construction of the Gas Plant, as per letters and records from Traditional Owners and archaeologists. Letters from Traditional Owners in 2025 show consent was never provided, and had still not been obtained in 2025, despite Woodside publicly committing to the United Nations Declaration on the Right of Indigenous Peoples (UNDRIP). The final commonwealth approval for the extension of the North West Shelf oil and gas project until 2070 was ironically provided the day prior to the 28th anniversary of the UN adopting UNDRIP. This was despite Traditional Owners publicly stating they had not consented to the original construction nor the extension of the Gas Plant.

In February 2006, the Mauritanian military junta led by Col. Ely Ould Mohamed Vall denounced amendments to an oil contract made by former President Maaouya Ould Sid'Ahmed Taya with Woodside Petroleum. In 2004, Woodside had agreed to invest US$600 million in developing Mauritania's Chinguetti offshore oil project. The "controversial" amendments, which Mauritanian authorities declared had been signed "outside the legal framework of normal practice, to the great detriment of our country", could cost Mauritania up to US$200 million a year. In June 2006, the Australian Federal Police were investigating Woodside for allegations of bribery and corruption in Mauritania.

In 2006–2007, as part of the Pluto LNG project, Woodside faced opposition over plans to build an onshore processing plant on the Burrup Peninsula in Western Australia, as the site is home to significant petroglyphs up to 30,000 years old.

It has been suggested that intense lobbying by Woodside Petroleum contributed to the coalition Howard government's initial decision against emissions trading in August 2000. The company also opposed the Rudd Labor government's Carbon Pollution Reduction Scheme in 2009.

Woodside is among six companies accused of making deceptive public statements in an attempt to get free carbon permits. The Australian Conservation Foundation says the companies exaggerated in public, but told a different story to their shareholders and investors. In June 2009, the ACF lodged an official complaint with the Federal consumer affairs watchdog asking that the matter be investigated. The Australian Competition & Consumer Commission took no action against the companies.

In April 2011 Australia's Fair Work Ombudsman began an investigation into claims that foreign workers were underpaid on two North West Shelf oil rigs operated by Woodside Petroleum. In April 2013, the Federal Court in WA heard allegations that the workers were paid less than A$3 an hour to work on the oil rigs. Documents tendered to the court claimed that the four men worked as painters on Woodside rigs on the North West Shelf off northern WA from July 2009 until early 2011.

In the corporation's annual offshore performance report, published in mid-2013, the failure of an oil mist detector at Woodside Petroleum's Vincent oilfield in Western Australia was caused by faulty wiring and inadequately designed equipment. The issue was identified during a visit by a third party at Woodside's largest single source of oil production.

In April 2016, Woodside concealed a 10,500 litres (2,800 US gal) oil spill off the coast of Western Australia, which went on for two months without anyone from the company noticing. Woodside's responsibility only came to light after intense public pressure. In March 2019, Woodside led a lobbying effort to force the Western Australia EPA to abandon new guidelines to protect the climate. The Australian Centre for Corporate Responsibility described the affair as a ‘week of shame.’

In mid-2020, Woodside tried to avoid decommissioning costs by convincing regulators that dumping all the equipment from its Echo-Yodel field, including 400 tonnes of plastic, under the pretence of the waste being an 'artificial reef'. The same year, after calls to pay over A$200 million to clean up an old gas processing facility they had decommissioned, Woodside convinced the government to instead grant them millions of taxpayer dollars, through a shadowy limited tender process, to ‘consult’ on the clean up. Woodside have attracted condemnation for their role in the wiretapping of the East Timor government in order to "force East Timor, one of the poorest countries in the world, to surrender most of the revenues" to Woodside.

In 2023, Woodside continued to face criticism for the sale of the Northern Endeavour in 2016, to a company that then collapsed 4 years later, leaving responsibility for decommissioning to the Australian Government.

In mid October 2026, Greenpeace Australia Pacific activists boarded a floating production platform at Woodside Energy's Scarborough gas project off the coast of Western Australia. The group said that the protest aimed to stop the Browse offshore gas development that would endanger marine life around Scott Reef. Woodside temporarily halted early commissioning work on the facility while the protesters were on board, and police laid charges against two of the activists for "interfering with operations of offshore petroleum installations", an offence punishable by up to 10 years of imprisonment.

=== James Price Point gas industrial complex ===
The "Save The Kimberley" campaign was an organised protest against Woodside's involvement with a proposal to construct the James Price Point gas industrial complex in Western Australia's Kimberley region. A protest concert was held at Federation Square in October 2012, followed by a second event in early 2013 at Esplanade Park, Fremantle that featured Bob Brown, former leader of the Australian Greens political party. A march to protest the proposed gas refinery construction at James Price Point accompanied the Fremantle concert, and campaign supporters were photographed with banners and placards. Community blockades of preliminary construction work at the site, as well as mass submissions and actions in the courts, delayed the project's progress.

The proposal was eventually abandoned in April 2013 because of protestors and political resistance, including from some local Aboriginal people, but the A$1.5 billion social benefits package that had been brokered between the Kimberley Land Council and Woodside, together with its joint-venture partners and the Barnett government, remained an ongoing issue.

Former head of the Kimberley Land Council Wayne Bergmann, who brokered the deal prior to his resignation, controversially demanded in the media: "[We have] no legal right to that deal; it was broached politically and now they [Woodside, the joint-venture partners and the state government] need to honour the bargain."

As of 15 April 2013, Woodside had paid A$3.7 million to Aboriginal organisations in accordance with the agreement and a Woodside spokesperson stated that the corporation would "continue to support a range of voluntary social investment activities in the West Kimberley".

Some shareholders have argued that the directors of Woodside have breached their duties under the Corporations Act by authorizing any payments because the project did not proceed and the local Aboriginal leaders were just being gifted free money that would never be appropriately accounted for, and would not assist any truly disadvantaged person to change their lives for the better.

=== Scarborough project ===
The Scarborough-Pluto project has been criticised as not being compatible with Australia's goal of limiting global temperature rise to 1.5 °C this century under the Paris Agreement.

In November 2021, around 50 local people rallied at Karratha to protest against one of the biggest oil and gas developments ever undertaken in Australia, by Woodside and BHP, known as the Scarborough project; The Murujuga Aboriginal Corporation has no role in approving such industrial projects, but there is research being undertaken as to whether increased emissions would affect the ancient rock art of the Dampier Rock Art Precinct on Murujuga.

In June 2022, the Environmental Defenders Office (EDO) on behalf of the Australian Conservation Foundation (ACF) sought an injunction against Woodside's Scarborough gas project due to its potential climate impacts on the Great Barrier Reef. As of August 2024, Woodside now has all primary environmental approvals in place after the ACF agreed to dismiss its legal challenge. By October 2025, there were two more court cases in place against the environmental impact and cultural losses from fossil fuel pollution resulting from this project.

=== Additional protests ===
Woodside has faced additional opposition from environmental groups.

In 2023, iconic Australian artworks were vandalised with the Woodside logo as a protest against the company's "ongoing desecration of Murujuga rock art" in the Burrup area. Other actions have been staged at the company headquarters, including further vandalism and the use of stink bombs. The aim of campaigning, including such actions, was described by a member of Disrupt Burrup Hub as 'to brand Woodside’s Burrup Hub as the most toxic fossil fuel project in the country, and develop messaging around that to create public awareness of the Burrup Hub and its impacts, and to convert that into political pressure to prevent its further expansion. Some of the actions taken by these groups have faced significant backlash, such as a protest staged at CEO Meg O'Neill's private residence, which was widely condemned by academic, political and business leaders as "unacceptable" conduct.

Further media coverage covered Woodside's strong support for the 2023 Indigenous Voice referendum, while also not committing to follow its advice.

=== Pride protest ===
Woodside Energy's involvement in Pride events has been a subject of controversy within the LGBTQ+ community. In 2019, the company became a major sponsor of Perth's PrideFEST, a decision that drew criticism from activists who argued that corporate sponsorship undermines the radical spirit of the Pride movement.

The Rainbow Rebellion group staged a protest in Perth's city centre in 2019, criticising Pride WA for prioritising corporate partnerships over political activism. They argued that corporations like Woodside Energy were using Pride events to distract from their harmful environmental practices.

The Western Australian Greens party has also expressed concerns about Woodside's involvement in Pride events. In a letter to Pride WA, party leader Brad Pettitt called on the organisation to reconsider its association with the fossil fuel company. Pettit emphasised the devastating impact of climate change on marginalised communities and urged Pride WA to prioritise sponsors who are actively working to address these issues.
