= Edo Šen =

Croatian architect (1877–1949)

- Born: 10 March 1877; Zagreb, Austro-Hungarian Monarchy, (now Croatia)
- Died: 16 June 1949 (aged 72); Zagreb, SFR Yugoslavia
- Education: Vienna University of Technology
- Occupation: Architect
- Buildings: Croatia osiguranje palace (1909); Faculty of Architecture, University of Zagreb (1938)

Edo Šen (born Edo Schön; 1877–1949) was a Croatian Jewish architect notable for creating the foundation of the modern Croatian architecture.

== Early life ==
Šen was born in Zagreb on 10 March 1877. After high school graduation in 1894, he went to Vienna, Austria where he studied at the Vienna University of Technology. Šen graduated in 1900. After graduation, he worked in the studio of Slovenian architect Max Fabiani.

== Career ==
In 1901 Šen returned to Zagreb and started to work as a servant in the City council Civil engineering office. There he led technical tasks related to building and construction control. In 1905 Šen co-founded the Croatian architects club (Klub hrvatskih arhitekta). From 1908 to 1919 he was a professor at the Technical School in Zagreb. He was one of the founders, in 1919, of the Faculty of Architecture, University of Zagreb and one of its first professors. Later he was elected rector of the Faculty of Architecture, University of Zagreb.

Šen's work is strongly influenced by historical eclecticism. His early eclecticism is characterized by the idiosyncratic elements on the main facade of the Croatia osiguranje palace in Tomáš Garrigue Masaryk street, Zagreb. After 1918 his work shows the influence of the Modern architecture, but that influence was not applied dogmatically. Representative public buildings, such as the Institute of Forestry (1926) in Božidar Adžija street, Zagreb, is massed in large cubic forms expressing restrained monumentality. Other Šen's realization of that era are apartment buildings "Mervar" (former "Society humanity home") in Petrinjska street and residential building "Bezuk" in Boškovićeva street, all in Zagreb. During his career he worked with the Croatian architect Juraj Denzler. In 1930 Šen started to work with another Croatian architect, Milovan Kovačević. Kovačević was also his assistant at the Faculty of Architecture, University of Zagreb. Šen died in Zagreb on 16 June 1949.

== Gallery ==
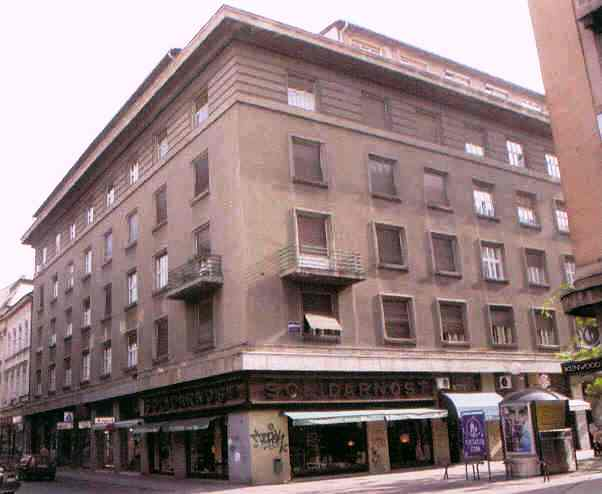
Residential building Vasić, Varšavska street 6, Zagreb.

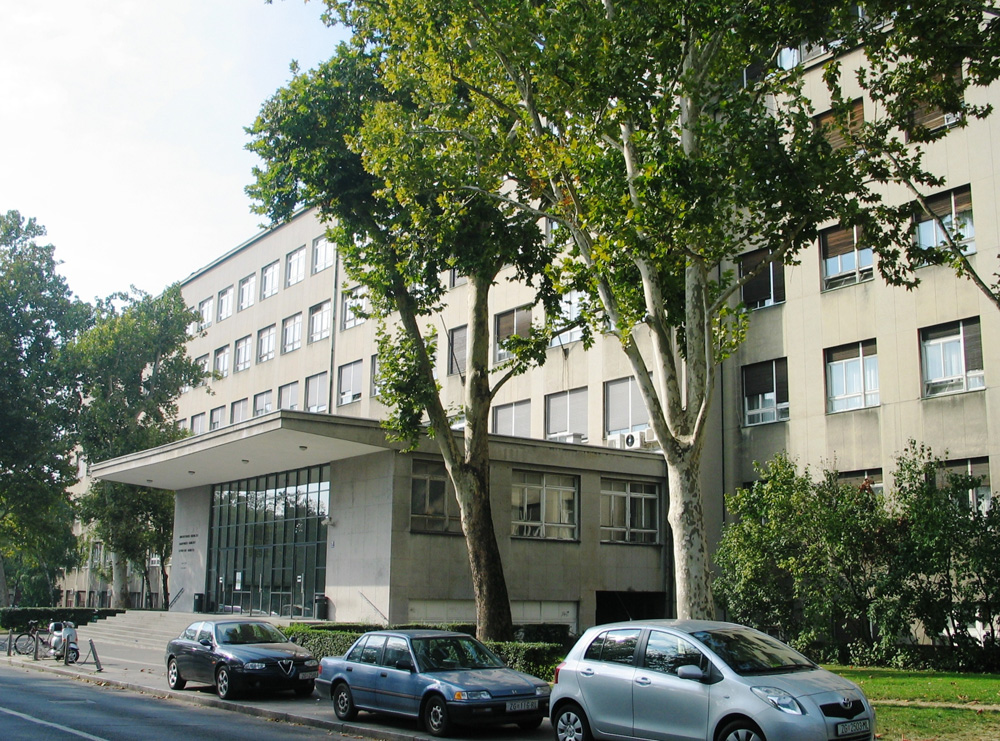
Faculty of Architecture, University of Zagreb, Kačićeva street 26, Zagreb.

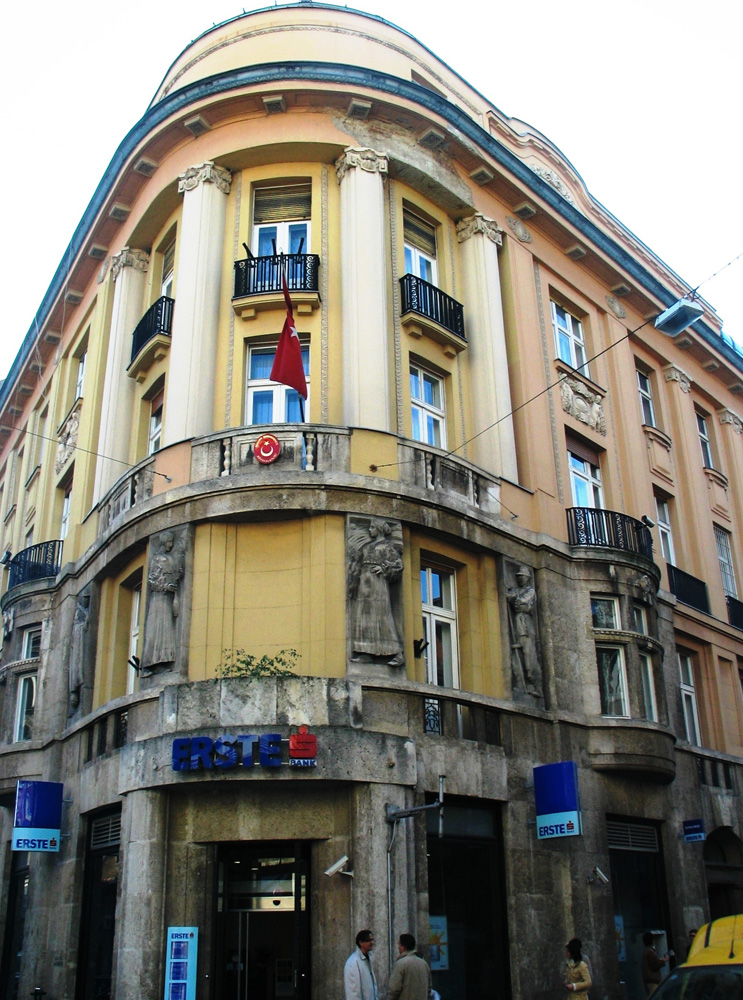
Croatia osiguranje palace, corner of Preradovićeva - Masarykova street, Zagreb.

== Bibliography ==
- Goldstein, Ivo (2004). Židovi u Zagrebu 1918 - 1941. Zagreb: Novi Liber. ISBN 953-6045-23-0.
- Premerl, Tomislav (1990). Hrvatska moderna arhitektura između dva rata. Zagreb: Nakladni zavod Matice hrvatske.
- Galović, Krešimir (1998). Arhitekt Edo Šen : skice i crteži. Zagreb: Biblioteka Psefizma. ISBN 953-6646-00-5.
