= Peter McClellan =

Australian judge

The Honourable Peter McClellan AM KC

Chief Royal Commissioner of the Royal Commission into Institutional Responses to Child Sexual Abuse
- In office 11 January 2013 – 15 December 2017 Serving with Bob Atkinson, Jennifer Coate, Robert Fitzgerald, Helen Milroy, Andrew Murray
- Nominated by: Julia Gillard
- Appointed by: Quentin Bryce (Governor-General)

Judge of the New South Wales Court of Appeal
- In office 21 February 2013 – 8 February 2018

Chief Judge at Common Law of the Supreme Court of New South Wales
- In office 1 September 2005 – 21 February 2013
- Appointed by: Marie Bashir (Governor of NSW)

Chief Judge of the Land and Environment Court of New South Wales
- In office 25 August 2003 – 1 September 2005
- Preceded by: Maria Pearlman
- Succeeded by: Brian Preston

Judge of the Supreme Court of New South Wales
- In office 29 January 2001 – 25 August 2003
- Nominated by: Bob Debus
- Appointed by: Jim Spigelman, CJ

Personal details
- Born: Peter David McClellan Sydney, New South Wales, Australia
- Spouse: Jayne Jagot
- Children: Nick, Jo, Jack and Will
- Education: Normanhurst Boys' High School; University of Sydney
- Occupation: Judge

Peter David McClellan AM KC is a retired judge of the New South Wales Court of Appeal who served between February 2013 and February 2018. McClellan was the Chief Royal Commissioner of the Royal Commission into Institutional Responses to Child Sexual Abuse from January 2013 to December 2017. He was previously the Chief Judge in Common Law in the Supreme Court, a position to which he was appointed in 2005.

== Early life and education ==
McClellan grew up on Sydney's Upper North Shore, and received his secondary school education at Normanhurst Boys High School. Fellow Supreme Court Justice Ian Harrison (who also attended the school) said that, "that school was instrumental in assisting your Honour to overcome adolescent difficulties you had with low esteem, lack of confidence and self doubt".

McClellan later studied arts and law at the University of Sydney, where he graduated with a Bachelor of Arts in 1971 and a Bachelor of Laws in 1974.

== Career ==
McClellan was admitted to practise law as a solicitor of the Supreme Court of New South Wales on 26 July 1974, and worked for a short time as a solicitor at Hall and Hall. He was called to the Bar on 2 May 1975. His legal practice primarily consisted of planning and environmental law, administrative law, valuation and water-related matters, as well as advising government agencies. From 1984 to 1985, he held the role of Counsel Assisting the Maralinga Royal Commission into British nuclear testing in Australia. Also that year, he was appointed Queen's Counsel. He later served as Chairman of the New South Wales State Government Inquiry into Swimming Pool Safety from 1988 to 1991, Acting and Assistant Commissioner of the Independent Commission Against Corruption from 1992 to 1993, and supervised the statutory review of the Sydney Casino licence in 1997 and 2000.

In 1998, McClellan was the Chairman of the Sydney Water Inquiry. On 29 January 2001, McClellan was appointed a Justice of the Supreme Court of New South Wales. From 25 August 2003, McClellan was the Chief Judge of the Land and Environment Court of New South Wales, leaving this role on 1 September 2005 due to his re-appointment to the Supreme Court.

McClellan has also worked as an Assistant Commissioner at the Independent Commission Against Corruption and as an Acting Judge of the District Court of New South Wales. In addition, he has held the position of New South Wales President of the National Environmental Law Association.

On 11 January 2013, Justice McClellan was announced as the head of the Royal Commission into Institutional Responses to Child Sexual Abuse. He presented the commission's final report and recommendations on 15 December 2017.

McClellan retired from the Supreme Court on 8 February 2018.

== Honours and personal life ==
In 2011 McClellan was appointed a Member of the Order of Australia for service to the judiciary through the Supreme Court of New South Wales, to environmental law, and to legal education. In 2018 he was awarded the Human Rights Medal.

McClellan is married to Justice Jayne Jagot of the High Court of Australia.

Legal offices
Preceded by Mahla Pearlman	Chief Judge of the Land and Environment Court (NSW); 2003–2005	Succeeded by Brian Preston
