= The Sunrise Project =

Charity based in Sydney, Australia

- Type: Nonprofit
- Purpose: Environmental advocacy
- Headquarters: Sydney, Australia
- Website: https://sunriseproject.org/

The Sunrise Project is a global charity based in Sydney, Australia that is focused on action around the "imperative of climate justice". The Sunrise Project's mission is to "scale social movements to drive the transition from fossil fuels to renewable energy as swiftly as possible."

The Sunrise Project was founded by John Hepburn, an engineer who had formerly provided services for the coal, oil, and nuclear industries. Prior to founding The Sunrise Project, John worked for a decade at Greenpeace Australia Pacific, leading national, regional, and global campaigns. He also co-founded Friends of the Earth Brisbane and several nonprofit recycling businesses, including Reverse Garbage Co-op Ltd., which won numerous small business awards and led to him being awarded a Churchill Fellowship in 2002.

== Operating model and objectives ==
The Sunrise Project takes a "directed network" approach to campaigning that builds the power of social movements to win large-scale change that would not be possible by individual organisations acting alone. In order to achieve its charitable purpose, The Sunrise Project acts as a hybrid campaigning and funding organisation that works with a network of smaller organizations focused on local issues.

The Sunrise Project is a global network of independent organisations that share a common mission and common values. The Sunrise Project currently comprises:

- The Sunrise Project Australia Limited (Sunrise Australia), incorporated in Australia
- The Sunrise Project International Stichting (Sunrise International)
- The Sunrise Project Inc. (Sunrise Inc.), incorporated in the United States

Each organisation is a fully independent legal entity with its own board of experienced directors who bring deep expertise across climate change, social movements, law, finance, organisational leadership and governance. The Sunrise Project's current program in Australia focuses on "transforming Australia from laggard to leader on climate action, and shifting global finance out of fossil fuels."

== Funding and Resources ==
The Sunrise Project raises funds from donors who share their mission, and it then grants funds to other non-government organisations and community groups in line with their objectives. The Sunrise Project group (across all entities) declared funding of $129 Million (AUD) in its 2023 annual report. Its website claims that the project "typically re-grant 2/3 of our revenue". Sunrise Australia has 64.4 full-time equivalent staff and has grown from a declared income of $4.05 Million (AUD) in 2013 to $75 Million (AUD) in 2023.

The Sunrise Project has declared funding support from a range of foundations and institutions, including Boundless Earth (founded by Mike Cannon-Brookes), ClimateWorks Foundation, the McKinnon Family Foundation, the Oak Foundation, the Zegar Family Foundation, the ACME Foundation, the Graeme Wood Foundation, the Foundation for International Law for the Environment, the Laudes Foundation, the Danish KR Foundation, the Sequoia Climate Foundation and Bloomberg Philanthropies.

It contributes funding to Australian political change to lobby for environmental protections.

== Controversy ==
In 2015, two emails forwarded to Hillary Clinton’s campaign chairman, John Podesta – and published by WikiLeaks – showed that one of The Sunrise Project's funders is a large US-based charitable trust, the Sandler Foundation. The leaked emails also revealed that The Sunrise Project’s executive directors were actively seeking ways to keep the identities of their financial supporters a secret.

The then chief executive of the Minerals Council of Australia condemned the effort and called for a “rethink of the oversight of environmental groups that operate as charities and that have tax-deductible recipient status."
