= Land and Environment Court of New South Wales =

Law court in New South Wales, Australia

- Established: 14 April 1980; 46 years ago
- Jurisdiction: New South Wales, Australia
- Location: Sydney
- Authorised by: Parliament of New South Wales via the Land and Environment Court Act 1979 (NSW)
- Appeals to: New South Wales Court of Criminal Appeal; New South Wales Court of Appeal
- Appeals from: Local Court of New South Wales (with respect to an environmental offence under the Crimes (Appeal and Review) Act 2001 (NSW))
- Website: lec.nsw.gov.au

Chief Judge
- Currently: Brian Preston
- Since: 14 November 2005

The Land and Environment Court of New South Wales is a court within the Australian court hierarchy established pursuant to the Land and Environment Court Act 1979 (NSW) to hear environmental, development, building and planning disputes. The Court's jurisdiction, confined to the state of New South Wales, Australia, includes merits review, judicial review, civil enforcement, criminal prosecution, criminal appeals and civil claims about planning, environmental, land, mining and other legislation.

== History ==
The Court was established on 1 April 1980 as the world's first environmental court that was also a superior court of record.

A Parliamentary review in 2001 noted "It is evident that there is some dissatisfaction within sections of the community about the role and operations of the Court".

In Environmental Protection and Legal Change (Federation Press, 1992) Wilcox J recounts how he helped draft a submission on behalf of the Bar Council recommending that the proposed Land and Environment Court (LEC) be established as part of the NSW Supreme Court. Wilcox J notes that while Paul Landa (then Minister of Planning and Environment) did carefully review the submissions and follow many of the suggestions, he decided to establish the LEC as a separate court. Shortly after this decision was made, Wilcox J ran into Landa. Wilcox J recalls:

I asked him why he was not going to make the [LEC] part of the Supreme Court. He replied: "What, and lose the power to appoint the judges?" The point, of course, was that as Minister for Planning and Environment, he would have administrative control of a separate court, but the Supreme Court was under the administrative control of the Attorney General. ... This is why the [LEC] is not part of the Supreme Court. There is no more intellectually respectable reason than a Minister's desire for power. (emphasis added)

== Structure and jurisdiction ==
The Court is a superior court of record. It consists of a Chief Judge, several Judges, and Commissioners. The New South Wales Court of Criminal Appeal and the New South Wales Court of Appeal, both divisions of the Supreme Court of New South Wales, may hear appeals from the Court, depending on the nature of case. Appellants on constitutional issues may seek special leave for the matter to be heard before the High Court of Australia in certain circumstances.

The Court has appellate jurisdiction over the Local Court of New South Wales with respect to an environmental offence under the Crimes (Appeal and Review) Act 2001 (NSW).

== Current composition ==
Judges have the same rank, title, status and precedence as the Judges of the Supreme Court of New South Wales. Judges preside over all Aboriginal land claims matters, most land tenure and compensation matters, and can hear matters in all other Classes of the Court's jurisdiction.

The Judges, in order of seniority, are as follows:

Name	Title	Term began	Term ended	Time in office	Notes
Justice Brian Preston	Chief Judge	14 November 2005	present	20 years, 239 days	
Justice Nicola Pain	Judges	18 March 2002	present	24 years, 115 days	
Justice Rachel Pepper	Judges	1 May 2009	present	17 years, 71 days	
Justice John Robson	Judges	5 July 2016	present	10 years, 6 days	
Justice Sandra Duggan	Judges	10 September 2019	present	6 years, 304 days	
Justice Sarah Pritchard	Judges	15 November 2022	present	3 years, 238 days	
Justice Richard Beasley	Judges	17 March 2025	present	1 year, 116 days	

== Past Judicial officers and decision makers ==
=== Past Chief Judges ===
Name	Title	Term ended	Time in office	Notes
Justice Jim McClelland	14 April 1980	2 June 1985	5 years, 49 days	
Justice Jerrold Cripps	3 June 1985	1 April 1992	6 years, 303 days	
Justice Mahla Pearlman AO	6 April 1992	3 July 2003	11 years, 88 days	
Justice Peter McClellan	25 August 2003	1 September 2005	2 years, 7 days	

=== Former Judges ===
- The Honourable Justice Ted Perrignon
- The Honourable Justice Noel Hemmings
- The Honourable Justice Charles Bannon
- The Honourable Justice Paul Stein
- The Honourable Justice Dennis Cowdroy OAM
- The Honourable Justice Neal Bignold
- The Honourable Justice Angus Talbot
- The Honourable Justice Jayne Jagot
- The Honourable Justice David Lloyd
- The Honourable Justice Peter Biscoe
- The Honourable Justice Malcolm Craig
- The Honourable Justice Terry Sheahan AO
- The Honourable Justice Timothy Moore

== See also ==
- List of New South Wales courts and tribunals
- Warden Court, a predecessor to the Land and Environment Court of New South Wales
- NSW Threatened Species Conservation Act 1995 (TSC Act)
