= Environmental Defender's Office NSW =

Former non-governmental organisation in Australia

The Environmental Defender's Office (NSW) in Sydney, New South Wales, was one of nine EDO offices located across Australia, formerly known as the Australian Network of EDOs (ANEDO).

In 2019, eight EDOs agreed to merge and form a single national organisation Environmental Defender Office (EDO Ltd).

== Background ==
The Environmental Defender's Office (NSW) was a community legal centre specialising in public interest environmental law. The EDO provides legal advice and representation in public interest environmental law matters. In addition to the provision of legal services, the Office takes an active role in law reform and the formulation of policy, provides technical and scientific advice to help the community understand environmental documents and carries out community programs on environmental law.

The Environmental Defender's Office has an active international program, and contributes in a wide range of environmental advocacy activities, with particular focus on the Asia-Pacific region.

The Environmental Defender's Office (NSW) has identified 'priority areas' that include climate change, environmental planning and development, biodiversity conservation, natural resource management, environmental justice as well as corporate social responsibility.

== Key cases ==
The EDO has brought proceedings in a variety of cases involving disputes of public interest environmental law. The following are recent key cases EDO NSW has run:

- Mackay Conservation Group v Commonwealth of Australia and Adani Mining (2016)

The EDO acted on behalf of the Mackay Conservation Group, and successfully challenged the Federal Environment Ministers approval of the Carmichael coal mine on the Great Barrier Reef. The case alleged the Australian Environment Minister, Greg Hunt, failed to take into account a number of factors, required by law, when approving the Carmichael Mine. The case was successful on the ground that the Minister failed to take into account, as required by the Environment Protection and Biodiversity Conservation Act 1999, his Department’s approved conservation advice for two threatened species, the Yakka Skink and the Ornamental Snake.

- Humane Society International Inc (HSI) v Kyodo Senpaku Kaisha Ltd (Kyodo) (2008)

EDO acted for Humane Society International and sought a declaration that Kyodo breached the Environment Protection and Biodiversity Conservation Act 1999 by whaling in the Australian Whale Sanctuary adjacent to Antarctica and an injunction to prevent the killing of whales in this area. His Honour Justice Allsop made a declaration that Kyodo was in breach of Australian law and granted HSI an injunction to restrain Kyodo from further breaches of the EPBC Act. In 2015 Kyodo Senpaku Kaisha Ltd was found guilty of wilful contempt of court and fined A$1,000,000.

- Minister for Planning v Walker (2008)

Acting on behalf of Jill Walker, a local resident of Sandon Point, the EDO challenged a Part 3A development approval. This case has important implications for how the Minister for Planning must deal with major projects under Part 3A of the Environmental Planning and Assessment Act 1979. Justice Biscoe reviewed the principles of ESD as well as US and Australian case law on climate change. He found that the Minister had failed to consider ESD by failing to consider whether the impacts of the proposed development would be compounded by climate change.

- The Hub Action Group Inc v The Minister of Planning and Orange City Council (2008)

The EDO successfully represented The Hub Action Group, a group of local residents opposed to a proposal to develop ‘the Hub' regional waste facility on agricultural land near Molong. Justice Preston found that the proposal was not sustainable, partly because it was likely to adversely affect the long term use of the area and sustained agricultural production.

- Anderson and Anor v Director-General of Environment and Conservation and Ors (2006)

The EDO represented Douglas and Susan Anderson, traditional owners of land at Angels Beach, East Ballina. They challenged the validity of consent issued by Director-General of the Department of Environment and Conservation that allowed the destruction of Aboriginal cultural heritage for a residential subdivision. Justice Pain ruled that the consent was invalid, due to a failure to take into account certain relevant matters as well as the Director-General’s failure to adequately apply the principles of ecologically sustainable development.

== See also ==
- EDO Ltd
- EDO Chairman Murray Wilcox
- Environmental Law
- Department of Environment and Climate Change
- Australian Youth Ambassadors for Development
- Greenpeace Australia Pacific
- World Wide Fund for Nature
- Friends of the Earth International
- United Nations Framework Convention on Climate Change
- The Wilderness Society (Australia)
