= Brian Preston =

Australian judge

The Honourable Justice Brian Preston AO FRSN SC

5th Chief Judge of the Land and Environment Court (NSW)
- Incumbent
- Assumed office 14 November 2005

Personal details
- Education: Macquarie University
- Occupation: Judge, lawyer

Brian John Preston is the Chief Judge of the Land and Environment Court of New South Wales. He was appointed on 14 November 2005.

== Career ==
Brian John Preston graduated LLB from Macquarie University in 1982.

== Career ==
Preston practised as a solicitor from 1982 to 1987, and as a barrister from 1987 to 2005.

He began his career at Stephen Jaques & Stephen, in the firm's resources group, then became associate to Mr Justice O’Leary of the Supreme Court of the Northern Territory.

Preston was principal solicitor at the Environmental Defender's Office NSW from March 1985, overseeing its official opening in May that year.

He was appointed a senior counsel (SC) by the NSW Bar Association in 1999.

On 14 November 2005, Preston was appointed Chief Judge in the Land and Environment Court of New South Wales.

== Recognition and awards ==
In 2010 Preston received an award from the Asian Environmental Compliance and Enforcement Network (AECEN) for his environmental work.

In February 2018 the Governor of New South Wales, General David Hurley, promulgated the election of Preston as a Fellow of the Royal Society of New South Wales in the NSW Government Gazette.

In 2018 Preston received an honorary Doctor of Letters from his alma mater Macquarie University, and in 2022 an honorary Doctor of Laws from Western Sydney University. He is also an adjunct professor at the Sydney, Southern Cross, and Western Sydney Universities.

He was awarded the Medal of Honor by the World Jurist Association in 2023.

Preston was appointed Officer of the Order of Australia in the 2025 Australia Day Honours.

Legal offices
Preceded by Peter McClellan	Chief Judge of the Land and Environment Court (NSW); 2005–	Incumbent
