= Australian Conservation Foundation =

Australia's national environmental organisation

Australian Conservation Foundation (ACF)
- Founded: 1966; Melbourne, Australia
- Type: Non-governmental organization
- Purpose: Advocacy, policy, research and community organising
- Location: Melbourne
- Region served: Australia
- Key people: Adam Bandt, Chief Executive Officer; Mara Bún, President
- Website: acf.org.au

The Australian Conservation Foundation (ACF) is Australia's national environmental organisation. It was launched in 1965 in response to a proposal by the World Wide Fund for Nature for a more co-ordinated approach to sustainability. One of its most high-profile campaigns has been to protect the Great Barrier Reef by classifying it as a marine park, from which mining, drilling, and trawling were banned.

== Origins ==
Discussions regarding the need for an Australian conservation organisation originated in the 1960s through the Queen of England husband Philip, a founder of the World Wide Fund for Nature pivotal in establishment of the conservation movement in Australia. The head of the World Wide Fund, Philip Crowe, visited Australia in 1965 to advocate for more meaningful conservation action, recommending federal coordination, tax deductible donations for conservation and a national wildlife survey as three important measures. The Australian Conservation Foundation was established at a meeting of founders in Canberra, with the objective of supporting "conservation policies and schemes that need special encouragement by whatever methods are most appropriate," with funding obtained by public appeal for "material as well as moral support" to its work. Sir Garfield Berwick was elected as the foundation president and governance was by a member-elected council.

== The Great Barrier Reef ==
In 1969, ACF kick-started a royal commission, which led to a ban on oil drilling on the reef. Six years later, after a national campaign by ACF and other community groups, the Australian Government declared the Great Barrier Reef a national marine park.

In the 1980s ACF successfully campaigned for the Reef's World Heritage listing.

In the early 2000s, ACF influenced the expansion of the Great Barrier Reef Marine Park. Over 3,500 submissions from ACF supporters to the Marine Park Authority saw environmentally protected areas of the reef increase from five per cent to one third of its expanse. ACF has sought to protect the reef through climate litigation, exemplified by their case against Woodside Energy regarding the Scarborough gas project, which aimed to address the potential climate impacts on the reef.

== Funding ==
The Australian Conservation Foundation reported total revenue of $18.1 million and an expenditure of $19.26m Australian in 2023. The additional expenditure was drawn from operating reserves. Approximately 90 per cent of ACF's income is received through individual donations, bequests, memberships and grants.

ACF disclosed $16.38 million raised in 2023 from donations and bequests. The ACF spends $1.3 million on acquisition of donors "through external service providers". They reported a net surplus of $3,263,972. Other sources of ACF income include rental income from the 60L Building and returns from ethical investments. The ACF reported full time equivalent staff (FTE) of 96 persons.

== Governance ==
The governing body is a board consisting of the president, two vice-presidents, four councillors and up to four co-opted members.

Presidents
1967–71	Sir Garfield Barwick
1971–76	Prince Philip, Duke of Edinburgh
1977	Sir Mark Oliphant
1978–79	H.C. Coombs
1979–84	Murray Wilcox
1985–89	J.H. Wootten
1990–94	Peter Garrett
1994–97	David Yencken
1998–2004	Peter Garrett
2004–14	Ian Lowe
2014–2018	Geoff Cousins
2017–2023	Mara Bún
2023 – present	Liana Downey

Executive Directors
1968	Donald F. McMichael
1969–73	R.D. Piesse
1974–86	Geoff Mosely
1986–92	Phillip Toyne
1992–95	Tricia Caswell
1995–97	James Downey
1997–2014	Don Henry
2014–2026	Kelly O'Shanassy
2026–present	Adam Bandt
