= Seawater desalination in Australia =

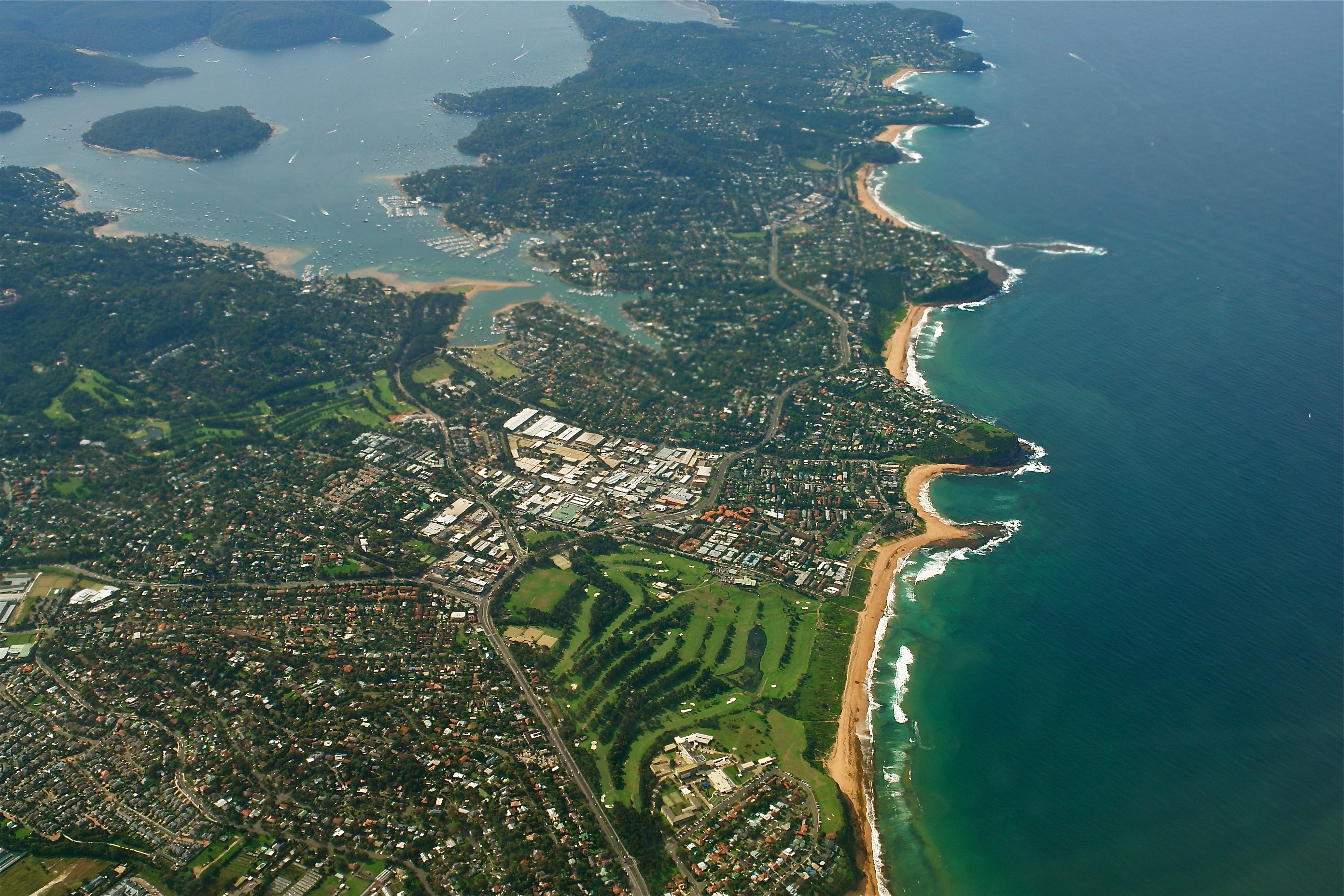
Sydney's Northern Beaches. During recent years, Sydney has experienced some freshwater shortages

Australia is the driest habitable continent on Earth and its installed desalination capacity has been increasing. Until a few decades ago, Australia met its demands for water by drawing freshwater from dams and water catchments. As a result of the water supply crisis during the severe 1997–2009 drought, state governments began building desalination plants that purify seawater using reverse osmosis technology. Approximately one percent of the world's drinkable water originates from desalination plants.

The first modern large-scale desalination plant was the Perth Seawater Desalination Plant, completed in November 2006 and over 30 plants are currently operating across the country. Many plants are utilising nearby wind or wave farms to use renewable energy and reduce operating costs, and solar-powered desalination units are used for remote communities.

== Background ==
Until 100 years ago, Australia met its demands for water by drawing freshwater from dams and water catchments. However, during 2000-2010 a significant lack of rainfall drained water reservoirs. The most affected cities were the capitals, where there is high uncertainty in water supply and demand. In 2007, Sydney, the capital city of New South Wales, experienced a dramatic drop of its main dam Warragamba, where water levels dropped to 33% of normal.

In 1903, Australia's first desalination plant was constructed to treat saline groundwater in the gold fields of Western Australia at Kalgoorlie. Several desalination plants were built in Australia between 1960 and 1980, especially following the revolution in membrane technology that made reverse osmosis economically viable. Vapor-compression desalination and multi-stage flash distillation plants were also built. By 2002, only two reverse osmosis desalination plants were still operating, one on Kangaroo Island and the other on Rottnest Island. Seawater reverse osmosis is the only type of desalination technology used for large-scale desalination plants in Australia, the most important of these plants being located in Perth and Sydney.

== Methods ==
Compared to existing sources, desalination is considered to be expensive, but research is underway to develop more effective desalination technology. Despite its drawbacks, it is considered a possible solution to the country's water shortages.

Australia is the driest inhabitable continent on earth, and its installed desalination capacity is around 1% of the total world's desalination capacity. The Department of Agriculture, Fisheries and Forestry has considered several desalination technologies processes in Australia:

- Reverse osmosis
- Electrodialysis
- Multi-stage flash distillation
- Multiple-effect distillation
- Vapor-compression desalination
- Solar humidification
- Membrane Distillation

=== ROSI ===
A solar powered desalination unit designed for remote communities has been tested in the Northern Territory. The reverse osmosis solar installation (ROSI) uses membrane filtration to provide a reliable and clean drinking water stream from sources such as brackish groundwater. Solar energy overcomes the usually high-energy operating costs as well as greenhouse emissions of conventional reverse osmosis systems. A photovoltaic solar array tracks the Sun and powers the pumps needed to process the water, using the plentiful sunlight available in remote regions of Australia not served by the power grid.

== Desalination plants ==
In Australia many desalination plants utilise wind farms to produce enough energy to operate nearby desalination plants. For example, the Kurnell Desalination Plant, with a capacity of producing 250 million litres (ML) of drinking water per day, supplies 15% of Sydney's water needs via RO technology and is powered using "100 percent renewable energy" from the 140 MW Capital Wind Farm.

The Garden Island plant, planned for commissioning in 2014, will be powered by wave energy, using Carnegie Wave Energy's CETO system. This system uses submerged buoys to pressurise water offshore, which is piped onshore to either drive turbines for electricity generation or, as in this case, to directly desalinate seawater. The Garden Island project is a commercial scale demonstration project, which follows a pilot project off the coast of Fremantle, Western Australia.

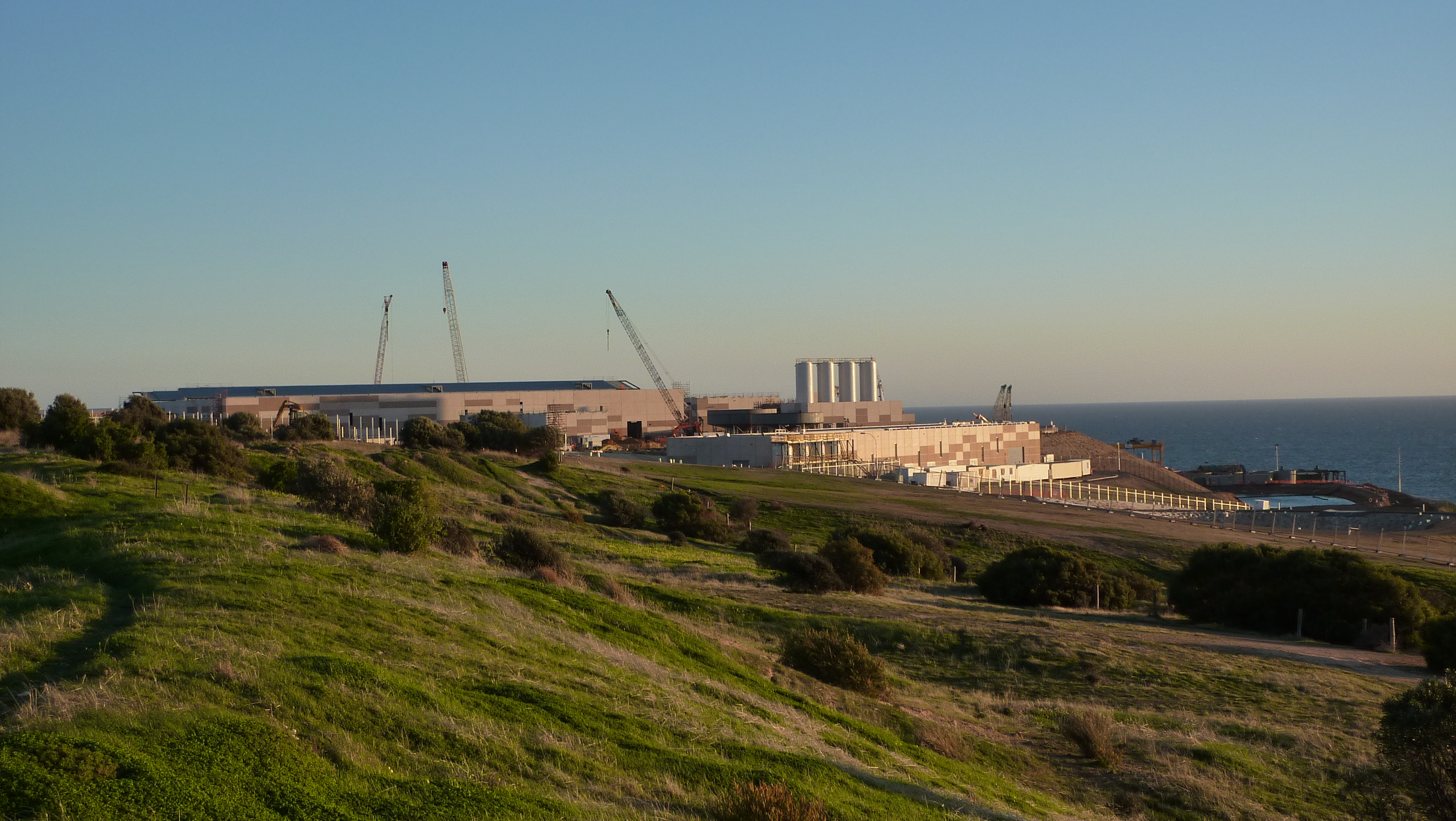
Construction of Adelaide Desalination Plant

The availability of renewable resources and their fluctuation in electricity production from region to region requires a customised design for each desalination facility. In order to maintain steady-state operations, many facilities utilise renewable energy while connected to a smart grid, importing or exporting energy to the plant as required. The Perth Seawater Desalination Plant utilises this strategy, where 48 wind turbines produce 80MW on the Emu Downs Wind Farm to provide 24MW to the desalination plant.

Electrical energy from the renewable energy can be stored in storage batteries and utilised when needed. As seen in the PV-powered RO system in Gillen Bore, Australia, producing 1,200 L/d. If the plant is not required full-time, it can operate using the power as it becomes available. In 2005, a PV-powered hybrid UF/RO filtration system providing 764 litres per day, tolerated well power variation from changing weather conditions.

=== Adelaide ===
In December 2007, the South Australian government announced it would build the Adelaide Desalination Plant seawater desalination plant for the city of Adelaide, Australia, located at Port Stanvac. The desalination plant was to be funded by raising water rates to achieve full cost recovery.

=== Perth ===
About two million people live in the Perth region in the south-western corner of Western Australia. In late 2006, the Perth Seawater Desalination Plant (PSDP) was installed to produce up to 45 gigalitres of potable water per year. Its brine discharge has been shown to have no adverse impact on the environment.

The plant buys its power from electricity generated by the Emu Downs Wind Farm, located 200 kilometres north of Perth. The 83 megawatt wind farm has 48 wind turbines and contributes over 272 giga-watt-hours (GWhr) per year into the grid, fully offsetting the Perth SWRO Plant's estimated electrical requirement of 180 GWhr per year. The plant has attracted interest from the world's water industry and media, and has won numerous national and international awards including the International Desalination Association's International Desalination Plant of the Year in 2007.

Another seawater desalination plant on the coast about 160 kilometres south of Perth is now operational. This plant is designed to have an initial annual output of 50 gigalitres which doubled to 100 gigalitres when the project was completed in 2012.
