= Water restrictions in Australia =

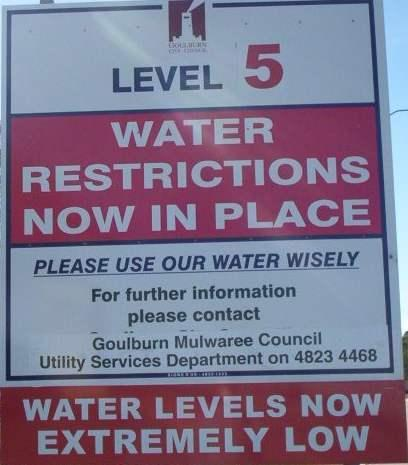
Level 5 water restrictions in Goulburn in 2006.

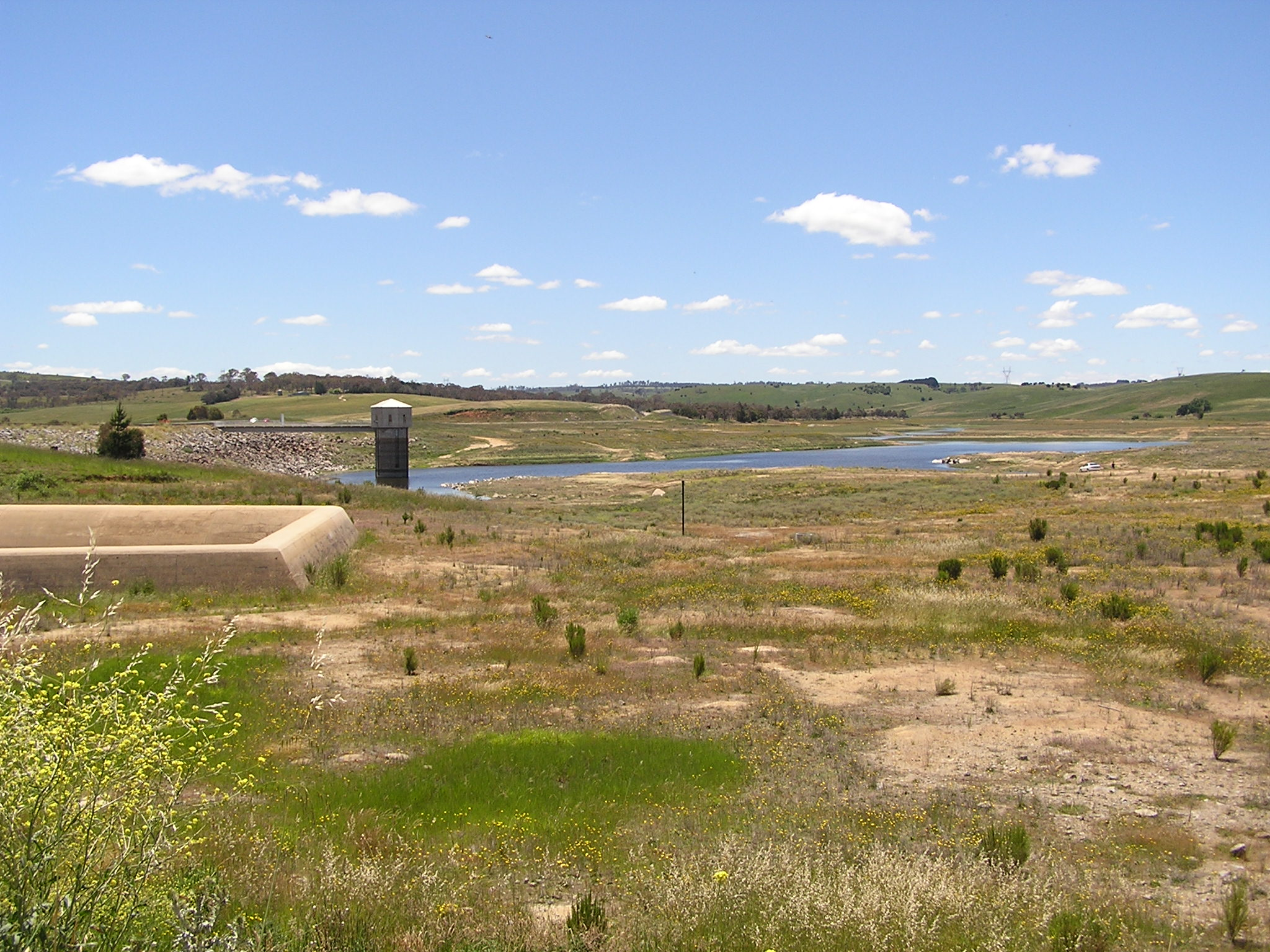
Pejar dam, the water supply for Goulburn in November 2005

Water restrictions have been enacted in many specific cities and regions in Australia, which is the Earth's driest inhabited continent, in response to chronic water shortages resulting from the widespread drought. Depending upon the location, these can include restrictions on watering lawns, using sprinkler systems, washing vehicles, hosing pavement, refilling swimming pools, etc. Overpopulation, evidence of drying climates, coupled with corresponding reductions in the supply of drinking water has led various state governments to consider alternative water sources to supplement existing sources, and to implement "water inspectors" who can issue penalties to those who waste water. Many states describe the different levels of water restrictions in terms of "stages": starting at Stage 1, for the least restrictive, going up as far as Stage 8. The highest level reached in the current drought has been stage 7 for Kingaroy. There are different definitions given to each "stage" in different states.

== Water restrictions by state or territory ==
Australia's national water consumption increased by 11.5% in 2023–24, reflecting higher irrigation demand and drier conditions. All mainland states have invested in large desalination plants to supplement rainfall-dependent water supplies. Melbourne's water storages experienced some of the lowest rainfall and inflows on record during 2024–25, similar to the worst years of the Millennium Drought, with inflows 36% below the 30-year average from July 2024 to June 2025. Permanent Water Saving Rules have applied across Victoria since 2011. The Bureau of Meteorology maintains a national Water Restrictions website providing current restriction information for the whole of Australia, searchable by state, territory and water agency.

=== Australian Capital Territory ===
There are presently four stages of temporary water restrictions which can be imposed by ACTEW Corporation:

	Stage 1	Stage 2	Stage 3	Stage 4
Sprinklers and irrigation:	Any day, after 6pm & before 9am	Drippers only, 7–10am & 7–10pm	No reticulation	
Hand-watering gardens and lawns:	No restrictions	Alternate days, 7–10am & 7–10pm	No watering lawns; watering plants alternate days, 7–10am & 7–10pm	Greywater only
Swimming pools:	No emptying or filling; Topping-up allowed		No topping-up, emptying or filling	
Car washing:	Once a week, or at commercial car wash	Once a month, or at commercial car wash	Only at commercial car washes	No car washing
Window cleaning:	Only with bucket or high-pressure, low-volume cleaner	No window cleaning		

Canberra was subject to Stage 1 restrictions from 1 November 2005, which were increased to Stage 2 after a year on 1 November 2006. The continuing drought led to a further increase to Stage 3 from 16 December 2006; the restrictions were maintained at Stage 3 throughout 2007 and 2008. From 1 November 2010 Canberra moved to Permanent Water Saving Rules due to heavy rain bringing water storages close to capacity.

=== New South Wales ===
The different classification levels of water restrictions in New South Wales vary widely, and are set by the different authorities responsible for water throughout the state.

==== Sydney ====
The following levels have been used by Sydney Water to describe the different stages of water restrictions it has imposed. Level 3 Water Restriction Information is current as of 2009. Level 1 and Level 2 Water Restriction Information is current as of November 2019.

	Level 1 (Current)	Level 2 (Not Current – 10 December 2019 – 29 February 2020)	Level 3
Sprinklers and irrigation:	No standard sprinklers at any time; Drip irrigation can be used; Watering systems can be used with soil moisture sensor, rain sensor, or automated weather adjustment only	No standard sprinklers, soaker/weeping hoses, mist sprayers, tap timers, or watering systems at any time; Sprinklers are not permitted to be used for children to play under; Before 10am and after 4pm every day: Drip irrigation systems for a maximum of 15 minutes a day; Systems with a soil moisture/rain sensor, or automated weather adjustment for a maximum of 15 minutes per day	No sprinklers at any time
Watering gardens and lawns:	Hose with trigger nozzle can be used before 10 am and after 4 pm every day; Watering cans and buckets permitted; New turf can be watered for one week as per turf instructions; Hoses cannot be left running unattended	Gardens & lawns can be watered before 10 am & after 4 pm using only a watering can or bucket (for any amount of time); Hoses cannot be used for garden or lawn watering; New turf can be watered with a hand-held trigger nozzle hose for up to four weeks, only following the Sydney Water plan found here; New turf greater than 30 m^{2} (continuous) can use sprinklers and watering systems in place of a hose, only following the Sydney Water plan found here	2 times weekly, before 10 am or after 4 pm (as of 2009)
Vehicles, Boats, and Buildings:	Washing vehicles and/or buildings permitted only with a hose connected to a trigger nozzle; High-pressure cleaning equipment permitted; Washing of bins with trigger nozzle or high-pressure equipment permitted	Vehicles: Vehicles, trailered vessels, & trailers are only permitted to be cleaned with a bucket & sponge, or at a commercial car wash; Hoses are not permitted to wash vehicles; Boats: Boats can be washed for 10 minutes using trigger nozzle hose after being in seawater; Boat motors can be flushed with a bucket or a purpose-designed flushing device; Boat water tanks can be filled using an attended hose – tank is not to overflow; Bilges can be cleaned using a high-pressure cleaner or trigger nozzle hose; Safety components of boat trailers can be cleaned (eg. wheel bearings or brakes) using a high-pressure cleaner or trigger hose; Buildings Residents and businesses: Washing of garbage bins is permitted using water from a bucket or a trigger nozzle hose; A bucket and cloth/sponge is permitted for washing of windows or other glass surfaces.; Alternatively, professional window cleaners who have an exemption permit can be used; No cleaning of walls, roofing, gutters or hard surfaces with a hose or high pressure cleaner as part of general cleaning; No use of water for dust suppression without a permit, unless there's no alternative water source reasonably available; Leaving hoses and taps running unattended is not permitted	No current information
Swimming pools:	Permitted to top up swimming pool or spa; Permit and pool cover required to fill new or renovated pool	Permitted to top up an existing pool or spa, using a trigger nozzle hose, watering can or bucket for a maximum of 15 minutes a day.; (Only to top up to replace water lost through evaporation, not to replace water deliberately removed from the pool or spa); No filling of pools over 500L without a permit; No use of children's toys that connect to a hose, such as a 'slip n' slide'; Only recycled/grey/rain/bore water can be used to fill/top up your pond or water feature. Drinking water is not permitted to be used.	No current information
Hard surfaces:	No hosing hard surfaces (paths, driveways, and buildings) as part of general cleaning; Spot cleaning of hard surfaces permitted only for health, safety, or emergency reasons only	Not permitted to clean hard surfaces such as paths, driveways and paved areas with a hose/high pressure cleaner as part of general cleaning; A broom is to be used to clean paths, driveways and other hard surfaces; Spot cleaning hard surfaces for health, safety or emergency reasons, using a trigger nozzle hose or high pressure cleaner is permitted	No hosing hard surfaces (paths, driveways, cars, floors and buildings)
Exemptions _{(These are not subject to water restrictions, but must be used wisely)}		Using drinking water for firefighting, testing and related activities is not restricted.; Recycled water (some areas of Sydney from purple pipes); Grey-water (from sinks, showers, washing machines etc); Rainwater (not topped up from, or switched to, the drinking water supply); Bore water (some government restrictions apply); River water (you need to have a licence); Water required to sustain life or structural integrity in a pond, lake, or water feature must have an exemption permit.	No current information

Sydney Water Restrictions (2019–present)

Level 1 Restrictions:

In late May 2019, it was announced that Sydney Water will be reinstating Level 1 water restrictions throughout the greater Sydney area. These restrictions began on 1 June 2019, as a result of an extremely dry year. As of 29 May 2019, Greater Sydney water supply levels are 53.4%, which is significantly lower than May 2018, in which supply levels were 73% in major catchments.

Level 2 Restrictions:

On 21 November 2019, the NSW government announced Level 2 water restrictions. These restrictions commenced on 10 December 2019, replacing the level 1 water restrictions. Level 2 restrictions have been brought in earlier than the Metropolitan Water Plan (2017) recommends, with dam levels currently at 46.1%. Premier Gladys Berejiklian, and Minister for Water, Property and Housing, Melinda Pavey announced the restrictions early as a precautionary measure, and to stave off the implementation of Level 3 restrictions later on.

Level 3 Restrictions:

Upon the commencement of the Level 2 water restrictions in December 2019, Minister for Water, Property and Housing, Melinda Pavey announced that Level 3 water restrictions should be expected early in the year of 2020.

Sydney Water Restrictions (2003–2009)

Falling dam levels prompted Sydney Water to impose Level 1 water restrictions on the Sydney area from 1 October 2003. When these restrictions failed to stem the reduction in the city's water supplies as a result of continuing drought, and with dam levels dropping below 50 per cent, Level 2 water restrictions were introduced from 1 June 2004. Further reductions in dam levels to below 40 per cent of capacity led to an increase to Level 3 water restrictions from 1 June 2005. Level 3 water restrictions were in place as of February 2008. Since June 2009, though, Sydney Water replaced water restrictions with Water Wise Rules. The Rules include:

- All hoses must now have a trigger nozzle.
- Hand held hoses, sprinklers and watering systems may be used only before 10 am and after 4 pm on any day – to avoid the heat of the day.
- No hosing of hard surfaces such as paths and driveways. Washing vehicles is allowed.
- Fire hoses may be used for fire fighting activities only.

To deal with its water shortage, New South Wales has followed the same path as Western Australia, in which a desalination plant for Sydney was built at an estimated cost of $1.3 billion. The Sydney Desalination Plant is to be turned on when Sydney's drinking water level reaches 60% capacity, and water restrictions will be in place when drinking water reaches 50% capacity.

Sydney Water has imposed fines of $220 for violations of the rules for individuals, $550 for businesses, and $2,200 for water theft. Rules are enforced by Sydney Water staff through random checks.

==== Regional NSW ====
As different towns in regional New South Wales take their drinking water from different sources, different levels of water restrictions apply. The levels or stages which apply in certain towns are as follows:

- Albury – no restrictions
- Armidale – Level 5 from October 2019
- Bathurst – Level 3 from 26 November 2019
- Cobar – Stage 5
- Dubbo – From Saturday 1 June 2019 Level 2 Water Restrictions are in place.
- Gosford – Stage 4 from 1 October 2006
- Goulburn had Stage 5 water restrictions imposed from 1 October 2004, and went on to win a National Water Conservation Award for Excellence due to the water which had been conserved. From 5 July 2007, Goulburn relaxed its water restrictions to Level 3.
- Griffith – Stage 2 introduced on 27 November 2007
- Leeton – Level 3 introduced on 9 October 2007 but lowered to level 2 on 1 November 2008
- Newcastle – Level 1 from 16 September 2019
- Orange – Level 5 from 6 October 2019
- Port Macquarie – Stage 2 from September 2019
- Taree – Level 3 from 11 November 2019
- Wagga Wagga – Permanent Water Conservation Measure

=== Northern Territory ===
The Territory's water resources are managed and protected by the Northern Territory (NT) Water Act 1992.

In 2017, the Northern Territory Government introduced Compulsory Water Conservation Measures to the Katherine region to take pressure off of their groundwater supplies. This meant:

- Odd numbered properties can only water from 6pm-8am on Mondays, Wednesdays, and Saturdays.
- Even numbered properties can only water from 6pm-8am on Tuesdays, Thursdays, and Sundays.
- No watering on Friday.
- No watering on hard surfaces such as pavements, driveways, or road surfaces.

Currently, Northern Territory does not have any restrictions for most of their reigons.

=== Queensland ===
Some of the details of the different stages of water restrictions which apply in Queensland for the residential sector are as follows:

	Stage 1	Stage 2	Stage 3	Stage 4	Stage 5	Stage 6	Stage 7
Reticulation sprinklers:	3 days/week	No sprinklers					No external water use without permit
Sprinkler times:	4–8am & 4–8pm	No sprinklers					No external water use without permit
Hose watering of gardens:	3 days/week		No hosing				No external water use without permit
Hose watering times:	4–8am & 4–8pm	Before 7 am & after 7 pm	No hosing				No external water use without permit
Bucket/watering can watering times:	Any time			3 days/week; 4–8am & 4–8pm	No watering lawns; Otherwise 3 days/week, 4–7pm		No external water use without permit
Pool filling:	Any time			Requires approval			No external water use without permit
Topping-up pools:	4–8am & 4–8pm, 3 days/week	7pm–7am, 3 days/week		4–8am & 4–8pm, 3 days/week	4–7pm, 3 days/week	Log required	No external water use without permit
Hosing hard surfaces:	Prohibited at all times						No external water use without permit
Car/window washing:	Hose or bucket		Bucket only		Bucket only, to wash mirrors, lights & windows		No external water use without permit

Although some regions of Queensland have had traditionally high rainfalls, some regions of Queensland have been subject to the toughest water restrictions in place in Australia. The highest level of water restrictions reached the drought was stage 7 for Kingaroy. Toowoomba, Brisbane and South East Queensland reached Level 6 restrictions.

On 13 May 2005, 13 local councils in southeast Queensland, including those in Brisbane, agreed to impose Stage 1 water restrictions, due to drying dams. These restrictions were increased to Stage 2 from 3 October 2005, which at the time were described as the "toughest water restrictions in southeast Queensland's history", except the Gold Coast which had been on Stage 5 restrictions since 2004. Stage 3 water restrictions were imposed on the region from 13 June 2006 amid projections that water storage levels would drop to 5% within 26 months. Water restrictions continued to increase, to Stage 4 from 1 November 2006, stage 5 from 10 April 2007, and up to Stage 6 from 23 November 2007.

The Queensland Water Commission has relaxed water restrictions, with the introduction of High Level Water restrictions as of 31 July 2008.

Other towns and regions of Queensland are subject to different levels of water restrictions, as set out below:

- Cairns – Level 1 restrictions from October 2002 till about January 2004.
- Gold Coast – Stage 6 from 23 November 2007, Stage 5 from 10 April 2007, Stage 4 from 1 November 2006. The Hinze Dam, which is the Gold Coast's main water supply reached 100% in January 2008 and the coast now has no water restrictions.
- Kingaroy – Stage 7 from 1 October 2007
- Toowoomba – Stage 6 from 23 November 2007, Stage 5 from 26 September 2006. In 2006, the town council proposed the use of recycled wastewater to supplement town water from dams, however the scheme was rejected by the town's population and the town has since resorted to drilling artesian and sub-artesian bores as an alternative source of drinking water.
- Townsville – Stage 2 from 15 November 2006, Stage 1 from 12 February 2007. As of 2020 only minor conservation measures are in place and a major pipeline from the Haughton River (Burdekin Dam) is well under construction providing long term water security to the city, council have stated water restrictions will be abolished once implemented.

Source: Queensland Water Restrictions, Queensland Water Commission

=== South Australia ===
The different levels of residential water restrictions which have been applied to different regions of South Australia by SA Water are as follows:

	Permanent Water Conservation Measures	Eyre Peninsula	Level 2	Level 3
Reticulation sprinklers:	5pm–10am (6pm–10am in DST)	6pm–8am (8pm–8am in DST)	8pm–8am, 3 days/week. Sporting grounds and public facilities 2 days/week.	Prohibited
Hand-held hose watering and drippers:	Any time			1 day/week with trigger nozzle, 6–9am or 5–8pm
Bucket/watering cans:	Any time			
Swimming pools and Spas:	No restrictions	No filling or emptying without permit. New pools or spas must have a cover.		
Fountains and ponds:	No restrictions	Must not be operated and can not be topped up unless they support fish.		
Car washing:	Bucket, commercial car wash or hose with trigger nozzle only		Bucket or commercial car wash only	
Hard surfaces:	No washing or hosing down hard surfaces			

Different water restrictions levels apply to different parts of the state, depending upon the source of drinking water used in that region. SA Water have produced a map showing the current areas of water restrictions.

==== Areas using Murray River water ====
Adelaide and much of south-eastern South Australia takes its drinking water from the Murray River. Permanent water conservation measures were put into place in this region in 2003, and as a result of the most severe drought to hit the region since the 1940s, Level 2 water restrictions were imposed from 22 October 2006 on those areas (including metropolitan Adelaide) which use water from the Murray River. Even lower inflows to the Murray River over the course of 2006 led to the even tougher Level 3 water restrictions being imposed on the region from 1 January 2007, which remain in place.

==== Other areas ====
The Eyre Peninsula draws most of its drinking water from underground basins, which progressively became depleted through drought and high consumption, prompting the State Government to introduce water restrictions on the entire region from 6 December 2002, apart from Whyalla. The water restrictions for the peninsula remain in force as of 2008.

Conversely, the areas in the south east of the State, south of the town of Keith, are subject to the permanent water conservation measures.

Other areas in the state are not subject to water restrictions. These areas include Murray Mallee, areas north of Port Augusta, Kangaroo Island, Cockburn, Hawker, Melrose, Ororoo, Parachilna, Quorn, Warooka, Wilmington, Terowie, Yunta, Olary and Manna Hill.

The different levels of residential water restrictions which have been applied to different regions of South Australia by SA Water are as follows:

Permanent Water Conservation Measures Eyre Peninsula Level 2 Level 3 Reticulation sprinklers: 5pm–10am (6pm–10am in DST) 6pm–8am (8pm–8am in DST) 8pm–8am, 3 days/week Prohibited Hand-held hose watering and drippers: Any time 1 day/week with trigger nozzle, 6–9am or 5–8pm.

=== Tasmania ===
Usually, there are only water restrictions for domestic consumption in remote areas which experience high levels of tourism, and therefore increased usage, in summer months.

Periodically, however, restrictions will be placed on how water can be used in domestic, commercial or rural areas. Examples of such restrictions are:

- watering with a hose is permitted but not using a fixed sprinkler system,
- being able to use sprinkler systems only during certain hours,
- washing a car is permitted using a bucket of water but not using the hose,
- watering of sports grounds allowed only during certain hours,
- watering stock is acceptable but not irrigating.

One purpose of such restrictions is to keep the multiple smaller river fed water storage levels high enough to ensure adequate water pressure for the fire department's needs in the event of fires.

=== Victoria ===
The different stages of water restrictions which apply in different areas of Victoria are based on the Victorian Uniform Drought Water Restriction Guidelines, which, however, have been modified by the inclusion of a Stage 3a, to reduce the likelihood of needing to impose Stage 4 restrictions in metropolitan Melbourne.

	Stage 1	Stage 2	Stage 3	Stage 3a	Stage 4
Watering lawns:	Manual: Any time, any day with the use of a trigger-nozzle hose or bucket. Automatic: 6am–10am and 6pm–10pm on alternating days	Watering lawns is banned			All outside watering banned
Reticulation watering days:	Alternating days		Drippers only, 2 days/week		All outside watering banned
Automatic reticulation:	Midnight–4am			Midnight–2am	All outside watering banned
Manual reticulation:	6–8am & 8–10pm			6–8am	All outside watering banned
Hose watering/ buckets/ watering cans:	Any time		2 days/week, 6–8am & 8–10pm	2 days/week, 6–8am	All outside watering banned
Hosing hard surfaces:	Banned at all times				
Car washing:	Bucket/high pressure cleaner or trigger nozzle hose	Bucket/high pressure cleaner only	Buckets only to clean windows, mirrors and lights		
Swimming pools:	Filling or topping up pools/spas up to 2000 L permitted. Over 2000 L, permit required	No filling			

The status of water restrictions in different regions of Victoria is as set out below:

- Bairnsdale – Now off water restrictions and on permanent water saving rules as of 24 August 2007
- Ballarat – Stage 3 from 1 January 2010, Stage 1 from 1 August 2010.
- Bendigo area – Stage 3 from 1 January 2009
- Broadford – Stage 4 from 1 February 2007
- Geelong – Stage 3 from March 2010, Stage 1 from 3 October 2010
- Central Gippsland – All towns on Permanent Water Saving Rules
- Coongulla & Glenmaggie – Stage 4 from 24 February 2007
- Horsham – Stage 1 from 14 October 2009
- Mansfield area – Stage 4 for Mansfield from 16 December 2006, other areas nearby on Stage 1 and 2
- Melbourne – Stage 1 from 28 August 2006, Stage 2 from 1 November 2006, Stage 3 from 1 January 2007, Stage 3a from 1 April 2007, Stage 3 from 2 April 2010, Stage 2 from 1 September 2010. As of 1 December 2012, Melbourne was taken off water restriction stages, but new permanent water restrictions were implemented.
- Mildura – now off water restrictions and on permanent water saving rules as of 3 October 2010
- Omeo – Stage 2 from 11 December 2006
- North east region – Bright reverted to Stage 2 and Springhurst reverted to Stage 1 on 10 September 2007. Most of the Murray towns went to Stage 4 on 1 July 2007 (e.g. Wodonga, Yarrawonga, Rutherglen etc.), and on 11 July 2007 Devenish, St James and Tungamah went to stage 3. As of 2010, most towns/cities in the North East have moved to Permanent Water Saving Rules thanks to flooding rain over winter and spring.

Source: Report and map explaining the restrictions in Victoria as of September 2006 and Water restrictions as of 2010

=== Western Australia ===
The different stages of water restrictions which can currently be applied in Western Australia are as follows:

	Stage 1	Stage 2	Stage 3	Stage 4	Stage 5	Stage 6	Stage 7
Reticulation sprinklers:	Daily	Alternate days	3 times/week	Twice weekly	Once weekly	No sprinklers	
Sprinkler times:	Before 9.00 am or after 6.00 pm					No sprinklers	
Hose watering of gardens:	Any time						No hose watering
Swimming pools:	No restriction	No over-filling			No topping-up		No filling
Car washing:	No restriction						Bucket only

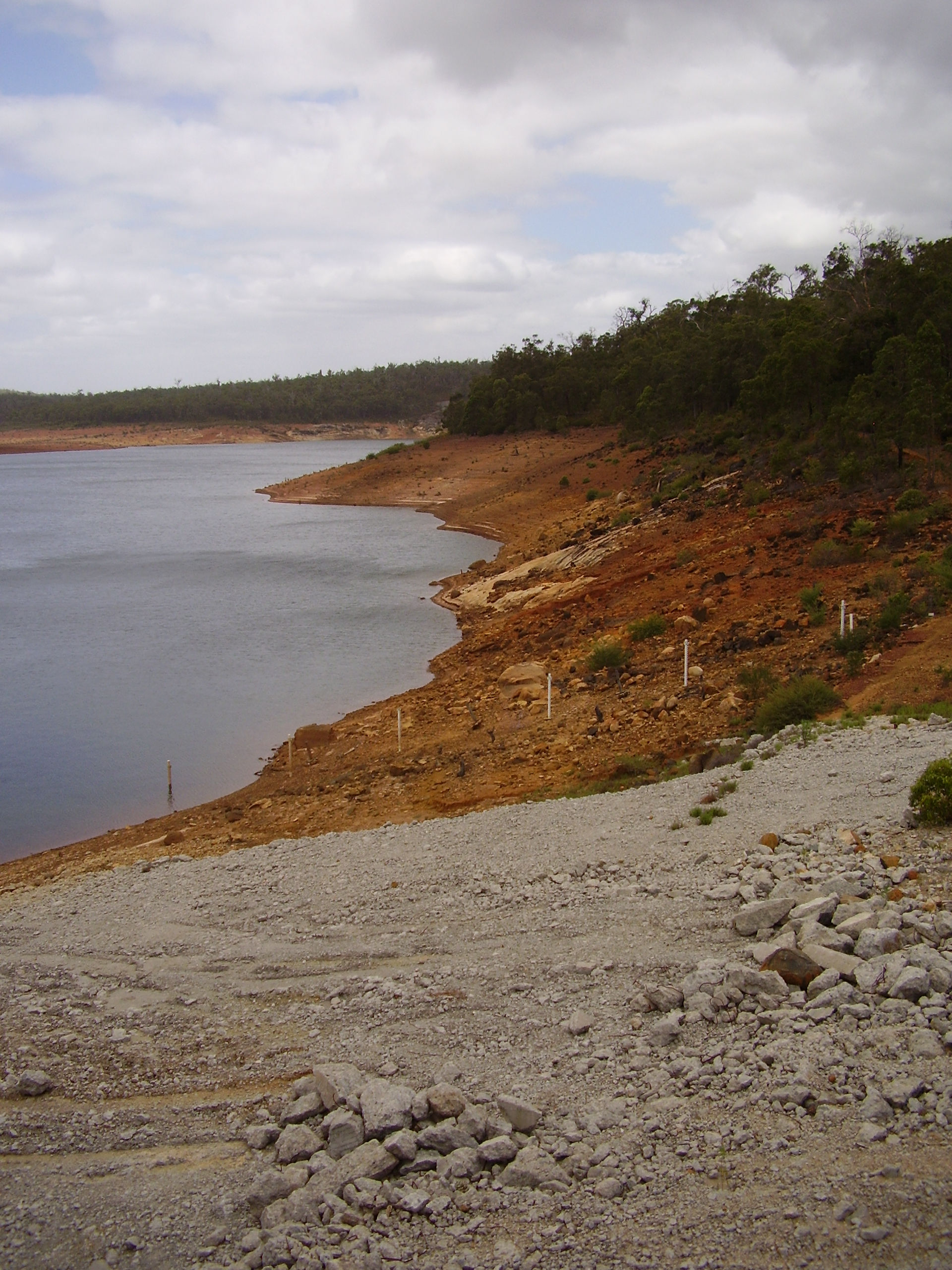
Canning Dam, one of Perth's major dams, at 34.4% of capacity

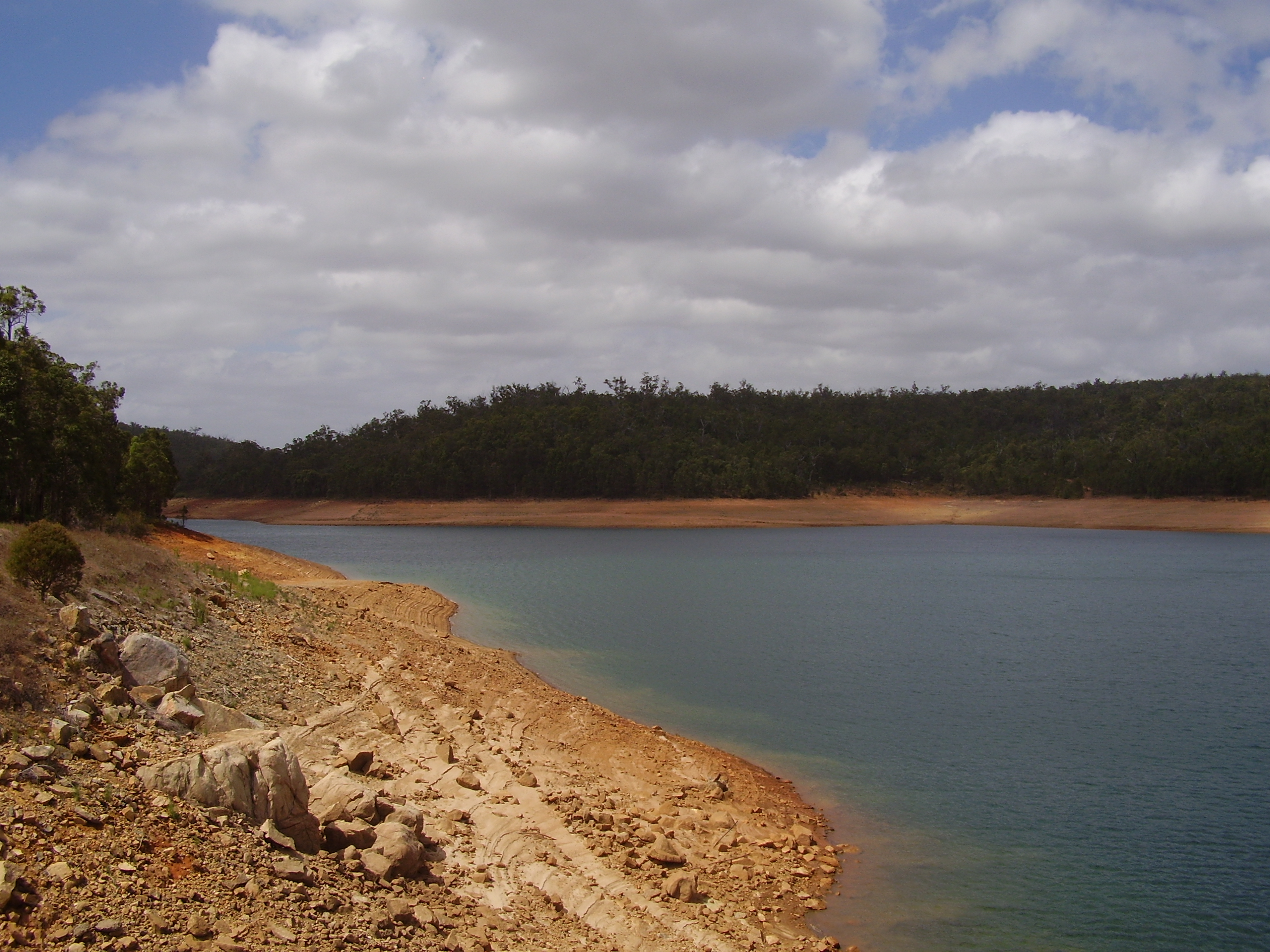
Victoria Dam, at 30.6% of capacity

Water restrictions have been employed in various Western Australian towns when poor rainfall has led to water shortages. For instance, in the summer of 1977–1978, Perth was subject to a total sprinkler ban. Newman and Nullagine experienced water restrictions from 1991 and 1992 onwards as the result of drought. Similarly, the resort towns of Yallingup and Dunsborough experienced water restrictions in 1997 during a heatwave, and Kalgoorlie-Boulder had temporary water restrictions imposed during 1998 due to shortages in its reservoirs (which contain water pumped through the Goldfields Water Supply Scheme).

A Stage 1 ban on using reticulation sprinklers between 9.00 am and 6.00 pm was imposed on Perth residents in 1996, and remains in place to this day. This was the first water restriction imposed on the state's most populous city since the total sprinkler ban in 1978. From September 2001, users of the Integrated Water Supply Scheme (covering Perth, its surrounds and towns on the Goldfields pipeline) were subject to Stage 4 restrictions, only permitted to use reticulation sprinklers two days per week, according to a roster.

The town of Northampton in the Mid-West encountered a water shortage in 2006 where its underground aquifer could not meet demand. Stage 5 watering restrictions were imposed, and the Water Corporation resorted to carting tankers of water to the town to maintain the supply.

Stage 4 water restrictions were imposed in the South-West towns of Bridgetown, Balingup, Boyup Brook, Hester, Kirup, Greenbushes and Mullalyup from 13 October 2006.

On 1 October 2007, water restrictions were expanded to cover the entire state, including those towns serviced by utilities other than the Water Corporation. Under the new system, all areas of the state in the region south of Kalbarri and Kalgoorlie (including Perth and most of the state's population) which use scheme water are subject to Stage 4 restrictions. Areas north of the dividing line are subject to Stage 2 restrictions. Furthermore, whereas the water restrictions had previously only restricted the use of mains water to water gardens and lawns by sprinkler, under the new water restrictions unlicensed bore operators in Perth and its surrounds are restricted to watering their gardens three times per week. This was to slow the depletion of underground aquifers from which Perth sources much of its drinking water.

Around November 2013 the water restrictions were removed from the Water Agencies (Water Use) Bylaws 2010 and added to the Water Services Regulations 2013

Efforts are being made to secure alternative water sources to ease water shortages in the Integrated Water Supply System. Integral to the Government's strategy is the construction of desalination plants to service Perth. One has already been constructed in Kwinana, which supplies 17% of the city's water consumption and is the largest desalination plant in both the Southern Hemisphere and Eastern Hemisphere. A second desalination plant near Binningup was completed in 2011. A trial has also been announced to treat wastewater and pump it into underground aquifers to undergo natural filtration as it returns to the dwindling groundwater supply.

== Water storage levels ==
The Australian Bureau of Meteorology collates national statistics (from 2009 onwards) for water storage levels and makes them available on their water storage web tool and via a water storage iPhone app.

Sources: Water Services Association of Australia, Melbourne Water (listed as percent)

Location	Dec 2005	Sep 2006	Oct 2006	Nov 2006	Dec 2006	Jan 2007	Feb 2007	Mar 2007	Apr 2007	May 2007	Jun 2007	Jul 2007	Aug 2007	Sep 2007	Oct 2007	Nov 2007	Dec 2007	Jan 2008	Feb 2008	Mar 2008
Adelaide	89	57.5	58	57	55.9	56.5	55													
Brisbane	35	26.9	25.9	24.87	24.3	22.7	21.7				15.5				20.5					
Canberra	67	47.8	45.9	42.56	40.4	36.7	34.7	31.4							41.7					
Darwin	56	85		77		79														
Hobart		81	81		87	85	79													
Melbourne	58.1	46	44.1	46	39.8	38.7	36.5	32.1	33.1	35.6	39.1	43.6	42.7	42.3	40.1	37.1				
Perth	39	32.3	31.8	29.53	28.7	26	23.6													
Sydney	40.5	42.6	40.6	38.6	37.1	34.8	37.1	38.5	38.2	37.3	53.1	57.5	58.8	58.9	57.3	58.8	60.9	61.0	66.4	66.1

== Criticism ==
Water restrictions have been criticised for hampering the economy and the lifestyles of people. The National Water Commission chief has argued that Australia needs a source of water that is independent of rainfall. Water desalination is touted as the solution for potentially unlimited water use. Former Australian Environment Minister, Malcolm Turnbull says that it does not make sense to have permanent water restrictions just as there are no electricity restrictions.

== See also ==
- Climate change in Australia
- Drought in Australia
- Peak water
- Water data transfer format
- Water supply and sanitation in Australia
