= Water pyramid =

A Water pyramid or WaterPyramid is a village-scale solar still, designed to distill water using solar energy for remote communities without easy access to clean, fresh water. It provides a means whereby communities can produce potable drinking water from saline, brackish or polluted water sources.

== History ==
Martijn Nitzsche, an engineer from the Netherlands, founded Aqua-Aero Water Systems to develop water treatment and purification systems. In the early 2000s, the company invented the WaterPyramid technology. The first WaterPyramid was engineered and installed in collaboration with MWH Global, an international environmental engineering firm, in the country of Gambia in 2005. The WaterPyramid desalination systems were awarded the World Bank Development Marketplace award in 2006.

== Description ==
The pyramid stands about 26 feet (7.9 meters) tall, 100 feet (30 meters) in diameter, and has a conical shape. It is constructed of plastic sheeting, which is inflated using a fan powered by solar energy generated by the pyramid. Within the pyramid, temperatures reach up to 167 °F (75 °C), which evaporates water pumped into thin layer of water inside the cone. Distilled water runs down the sides of the pyramid wall and is collected by gutters that feed into a collection tank. When sunshine is replaced by rain, the falling water is also collected around the edge of the base of the cone and stored for use in dry weather. Each pyramid can desalinate approximately 265 U.S. gallons (1,000 liters) of water each day. To increase water production, a village simply adds additional pyramids.

Operation of each pyramid is the responsibility of the local community, generating employment opportunities for the village. Since the water produced by the Pyramid is distilled water, there are also business uses for excess water production, such as the filling of batteries, which provide additional income to the village.

== See also ==
- Desalination
- Solar-powered desalination unit
- Solar still
- Seawater Greenhouse
