= Sydney Desalination Plant =

Australian potable drinking water facility

- Location within New South Wales
- Interactive map of Sydney Desalination Plant
- Location: Kurnell, Southern Sydney, New South Wales, Australia
- Coordinates: 34.02475°S 151.205136°E
- Estimated output: 250 ML (55×10^{6} imp gal) per day
- Extended output: 500 ML (110×10^{6} imp gal) per day
- Cost: A$1.803 billion
- Energy usage: 257.7 GWh (928 TJ) in the first full year of operation. 38 Megawatts (333 GWh per year) at full production
- Energy generation offset: Capital Wind Farm, Bungendore, 450 GWh (1,600 TJ) per annum
- Technology: Reverse osmosis
- Percent of water supply: 15% of Sydney; 30% extended capacity
- Operation date: 28 January 2010
- Website: sydneydesal.com.au

The Sydney Desalination Plant also known as the Kurnell Desalination Plant is a potable drinking water desalination plant that forms part of the water supply system of Greater Metropolitan Sydney. The plant is located in the Kurnell industrial estate, in Southern Sydney in the Australian state of New South Wales. The plant uses reverse osmosis filtration membranes to remove salt from seawater and is powered using renewable energy, supplied to the national power grid from the Infigen Energy–owned Capital Wind Farm located at Bungendore.

The Sydney Desalination Plant is owned by the Government of New South Wales. In 2012, the NSW Government entered into a 50–year lease with Sydney Desalination Plant Pty Ltd (SDP), a company jointly owned by the Ontario Teachers' Pension Plan Board (50%) and two funds managed by Hastings Funds Management Limited: Utilities Trust of Australia and The Infrastructure Fund (together 50%). The terms of the A$2.3 billion lease lock Sydney Water into a 50–year water supply agreement with SDP. The operator of the plant is Veolia Water Australia Pty Ltd.

The Sydney Desalination Plant is the third major desalination plant built in Australia, after Kwinana in Perth which was completed in 2006 and Tugun on the Gold Coast which was completed in 2009.

== Background ==
Sydney summers during the first decade of the 21st century saw significant declines of dam storage levels. The 2000s Australian drought caused the commission of the Sydney Desalination Plant. Except for 1998, inflows into Warragamba Dam, Sydney's main dam were below average from 1992 until 2006. In the lead up to construction, Sydney's dams hadn't been 100% full since 1998. Between January 2004 and July 2007, Sydney's available water storage dropped below 55%. Water supply levels reached their lowest recorded point on 9–10 February 2007 of 33.8% In November 2009, water storage again dropped below 55%.

The 2004 Metropolitan Water Plan indicated that planning for a desalination plant would be undertaken so that, if the drought continued, it would be possible to construct a desalination plant relatively quickly and efficiently. The feasibility study was undertaken during the first half of 2005 and concluded that desalination is a feasible option for water supply management in Sydney.

=== Decision to build ===
In response to these problems, the NSW Government's 2006 Metropolitan Water Plan identified desalination as a way of securing Sydney's water supply needs in the case of a severe, prolonged drought:

Given its total independence of rainfall, desalination can be used to secure supplies in the event of extreme drought. Following detailed investigations, the NSW Government has identified a preferred technology (reverse osmosis), purchased a site, sought planning approval and undertaken substantial preparatory works so that it can build a desalination plant if required. The probability of dam levels reaching the 30% level is very low, but it is vital to ensure that Sydney's water needs can still be met should this situation occur. In such a situation, a desalination plant would be constructed with a capacity of 125 million litres per day, but this could be increased to 500 million litres per day if required. Having the capacity to draw on desalination means that the Government will not need to impose drought restrictions on water use that are more stringent than those imposed when dams levels reached 40% in June 2005.

— chapter 7 of the 2006 Metropolitan Water Plan (pg 78)

On 16 October 2006 the NSW Minister for Planning Frank Sartor signed the approval for Sydney Water to proceed with the construction of the Kurnell Desalination Plant.

When operating at full capacity, the Sydney desalination plant was designed to supply up to 15% of the drinking water supply for Sydney's 2006 population. It was the largest water supply project for Sydney, Australia's biggest city, since Warragamba Dam was opened in 1960 by the Sydney Metropolitan Water Sewerage and Drainage Board. The desalination project was announced in February 2007, when Sydney dam levels dropped to 33.8% of total storage (just 3.8% higher than the adaptive trigger of "about 30% of dam storage levels" foreshadowed in the 2006 Metropolitan Water Plan), the lowest level reached since the drought that preceded the opening of Warragamba, in the 1940s and 1950s.

=== Construction ===
The desalination plant was built by the Blue Water Joint Venture, under contract to Sydney Water. The Blue Water Joint Venture comprised the plant constructor, John Holland Group, and the operator, Veolia Water Australia Pty Ltd.

The total approved budget of the project was $1.896 billion and it was delivered on time and in excess of an estimated $60 million under this budget at the completion of construction. The final cost of the plant, before it was refinanced by the NSW Government to the private sector, was $1.803 billion. The plant was refinanced with a book value in excess of $2 billion in early 2012, providing a profit to the government at transaction close.

=== Storm damage ===
On 16 December 2015 a very strong weather event, described as a tornado, struck Kurnell with high rainfall, hailstones and unusually strong winds, up to 213 kilometres per hour (132 mph). Large areas of the desalination plants' roof was blown off and the control room windows blown out with "water and wind damage in the control room itself." The plants' chief executive Keith Davies stated that there was "significant" damage to the roof and control room. Repairs were expected to be completed by the end of 2018.

== Infrastructure and capacity ==
The original proposal was to build a plant with a 125ML per day capacity that could be scaled up to 500 ML if necessary. The decision was made before building, that a 250 ML plant would be built instead, although still with the potential to be scaled up to 500 ML.

The desalination plant is connected to the Tasman Sea via intake and outlet tunnels. The plant is connected to the water supply by a pipeline under Botany Bay from Kurnell to Kyeemagh, thence under Kogarah Golf Course, along the northern shore of the Alexandra canal and finally connecting to the Sydney water supply network via City Tunnel near Ashmore street, Erskineville.

At Erskineville, the drinking water delivered via the pipeline from Kurnell is delivered into the City Tunnel connecting Potts Hill Reservoir, in western Sydney, to the Waterloo Pumping Station, in eastern Sydney. Off-take pipes along the length of the City Tunnel mean that, depending on demand, desalinated water will be fed into the drinking water supply throughout much of metropolitan Sydney. In the process, the desalination plant-supplied water will ease the drawdown on water from the city's surface storages such as Warragamba Dam.

Sydney residents south of Sydney Harbour and as far west as Bankstown are the direct consumers of the desalinated water.

Both the tunnels to the sea and the pipeline to the water supply have been built to the capacity of 500 ML per day, so if the plant is ever expanded, the supporting infrastructure is already in place.

== Operation ==
The plant operated continuously between 2010 and 2012.

On 9 December 2011 the dam storage level reached 80%. The NSW Minister for Finance and Services Greg Pearce directed the Sydney Desalination Plant to reduce supply to about 90 million litres a day. The plant's performance and increased dam levels mean the original two-year proving period of running the plant at full capacity (250 million litres/day) can end early. When the dam storage level reached 90% capacity, the Minister directed the Sydney Desalination Plant to cease production on 2 July 2012.

Production will recommence when dam storage levels reach 60% and will remain in production until dam storage levels reach 70%.

The desalination plant was turned on on 27 January 2019, and has been given eight months to restart, requiring hiring 20 people and disinfecting the pipes. Sydney residents' water bills are expected to rise by $25-$30 as a result. The plant must now operate for at least 14 months, due to contractual reasons, potentially until dam levels reach 70%.

On 10 August 2019 it was announced that, two months ahead of schedule, the plant had reached the full production of 250 million litres per day, 15 per cent of Sydney's supply.

=== Expansion ===
On 9 January 2020, the NSW Government announced plans to double the size of the plant to produce 500 ML per day. This plan was announced after dam levels in 2019 fell rapidly to 43.1%. High levels of rainfall since that announcement has resulted in the plans being placed on hold.

== Energy generation offset ==
Part of the Sydney Desalination Plan's cost was the construction of a wind farm to offset the energy usage of the plant with 100% renewable energy. The 67–turbine Capital Wind Farm at Bungendore was built for this purpose and produces approximately 340 gigawatt-hours (1,200 TJ) per year. The generating/nameplate capacity is 140 megawatts (190,000 hp).

The wind farm has been designed to produce more than enough energy to operate the desalination plant to cover the days when there is less wind. It will increase the supply of wind energy in NSW by over 700%. It is a massive boost to the renewable energy sector and an environmentally sensible way to offset the power needs of the desalination plant.

— Sydney Water: chapter 5 of the 2010 Metropolitan Water Plan

== Awards ==
The Sydney Desalination Plant was named "Desalination Plant of the Year" at the 2011 Global Water Awards in Berlin.

The refinancing of Sydney Desalination Plant won the "Project of the Year Award" at the Infrastructure Partnerships Australia's 2013 National Infrastructure Awards.

== Controversies ==
Water quality concerns regarding the proximity of the seawater inlet to the desalination plant to the nearby sewage ocean outfall.

Environmental economists from the Australian National University studied the project after its completion and determined that "it was a costly decision that did not need to be made while dam levels were high." In 2014, it was reported that the desalination plant was costing the taxpayers $534,246 per day as the plant sits idle. This was the price that the NSW Liberal-National Coalition government agreed upon when they set the 50-year lease with the plant's owners upon privatisation in 2011. To turn off the desalination plant all together would cost an extra $50 million.

== See also ==
- List of desalination plants in Australia
- Reverse osmosis plant

== Sources ==
- "Desalination". Sydney Water. https://web.archive.org/web/20131203064148/http://www.sydneywater.com.au/SW/teachers-students/facts-about-water/secondary-students/how-does-water-get-to-our-taps-/desalination/index.htm.
- Sydney gets its first taste of desalinated water – ABC News, 2010-01-28.
- Areas to receive from desalination plant as part or all of their water supply (250 ML a day) – sydneywater.com
