= Adelaide Desalination Plant =

Seawater desalination plant in South Australia

Coordinates: 35°5′48.7″S 138°29′2.6″E

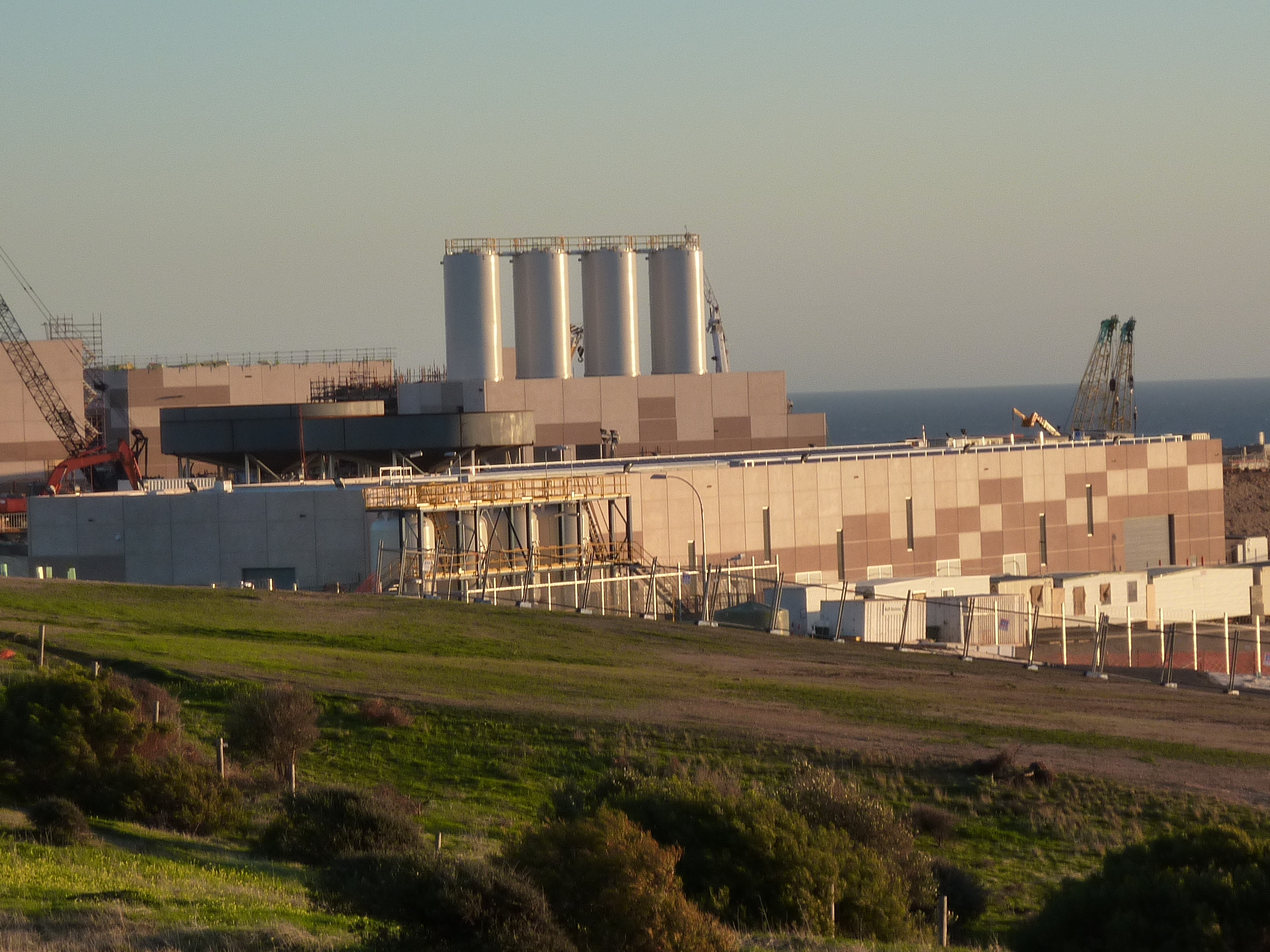
- Interactive map of Adelaide Desalination Plant
- Location: Lonsdale, South Australia
- Daily capacity: 300 megalitres per day
- Annual capacity: 100 gigalitres per annum
- Cost: A$1.83 billion
- Energy generation offset: Renewable (TBA)
- Technology: Reverse Osmosis
- Percent of water supply: 50% of Adelaide
- Completion date: December 2012
- Website: www.sawater.com.au

The Adelaide Desalination Plant (ADP), formerly known as the Port Stanvac Desalination Plant, is a sea water reverse osmosis desalination plant located in Lonsdale, South Australia which has the capacity to provide the city of Adelaide with up to 50% of its drinking water needs.

In September 2007, South Australian Premier Mike Rann announced that the State Government would fund and build a desalination plant to ensure Adelaide's water supply against drought. The plant was financed and built by SA Water, a state-owned corporation.

The plant was initially planned to have a capacity of 50 gigalitres (GL) of water per year but was later doubled in capacity to 100 GL/year with the assistance of funding from the Australian Government. The expanded capacity represents around 50% of Adelaide's domestic water supply.

The project has engaged professional political lobbyists, including Michael O'Reilly.

The plant was completed on time and within the original budget ($1.83 billion).

Stage one of the plant commenced operations in October 2011, and stage two commenced in July 2012. The plant was officially opened on 26 March 2013.

The Adelaide Desalination Project is the largest infrastructure project that the State of South Australia has funded, owns, and has completed successfully.

Since 2012, the plant has operated at 10% of its capacity for much of the time, to keep it functioning. In 2017, it produced 2% of the state's water supply.

Due to low rainfall in 2024, in January 2025 the plant's production increased to its full capacity of 300 megalitres (ML) of water per day.

== Background ==
South Australia, as the "driest state in the driest (inhabited) continent", has experienced severe water shortages during periods of drought. As drought conditions worsened during 2006-7, reduced inflows into the River Murray lead to the introduction of progressively harsher water restrictions and the future of Adelaide's water supply came to the fore as a political issue.

In light of the drought, South Australian Premier Mike Rann announced on 11 September 2007 that the State Government would fund and build a desalination plant to guarantee Adelaide's water supply. He said the plant would provide an insurance policy against future droughts and cost more than $1.4 billion.

In the leadup to the November 2007 federal election campaign Prime Minister John Howard promised that, if re-elected, his Coalition government would contribute towards the capital cost of a desalination plant to reduce the city's dependence on the River Murray. Then Opposition Leader Kevin Rudd made similar pledges.

== Location ==
The site for the main desalination plant was purchased by SA Water from ExxonMobil in December 2008. Construction commenced in March 2009.

The plant is located on the eastern shore of Gulf St Vincent just north of ExxonMobil's disused Port Stanvac Oil Refinery. It lies within the industrial suburb of Lonsdale within the local government area of the City of Onkaparinga. The residential area just north of the plant lies within the suburb of Hallett Cove (part of the City of Marion).

== Funding, cost and capacity ==
The plant was originally intended to be capable of producing 50 GL per year and projected to cost almost $1.4 billion.

During late 2008 and early 2009, the South Australian Government was actively considering doubling the capacity to 100 GL/year at an incremental cost of around $450 million. It sought funding from the Australian Government for the full cost of this expansion.

In May 2009 the Australian Government, under Prime Minister Rudd, announced a grant of $100 million to support the initial stage of the project under the National Urban Water and Desalination Plan. This announcement fulfilled Rudd's commitment during the 2007 election campaign.

As part of this announcement, the Australian Government also committed a further $228 million for the expansion to 100 GL/year. The South Australian Government subsequently committed to the expansion in June 2009.

The final capital cost of A$1.83 billion for the Adelaide Desalination Project included:

1. The desalination plant and associated marine works
2. A pumping station and 12 km transfer pipeline to take the desalinated water to the Happy Valley Reservoir Treatment Plant (treated water tanks) where it is blended with treated catchment rainwater and delivered into the SA Water distribution system
3. SA Power Networks electricity supply sub-station
4. Preliminary site works, land and other interconnection work with SA Water's existing facilities.

== Construction ==
=== Timeline ===
In February 2008, the State Government appointed SA Water as the lead agency responsible for the delivery of the project and also appointed a steering committee of chief executives of key agencies to provide strategic oversight and review of all key decisions prior to approval by the SA Water Board and or the Government and Parliament; this steering committee had an independent chair (Mr Kevin Osborn).

In February 2008, the SA government approved an initial funding of $9.5M for the design, construction, operation and maintenance of a small Temporary Pilot Desalination Plant with a capacity of 100,000 litres per day. Construction of this temporary pilot plant commenced in June 2008 and was completed on 4 August 2008. The pilot plant was operated for two years through to October 2010 and provided valuable information to further optimise the design of the main plant.

The procurement process for the construction of the plant was:

- Expressions of interest (July 2008)
- Request for proposal to short-listed respondents (September 2008)
- Evaluation and negotiation
- Contract execution (February 2009).

The preferred respondent was a consortium (AdelaideAqua D&C) consisting of McConnell Dowell, Abigroup and Acciona. A 20-year operations and maintenance contract was awarded to AdelaideAqua Pty Ltd, a consortium comprising Acciona and Trility.

Completion of the initial 50 GL/year stage was initially targeted for the end of June 2012. Subsequently, with deteriorating drought in South Australia, the project was fast-tracked to compress the planning and procurement program and target early 'first water' (or 10% of plant output) up to 12 months earlier, followed by progressive completion of the remaining 50 GL per year plant.

The first stage of the project began producing drinking water in October 2011, and the expanded plant began producing drinking water in July 2012.

The plant was officially opened on 26 March 2013.

=== Plant design ===
The Adelaide Desalination Plant removes salt from, or desalinates, seawater using the process of reverse osmosis. This involves three main stages:

- Stage 1: Pre-treatment to remove particulate (non-dissolved) material from the seawater. Pre-treatment at the plant is achieved in three steps. Band screens remove coarse solids greater than 3mm from the water before it is pumped into the plant. Disc filters filter the water further, removing material larger than 0.1 mm (100 micron). Ultra-filtration membranes then remove material larger than 0.04 micron, including bacteria and most viruses.
- Stage 2: Reverse-osmosis to remove dissolved salts from the water. The water is pumped through a full two pass reverse osmosis system (i.e. all water passes through two separate reverse osmosis membranes) where dissolved salts are progressively removed. Approximately 48.5% of the feed water is converted to low salinity water, termed permeate, while the remainder is returned to the sea as saline concentrate.
- Stage 3: Post-treatment to prepare the water for distribution. The permeate from the reverse osmosis system is stabilised and then chlorinated and fluoridated ready for distribution. It is stored in 50 megalitre tanks onsite before it is transferred to the Happy Valley Water Treatment Plant through the transfer pump Station.

=== Workplace safety ===
The health and safety of all workers and stakeholders associated with the project was a key concern for SA Water and the AdelaideAqua consortium.

In July 2010, worker Brett Fritsch was killed by a steel beam which fell from a soft sling at the construction site. Following a Safework SA investigation, the rigging company Ferro Con SA and its director Paolo Maione were found to be responsible and each was fined $200,000 by the Industrial Court. No charges were laid on SA Water or the principal contractor, AdelaideAqua.

=== Awards and recognition ===
The Adelaide Desalination Project has been internationally recognised by professional organisations, industry bodies and independent judges. Awards include:

- Project Management Institute (PMI), USA, Global Project of the Year Award 2013
- International Project Management Association (PMI), The Netherlands, Project Excellence Award, Gold Medal Winner in the category of Mega Projects 2013
- Project Management Institute (Australia), National Project of the Year Award 2013
- Water Industry Alliance, Smart Water Awards, Winner in the category of Planning and Delivery 2013
- Engineers Australia (South Australian Branch), Engineering Excellence Award, Commendation in the category of Project Infrastructure 2013
- Global Water Intelligence, Desalination Plant of the Year, Distinction Award 2013
- South Australian Water Corporation, Certificate and Award for the Project Team and Individual Team Members - Overall SA Water Values Award Winner 2012
- National Electrical and Communications Association, National Excellence Award, Winner in Category 6 - Large Industrial 2012
- Australian Water Association (South Australian Branch), Winner in the category of Infrastructure Innovation 2012
- Civil Contractor's Federation, Earth Awards, Winner in the category of Projects greater than $75 million contract value 2012
- Master Builders Association (South Australian Branch), Excellence in Services, Category 6 Winner 2012.

== Energy use and supply ==
The SA and Australian governments agreed to make all power used by the plant renewable.

The plant uses 3.47 to 3.70 kilowatt-hours of electricity per kilolitre of water produced.

The plant sources all its electricity from 100% GreenPower accredited Renewable Energy sources from within South Australia. The plant sources its electricity from renewable energy sources provided by AGL Energy under a 20-year contract at an annual cost initially estimated at over $75 million per year (for the first 50 GL plant). Energy supply cost is part of the overall operating cost of the facility which was confirmed by SA Water in December 2010 at $130 million per year (for double the capacity or 100 GL plant). SA Water advised that the $130 million per year would result in one of the lowest operating cost per unit of desalinated drinking water of any desalination plant in Australia. This was possible because of energy efficient technologies and innovations throughout the plant.

The plant's buildings have been designed to maximise natural light during the day and a selection of high thermal materials (e.g. solid precast concrete walls and insulation) to improve thermal properties, thereby minimising energy consumption. More specifically, solar photovoltaic cells have been placed on the reverse osmosis buildings for localised power generation. Each reverse osmosis building has an approximately 100 kW solar cell array providing a site capacity of approximately 200 kW at peak sun hours. The high pressure pumps feeding the reverse-osmosis membranes are the largest consumers of energy in the plant. Energy recovery devices are installed to harness the pressure in the saline concentrate stream and use it to pressurise some of the feed water. As a result, the high pressure pumps are only needed to deliver half of the water feeding the reverse osmosis system, reducing energy consumption in the plant by up to 40 per cent. Likewise, two turbine generators in the outfall tunnel take advantage of the plant elevation 50 metres above sea level. This mini-hydroelectric system is capable of producing 1,290 kW of renewable electricity which is fed back into the plant, reducing energy consumption by approximately 2.5%.

== Effects on marine life ==
The lack of tidal movement for up to 2–3 days during dodge tides, which occur twice a month in Gulf St Vincent, reduces mixing of the water column. This raised concerns during the planning phase of the project about the potential effects of the brine discharge on benthic flora and fauna.

Dodge tides and other local conditions were taken into account in the design of the outfall system. Discharge to the sea occurs via a 1,080 m undersea tunnel, with dispersal through one of 6 specially designed diffusers. Each diffuser has a head consisting of four duck bill valves that assist in maintaining high discharge velocity for optimum mixing, independent of plant operating conditions.

Marine monitoring buoys placed at 100-metre radius from the outfall structures allow real time data monitoring via the plant control system, to assess performance against Environment Protection Agency discharge licence conditions. Monitoring of the surrounding marine environment started before construction of the plant began and will continue into the future to ensure no adverse environmental impact.

== Utilisation and controversy ==
The Adelaide Desalination Plant has been controversial as the high cost of construction has contributed to water price increases, even when the plant is not in use. While the plant was used quite intensively between 2013 and 2015, its utilisation has reduced due to greater water availability in metropolitan reservoirs and from the Murray River. This is shown in the table below, which demonstrates that the plant produced around 8 GL in the year from November 2015 to October 2016, compared to over 100 GL between December 2012 and October 2015.

Date	Water produced since plant start
December 2012	17 GL
20 October 2015	126.3 GL
End October 2016	134 GL

As of January 2016, the desalination plant was continuing to run at around 10 per cent capacity, despite having sufficient reservoir capacity and water allocation from the Murray River.

During the course of determining water prices for South Australia, the Essential Services Commission of South Australia (ESCOSA) commissioned expert engineering advice from to assess SA Water's proposal to operate the desalination plant at minimum capacity, rather than place it into 'cold standby'. Based on this advice, ESCOSA allowed for SA Water to recover $4.1 million per year to cover the cost of operating the plant in minimum operation mode (approximately 8 GL/year), noting that doing so:

- may defer capital upgrades elsewhere in SA Water's supply network (though the associated cost savings were highly uncertain)
- could improve security of supply for customers who rely solely on the Happy Valley Treatment Plant for supply
- gives SA Water flexibility to undertake maintenance on other assets
- could allow it to respond to water quality issues arising elsewhere in the supply network.

== Performance of the diffuser system ==
An independent study revealed that salinity anomalies used to calculate dilution ratios have never been correctly derived. The new corrected analysis suggests that low brine discharges of 100 ML/day already create salinity anomalies of ~1 ppt at the edge of the mixing zone. The data indicate that maximum discharges >300 ML/day in austral summer 2025 exceeded the regulated salinity threshold of 1.3 ppt. According to the study, associated dilution ratios of as low as 10:1 were significantly lower than the required 50:1 ratio that assures 99% species protection.

== November 2019 startup ==
In November 2019 an agreement was reached between the Australian Federal Government and the South Australian government to significantly increase production of water to supply the Adelaide metropolitan area. The agreement was reached to allow farmers affected by drought to access more water from the Murray River.

Since much of Adelaide's household water supply is sourced from the River Murray, allowing the desalination plant to produce the city's water frees allocation from the river to be used upstream. The river water saved will then be allocated to drought-affected farmers along the river's irrigation area with farmers in this area able to bid for the water at a discounted rate.

The development of a solar farm on 14 hectares of land adjacent to the desalination plant is expected to significantly reduce the plant's electricity bills.

== 2025 increase in production ==
Following an exceptionally dry 2024, South Australian reservoirs were at their lowest for twenty years. Consequently, in January 2025 the plant increased production to 300 megalitres (ML) of water per day (compared to 17 ML in January 2024). This limited the need for the water restrictions that were widespread during dry summers earlier in the century.

== Gallery ==
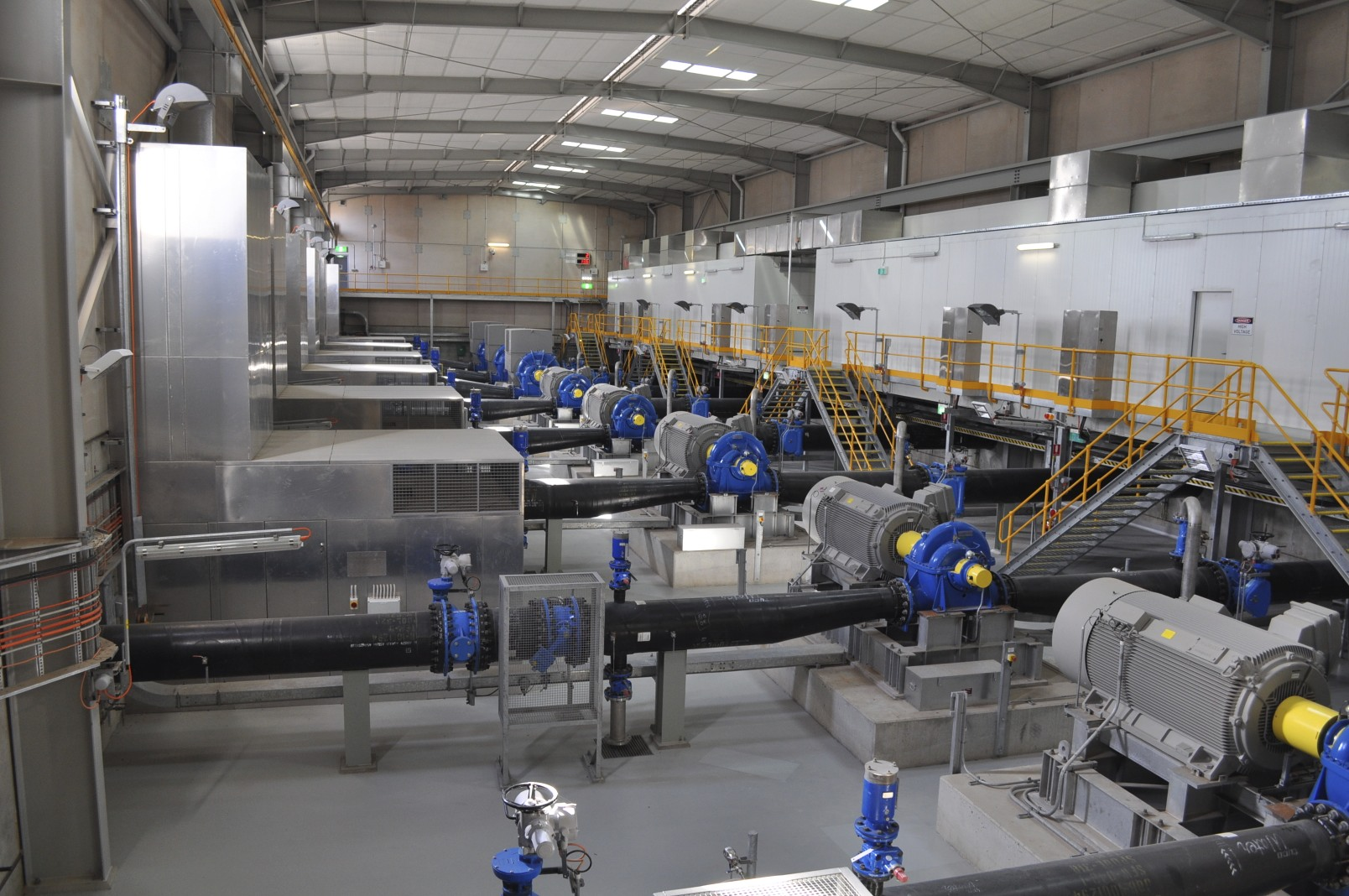
Transfer Pump Station

== See also ==
- List of desalination plants in Australia
- Reverse osmosis plant
