= List of desalination plants in Australia =

As a result of the water supply crisis during the severe 1997–2009 drought State governments around Australia began building desalination plants that purify seawater using reverse osmosis technology. Many of these plants have included in their overall cost the building of renewable energy sources such as wind farms.

Australia's first working desalination plant was the Perth Seawater Desalination Plant that was completed in November 2006. A second plant on the Gold Coast began operations in February 2009. The Kurnell Desalination Plant in Sydney opened in January 2010.

== List of desalination plants ==
=== Desalination plants in use ===
Plant	Capacity (Megalitres per day)	Capacity (Gigalitres per year)	Percent of water supply - at full capacity	Current status	Location	Completion
Gold Coast Desalination Plant	125	45	27% of South East Queensland	Operating at a minimum production level	Queensland (Tugun) 28.157°S 153.497°E	2009
Perth Seawater Desalination Plant	130	48	17% of Perth	Provides 45 gigalitres a year	Western Australia (Kwinana) 32.203°S 115.773°E	2006
Southern Seawater Desalination Plant (Binningup)	270	100	20% of Perth		Western Australia (Binningup) 33.129°S 115.703°E	2012
Sydney Desalination Plant	250	84	15% of Sydney		New South Wales (Kurnell) 34.02475°S 151.205136°E	2012
Adelaide Desalination Plant	300	100	50% of Adelaide	Operating at a minimum production level supplying 10% of SA water	South Australia (Port Stanvac) 35.097°S 138.484°E	2012
Victorian Desalination Plant	410	150	33% of Melbourne		Victoria (Dalyston) 38°35′16.8″S 145°31′33.6″E	2012

=== Smaller desalination plants ===
State	Location	Capacity (Megalitres per day)	Status	Year Commissioned
Western Australia	Albany (Cape Riche)	34	Approved 2012	
Western Australia	Barrow Island (Gorgon gas project)	7	Operating	
Western Australia	Burrup (West Pilbara)	16.4	Operating	
Western Australia	Cape Preston (Sino Iron project, Pilbara)	140	Operating	
Western Australia	Esperance	45	Proposed 2011	
Western Australia	Garden Island (Navy Base)	Unknown	Q1 2014	
Western Australia	Karratha	175	Planning	
Western Australia	Long Island (Houtman Abrolhos)	0.017	Operating	
Western Australia	Onslow (Wheatstone LNG)	11		
Western Australia	Rottnest Island	0.55	Operating	
Western Australia	Undecided	150	Planning	
South Australia	Hawker	0.44	Operating	
South Australia	Kangaroo Head (Penneshaw, Kangaroo Island)	0.3	Operating	
South Australia	Leigh Creek	not known	Operating	
South Australia	Marion Bay	0.06	Operating	2008
South Australia	Port Augusta (Sundrop Farms)	8	Operating	
South Australia	Sleaford Bay	8	Planning 2018/19	
South Australia	Whyalla Steelworks (Arrium)	4	Operating	
Queensland	Green Island	0.06	Operating	
Queensland	Hamilton Island	1.5	Operating	
Queensland	Hook Island	?	Operating	
Queensland	Long Island (Club Crocodile)	0.12	Operating	
Queensland	St. Agnes / 1770 (Gladstone)	1.5	Operating	2010
Offshore	Christmas Island	4.5	Operating	
Offshore	Home Island (Cocos & Keeling Islands)	0.35	Under construction 2014	
Offshore	Timor Sea (Ichthys LNG)	0.5	?	

Secondary desalination plants, citations

=== Desalination plants in development or cancelled ===
Plant	Capacity (Megalitres per day)	Location	Notes
Alkimos	unknown	Western Australia	Under construction, scheduled to open in 2028
Anketell Point (Pilbara)	9.6	Western Australia	Approved 2013 then cancelled
Bribie Island	unknown	Queensland	In dispute
North Stradbroke Island	unknown	Queensland	In dispute
Northern Water Project, Whyalla	140	South Australia	Proposed
Onslow Desalination Plant	2	Western Australia	
Point Lowly, Port Bonython (BHP)	280	South Australia	Approved 2011, not constructed, cancelled
Point Paterson Desalination Plant	15	South Australia	Project cancelled
Port Spencer, Lipson Cove (Centrex Metals)	14-55	South Australia	Project cancelled
Sunshine Coast	unknown	Queensland	Suggested after 2028
Toukley	20	New South Wales	Approved 2007, construction deferred

== See also ==
- Energy in Australia
- Seawater desalination in Australia
