= Southern Seawater Desalination Plant =

Plant supplying water to Perth, Western Australia

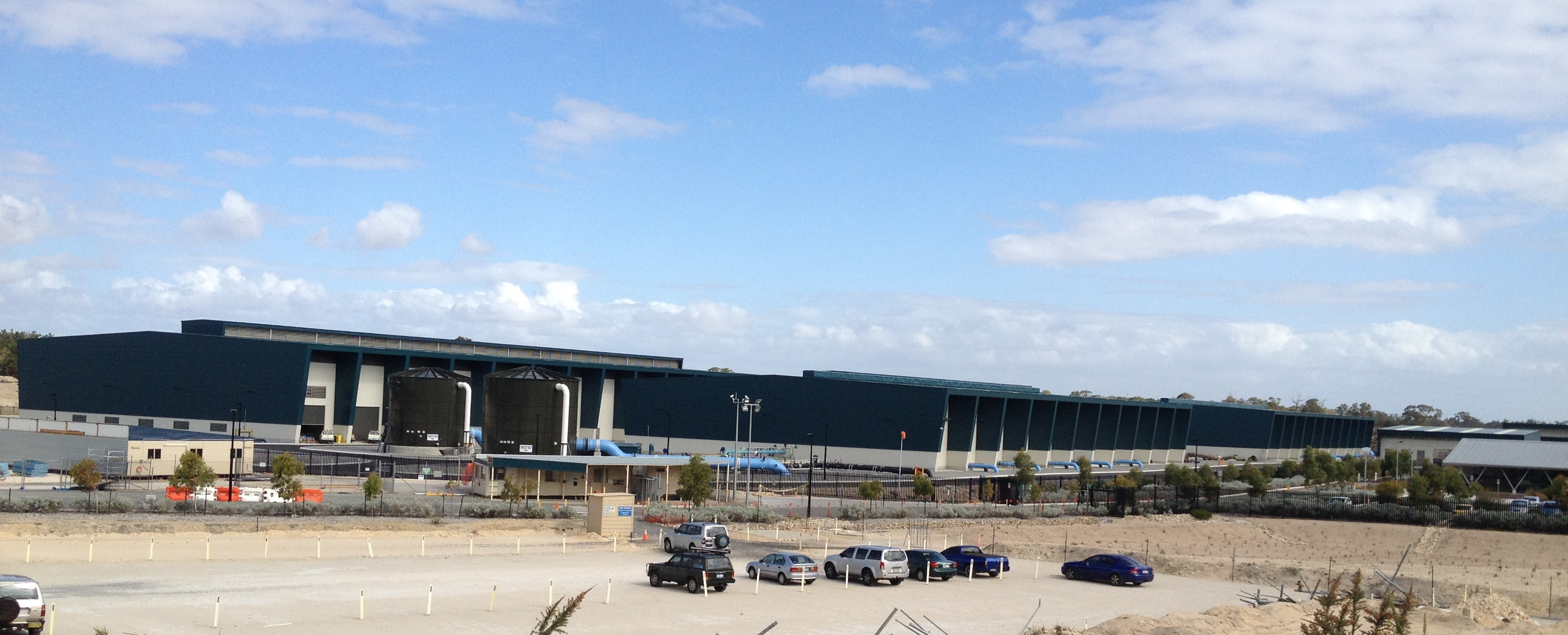
- Binningup Desalination Plant

- Location within Western Australia
- Interactive map of Southern Seawater Desalination Plant
- Location: Binningup, Western Australia
- Coordinates: 33.128556°S 115.702894°E
- Estimated output: 300 ML (11×10^{6} cu ft) per day
- Cost: A$955 million
- Energy generation offset: Renewable (TBA)
- Technology: Reverse Osmosis
- Percent of water supply: Up to 33% of Perth demand
- Operation date: January 2013

The Binningup Desalination Plant is a desalination plant near Binningup, Western Australia, about 150 kilometres (93 mi) south of Perth. It supplies water to the state capital Perth, as well as the nearby regional city of Bunbury and is known as the Southern Seawater Desalination Project. It was designed to initially deliver 50 gigalitres (13 billion US gallons) of potable water per year but was expanded to deliver 100 gigalitres (26 billion US gallons) of potable water per year, or 33% of Perth's requirements. The plant was officially opened in September 2011 at reduced output, and was completed and operating at full capacity in January 2013.

The site is in Taranto Road, Binningup, about 1,200 metres (3,900 ft) from the coast with most of the plant situated in a now disused limestone quarry. The project includes the laying of a 30-kilometre (19 mi), 1,300-millimetre (51 in) pipeline to deliver potable water to the South West Integrated System via a storage facility near Harvey. The Harvey facility has one 33-megalitre (8.7-million-US-gallon) storage tank operational with another one under construction. There is allowance at the site for four 32-megalitre (8.5-million-US-gallon) storage tanks.

== See also ==
- List of desalination plants in Australia
- Reverse osmosis plant
