= Perth Seawater Desalination Plant =

Seawater desalination plant in Western Australia

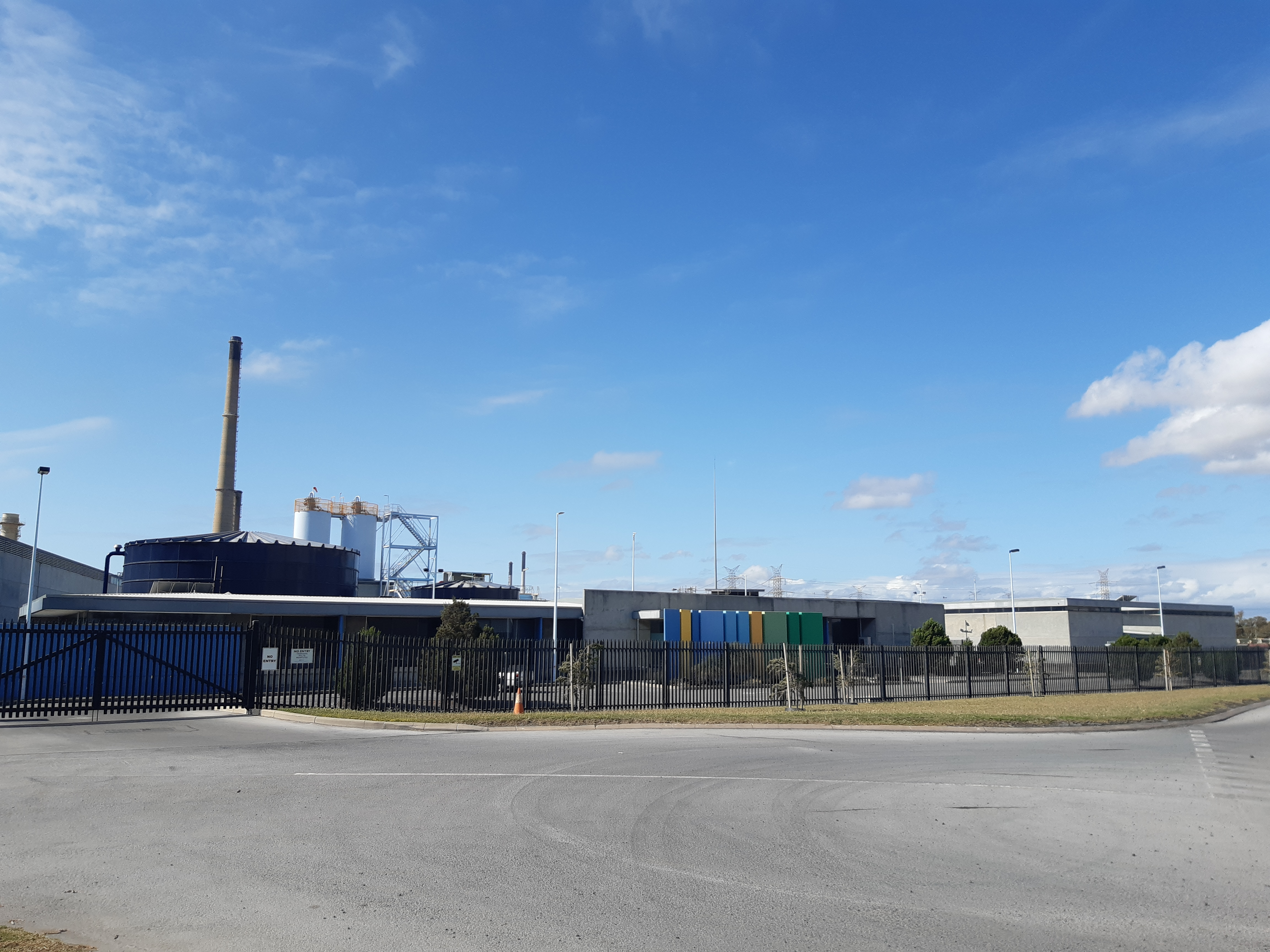
- The Perth Seawater Desalination Plant seen from the south, September 2020

- Location within the Perth metropolitan area
- Interactive map of Perth Seawater Desalination Plant
- Location: Naval Base, Western Australia
- Coordinates: 32.203310°S 115.773282°E
- Estimated output: 144 megalitres per day
- Extended output: 250 ML/d (66×10^{6} US gal/d)
- Cost: A$389 million
- Energy usage: 180 GWh/year
- Energy generation offset: Emu Downs Wind Farm
- Technology: Reverse osmosis
- Percent of water supply: 17% of Perth
- Operation date: November 2006

The Perth Seawater Desalination Plant, located in Naval Base, Kwinana, south of Perth, Western Australia, turns seawater from Cockburn Sound into nearly 140 megalitres (37 million US gallons) of drinking water per day, supplying the Perth metropolitan area.

The salt water reverse-osmosis (SWRO) plant was the first of its kind in Australia, and became operational in 2006. It covers around 10 hectares (25 acres) in an industrial park near the suburb of Kwinana Beach. Electricity for the plant is generated by the 80 MW Emu Downs Wind Farm located in the state's Midwest region near Cervantes. The wind farm contributes 270 GWh/year into the general power grid, more than offsetting the 180 GWh/year requirement from the desalination plant.

The desalination plant, with 12 SWRO trains with a capacity of 160 megalitres (42 million US gallons) per day and six BWRO (brackish water) trains delivering a final product of 144 megalitres (38 million US gallons) per day, was expected to have one of the world's lowest specific energy consumption, due in part to the use of pressure exchanger energy recovery devices supplied by Energy Recovery Inc. The devices are isobaric chamber types which recover energy in the brine stream and deliver it to water going to the membrane feed at a net transfer efficiency at up to 98%.

As a condition of its continued operation, the Perth plant has a comprehensive environmental monitoring program, measuring the seawater intake and brine outfall. Excess water from the plant is stored in the dams situated in the Darling Scarp.

In early 2008, the plant was shut down on two occasions due to reduced dissolved oxygen levels in Cockburn Sound.

== See also ==
- List of desalination plants in Australia
- Reverse osmosis plant
- Seawater desalination in Australia
- Alkimos Seawater Desalination Plant
