= Solar-powered desalination unit =

A solar-powered desalination unit produces potable water from saline water through direct or indirect methods of desalination powered by solar energy.

Direct solar desalination, such as a solar sill, produces distillate directly in the solar collector. The device traps the sun's energy to obtain freshwater through the process of evaporation and condensation. Indirect solar desalination incorporates solar energy collection systems with conventional desalination systems such as multi-stage flash distillation, multiple effect evaporation, freeze separation or reverse osmosis to produce freshwater.

== Direct solar desalination ==
=== Solar stills ===
A solar still is a type of solar desalination unit similar to a condensation trap. A solar still distills water using the heat of the Sun to drive evaporation from humid soil and ambient air to cool a condenser film. There are two basic types of solar stills, a pit still and a box still, both of which typically produce only a small amount of water, depending on environmental conditions.

=== Pit still ===
Pit still

A pit still works by using heat from the sun to collect moisture from the ground. A hole is dug in a sunny location, and a clean collection container is placed in the center. Moist soil, green plants, or nonpoisonous vegitation can be placed around the container to increase the amount of moisture available. The pit is then covered tightly with clear plastic, and the edges are sealed with soil or rocks. A small stone is placed in the center of the plastic directly about the container, creating a low point. As the sun heats the pit, moisture evaporates from the soil and plants, rises, and condenses on the cooler underside of the plastic. The droplets run toward the lowest point and drip into the container.

Pit stills typically produce about 0.25 to 1 liter (1 to 4 cups) of water a day, although a well built still in hot, sunny conditions with moist soil can produce up to 1.5 liters of water per day.

=== Box still ===
A box still distills water by recreating the natural water cycle inside a closed container. Water is placed in a shallow basin, where heat from sunlight causes it to evaporate. As the water turns to vapor, most salts, minerals, dirt, and microorganisms are let behind. The vapor rises and touches the cooler, sloped lid of the box, where it condenses back into liquid droplets. These droplets then run down the lid into a separate clean collection container.

The system works best when the basin is dark to absorb heat, the lid is clear, and the box is insulated. Box stills are usually slow and produce only a limited amount of water. They also might not remove colatile chemicals, such as solvents, gasoline components, or certain pesticides, because those substances can evaporate and condense along with the water.

A basic box still typically produces about 2 to 5 liters (8 to 21 cups) of distilled water per square meter of basin area each sunny day.

== Indirect solar desalination ==
Indirect solar desalination systems comprise two sub-systems: a solar collection system and a desalination system. The solar collection system is used, either to collect heat using solar collectors and supply it via a heat exchanger to a thermal desalination process, or to convert electromagnetic solar radiation to electricity using photovoltaic cells to power an electricity-driven desalination process.

=== Solar-powered reverse osmosis ===
Osmosis is a natural phenomenon in which water passes through a membrane from a lower to a higher concentration solution. The flow of water can be reversed if a pressure larger than the osmotic pressure is applied on the higher concentration side. In reverse osmosis desalination systems, seawater pressure is raised above the natural osmotic pressure, forcing pure water through membrane pores to the fresh water side. Reverse osmosis (RO) is the most common desalination process in terms of installed capacity due to its superior energy efficiency compared to thermal desalination systems, despite requiring extensive water pre-treatment. Furthermore, part of the consumed mechanical energy can be reclaimed from the concentrated brine effluent with an energy recovery device.

Solar-powered RO desalination is common in demonstration plants due to the modularity and scalability of both photovoltaic (PV) and RO systems. A detailed economic analysis and a thorough optimisation strategy of PV powered RO desalination were carried out with favorable results reported. Economic and reliability considerations are the main challenges to improving PV powered RO desalination systems. However, the quickly dropping PV panel costs are making solar-powered desalination ever more feasible.

Groundwater (which may contain dissolved salts or other contaminants) or surface water (which may have high turbidity or contain microorganisms) is pumped into a tank with an ultrafiltration membrane, which removes viruses and bacteria. This water is fit for cleaning and bathing. Ten percent of that water undergoes nanofiltration and reverse osmosis in the second stage of purification, which removes salts and trace contaminants, producing drinking water. A photovoltaic solar array tracks the Sun and powers the pumps needed to process the water, using the plentiful sunlight available in remote regions of Australia not served by the power grid.

Solar photo voltaic power is considered a viable option to power a reverse osmosis desalination plant. The techno-economics both in standalone mode and in PV-biodisel hybrid mode for capacities from 0.05 MLD to 300 MLD were examined by researchers at IIT Madras. As a technology demonstrator, a plant of 500 litre /day capacity has been designed, installed and functional there.

==== Energy storage ====
While the intermittent nature of sunlight and its variable intensity throughout the day makes desalination during nighttime challenging, several energy storage options can be used to permit 24 hour operation. Batteries can store solar energy for use at night. Thermal energy storage systems ensure constant performance at night or on cloudy days, improving overall efficiency. Alternatively, stored gravitational energy can be harnessed to provide energy to a solar-powered reverse osmosis unit during non-sunlight hours.

== See also ==
- Solar desalination
- Solar still
