= Reverse osmosis plant =

Type of water purification plant

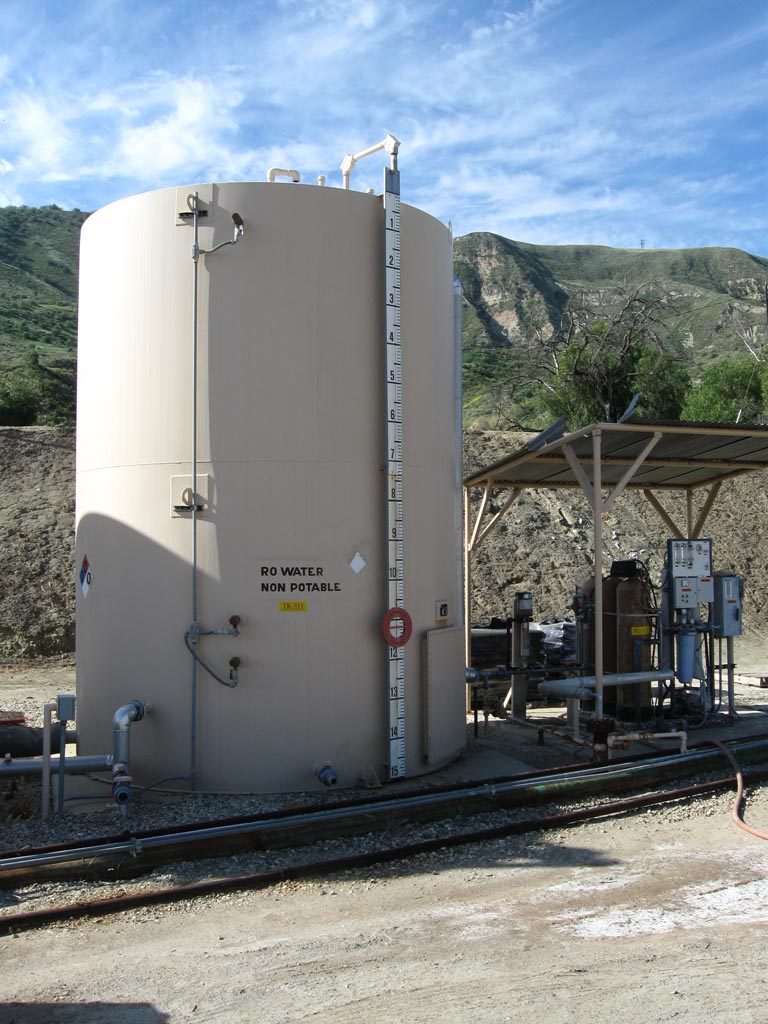
Reverse Osmosis plant at an oil field

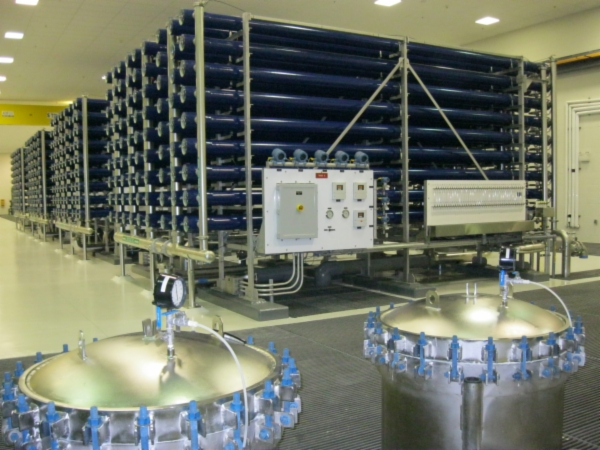
RO production train, North Cape Coral RO Plant

A reverse osmosis plant is a manufacturing plant where the process of reverse osmosis takes place. Reverse osmosis is a common process to purify or desalinate contaminated water by forcing water through a membrane. Water produced by reverse osmosis may be used for a variety of purposes, including desalination, wastewater treatment, concentration of contaminants, and the reclamation of dissolved minerals. An average modern reverse osmosis plant needs six kilowatt-hours of electricity to desalinate one cubic metre of water. The process also results in an amount of salty briny waste. The challenge for these plants is to find ways to reduce energy consumption, use sustainable energy sources, improve the process of desalination and to innovate in the area of waste management to deal with the waste. Self-contained water treatment plants using reverse osmosis, called reverse osmosis water purification units, are normally used in a military context.

== System Operation ==
Reverse osmosis plants require a variety of pre-treatment techniques including softening, dechlorination, and anti-scalent treatment. Following pre-treatment, high levels of pressure send water through a semi-permeable membrane, which retains all contaminants but lets pure water pass through. Energy requirements depend on the concentration of salts and contaminants in the influent water; higher concentrations requires more energy to treat.

== In operation ==
In 1977 Cape Coral, Florida became the first municipality in the United States to use the RO process on a large scale with an initial operating capacity of 11,356 m³ (3 million gallons) per day. By 1985, due to the rapid growth in population of Cape Coral, the city had the largest low pressure reverse osmosis plant in the world, capable of producing 56,782 m³ (15 million gallons) per day.

In Israel at Ashkelon on the Mediterranean coast, the world's largest reverse osmosis plant is producing 396,000 m³ of water a day at around possibly US$0.50 per m³.

In western Saudi Arabia at Yanbu, production started in 1999 at 106,904 m³ of water a day. Later in 2009 with some expansion the production reached to 132,000 m³ of water a day.

In Sindh Province Pakistan the provincial government has installed 382 reverse osmosis plants in the province out of which 207 are installed in backward areas of Sindh which includes districts of Thar, Thatta, Badin, Sukkur, Shaheed, Benazirabad, Noshero, Feroz, and others while 726 are on the final stage of their completion.

In China a desalination plant was planned for Tianjin in 2010, to produce 100,000 m³ of desalinated seawater a day. In Spain in 2004, 20 reverse osmosis plants were planned to be built along the Costas, expecting to meet slightly over 1% of Spain's total water needs.

Nearly 17% of drinking water in Perth, Australia comes from a reverse osmosis plant that desalinates sea water. Perth is an ideal candidate for reverse osmosis plants as it has a relatively dry and arid climate where conventional freshwater resources are scarce, yet it is surrounded by ocean. Western Australia's Water Corporation announced the Perth desalination plant in April 2005. At the time, it was the largest desalination plant using reverse osmosis technology in the southern hemisphere.
