= CANpie =

CANpie (CAN Programming Interface Environment) is an open source project and pursues the objective of creating and establishing an open and standardized software API for access to the CAN bus.

CANpie FD logo

The project was established in 2001 by MicroControl and is licensed under Apache License version 2.0. The current version of the CANpie API covers both classical CAN frames as well as ISO CAN FD frames. The API is designed for embedded control applications as well as for PC interface boards: embedded microcontrollers are programmed in C, a C++ API is provided for OS independent access to interface boards. The API provides ISO/OSI Layer-2 (Data Link Layer) functionality. It is not the intention of CANpie to incorporate higher layer functionality (e.g. CANopen, SAE J1939).

== Driver principle ==
The CANpie API supports the concept of hardware message buffers (mailboxes) with a total limit of 255 buffers. A message buffer has a unique direction (receive or transmit). As an option it is possible to connect a FIFO with arbitrary size to a message buffer for both transfer directions. The total number of CAN channels is limited to 255, the API provides a method to gather information about the features of each CAN hardware channel. This is especially important for an application designer who wants to write the code only once. The CAN frame time-stamping (specified by CiA 603, CAN Frame time-stamping – Requirements for network time management) is supported with a resolution of 1 nano-second.

== Usage ==
CANpie Structure

The following code snippet shows the initialisation of a microcontroller.

#include "cp_core.h"  // CANpie core functions

void MyCanInit(void)
{
   CpPort_ts  tsCanPortT;   // logical CAN port
   //---------------------------------------------------
   // setup the CAN controller / open a physical CAN
   // port
   //
   memset(&tsCanPortT, 0, sizeof(CpPort_ts));
   CpCoreDriverInit(eCP_CHANNEL_1, &tsCanPortT, 0);
   //---------------------------------------------------
   // setup 500 kBit/s
   //
   CpCoreBitrate(&tsCanPortT,
                 eCP_BITRATE_500K,
                 eCP_BITRATE_NONE);
   //---------------------------------------------------
   // start CAN operation
   //
   CpCoreCanMode(&tsCanPortT, eCP_MODE_OPERATION);
   //.. now we are operational
}

== Similar projects ==
For the Linux operating system the projects can4linux and SocketCAN provide support for Classical CAN and ISO CAN FD. The commercial AUTOSAR specification supports CAN FD since version 4.3 and is available only for AUTOSAR partners. The CMSIS-Driver (Cortex Microcontroller Software Interface Standard) specification is a software API that describes peripheral driver interfaces for middleware stacks and user applications on ARM Cortex-M processors.
