= WaterML =

- Developed by: Open Geospatial Consortium
- Latest release: 2.0.1; 2014-02-24
- Type of format: Time series
- Extended from: XML
- Open format?: Yes, with Copyright

WaterML is a technical standard and information model used to represent hydrological time series structures. The current version is WaterML 2.0, released an open standard of the Open Geospatial Consortium (OGC).

== History ==
=== WaterML 1.0 ===
Version 1.0 of WaterML was published in 2009 by the Consortium of Universities for the Advancement of Hydrologic Science. WaterML 1.0 (and 1.1) is an XML exchange format developed for use specifically in the United States.

=== WaterML 2.0 ===
WaterML 2.0 is an open standard of the OGC. Version 2.0 marks a harmonisation with different formats from various organisations and countries, including the Australian Water Data Transfer Format, WaterML 1.0 from the United States, XHydro from Germany, and with existing OGC formats. WaterML 2.0 was adopted as an official standard by the OGC in September 2012, endorsed by the US Federal Geographic Data Committee, and has been proposed for adoption by the World Meteorological Organisation (WMO).

Example uses include: exchange of data for operational hydrological monitoring programs; supporting operation of infrastructure (e.g. dams, supply systems); cross-border exchange of observational data; release of data for public dissemination; enhancing disaster management through data exchange; and exchange in support of national reporting. The standard was developed through a harmonisation process by members of the joint OGC-WMO Hydrology Domain Working Group.

== Structure ==
WaterML 2.0 makes use of existing OGC standards, primarily Observations and Measurements (O&M) and the Geography Markup Language (GML). This enhances consistency and interoperability with other standards and web services. Through use of the O&M standard, WaterML 2.0 defines types allowing for standard definition of the core properties relating to hydrological time series, including:

- The observed phenomenon
- Spatial context
- Temporal bounds
- Procedure used in generating the time series (e.g. raw data from a sensor)
- Result-specific metadata, such as time series qualifiers, interpolation types, comments, quality codes etc.
- Monitoring points
- Collections of related objects
- Vocabularies for domain-specific terms

The core information model is defined using the Unified Modelling Language, allowing for flexibility in creating implementation-specific encodings. The standard defines a GML-conformant XML encoding allowing for use with OGC Web Services.

== See also ==
- Observations and Measurements
- Sensor Observation Service
- Water Data Transfer Format
