= TML =

TML may refer to:

== Musicology ==
- Thesaurus Musicarum Latinarum

== Sport ==
- Taiwan Major League, former baseball league
- Tonga Major League. football league in Tonga
- Toronto Maple Leafs, Canadian ice hockey team

== Transportation ==
- Tamale International Airport, northern Ghana
- Tata Motors Limited, an Indian automotive company
- TransManche Link, Channel Tunnel builder
- Tuen Ma line, a rail line in Hong Kong

== Other meanings ==
- TML Entertainment, record label
- TransducerML, transducer markup language
- Trinidad Muslim League, operating schools in Trinidad and Tobago; see List of schools in Trinidad and Tobago § Run by the TML Islamic Board
