= Datasheet =

Technical document summarizing components

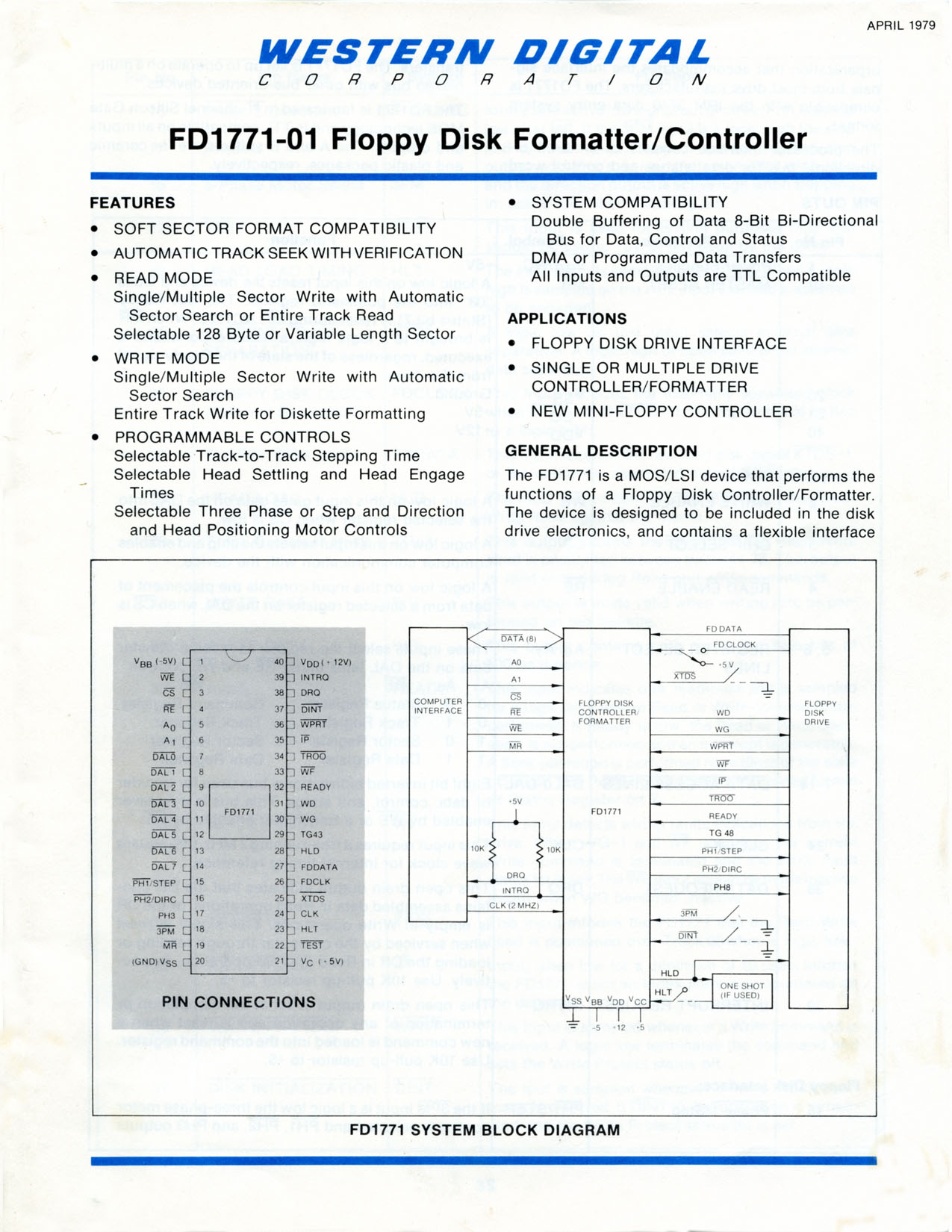
Front page of a floppy disk controller data sheet (1979)

A datasheet, data sheet, or spec sheet is a document that summarizes the performance and other characteristics of a product, machine, component (e.g., an electronic component), material, subsystem (e.g., a power supply), or software in sufficient detail that allows a buyer to understand what the product is and a design engineer to understand the role of the component in the overall system. Typically, a datasheet is created by the manufacturer and begins with an introductory page describing the rest of the document, followed by listings of specific characteristics, with further information on the connectivity of the devices. In cases where there is relevant source code to include, it is usually attached near the end of the document or separated into another file. Datasheets are created, stored, and distributed via product information management or product data management systems.

Depending on the specific purpose, a datasheet may offer an average value, a typical value, a typical range, engineering tolerances, or a nominal value. The type and source of data are usually stated on the datasheet.

A datasheet is usually used for commercial or technical communication to describe the characteristics of an item or product. It can be published by the manufacturer to help people choose products or to help use the products. By contrast, a technical specification is an explicit set of requirements to be satisfied by a material, product, or service.

The ideal datasheet specifies characteristics in a formal structure, according to a strict taxonomy, that allows the information to be processed by a machine. Such machine readable descriptions can facilitate information retrieval, display, design, testing, interfacing, verification, system discovery, and e-commerce. Examples include Open Icecat data-sheets, transducer electronic data sheets for describing sensor characteristics, and electronic device descriptions in CANopen or descriptions in markup languages, such as SensorML.

== Product datasheet information ==
A product data sheet (PDS), like any datasheet, has a different data model per category. It typically contains:

- Identifiers like manufacturer and manufacturer product code, GTIN
- Classification data, such as UNSPSC
- Descriptions such as marketing texts
- Specifications
- Product images
- Feature logos
- Reasons-to-buy
- Leaflets, typically as PDFs
- Manuals, typically in PDF.
- Product videos, 3D objects, and other rich media assets

In Open Icecat, the global open catalog or open content project in which hundreds of manufacturers and thousands of e-commerce sellers participate, the data models of tens of thousands of taxonomy classes are defined, and millions of free PDSs can be found conforming these data-sheet data models.

=== Material safety data sheets ===
A material safety data sheet (MSDS), safety data sheet (SDS), or product safety data sheet (PSDS) is an important component of product stewardship and occupational safety and health. These are required by agencies such as OSHA in its Hazard Communication Standard, 29 C.F.R. 1910.1200. It provides workers with ways to allow them to work in a safe manner and gives them physical data (melting point, boiling point, flash point, etc.), toxicity, health effects, first aid, reactivity, storage, disposal, protective equipment, and spill-handling procedures. The MSDSs differ from country to country, as different countries have different regulations. In some jurisdictions, it is compulsory for the SDS to state the chemical's risks, safety, and effect on the environment.

The SDSs are a commonly used classification for logging information on chemicals, chemical compounds, and chemical mixtures. The SDSs often include the safe use of the chemical and the hazardous nature of the chemical. Anytime chemicals are used these datasheets will be found.

There is a need to have an internationally recognized symbol when describing hazardous substances. Labels can include hazard symbols such as the European Union standard black diagonal cross on an orange background, used to denote a harmful substance.

The purpose of an SDS is not so that the general public will have a knowledge of how to read and understand it, but more so that it can be used in an occupational setting to allow workers to be able to work with it.

=== Chemical data ===
Datasheets and pages are available for specific properties of chemicals in chemical elements data references: example, melting points of the elements (data page). Specific materials have technical data in individual sheets such as ethanol: this includes subjects such as structure and properties, thermodynamic properties, spectral data, vapor pressure, etc. Other chemical datasheets are available from individual producers of chemicals, often on their web pages.

== Datasheets for automobiles ==
Datasheets for automobiles may be described under several names such as features, specs, engineering data, technical summary, etc. They help communicate the technical information about a car to potential buyers and are useful for comparisons with similar cars. They might include: critical inside and outside dimensions, weight, fuel efficiency, engine and drive train, towing capability, safety features and options, warranty, etc.

== Datasheets for datasets ==
After observing the lack of a standard for documenting datasets used for machine learning in the late 2010s, researchers developed "datasheets for datasets", a series of questions for dataset creators to answer and a workflow for how to answer them. These questions involve the motivation behind creating the dataset, the composition of the dataset, how the data was collected, how the data was modified, how the data should or should not be used, how the data is distributed, and how the data is being maintained. Similar frameworks have been proposed by other researchers too.

== Similar documents ==
- Brochure – focuses more on the benefits and advantages of a product and states fewer details, especially fewer quantitative parameters to describe the product. The beginning parts of a brochure and a datasheet for the same product may look the same and include the name of the product, the manufacturer's name, the logo and contact details, a brief description, and a photo of the scheme of the product.
- Catalog – presents a variety of products compared to datasheets, which present one product or a relatively small group of similar products. Catalogs may present many of the parameters that are stated in product datasheets, but they are usually not as comprehensive as datasheets.
- User guide – deals more with the step-by-step usage of a product and may include a brief or complete list of parameters that describe the product, usually as an appendix for the actual user guide document.
- Application note – a document that gives more specific details on using a component in a specific application, or relating to a particular process (e.g., the physical assembly of a product containing the component). An example of note could be, "this content is for the flipped content for ENG." Application notes are especially useful for giving guidance on more unusual uses of a particular component, which would be irrelevant to many readers of the more widely read datasheet. application notes may either be appended to a datasheet or presented as a separate document.
- Technical specification – an explicit set of requirements to be satisfied by a material, product, or service

== See also ==
- Datasheets.com, free resources for electronic component datasheets and purchasing information
- Specification (technical standard)
