= Sensor Web Enablement =

Set of Open Geospatial Consortium standards

Sensor Web Enablement (SWE) is a suite of standards developed and maintained by Open Geospatial Consortium. SWE standards enable developers to make all types of sensors, transducers and sensor data repositories discoverable, accessible and usable via the Web.

SWE Standards include:

- Sensor Observation Service
- Sensor Planning Service
- Observations and Measurements
- Sensor Model Language
- SensorThings API
