= Smart sensor =

Smart sensor may refer to

- Smart transducer, an analog or digital transducer or actuator combined with a processing unit and a communication interface
- A more general term for smart cameras
