= EE Times =

Online electronics industry magazine

- Editor: Nitin Dahad
- Categories: Electronics
- Circulation: 599,349
- Founder: Gerard G. Leeds
- Founded: 1972; 54 years ago
- Final issue: 2012 (print)
- Company: AspenCore Media
- Country: U.S.
- Based in: Centennial, Colorado, U.S.
- Language: English
- Website: www.eetimes.com
- ISSN: 0192-1541
- OCLC: 56085045

EE Times (Electronic Engineering Times) is an electronics industry magazine published in the United States since 1972. EE Times is owned by AspenCore, a division of Arrow Electronics since August 2016.

== History ==
In 1999, the Leeds family sold CMP Publications Inc. to United Business Media for $900 million. After 2000, EE Times moved more into web publishing. The shift in advertising from print to online began to accelerate in 2007, and the periodical shed staff to adjust to the downturn in revenue.

In July 2013, the digital edition migrated to UBM TechWeb's DeusM community platform. On June 3, 2016, UBM announced that EE Times, along with the rest of its electronics media portfolio (EDN, Embedded.com, TechOnline, and Datasheets.com), was being sold to AspenCore Media, a company owned by Arrow Electronics based in Centennial, Colorado for $23.5 million. The acquisition was completed on August 1, 2016.

== Availability ==
EE Times is free for qualified design engineers, managers, and business and corporate management in the electronics industry. It is also available online. EE Times publishes news and columns and features articles on semiconductor manufacturing, communications, electronic design automation, electronic engineering, technology, and products. In November 2012, UBM Electronics announced that the December 2012 issue of EE Times would be the last in print.
