= XDD =

XDD may refer to:

- Gaspé station, the IATA code XDD
- XDD, an electronic data sheet file format
- Nissan Interstar, the fourth generation of Renault Master
