= Flammini =

Flammini is an Italian surname. Notable people with the surname include:

- Alessandra Flammini (born 1960), Italian electrical engineer
- Beatrice Flammini (born 1994), Italian actress
- Maurizio Flammini (born 1949), Italian racing driver
