= Sensor web =

Sensor web is a type of sensor network that heavily utilizes the World Wide Web and is especially suited for environmental monitoring. OGC's Sensor Web Enablement (SWE) framework defines a suite of web service interfaces and communication protocols abstracting from the heterogeneity of sensor (network) communication.

== Definition ==
The term "sensor web" was first used by Kevin Delin of NASA in 1997, to describe a novel wireless sensor network architecture where the individual pieces could act and coordinate as a whole. In this sense, the term describes a specific type of sensor network: an amorphous network of spatially distributed sensor platforms (pods) that wirelessly communicate with each other. This amorphous architecture is unique since it is both synchronous and router-free, making it distinct from the more typical TCP/IP-like network schemes. A pod as a physical platform for a sensor can be orbital or terrestrial, fixed or mobile and might even have real time accessibility via the Internet. Pod-to-pod communication is both omni-directional and bi-directional where each pod sends out collected data to every other pod in the network. Hence, the architecture allows every pod to know what is going on with every other pod throughout the sensor web at each measurement cycle. The individual pods (nodes) were all hardware equivalent and Delin's architecture did not require special gateways or routing to have each of the individual pieces communicate with one another or with an end user. Delin's definition of a sensor web was an autonomous, stand-alone, sensing entity – capable of interpreting and reacting to the data measured – that does not necessarily require the presence of the World Wide Web to function. As a result, on-the-fly data fusion, such as false-positive identification and plume tracking, can occur within the sensor web itself and the system subsequently reacts as a coordinated, collective whole to the incoming data stream. For example, instead of having uncoordinated smoke detectors, a sensor web can react as a single, spatially dispersed, fire locator.

The term "sensor web" has also morphed into sometimes being associated with an additional layer connecting sensors to the World Wide Web. The Sensor Web Enablement (SWE) initiative of the Open Geospatial Consortium (OGC) defines service interfaces which enable an interoperable usage of sensor resources by enabling their discovery, access, tasking, as well as eventing and alerting. By defining standardized service interfaces, a sensor web based on SWE services hides the heterogeneity of an underlying sensor network, its communication details and various hardware components, from the applications built on top of it. OGC's SWE initiative defines the term "sensor web" as an infrastructure enabling access to sensor networks and archived sensor data that can be discovered and accessed using standard protocols and application programming interfaces. Through this abstraction from sensor details, their usage in applications is facilitated.

== Characteristics of Delin's sensor web architecture ==
Delin designed a sensor web as a web of interconnected pods. All pods in a sensor web are equivalent in hardware (there are no special "gateway" or "slave" pods). Nevertheless, there are additional functions that pods can perform besides participating in the general sensor web function. Any pod of a sensor web can be a portal pod and provides users access to the sensor web (both input and output). Access can be provided by RF modem, cell phone connections, laptop connections, or even an Internet server. In some cases, a pod will have an attached removable memory unit (such as a USB stick or a laptop) that stores collected data.

The term of mother pod refers to the pod that contains the master clock of the synchronous sensor web system. The mother pod has no special hardware associated with it, its designation as a mother is merely based on the ID number associated with the pod. Often the mother pod serves as a primary portal point to the Internet, but this is done only for deployment convenience. Early papers referenced the mother pod as "a prime node" if it additionally contained special hardware for a particular type of input/output device (say an RF modem).

Because of the inherent hopping of data within a sensor web, a pod with no attached sensors can be deployed as a relay with the single purpose of facilitating communication between the other pods and to expand the communication range to a particular end-point (such as a mother pod). Sensors can be attached to relay pods at a later time and relays can also serve as portal pods.

Each pod usually contains:

- one or more sensor leading to one or more data channel,
- a processing unit such as a micro-controller or microprocessor,
- a two-way communication component such as a radio and antenna (radio ranges are typically limited by government spectrum requirements; unlicensed bands will allow for communication of a few hundred yards in unobstructed areas, although line of sight is not a requirement),
- an energy source such as a battery coupled with a solar cell,
- a package to protect components against sometimes harsh environment,

Each pod also typically requires a support such as a pole or tripod. The number of pods may vary, with examples of sensor webs with 12 to 30 pods. The shape of a sensor web may impact its usefulness, for instance a particular deployment made sure each pod was in range to communicate with at least two other pods. Sensor web measurement cycles have typically been between 30 seconds and 15 minutes for deployed systems thus far.

Sensor webs consisting of pods have been deployed that have spanned miles and run continuously for years. Sensor webs have been fielded in harsh environments (including deserts, mountain snowpacks, and Antarctica) for the purposes of environmental science and have also proved valuable in urban search and rescue and infrastructure protection. The technology is not only monitoring the environment but sometimes also controlling the environment by actuating devices.

== See also ==
- Internet of Things
- Web of Things
- Observations and Measurements
- Open Geospatial Consortium
- Semantic Sensor Web
- Sensor Grid: Sensor Web Meets Grid Computing
- SensorML
