= Smart transducer =

Analog or digital transducer, actuator, or sensor

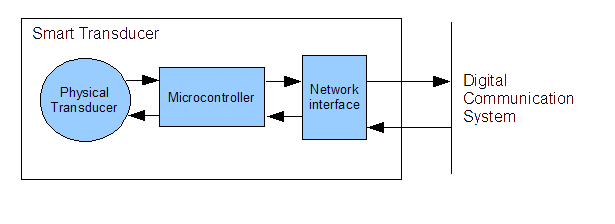
A smart transducer containing a transducer, processing unit and communication interface

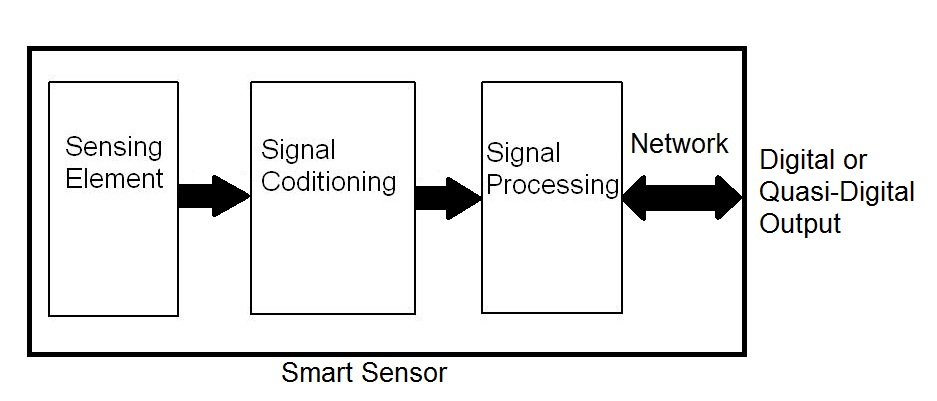
Smart sensor overview

A smart transducer is an analog or digital transducer, actuator, or sensor combined with a processing unit and a communication interface.

As sensors and actuators become more complex, they provide support for various modes of operation and interfacing. Some applications require additionally fault-tolerant and distributed computing. Such functionality can be achieved by adding an embedded microcontroller to the classical sensor/actuator, which increases the ability to cope with complexity at a fair price. Typically, these on-board technologies in smart sensors are used for digital processing, either frequency-to-code or analog-to-digital conversations, interfacing functions and calculations. Interfacing functions include decision-making tools like self-adaption, self-diagnostics, and self-identification functions, but also the ability to control how long and when the sensor will be fully awake, to minimize power consumption and to decide when to dump and store data.

They are often made using CMOS, VLSI technology and may contain MEMS devices leading to lower cost. They may provide full digital outputs for easier interface or they may provide quasi-digital outputs like pulse-width modulation. In the machine vision field, a single compact unit that combines the imaging functions and the complete image processing functions is often called a smart sensor.

Smart sensors are a crucial element in the phenomenon Internet of Things (IoT). Within such a network, multiple physical vehicles and devices are embedded with sensors, software and electronics. Data will be collected and shared for better integration between digital environments and the physical world. The connectivity between sensors is an important requirement for an IoT innovation to perform well. Interoperability can therefore be seen as a consequence of connectivity. The sensors work and complement each other.

== Improvement over traditional sensors ==
The key features of smart sensors as part of the IoT that differentiate them from traditional sensors are:

- Small size
- Self-validation and self-identification
- Low power requirements
- Self-diagnosis
- Self-calibration
- Connection to the Internet and other devices

The traditional sensor collects information about an object or a situation and translates it into an electrical signal. It gives feedback of the physical environment, process, or substance in a measurable way, and signals or indicates when change in this environment occurs. Traditional sensors in a network of sensors can be divided in three parts: one, the sensors; two, a centralized interface where the data is collected and processed; and three, an infrastructure that connects the network, like plugs, sockets and wires.

A network of smart sensors can be divided in two parts; (1) the sensors, and (2) a centralized interface. The fundamental difference with traditional sensors, is that the microprocessors embedded in the smart sensors already process the data. Therefore, less data has to be transmitted and the data can immediately be used and accessed on different devices. The switch to smart sensors entails that the tight coupling between transmission and processing technologies is removed.

=== Digital traces ===
Within a digital environment, actions or activities leave a digital trace. Smart sensors measure these activities in the physical environment and translate this into a digital environment. Therefore, every step within the process becomes digitally traceable. Whenever a mistake is made somewhere in a production process, this can be tracked down using these digital traces. As a result, it will be easier to track down inefficiencies within a production process and simplify process innovations, because one can easier analyze what part of the production process is inefficient. Due to the fact that all the information is digitized, the company is exposed to cyber attacks. To protect itself from these information breaches, ensuring a secure platform is crucial.

=== Layered modular architecture of digital sensors ===
The term layered modular architecture is a combination between the modular architecture of the physical components of a product with the layered architecture of the digital system. There is a contents layer, a service layer, a network layer ((1) logical transmission, (2) physical transport), and a device layer ((1) logical capability, (2) physical machinery). Starting at the device layer, the smart sensor itself is the physical machinery, measuring its physical environment. The logical capacity refers to operating systems, which can be Windows, MacOS or another operating system that is used to run the platform on. At the network layer, the logical transmission can consist of various transmission methods; Wi-Fi, Bluetooth, NFC, Zigbee and RFID. For smart sensors, physical transport is not necessary, since smart sensors are usually wireless. Yet charging wires and sockets are still commonly used. The service layer is about the service that is provided by the smart sensor. The sensors are able to process the data themselves. Therefore, there is not one specific service of the sensors because they process multiple things simultaneously. They can for example signal that certain assets need to be repaired. The content layer would be the centralised platforms, that are created and used to gain insights and create value.

== Usage across industries ==
=== Insurance ===
Traditionally, insurance companies tried to assess the risk of their clients by looking over their application form, trust their answers and then simply cover it with a monthly premium. However, due to asymmetric information, it was difficult to accurately determine risk of a certain client. The introduction of smart sensors in the insurance industry is disrupting the traditional practice in multiple ways. Smart sensors generate a large amount of (big) data and affects the business models of insurance companies as follows.

Smart sensors in client’s homes or in wearables help insurance companies to get much more detailed information. Wearables can for example monitor heart-related metrics, location-based systems like security technologies, or smart thermostats can generate important data of your house. They can use this information to improve risk assessment and risk management, reduce asymmetric information, and ultimately reduce costs.

Additionally, if clients agree upon providing this data of sensors in their homes, they can even get a discount on their premium. This approach of trading information in return for special deals is called bartering and it is one form of data monetization. Data monetization is the act of exchanging information-based products and services for legal tender or something of perceived equivalent value. In other words, data monetization is exploiting opportunities to generate new revenues. Another form of data monetization, which insurers regularly use nowadays, is selling data to third parties.

=== Manufacturing ===
One of the recent trends in manufacturing is the revolution of Industry 4.0, in which data exchanging and automation play a crucial role. Traditionally, machines were already able to automate certain small tasks (e.g. open/close valves). Automation in smart factories go beyond these easy tasks. It increasingly includes complex optimization decisions that humans typically make. For machines to be able to make human decisions, it is imperative to get detailed information, and that’s were smart sensors come in.

For manufacturing, efficiency is one of the most important aspects. Smart sensors pull data from assets to which they are connected and process the data continuously. They can provide detailed real-time information about the plant and process and reveal performance issues. If this is just a small performance issue, the smart factory can even solve the problem itself. Smart sensors can predict defects as well, so rather than fixing a problem afterwards, maintenance workers can prevent it. This all leads to outstanding asset efficiency and reduces downtime, which is the enemy of every production process.

Smart sensors can also be applied beyond the factory. For example sensors on objects like vehicles or shipping containers can give detailed information about delivery status. This affects both manufacturing and the whole supply chain.

=== Automotive ===
The last couple of years, the automotive industry has been challenging their ‘old’ ecosystems. Several new technologies like smart sensors play a crucial role in this process. Nowadays, these sensors only enable some small autonomous features like automatic parking services, obstacle detection and emergency braking, which improves security. Although a lot of companies are focused on technologies that improve cars and work towards automation, complete disruption of the industry has not yet been reached. Yet, experts expect that autonomous cars without any human interference will dominate the roads in 10 years.

Smart sensors generate data of the car and their surroundings, connect them into a car network, and translate this into valuable information which allows the car to see and interpret the world. Basically, the sensor works as follows. It has to pull physical and environmental data, use that information for calculations, analyze the outcomes and translate it into action. Sensors in other cars have to be connected into the car network and communicate with each other.

However, smart sensors in the automotive industry can also be used in a more sustaining way. Car manufacturers place smart sensors in different parts of the car, which collects and shares information. Drivers and manufacturers can use this information to transform from scheduled to predictive maintenance. Established firms have a strong focus on these sustaining innovations, but the risk is that they do not see new entrants coming and have difficulties to adapt. Therefore, making a distinction between a disruptive and sustaining innovation is important and brings different implications to managers.

== See also ==
- Ambient intelligence
- Edge computing
- IEEE 1451
- Internet of things
- Intelligent sensor
- Machine to machine
- Sentroller
- SensorML
- System on a chip
- Transducer electronic data sheet
- TransducerML
