= IEEE 1451 =

IEEE standard for smart transducer interfaces

IEEE 1451 is a set of smart transducer interface standards developed by the Institute of Electrical and Electronics Engineers (IEEE) Instrumentation and Measurement Society's Sensor Technology Technical Committee describing a set of open, but paywalled, common, network-independent communication interfaces for connecting transducers (sensors or actuators) to microprocessors, instrumentation systems, and control/field networks. One of the key elements of these standards is the definition of Transducer electronic data sheets (TEDS) for each transducer. The TEDS is a memory device attached to the transducer, which stores transducer identification, calibration, correction data, and manufacturer-related information. The goal of the IEEE 1451 family of standards is to allow the access of transducer data through a common set of interfaces whether the transducers are connected to systems or networks via a wired or wireless means.

== Transducer electronic data sheet ==
A transducer electronic data sheet (TEDS) is a standardized method of storing transducer (sensors or actuators) identification, calibration, correction data, and manufacturer-related information. TEDS formats are defined in the IEEE 1451 set of smart transducer interface standards developed by the IEEE Instrumentation and Measurement Society's Sensor Technology Technical Committee that describe a set of open, common, network-independent communication interfaces for connecting transducers to microprocessors, instrumentation systems, and control/field networks.

One of the key elements of the IEEE 1451 standards is the definition of TEDS for each transducer. The TEDS can be implemented as a memory device attached to the transducer and containing information needed by a measurement instrument or control system to interface with a transducer. TEDS can, however, be implemented in two ways. First, the TEDS can reside in embedded memory, typically an EEPROM, within the transducer itself which is connected to the measurement instrument or control system. Second, a virtual TEDS can exist as a data file accessible by the measurement instrument or control system. A virtual TEDS extends the standardized TEDS to legacy sensors and applications where embedded memory may not be available.

== 1451 family of standards ==
The 1451 family of standards includes:

- 1451.0–2007 IEEE Standard for a Smart Transducer Interface for Sensors and Actuators – Common Functions, Communication Protocols, and Transducer Electronic Data Sheet (TEDS) Formats
- 1451.1–1999 IEEE Standard for a Smart Transducer Interface for Sensors and Actuators – Network Capable Application Processor Information Model
- 1451.2-1997 IEEE Standard for a Smart Transducer Interface for Sensors and Actuators – Transducer to Microprocessor Communication Protocols & TEDS Formats
- 1451.3-2003 IEEE Standard for a Smart Transducer Interface for Sensors and Actuators – Digital Communication & TEDS Formats for Distributed Multidrop Systems
- 1451.4-2004 IEEE Standard for a Smart Transducer Interface for Sensors and Actuators – Mixed-Mode Communication Protocols & TEDS Formats
- 1451.5-2007 IEEE Standard for a Smart Transducer Interface for Sensors and Actuators – Wireless Communication Protocols & Transducer Electronic Data Sheet (TEDS) Formats
- 1451.7-2010 IEEE Standard for a Smart Transducer Interface for Sensors and Actuators – Transducers to Radio Frequency Identification (RFID) Systems Communication Protocols and Transducer Electronic Data Sheet Formats

== See also ==
- Bluetooth
- CANopen
- Computer network
- Data sheet
- IEEE 802.15
- IEEE 802.11, standards for Wi-Fi branded products
- Near Field Communication
- Personal area network
- SensorML
- Serial presence detect
- Smart transducer
- TransducerML
- Wireless USB
- Zigbee – low power lightweight wireless protocol in the ISM band
