= Intelligent sensor =

Sensor that takes some predefined action when it senses the appropriate input

An intelligent sensor is a sensor that takes some predefined action when it senses the appropriate input (light, heat, sound, motion, touch, etc.).

== Description ==
The sensor has to do the following tasks:

- Give a digital signal.
- Be able to communicate the signal.
- Be able to execute logical functions and instructions.

== Elements of intelligent sensors ==
An intelligent sensor integrates both analogue and digital subsystems, combining sensing, signal conditioning, conversion, compensation, and communication functions in one unit. Each element contributes to transforming a physical quantity into reliable digital information suitable for higher-level processing.

The main components are:

- Primary sensing element – the core transducer that converts a physical quantity (such as temperature, pressure or acceleration) into an electrical signal.
- Excitation control – provides the necessary stimulus or bias to the sensing element and can vary depending on the sensing principle and application.
- Amplification – increases the weak signal from the sensing element.
- Analogue filtering – removes unwanted noise and prevents aliasing before the signal is converted to digital form.
- Data conversion – converts the conditioned analogue signal into digital form.
- Compensation – corrects variations in sensor behaviour.
- Digital information processing – compresses, validates and interprets data, checking the integrity and consistency of measurements before transmission.
- Digital communication processing – handles addressing, protocol management and error checking during data exchange with external systems.

== Technical capacities ==
Because the tasks are performed by microprocessors, any gadget which mixes a sensor and a microprocessor is usually called an intelligent sensor.

To qualify as an intelligent sensor, the sensor and processor must be part of the same physical unit. A sensor whose only function is to detect and send an unprocessed signal to an external system which performs some action is not considered intelligent.

== Ubiquitous Sensor Networks (USN) ==
Ubiquitous Sensor Networks (USN) is used to describe a network of intelligent sensors that could, one day, become ubiquitous.

== See also ==
- Real-time locating system
- Smart transducer
- Internet of things
