= Alessandra Flammini =

Italian electrical engineer

Alessandra Flammini (born 1960) is an Italian electrical engineer and metrologist whose research involves measurement in challenging environments, including smart sensors, wireless sensor networks, smart buildings, smart grids, and industrial applications. She is Professor of Electronic Measurements in the Department of Information Engineering of the University of Brescia, and leader of the university's Research Group on Embedded Systems and Smart Sensors. Flammini was elected a Fellow of the IEEE in 2024 for contributions to wireless distributed measurements for industrial systems.

== Education and career ==
Flammini was born in Brescia in 1960, and earned a laurea (roughly equivalent to a master's degree) at the Sapienza University of Rome in 1985. After working for ten years in industry, and seven years as a researcher at the University of Brescia, she became an associate professor at the University of Brescia in 2002. She has been full professor there since 2016. In 2022 Flammini was selected as the only Italian woman in engineering to be represented in the database "100 donne contro gli stereotipi per la Scienza" (100 women against stereotypes for Science). She is the research coordinator of the Italian Association of Electrical and Electronic Measurements (GMEE). Flammini is on the editorial board of the Italian magazine Automazione Oggi, and a member of the SPS-Italy scientific committee.

== Recognition ==
Flammini was named an IEEE Fellow, in the 2024 class of fellows, "for contributions to wireless distributed measurements for industrial systems".
