= Irrigation informatics =

Irrigation informatics is a newly emerging academic field that is a cross-disciplinary science using informatics to study the information flows and data management related to irrigation. The field is one of many new informatics sub-specialities that uses the science of information, the practice of information processing, and the engineering of information systems to advance a biophysical science or engineering field.

== Background ==
Agricultural productivity increases are eagerly sought by governments and industry, spurred by the realisation that world food production must double in the 21st century to feed growing populations and that as irrigation makes up 36% of global food production, but that new land for irrigation growth is very limited, irrigation efficiency must increase. Since irrigation science is a mature and stable field, irrigation researchers are looking to cross-disciplinary science to bring about production gains and informatics is one such science along with others such as social science. Much of the driver for work in the area of irrigation informatics is the perceived success of other informatics fields such as health informatics.

== Current research ==
Irrigation informatics is very much a part of the wider research into irrigation wherever information technology or data systems are used, however the term informatics is not always used to describe research involving computer systems and data management so that information science or information technology may alternatively be used. This leads to a great number of irrigation informatics articles not using the term irrigation informatics. There are currently no formal publications (journals) that focus on irrigation informatics with the publication most likely to present articles on the topic being Computers and electronics in Agriculture or one of the many irrigation science journals such as Irrigation Science.

Recent work in the general area of irrigation informatics has mentioned the exact phrase "Irrigation Informatics" with at least one publication in scientific conference proceedings using it in its title.

== Current implementations ==
Meteorological informatics, as with all informatics, are increasingly being used to handle the growing volumes of data that are available from sensors, remote sensing and scientific models. The Australian Bureau of Meteorology has recently implemented an XML data format, known as the Water Data Transfer Format (WDTF) and standard to be used by Australian government agencies and meteorological data suppliers when delivering data to the Bureau. This format includes specifications for evapotranspiration and other weather parameters that are useful for irrigation and may be used through implementations of irrigation informatics.

== See also ==
- Environmental informatics
