= Water Data Transfer Format =

Water Data Transfer Format (WDTF)
- Developed by: Australian Bureau of Meteorology and CSIRO
- Latest release: 1.2; December 13, 2013; 11 years ago
- Type of format: Irrigation Informatics
- Extended from: XML

Water Data Transfer Format (WDTF) is a data delivery standard implemented by the Australian Bureau of Meteorology (BoM) that was jointly developed with the CSIRO. The standard, released in 2009, specifies both the format of and the techniques used to deliver Australian water data measurements to the BoM.

The Water Act 2007 (Cth) requires some private organisations and government agencies in Australia that collect water data and to deliver it to the BoM according to the WDTF standard.

An external meteorological data source that delivers data in WDTF-compliant forms is the CSIRO Land & Water's Automatic Weatherstation Network. Data from this weather station network can be viewed in a web browser, downloaded at text values in CSV format, downloaded in a condensed XML format for machine-to-machine communications, or downloaded as WDTF-compliant data.

The use of WDTF is an example of work in the field of irrigation informatics.

== See also ==
- WaterML
