= Sentroller =

A sentroller, used in the Internet of things is a sensor, controller or actuator or combination of these three.

== Sentrollers in the Internet of things ==
The current Internet is an Internet of people, based on people communicating with people, using smartphones, tablets, laptops and computers, but this is changing: equipment and devices connected to the Internet (e.g. set-top boxes, cameras, cars) are starting to shift the balance away from people towards things. The future is clearly moving into a direction where the number of things connected to the Internet will overwhelm the number of connected people. Predictions range up to a factor of 100 to 1 or more, and thus the Internet of people will transform into the Internet of things. Thereby, the Internet of things will connect to and communicate directly with other "things", rather than directly with people.

Many of the new things connected to the Internet will be sentrollers, which means they are either actuators, sensors, controllers, or combinations of these three things. One simple example is a home thermostat. A thermostat is a sentroller as it senses the temperature in the home, checks whether the home or room in which the thermostat is monitoring temperature is at the desired temperature, and if not, turns on the heater or the air conditioner. Therefore, a thermostat is a sensor and a controller – a sentroller. No human interaction with the thermostat or the cloud will be necessary for the thermostat to keep the heat in the home at the right level.

In practice, sentrollers absorb and/or produce very limited amounts of information, but connectivity to the internet is essential for their operation. The Internet of things will host the applications that know how to interpret the information provided by sentrollers and what action to be taken. The smarts of the smart home, smart energy, smart buildings, etc. actually reside in the cloud. The sentrollers are the end nodes that will become the majority population of this type of Internet of things.

== See also ==
- Smart transducer
