= SensorUp =

Canadian software company

- Type: Private
- Founder: Steve Liang
- Headquarters: Calgary
- Services: Methane Emissions Management SaaS; Multi-sensor methane data collection and analysis for oil and gas
- Website: sensorup.com

SensorUp Inc. is a Canadian company based in Calgary, Alberta, Canada, specializing in methane emissions management software. It has done advancements in the oil and gas sector with its methane emissions management SaaS platform, SensorUp GEMS, and for developing the Open Geospatial Consortium SensorThings API standard specification.

== SensorUp GEMS ==
SensorUp GEMS, designed for the oil and gas industry. This SaaS platform integrates with direct measurement and detection technology, including OGI, flyovers, ERP, and SCADA systems. Compliant with the GHG Protocol, SensorUp GEMS contributes to methane intensity assessment and operational efficiency. The platform supports regulatory reporting and MRV processes, aligning with decarbonization, carbon-neutral, and net-zero targets. SensorUp GEMS aligns with OGMP 2.0, GTI Veritas, and MiQ standards.

== History ==
In 2014, SensorUp received funding supports from Natural Resources Canada's GeoConnections and TecTerra. In 2016, as part of the OGC Internet of Things pilot project SensorUp demonstrated its interoperable OGC SensorThings API platform solution at the Department of Homeland Security. Dr. Reginald Brothers, the Undersecretary of the Homeland Security Science and Technology, was "impressed with the ‘state of the practical’ where these various industry sensors can be integrated today using open standards that remove the stovepipe limitations of one-off technologies." In March 2016 SensorUp submitted a new open source software project proposal, titled Whiskers, to the Eclipse Foundation. Whiskers was intended to be an OGC SensorThings API framework consisting of a JavaScript client and a light-weight server for IoT gateways. The project was Terminated and Archived in 2019.

In January 2017, with the support of Natural Resources Canada, SensorUp launched the Smart City Starter Kit.

In July 2017, SensorUp launched the CloudUAV platform, allowing UAV researchers and users to manage their UAV workflow with an online portal and a smartphone application, based on the OGC SensorThings API.

In May 2018, SensorUp won the NATO Defence Innovation Challenge Award for secured federation of IoT devices.

In June 2018, SensorUp announced that it had raised $2 million in seed financing, led by Vanedge Capital.

In December 2018, SensorUp provided the OGC SensorThings API for a Department of Homeland Security Next Generation First Responder initiative's operational experimentation in Houston, Texas. SensorUp's SensorThings facilitated sensor integration and data provisioning for situational awareness and the common operating picture.

In late 2022, SensorUp introduced the Gas Emissions Management Solution (GEMS), a SaaS platform for methane emissions management. The GEMS platform integrates various data sources, including methane emission sensor data from most 3rd parties, Optical Gas Imaging (OGI) inspection data, and operational data from SCADA and ERP systems, to assist with methane leak detection and repair (LDAR). Occidental Petroleum announced it was using GEMS to help meet their net-zero targets.

In July 2023, SensorUp announced a CAD $12 million Series B funding round led by Climate Investment (OGCI). In the same month, Terry Cunningham was appointed as the new CEO of SensorUp. Cunningham's appointment coincides with SensorUp's focus on the methane emissions management landscape. Dr. Steve Liang, Founder, continues in the CTO role.
