= Datasheets.com =

DataSheets.com

- Website type: Datasheet and electronic component search engine
- Available in: English and Chinese
- Headquarters: Cambridge, MA, United States
- Owner: AspenCore Inc
- Industry: Electronics, Electronic media
- Website: Official website
- Commercial: Yes
- Registration: Optional
- Launched: July 15, 2011
- Current status: Active

DataSheets.com is a searchable database of electronic component data sheets and purchasing information. The website is intended for Design engineers and Electronics purchasing agents. DataSheets.com was developed by UBM in conjunction with SiliconExpert Technologies.

== See also ==
- data sheet
- Electronic component
- Electronics
