= Thesaurus Musicarum Latinarum =

The Thesaurus Musicarum Latinarum (TML) is an evolving digital database of Latin music theory spanning from the 3rd to the 17th century. It serves as a comprehensive searchable archive for musicologists, historians, and theorists, providing access to the full text of treatises that defined Western musical thought.

== Overview and History ==
Established in 1990 by Thomas J. Mathiesen, the TML was developed to address the difficulty of accessing widely dispersed manuscripts and rare printed editions of Latin music theory. It is hosted and maintained by the Center for the History of Music Theory and Literature (CHMTL) at Indiana University Bloomington, within the Jacobs School of Music. Around 2013, Giuliano Di Bacco took over the direction of the CHMTL.

The project aimed to digitize every known treatise on music written in Latin, from the early writings of Augustine and Boethius to the complex polyphonic treatises of the 16th and 17h centuries. The core collection was composed of texts gathered by Martin Gerbert and then Edmond de Coussemaker in their Scriptores, to which more recent collections were gradually added, notably the Corpus Scriptorum de Musica (CSM) published by the American Institute of Musicology. It contained 725 files at the turn of the 21st century and 939 by 2025. Over time, it was joined by sister corpora—though much smaller in scale—consisting of theoretical writings in French (TFM), Italian (SMI), and English (TME). The collection has seen little to no growth since 2017.

== Technical Infrastructure and Availability ==
The TML has historically been a pioneer. Originally a simple collection of plain text files distributed via CD-ROM, it was very early on migrated to the Internet, notably on LISTSERV (e-mail) and FTP servers, as well as the then-fledgling World Wide Web, in the form of a static website paired with a search engine developed by the CNIDR.

While an improved version of the TML was announced for the summer of 2013, the infrastructure, which had become obsolete, survived until December 2015, when a cyberattack caused the site to go offline for over a month. A development version was then made available on another server, and it was not until mid-2017 that a stable and modernized version of the TML was launched, featuring web page styling and a new search engine, likely running on PHP and MySQL.

While this long period of disruption had already raised doubts about the TML's long-term viability, these were brutally confirmed in the spring of 2025 when the TML suddenly vanished from the web, replaced for many months by a 404 error. As of December 2025, the site remains "missing in action."

== Copyright and licensing ==
During its initial period (up until 2015), the TML displayed a rather restrictive copyright notice. TML data were made available to scholars for non-commercial, educational, and scientific use, based on the principle of "fair use." However, the editors asserted exclusive rights over the compilation (the gathering of the treatises used), the encoding system, and all texts and graphics produced by the TML team from public domain material or manuscripts. When texts from recent editions were added to the thesaurus, they bore the mention "Reproduced with permission."

Starting with the modernized 2017 version, the TML states: "Except where otherwise noted, this website is subject to a Creative Commons Attribution 4.0 International License." This means that, provided the specific conditions of this license are met—notably giving appropriate credit and indicating if changes were made—anyone is free to share and adapt the material for any purpose, including commercial use. The TML has thus waived any exclusive rights to the compilation, the encoding, and the files created by its team from public domain material. Only the potential rights of third parties regarding files marked "Reproduced with permission" remain reserved.

== Petition to restore the TML and action by the Fenyx group ==
In November 2025, an online petition for the restoration of the TML was launched. Highlighting the resource's significance to the global research community, it called upon those in charge to publish a roadmap for the reinstatement of the TML and its sister thesauri. The petition gathered signatures from nearly 250 international scholars and was delivered to its recipients on December 12, 2025. Almost immediately, the generic 404 error that had replaced the TML website was substituted by an apology from the CHMTL. This message justified the exceptionally long outage by citing a cyberattack that had affected the entire University, and promised that the TML would be restored as soon as the application was adapted to the new server configuration.

On December 13, 2025, an anonymous collective of medievalists claimed responsibility for launching a fully functional alternative to the TML, under a Creative Commons 4.0 license. According to the Fenyx group, all data were successfully retrieved from web archives, and a new application framework was built in a very short timeframe. These academic hacktivists also provide a compressed archive containing all TML treatises converted into TEI format, encouraging their download and widest possible distribution. Finally, relying on European case law which does not grant exclusive rights to the raw transcription of public domain works, they declared the "Reproduced with permission" notice—as it still appears on several TML files—to be void, stating that contracts between the TML and academic publishers are unenforceable against third parties. Consequently, they systematically removed these notices while continuing to credit the publishers involved.
