= Semantic Sensor Web =

The Semantic Sensor Web (SSW) is a marriage of sensor web and semantic Web technologies. The encoding of sensor descriptions and sensor observation data with Semantic Web languages enables more expressive representation, advanced access, and formal analysis of sensor resources. The SSW annotates sensor data with spatial, temporal, and thematic semantic metadata. This technique builds on current standardization efforts within the Open Geospatial Consortium's Sensor Web Enablement (SWE) and extends them with Semantic Web technologies to provide enhanced descriptions and access to sensor data.

== Semantic modeling and annotation of sensor data ==
Ontologies and other semantic technologies can be key enabling technologies for sensor networks because they will improve semantic interoperability and integration, as well as facilitate reasoning, classification and other types of assurance and automation not included in the Open Geospatial Consortium (OGC) standards. A semantic sensor network will allow the network, its sensors and the resulting data to be organised, installed and managed, queried, understood and controlled through high-level specifications. Ontologies for sensors provide a framework for describing sensors. These ontologies allow classification and reasoning on the capabilities and measurements of sensors, provenance of measurements and may allow reasoning about individual sensors as well as reasoning about the connection of a number of sensors as a macroinstrument. The sensor ontologies, to some degree, reflect the OGC standards and, given ontologies that can encode sensor descriptions, understanding how to map between the ontologies and OGC models is an important consideration. Semantic annotation of sensor descriptions and services that support sensor data exchange and sensor network management will serve a similar purpose as that espoused by semantic annotation of Web services. This research is conducted through the W3C Semantic Sensor Network Incubator Group (SSN-XG) activity.

== W3C Semantic Sensor Networks ==
The World Wide Web Consortium (W3C) initiated the Semantic Sensor Networks Incubator Group (SSN-XG) to develop the Semantic Sensor Network (SSN) ontology, intended to model sensor devices, systems, processes, and observations. The Incubator Group later transitioned into the Semantic Sensor Networks Community Group. It was then picked up in the joint OGC and W3C Spatial Data on the Web Working Group and published as a W3C Recommendation.

The Semantic Sensor Network (SSN) ontology enables expressive representation of sensor observations, sampling, and actuation. The SSN ontology is encoded in the Web Ontology Language (OWL2). A number of projects have used it for improved management of sensor data on the Web, involving annotation, integration, publishing, and search.

== Context ==
Sensors around the globe currently collect avalanches of data about the world. The rapid development and deployment of sensor technology is intensifying the existing problem of too much data and not enough knowledge. With a view to alleviating this glut, sensor data can be annotated with semantic metadata to increase interoperability between heterogeneous sensor networks, as well as to provide contextual information essential for situation awareness. Semantic web techniques can greatly help with the problem of data integration and discovery as it helps map between different metadata schema in a structured way.

== Uses ==
Semantic Sensor Web (SSW) technologies are utilized in fields such as agriculture, disaster management, building management and laboratory management.

=== Agriculture ===
Monitoring various environmental attributes is critical to the growth of plants. Environmental attributes that are critical for growers are mainly temperature, moisture, pH, electric conductivity (EC), and more. Real-time monitoring in addition to setting alerts for the mentioned sensors was never possible. With the creation of SSW, growers can now track their plant growing conditions in real-time.

An example of such advancement in agriculture through utilization of SSW is the research conducted in 2008 on Australian farms where temperature, humidity, barometric pressure, wind speed, wind direction and rainfall were monitored using SSW methodology. The architecture of this research project consists of personal integration needs, Semantic web, and more in addition to semantic data integration, i.e. where data is centralized to make sensor semantic web technologies meaningful and useful.

=== Building management (smart buildings) ===
Managing buildings can be quite sophisticated, as the cost of fixing damages is significantly higher than having proper monitoring tools in place to prevent damages from happening. SSW allows for getting notified of water leaks, controlling apartment temperature via smartphone, and more.

=== Laboratory management ===
Managing laboratory tests can be quite challenging, especially if tests take place over a long time, across multiple locations, or in infrastructures where many tests occur. Such tests include creep tests for a material, reaction tests of a certain chemical or wireless transmission tests of a circuit. Advancements in SSW allow for real-time monitoring of laboratory variables via sensors. Such sensors can take more than one factor into consideration before alerting. For example, an alert can go off when pressure and temperature both exceed a certain limit, or an alert can go off when pressure in one building drops, yet pressure in another building remains the same.

== Notable contributions ==
Standardization is a lengthy and difficult process, as players in a field that have existing solutions would see any standardization as an additional cost to their activities. Open Geospatial Consortium (OGC), an international voluntary consensus standards organization that was founded in 1994, is making efforts to enhance and accelerate the growth of the SSW community and standardize sensor information across web. Most OGC standards depend on generalized architecture that is collectively captured in set of documents. The goal of OGC is to provide enhancements in description and meaning of sensor data. Also, OGC had enabled Sensor Web communication. OGC is in charge of creating open geospatial standards. Moreover, OCG is supported by industry, government, and academic partners to allow for easy creation of geo-processing technologies known as “plug and play”.

== Current challenges ==
Current challenges in the SSW field include a lack of standardization, which slows down the growth rate of sensors created to measure things. For the semantic sensor web to be meaningful, the languages, tags, and labels across various applications, developed by various developers, must be the same. Unfortunately, due to scattered development of various architectures, such standardization is not possible. This problem is called vastness.

There is also the problem of inconsistency, such that when changing the architecture of an existing solution, the system logic will no longer hold. In order to resolve this problem, there is a need for an extensive amount of resources (depending on the size and complexity of system). For example, many existing systems use twelve bits to transfer temperature data to a local computer. However, in a SSW 16 bits of data is acceptable. This inconsistency results in higher data traffic with no additional accuracy improvement. In order for the old system to improve, there is a need of allocating extra bits and changing the buffer requirements, which is costly. Assuming the resources required to make the tag requirement are available, there is still the existence of unnecessary data that requires additional storage space in addition to creating confusion for other SSW members. The only solution remaining is changing the hardware requirements, which requires a lot of resources.

== See also ==
- Sensor Web
- Sensor Grid
