= CAN in Automation =

Organization

CAN in Automation (CiA)391 is the international users' and manufacturers' organization that develops and supports CAN-based higher-layer protocols. About 650 (2018) companies from all over the world have joined the non-profit organization. CAN specifications are developed within CiA interest groups (IG) in cooperation with employees of the member companies.

The following IGs have been established: IG CANopen, IG CANopen FD, IG profiles, IG layer 1/2, IG safety/security, IG J1939.

The interest groups manage their related special interest groups (SIG). These special interest groups (SIG) develop for example dedicated CiA specifications and recommendations (e.g. device and applications profiles for CANopen and CANopen FD).

CiA representatives support many international standardization activities (ISO, IEC, CEN, Cenelec, and SAE), dealing with CAN. Moreover, CiA publishes the technical magazine CAN Newsletter (downloadable PDF-file) as well as the CAN Newsletter Online.
