= TransducerML =

TransducerML (Transducer Markup Language) or TML is a retired Open Geospatial Consortium standard developed to describe any transducer (sensor or transmitter) in terms of a common model, including characterizing not only the data but XML formed metadata describing the system producing that data.

== Process ==
TML captures when and where a sensor measurement or transmitter actuation occurs. Its system description describes not only individual data sources but also systems of components, including the specific types of components, the logical and physical relationships between the components, and the data produced or consumed by each of the components. Information captured includes manufacturer information, model numbers of specific items, serial numbers, how two devices may relate to each other both logically and physically (for example, a GPS system may provide location information for a camera and the GPS antenna may be located a certain distance away from the camera center), and the type of data being produced from those particular devices. Time stamps for each data measurement and other identifying information is also captured, making the TML system description particularly well suited for carrying data required for automated system discovery and to support data retrieval.

Metadata relating to archiving, indexing and cataloguing is an integral part of TML, since a TML data stream is designed to be self-contained and self-sufficient. Any information about the system, as well as information required to later parse and process the data, is captured in the TML system description. In addition to information about the system that produced the data, precise information about the data itself is captured. Data types, data sizes, ordering and arrangement, calibration information, units of measurement, precise time-tagging of individual groups of data, information about uncertainty, coordinate reference frames (where applicable) and physical phenomena relating to the data are among the details which are captured and retained. The TML system description therefore automatically tags all fields, which can later be stored in a registry for discovery.

TML system description fields include descriptions of the physical system, the data system and the data product. The data itself forms the other component of a TML data stream. The physical system description includes information such as model and serial number information about specific transducers and components of a system, system calibration information, system capabilities, installation information, owners and operators, and other information directly applicable to searches related to general data exchange independent of operating conditions. The data system description contains information about the specific transducers and components such as their behavior, responses to physical phenomena, sensitivity, and other operating parameters. The data product description addresses the specific data stream, such as data types, layouts, encoding, and other information necessary for the consumer of a TML data stream to interpret the stream.

== Uses ==
Using TML metadata enables a common metadata archive to be developed, which then permits discovery, search and retrieval based on a common technique. Regardless of the source of the data and its native complexity, metadata about the data generation system is readily at hand, and can be searched to discover specific systems of interest based on a number of criteria

A key benefit to TML is that it enables correlation of measurements temporally by using a high-resolution clock tied to each individual data source, and models logical and physical relationships between multiple transducers in a system. Data from all elements of a system are integrated into a real-time data stream to substantially reduce the time required for processing and representation of that data, whether it pertains to metadata or to the primary data itself.

Another key benefit to TML is that by bringing both data and metadata from multiple time-varying sources of data into a single stream in a common format, data and metadata archiving, retrieval, analysis and processing can be more easily performed across disparate hardware and software systems. The time tagging of both the data and metadata allows precise determination of the state of a system, and therefore whether its data is of interest, regardless of whether that system remains static or has elements removed, replaced or added. This permits searching for data at a finer granularity than previously possible, while still supporting higher-level data discovery if a user so desires, since the use of individual fields within a TML system description is optional.

TML can process data from simple stationary in-situ transducers to high bandwidth dynamic remote devices such as a synthetic aperture radar system.

== See also ==
- Transducer electronic data sheet
- IEEE 1451
- Observations and Measurements
