= Observations and Measurements =

Observations and Measurements (O&M) is an international standard which defines a conceptual schema encoding for observations, and for features involved in sampling when making observations. While the O&M standard was developed in the context of geographic information systems, the model is derived from generic patterns proposed by Fowler and Odell, and is not limited to geospatial information. O&M is one of the core standards in the OGC Sensor Web Enablement suite, providing the response model for Sensor Observation Service (SOS).

== Observation schema ==
The core of the standard provides the observation schema. An observation is an act that results in the estimation of the value of a feature property, and involves application of a specified procedure, such as a sensor, instrument, algorithm or process chain. The procedure may be applied in situ, remotely, or ex situ with respect to the sampling location. Use of a common model for observation metadata allows data to be combined unambiguously, across discipline boundaries. Observation details are also important for data discovery and for data quality estimation. An observation is defined in terms of the set of properties that support these applications.

O&M defines a core set of properties for an observation:

- feature of interest
- observed property
- result
- procedure – the instrument, algorithm or process used (which may be described using SensorML)
- phenomenon time – the real-world time associated with the result
- result time – the time when the result was generated
- valid time – the period during which the result may be used

The key to the model is the division of the observation and its feature of interest, separating the concerns so that the appropriate information associated with the description of each object. This allows a unified treatment of in situ, ex situ, and remote-sensed observations. The observation schema may also be understood as a corollary of the General Feature Model from ISO 19101, providing metadata associated with the estimation of the value of a feature property. The Observation model takes a user-centric viewpoint, emphasizing the semantics of the feature-of-interest and its properties. This contrasts with sensor oriented models such as SensorML, which take a process – and thus provider-centric viewpoint.

Many observations are made to detect the variation of some property in the natural environment, expressed as a spatial function or field, also known as a coverage (ISO 19123:2005). The relationship between observations, features and coverages is explained, in the context of ocean observations and modeling, in a report for GEOSS Architecture Implementation Pilot 3.

== Sampling features ==
The standard also provides a schema for Sampling Features. Observations commonly involve sampling of the ultimate feature of interest. Specific sampling features, such as station, specimen, transect, section, are used in many application domains, and common processing and visualization tools are used. The standard defines a common set of sampling feature types classified primarily by spatial dimension, as well as samples for ex situ observations. The schema includes relationships between sampling features (sub-sampling, derived samples).

The core properties of sampling features are:

- sampled feature – which links the sampling artefact with the real-world feature of interest
- related observation
- related sampling feature – linking sampling features into complexes

== Implementations ==
An XML encoding (GML Application Schema) is provided for transfer of data:

- Observation schema (XSD)
- Sampling features (XSD)

A JSON encoding is provided for transfer of data:

- JSON Schema

An explicit OWL representation of O&M is available:

- Observation schema (OWL2)
- Sampling features (OWL2).

The W3C Semantic Sensor Network Ontology provides an updated OWL implementation that covers most of O&M .

Version 2.0 of the Observations Data Model ("ODM2"), developed by the Consortium of Universities for the Advancement of Hydrologic Science, Inc. (CUAHSI) and the Critical Zone Observatory project, adapts O&M.

- ODM2 model and software

== Related documents ==
O&M is also published as a topic of the Open Geospatial Consortium Abstract Specification.

The previous version of O&M (Version 1) factored the model into two documents: Part 1 described the Observation Schema, and Part 2 described Sampling Features.

== See also ==
- Observation
- Semantic Sensor Web
- SensorML
