= Anders Paulsson =

Swedish musician (born 1961)

Anders Paulsson (born 14 October 1961) is a Swedish soprano saxophonist.

Since his Carnegie Hall debut in 1992, Anders Paulsson is widely recognized as one of the finest soprano saxophonists in the world. His pioneering musicianship has inspired a succession of over 60 international composers to write solo concertos and chamber music for him and another 20 commissions are scheduled to be premiered in the coming years.

He has recorded 28 CDs and performed concerts in 28 countries in major music halls like Berliner Philharmonie, Alice Tully Hall, Philharmonie Luxembourg, Concertgebouw Amsterdam, Wigmore Hall in London, Palau de la Musica in Valencia, Moscow International Performing Arts Centre and Kitakyushu Performing Arts Centre in Japan with orchestras like the Royal Stockholm Philharmonic, the Swedish Radio Symphony Orchestra, Swedish Radio Choir, Gothenburg Symphony Orchestra Saint Petersburg Philharmonic, Estonian National Symphony Orchestra, Sweden-based organist Andrew Canning, organist Gunnar Idenstam, pianist Magnus Svensson and cellist Svante Henryson..

After classical saxophone studies at the Royal College of Music, Stockholm and with Jean-Marie Londeix in France, he was awarded a ITT International Fellowship Program to study with Joseph Allard and Bob Mintzer at Manhattan School of Music, New York City where he earned a master's degree in jazz performance in 1986. Equally at ease in jazz improvisation he has collaborated with singers ranging from Anne Sofie von Otter to Alice Babs.

As the concert world comes to life after the pandemic, he envisions musical collaborations beyond business as usual, with more creative programming and performance concepts that reach new audiences and have relevance to the most urgent issues of our time – ecological recovery and strengthening democracy.

As a passionate environmentalist he is the co-founder of Coral Guardians www.coralguardians.org, an organization that combines music and science to raise awareness about the world's coral reefs and what is needed to safeguard them for future generations.

To highlight the environmental wisdom of indigenous people, Anders Paulsson composed Coral Symphony for Hawai’i Symphony Orchestra conducted by Grammy Award winning JoAnn Falletta featuring the ancient Hawaiian Creation Epic Kumulipo chanted by Kahu Aaron Mahi as soloist.

At the Nobel festivities in 1993 Anders Paulsson performed for Nelson Mandela when he received the Nobel Peace Prize and he consequently composed a Celebration Suite for Celebrating 20 Years of Democracy in South Africa.

In 2012 Anders Paulsson was awarded the Royal Gold Medal Litteris et Artibus for his prominent artistic achievements as soprano saxophonist.

== Awards ==
- ITT International Fellowship 1984–1986
- Golden Clapperboard for best film music 1994 together with Johan Söderqvist
- Royal Medal Litteris et Artibus 2012
- Fulbright Alumni Award 2019

== Discography ==
- 1988 – In a Sentimental Mood – a Tribute to Duke Ellington (LCM Records)
- 1991 – Anders Paulsson in Concert (LCM Records)
- 1992 – Lindberg – Mitchell – Paulsson (LCM Records)
- 1994 – Spirituals (BIS Records)
- 1995 – Musica Sacra (Opus 3 Records)
- 1996 – Transcendencies (Society of Composers)
- 1997 – Midsummer Night’s Mass (Warner Atrium)
- 1998 – Danjugan Sanctuary (Sittel Records)
- 1999 – 21st Century Swedish Composers (Intim Musik)
- 2001 – A Date with a Soprano Saxophone (Caprice Records)
- 2004 – Hymn to Life (Caprice Records)
- 2006 – Anders Paulsson Live! (iTunes)
- 2007 – Nils Lindberg – Mythological Portraits (Swedish Society Discofil)
- 2008 – Paulsson & Canning play Gershwin (iTunes)
- 2009 – Reflections (Phono Suecia)
- 2012 – Solitude (Footprint Records)
- 2012 – Swedish Soprano Saxophone Concertos (Phono Suecia)
- 2014 – Milonga for 3, Serpent
- 2014 – Danjugan Sanctuary with Frank Ådahl (iTunes)
- 2016 – Jonathan Sheffer - Concerto for Soprano Saxophone & Orchestra (Navona Records)
- 2017 – Kalevi AHO Concerto for Soprano Saxophone (BIS Records)
- 2017 – Guardian Angel, with Pål Svenre (iTunes)
- 2019 – Smooth Talk – Anders Paulsson & Dave Koz (SonoConsult)
- 2019 – Anders Paulsson & Jonathan Dimmock in Concert (SonoConsult)
- 2020 – Heartfelt, The Songs of Wayne Osborne,
- 2020 – The Eyes of All Future Generations Are On Us (SonoConsult)
- 2022 – Anders Eliasson Symphonies 3 & 4 (BIS Records)
