= New Law School building, University of Sydney =

New Law School building of the University of Sydney
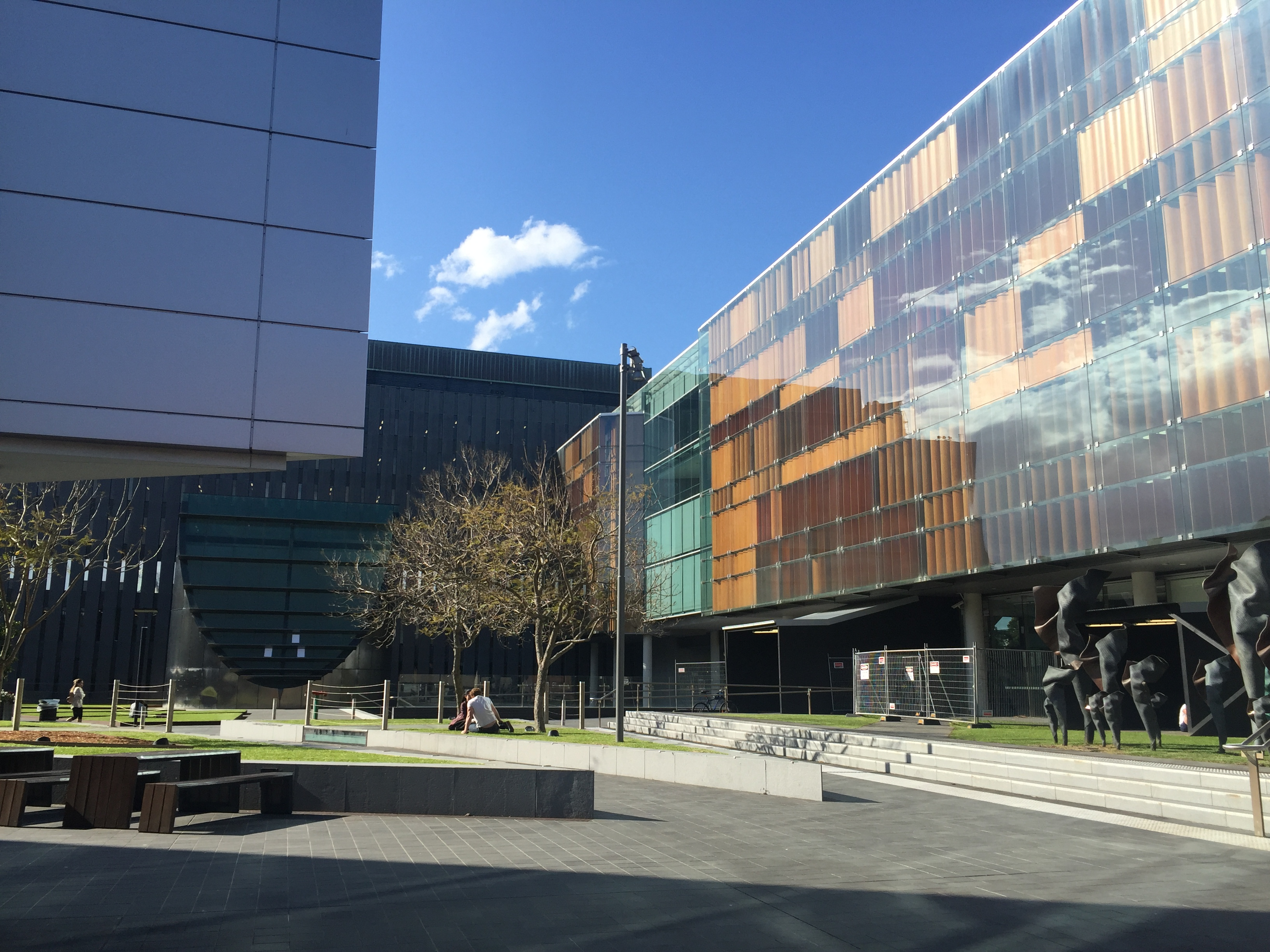
- The New Law School of the University of Sydney, located at the University's Camperdown campus.

General information
- Location: Law School Building (F10) Level 3, Eastern Ave, University of Sydney NSW 2006, Australia
- Completed: 2009
- Opening: 30 April 2009

Design and construction
- Architect: Francis-Jones Morehen Thorp (FJMT)
- Structural engineer: Baulderstone Pty Ltd

Website
- sydney.edu.au/law/

The New Law School building of the University of Sydney is designed by Sydney-based architectural firm Francis-Jones Morehen Thorp (FJMT). The building is located at the university's Camperdown campus in Sydney, New South Wales, Australia and was officially opened on 30 April 2009. It serves as the new building for the Sydney Law School.

== Location ==
As the first university established in Sydney, the University of Sydney was thoughtfully sited on a distinct rise overlooking the Sydney city, metaphorically placing learning and the investigation above the city. However this vision was seemingly lost in the pragmatics of post-war development. When the university decided to relocate the Law School, the Eastern Avenue site opposite the Anderson Stuart building (the Old Medical School) was chosen. As a result, two existing buildings, the Edgeworth David building and Stephen Roberts building, were demolished. The New Law School site sits on the edge of Victoria Park and is close to the university's major historic buildings.

== Competition ==
The university held an international invited design competition in 2003 for the New Law School. All contestants' presentations were public in order to reinforce open learning and research approach. Invited competitors included Axel Schultes Architekten in association with Stanisic Associates; Bligh Voller Nield; Donovan Hill/GHD/Wilson Architects; 3xNielsen; Foster and Partners/Hassell and FJMT.

== Design ==
After winning the design competition in 2003, FJMT was commissioned to take charge of the New Law School's design. The architect aimed to use the project as an opportunity to "redefine and reinterpret the architectural dialectic between city and campus". The design focuses on extending the public domain in order to create a new opening between the university and the community. In particular, the study of law is balanced carefully at this new threshold.

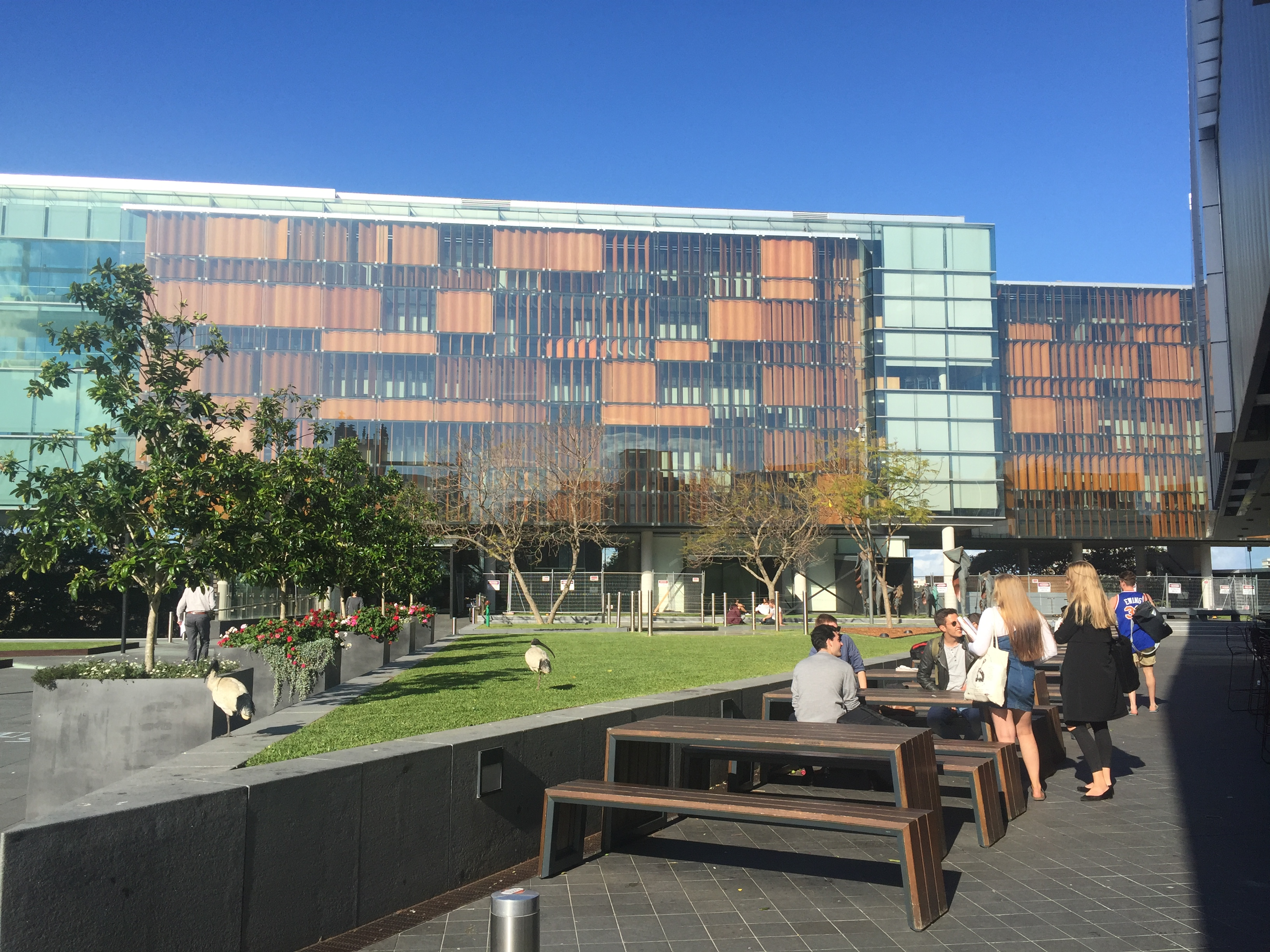
Landscaped public space outside the New Law School

A public area with lawns, terraced landscapes and plazas is created at the level of Eastern Avenue, which is the major artery of the campus. FJMT believes that the public area is an "important contributor to the creation of campus life", therefore enhancing it becomes one of the major design priorities of the New Law School. As a result, movement is expanded out and about the site, as FJMT recognises the social experience of knowledge exchange to be gained through informal interaction of active social participation outside the classroom.

The geometries of a rectangle, a circle and a triangle constitute the tectonic genesis for the New Law School's design, where each form accommodates a set of functions. Split superstructures are suspended above that coalesce to frame new open spaces, and also serve as a new open entrance to the university. The suspended splintered fragments re-establish the topographical positioning of the university on a rise above the city. FJMT's design divided the project into podium and superstructures. Layers of glass and timber louvres that are suspended on sleek stainless steel rods are used in defining the edge and opening of the splintered forms.

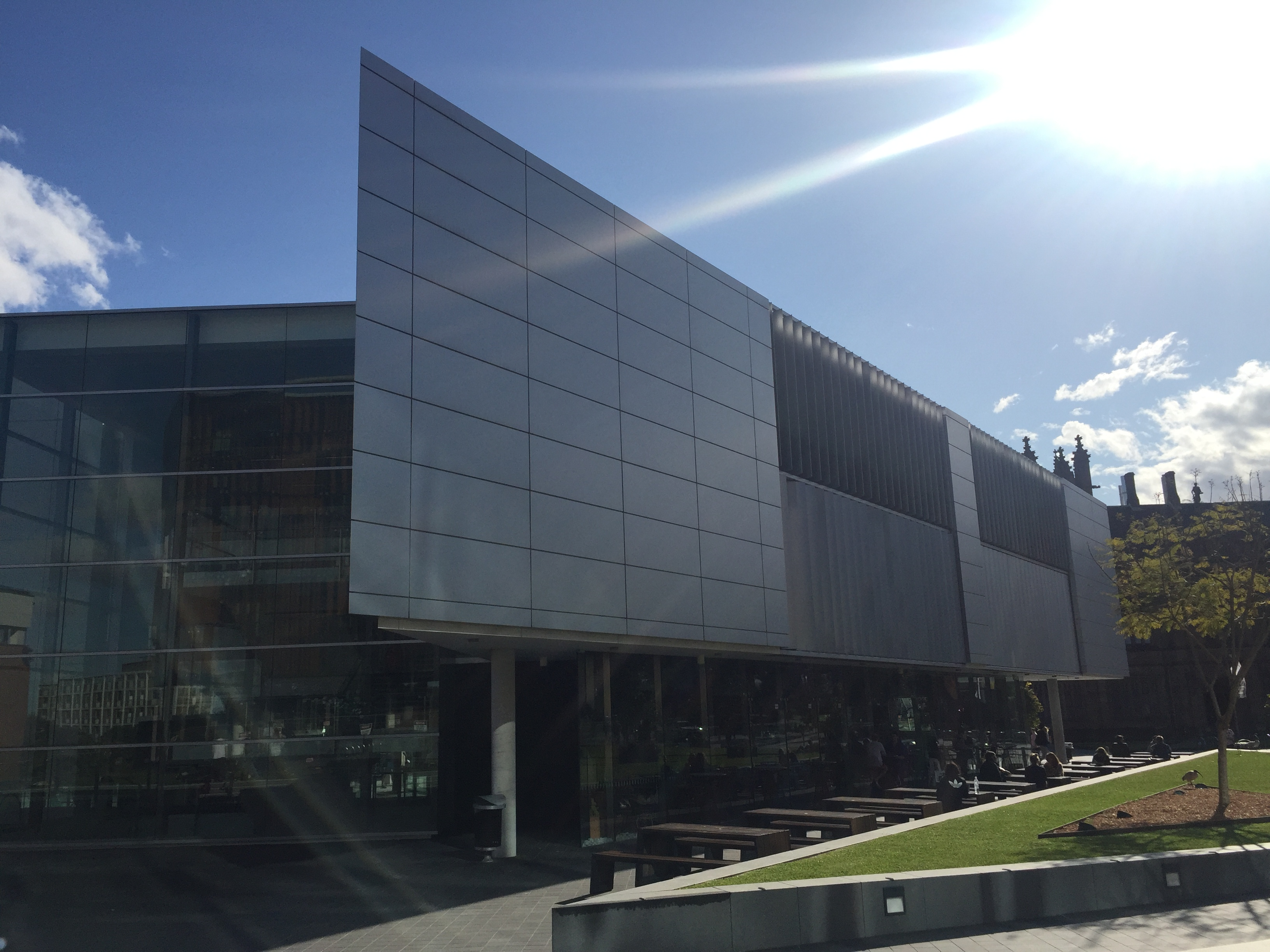
View of the New Law School of the University of Sydney.

A curvilinear "light-tower" made from stainless steel creates a sculptural form that figures against the silent backdrop of the existing Fisher Library. It draws attention to the presence to the new Law Library. According to Principal Johnathan Redman, the light-tower resembles "19th-century circular reading rooms with a lantern above". There is also a glass bridge that connects splintered forms of the New Law School, and serves as a social hub for students and the wider University community. The sense of transparency and openness introduced invites the public to participate in communication and discussion.

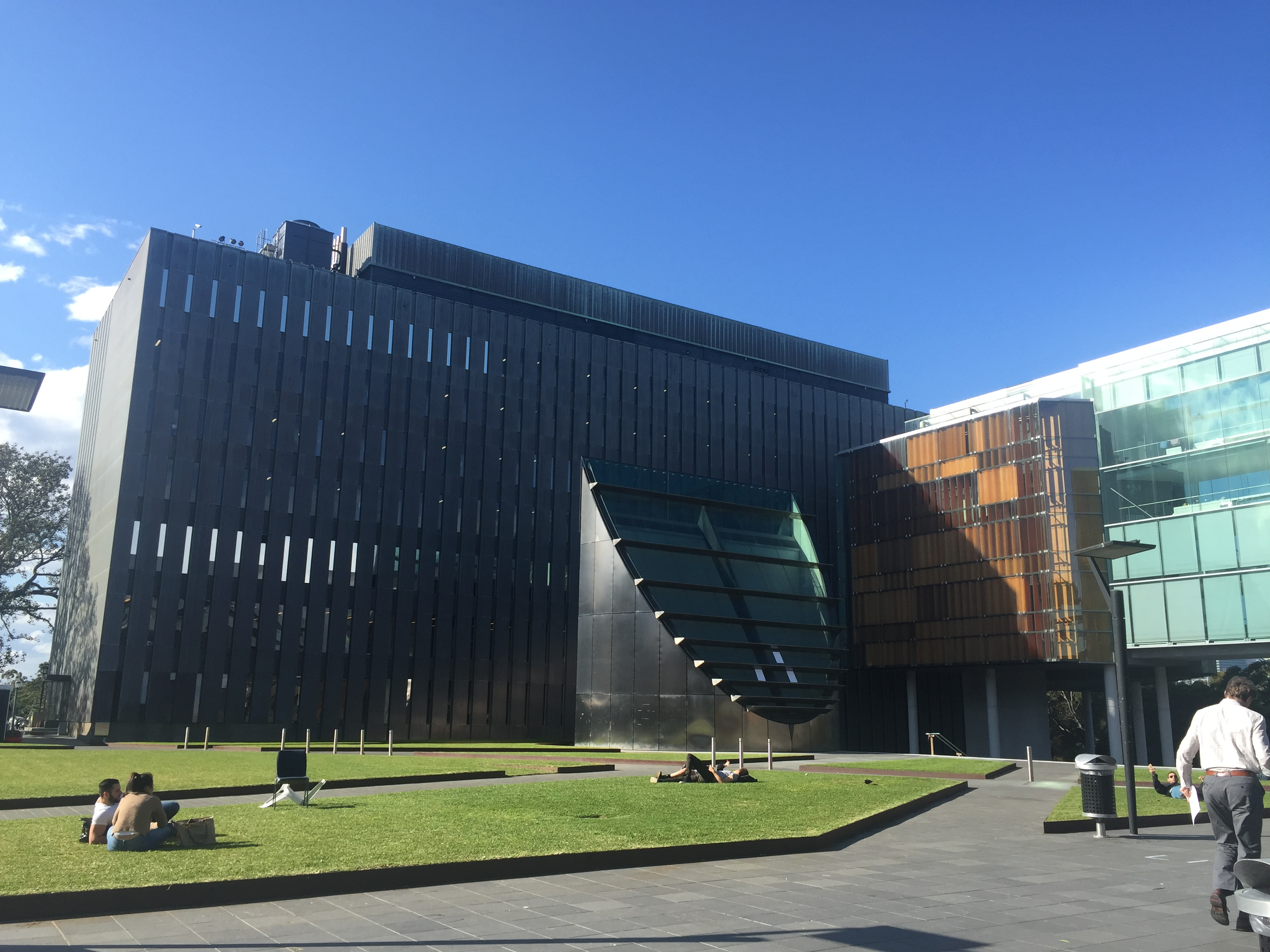
The "light-tower" of the New Law School.

== Environmental performance ==
The New Law School employs a double skin curtain wall, cavity facade system with operable louvers. This system creates a stack effect and regulates the interior thermally. The louvres change according to the position of the sun or preferences of the building's inhabitants. The harsh daylight is therefore softened when it is filtered into the interior space. This system also allows variation in light and shade, blocking harsh glare and heat while preserving and directing views. In addition, natural air circulation is concerned through the interior, tempering the environment as it is needed. On the other hand, the double skin glass serves as an acoustic barrier to noises from the busy City Road, so that inhabitants can engage in quiet activities without disturbance.

To ensure daylight reaches the levels below ground, the podium is punctuated with triple-laminated glass. In addition, the 20-meter-tall light tower, which is directly above the Law Library's main reading room, reflects natural daylight through skylights and clerestories, and also draws out stale air.

== Facilities ==
The building's main 300-seat auditorium is used to hold major public lectures and seminars. Its "in-the-round" configuration, where the lecturer is surrounded by audiences who sit no more than five rows from them, creates an intimate environment which encourages active participation. This configuration is also carried out in the four 100-seat lecture theatres.

Sixteen seminar rooms and other meeting facilities are also designed as teaching spaces that accommodate smaller groups. Their flexible flat-floor design enable multiple configurations to accommodate different learning methodologies, from traditional lectures to group discussions. Dispute resolution facilities including a Moot Court, mediation break-out rooms and judges’ chambers are also provided for students to simulate court proceedings, therefore allowing them to take part in practical experience of the arts of advocacy, persuasion and problem solving. Additionally, there are office spaces and facilities that are dedicated to the student representative body as well as doctrine and masters research students.

== Public recognition ==
The project has received various awards from national institutions, such as the Australian Institute of Building and Australian Institute of Architects.

== Bibliography ==
- Francis-Jones, Richard; Morehen, Jeff; Thorp, Richard (2009). In the realm of learning: the University of Sydney's new law school. Australia: The Images Pub. Group. p. 160. ISBN 978-1-864-70357-3.
- Francis-Jones Morehen Thorp (2015), fjmt studios: Awards, Francis-Jones Morehen Thorp
- Sokol (2010), Turned Inside-Out: To daylight its new Faculty of Law building, the University of Sydney presumed a central atrium—FJMT suggested a surprising alternative., Dodge Data & Analytics, archived from the original on 1 April 2015
