= Nancy Phelan =

Australian writer

- Born: Nancy Eleanor Creagh; 2 August 1913; Sydney, Australia
- Died: 11 January 2008 (aged 94); Sydney, Australia
- Spouse: Raymond ("Pete") Phelan
- Children: Vanessa Phelan
- Relatives: Louise Mack (aunt); Charles Mackerras (cousin)

Nancy Phelan (2 August 1913 – 11 January 2008) was an Australian writer who published over 25 books, including novels, biographies, memoirs, travel books and a cookbook. She travelled widely throughout Europe, the Pacific, Asia and the Middle East.

== Life and career ==
Nancy Eleanor Creagh was born in Sydney, and had "a magical childhood, spent wandering the shores of Sydney Harbour near Chinamans Beach and The Spit on Middle Harbour with her friends and extended family". She studied at the Conservatorium of Music and the University of Sydney. However, as a teenager she saw the limitations of her suburban life and was keen to travel, so in 1938 she bought a one-way ticket to England. She met her husband, Raymond "Pete" Phelan, in London near the beginning of the war, and had her daughter, Vanessa, there. She and her daughter were evacuated to Devon where she spent her war years while her husband was in the Navy.

She returned to Australia with her family in 1945 and quickly joined the thriving arts scene of Potts Point, Kings Cross and Elizabeth Bay. In 1946, she obtained work as a visual aids officer with the South Pacific Commission, and travelled frequently to the South Pacific islands. In 1951, she became assistant organiser for Island literature in the Commission's Social Development Section, but she resigned in 1956 to write full-time. Her first book, Atoll Holiday, published in 1958, was inspired by her three-month stay in the Gilbert Islands. Her writings of her travelling alone in places such as Turkey and post-war Japan "shocked her readership".

In addition to writing books, she also wrote short stories and articles, and was a reviewer for The Sydney Morning Herald in 1970 and the Melbourne Age in 1972.

Phelan was the niece of Amy (1876—1939) and Louise Mack (1870—1935), a Hobart-born writer who became the first female war correspondent during the First World War, and the cousin of Australian conductor, Charles Mackerras. She wrote biographies of both. Her friends included writers like Patrick White, Kylie Tennant, Dorothy Hewett, Jessica Anderson, Nancy Keesing, Elizabeth Harrower and Peter Porter, and the artist Jeffrey Smart.

The Patrick White Award judges said that she wrote with "delicious verve and humour" and that her "passion for life has led her to explore other cultures and to write memorably about them whether in fiction or non-fiction".

Towards the end of her life, Phelan said that she wanted to push her prose towards poetry: "Poetry gets to the crux of things in a beautiful and arresting way ... That's the sort of writing I would like to be able to do. I don't know that I will ever get there. It's a very difficult job, writing, isn't it?"

== Awards and nominations ==
- 1950: The Sydney Morning Herald novel competition. Third prize for The Voice Beyond the Tree
- 1984: Braille Book of the Year Award for The Swift Foot of Time
- 1987: Miles Franklin Award. Nominated for Home is the Sailor
- 1988: Foundation of Australian Literary Studies award for Home is the Sailor, and The Best of Intentions
- 2004: Patrick White Award

== Works ==
=== Novels ===
- The River and the Brook (1962)
- Serpents in Paradise (1967)
- The Voice Beyond the Trees (1985) (ISBN 0-908090-83-8)
- Home Is the Sailor; and The Best of Intentions (1987) (ISBN 0-947062-15-7)

=== Autobiographies and memoirs ===
- A Kingdom by the Sea (1969)
- The Swift Foot of Time: An Australian in England (1983) (ISBN 0-908128-21-5)
- Setting Out on the Voyage: The World of an Incorrigible Adventurer (contains A Kingdom by the Sea and Hearts of Oak) (1998) (ISBN 0-7022-2996-2)
- Writing Round the Edges: A Selective Memoir (2003) (ISBN 0-7022-3374-9)

=== Biographies ===
- Charles Mackerras: A Musicians' Musician (1987) (ISBN 0-575-03620-6)
- The Romantic Lives of Louise Mack (1991) (ISBN 0-7022-2361-1)

=== Travel ===
- Atoll Holiday (1958)
- Welcome the Wayfarer: A Traveller in Modern Turkey (1965)
- Pillow of Grass (1969) (ISBN 0-333-10034-4)
- The Chilean Way: Travels in Chile (1973) (ISBN 0-333-14392-2)
- Morocco Is a Lion (1982) (ISBN 0-908128-18-5)

=== Other non-fiction ===
- How to Make Your Own Filmstrips (1954)
- Yoga for Women (with Michael Volin) (1963)
- Yoga Over Forty (with Michael Volin) (1965)
- Yoga Breathing (with Michael Volin) (1966) (ISBN 0-7207-0116-3)
- Sex and Yoga (with Michael Volin) (1967)
- Some Came Early, Some Came Late (1970) (ISBN 0-333-11896-0)
- Beginner's Guide to Yoga (1973) (ISBN 0-7207-0671-8)
- Mosman Impressions (1993) (ISBN 0-646-12976-7)
- Pieces of Heaven in the South Seas (1996) (ISBN 0-7022-2756-0)
