= Richard Francis-Jones =

Australian architect

Richard Francis-Jones (born 1960, Hertfordshire, England) is a highly awarded Australian architect. He is the design director of the multidisciplinary design practice Francis-Jones Carpenter (fjcstudio), formerly Francis-Jones Morehen Thorp (fjmt). He is a Life Fellow of the Australian Institute of Architects, an honorary fellow of the American Institute of Architects and a Member of the Royal Institute of British Architects.

== Education ==
Francis-Jones graduated from the University of Sydney with a Bachelor of Science (Architecture) in 1981 and a Bachelor of Architecture with First Class Honours and the University Medal in 1985. He attended Columbia University on an ITT Fellowship, where he studied under Kenneth Frampton, completing a Master of Science in Architecture and Building Design in 1987. He subsequently taught at Columbia University as an Adjunct Associate Professor of Architecture. Francis-Jones has taught at many Schools of architecture in Australia, is a former Visiting Professor at the University of New South Wales, and most recently has been teaching at the University of Technology Sydney.

== Practice ==
Following his studies at Columbia University, Francis-Jones practised at firms in New York, Los Angeles and Paris before returning to Sydney in 1989 where he joined fjcstudio’s predecessor, MGT Sydney. He became a director of the firm in 1996 and was a founding partner of Francis-Jones Morehen Thorp in 2003 and Francis-Jones Carpenter in 2023.

fjcstudio (formerly fjmt) has a reputation as an ideas-driven practice "with an agenda for strong public engagement and masterful resolution of tectonics" and the firm’s work demonstrates "an extraordinary ability to uncover the real and often contradictory issues and potentials of a project by a very careful analysis of purpose and place".

Most of the firm’s major commissions have been won by competition and Francis-Jones is supportive of the power of the architectural competition to produce good architecture and create new opportunities for practices: "the more public the competition… the greater the contribution to the wider culture of architecture."

Francis-Jones’ approach is a response to the transition from industrial to digital economies and investigations utilising emerging sciences and technologies are evident. Yet, Francis-Jones considers the potential of this knowledge to address society’s challenges and give architects new scope for imagination is limited by the tendency for architecture to be reduced to fetishised object for consumption. "An authentic contemporary architecture should not only attempt to somehow begin to reconcile humanity’s place in the world but also be directed towards rejuvenating, repoliticising our desiccated public realm. We should pursue an architecture appropriate to citizens rather than consumers."

'…Francis-Jones has possibly been at his best in civic works... More than any other contemporary practice of comparable calibre in Australia, FJMT has been consistently engaged in the design and construction of large-scale public and/or commercial buildings ...Many of these works derive their plastic character from the unique, rather theatrical concept of lateral exfoliation, that is to say the folding out of brises soleil so as to visually engage the surrounding landscape, thereby emphasising a topographical affinity between the building and its context. In all of this work the issue of sustainability is given priority…'

Richard Francis-Jones has led the design for numerous award-winning projects, including the WAF World Building of the Year in 2013 and 2024, the RIBA International Award, the AIA Jørn Utzon Award, the NZ Architecture Medal, AIA Sir Zelman Cowen Award, the AIA William Wardell Award and the Sir John Sulman Medallion.

Francis-Jones was the creative director of the Australian Institute of Architects’ 2008 National Conference, Critical Visions: Form Representation and the Culture of Globalisation, and is an editor of Skyplane and Content: a journal of architecture. Francis-Jones was President of the RAIA (NSW Chapter) from 2001–2002 and was a member of the NSW Architects Registration Board from 2001-2004. He is the Creative Director of ‘circlesix’, a design and architecture venue for critical debate and idea exchange (2025-present)

He is the author of a recently published book on architecture with a second publication due for release in 2026.

Truth and Lies in Architecture (2021)

'These essays written by a leading Australian architect represent a level of comprehensive critical awareness rarely found within the architectural profession and one would be hard pressed to find another comparable figure in contemporary architectural practice...The entire argumentation is impressive, challenging, intellectually at the highest level and beautifully written' – Kenneth Frampton

'Truth and Lies is a tour de force of big architectural issues: truth, lies, theory, image, intuition and consciousness, to name a few... it is both confronting and inspiring in its scope, capturing perfectly the enormity and terror of the architect's task.' – Chris Barton, Architecture Now

== Books ==
- Architecture as Material Culture
- Truth and Lies in Architecture

== Notable projects ==
- UTS Central
- Darlington Public School
- Surry Hills Library & Community Centre
- Inner Sydney High School
- EY Centre
- Te Ao Mārama - Auckland War Memorial Museum
- The Frank Bartlett Library and Moe Service Centre
- Auckland Art Gallery Toi o Tamaki
- Craigieburn
- Bankstown Library and Knowledge Centre
- Sydney Law School, University of Sydney
- The John Niland Scientia, University of New South Wales
- The Red Centre, University of New South Wales
- St. Barnabas, Broadway
- Darling Quarter, Sydney
- The Waterfront Pavilion – Australian National Maritime Museum
- Bunjil Place
- Sofitel Sydney Darling Harbour
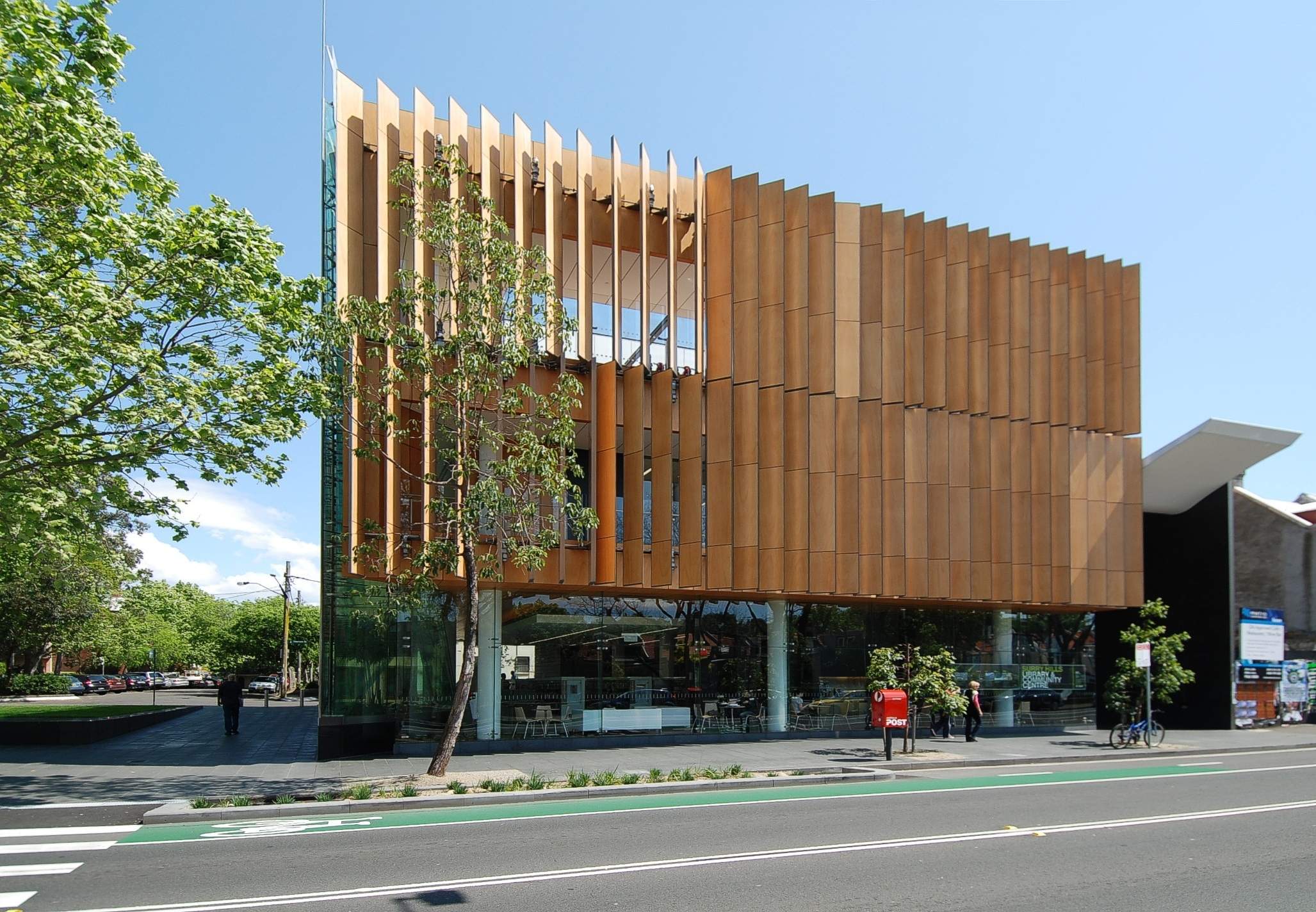
Surry Hills Library

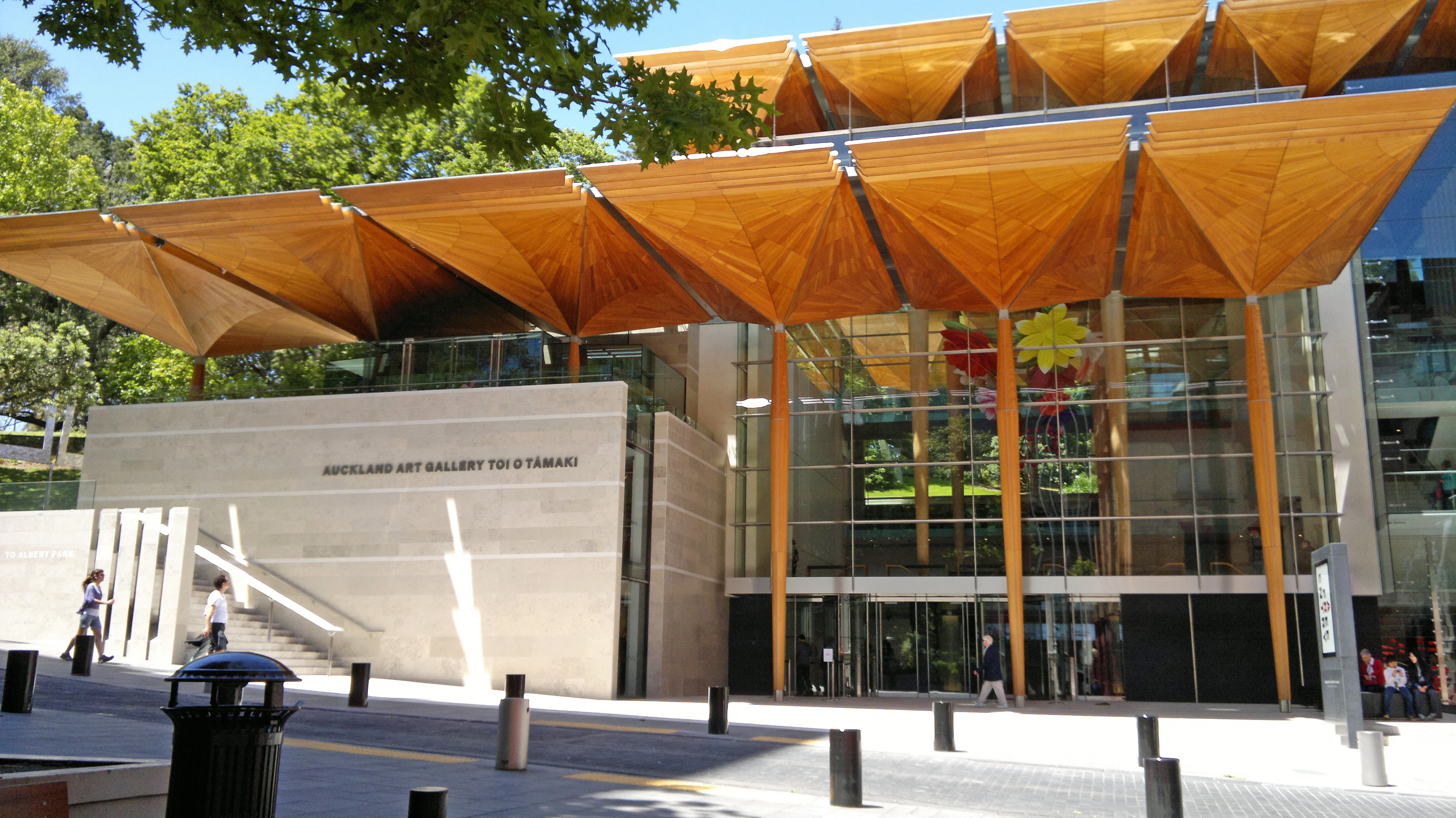
Auckland Art Gallery redevelopment

== Awards ==
- Australia Award for Urban Design 2012, PIA
- City of Sydney Lord Mayor’s Prize 2013, AIA (NSW)
- Greenway Award for Conservation 2005, AIA
- International Award 2012, RIBA
- International Public Library of the Year 2014, Danish Agency for Culture
- John Verge Award for Interior Architecture 2010, 2015 AIA (NSW)
- Jorn Utzon Award for International Architecture 2012, AIA
- Lachlan Macquarie Award for Heritage 2005, AIA
- Lloyd Rees Award for Excellence in Civic Design 2000, 2013, AIA (NSW)
- Milo Dunphy Award for Sustainable Architecture 2010, 2013, AIA (NSW)
- National Architecture Award for Public Architecture 2010, AIA
- National Architecture Award for Sustainable Architecture 2010, AIA
- NZ Architecture Medal 2012, NZIA
- Sir Arthur G Stephenson Award for Best Commercial Architecture 2013, AIA (NSW)
- Sir John Sulman Award for Outstanding Public Architecture
- Sir Zelman Cowen Award 2000, AIA
- WAF Office Category Winner 2011, 2014
- World Building of the Year Award 2013, WAF
- World Building of the Year Award 2024, WAF
- William Wardell Award 2018

== Bibliography ==
- fjmt studio I Maestri dell'Architettura Collector's Edition - Hachette Publishing, 2019
- Architecture as Material Culture: The Work of Francis-Jones Morehen Thorp with Kenneth Frampton - Oro Editions, 2013
- In the Realm of Learning - The University of Sydney's New Law School by Richard Francis-Jones: Images Publishing, 2009
- The Mint Project by Robert (Editor) Griffin, Paul Berkemeier, Richard Francis-Jones, Gerard Reinmuth, Peter Watts, Philip Thalis, 2009
- World of Art Modern Architecture: A Critical History (Fifth Edition) by Kenneth Frampton, 2020
