= Sydney Law School =

Law faculty of the University of Sydney

Coordinates: 33.869008°S 151.210762°E

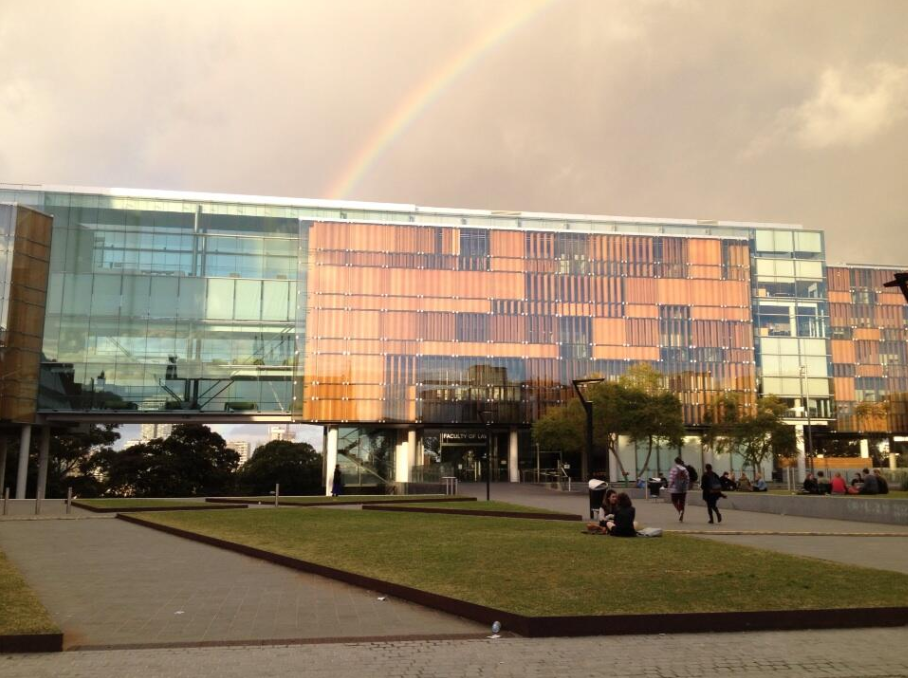
- New Law School building
- Parent school: University of Sydney
- Established: 1855; 171 years ago
- School type: Public
- Dean: Fleur Johns
- Location: Sydney, New South Wales, Australia
- Enrollment: 2,310 (2019)
- Faculty: 106 (2020)
- Website: sydney.edu.au/law

Sydney Law School (informally Sydney Law or SLS) is the law school at the University of Sydney, Australia's oldest university. Sydney Law School began a full program of legal instruction in 1890 following the appointment of its first dean, having offered legal examinations since 1855.

The law school has produced many leaders in law and politics, including six prime ministers, four federal opposition leaders, two governors-generals, eleven federal attorneys-generals, and 20 out of 56 justices of the High Court—more than any other law school in Australia. The school has also produced 24 Rhodes Scholars and several Gates Scholars.

In 2010, the School replaced its graduate-entry Bachelor of Laws (LL.B.) degree with the Juris Doctor (J.D.) degree. The LL.B. degree remains as part of an undergraduate double degree program. Today, it has approximately 1,700 LL.B. and J.D. students, 1,500 postgraduate coursework students, and 100 postgraduate research students. There are now 24 chairs, including the Challis Professors of Law, Jurisprudence and International Law.

== History ==
The law school was inaugurated in 1855 and established by the Act to Incorporate and Endow the University of Sydney 1850 (NSW) and an 1855 University Senate by-law, becoming the third faculty (after the Faculty of Arts and Sydney Medical School) of the University of Sydney.

The Faculty of Law commenced its work in 1859, primarily as a body of assessment and examination rather than teaching. In 1890, the first chair was appointed to the faculty and a full legal academic programme commenced at the Faculty.

Prior to 2011, Sydney Law School was the sole school under the Faculty of Law, under the College of Arts and Humanities, one of the three constituent colleges of the university. As part of a re-organisation of faculty organisation, in 2011 the Faculty of Law was renamed Sydney Law School, adopting the better-known name of its sole school.

== Reputation and student achievements ==
Sydney Law School is widely regarded as being one of Australia's top law schools. In 2022, QS World University Rankings ranked the law school 16th in the world (3rd nationally, 2nd in Sydney, 4th in Asia-Pacific). In 2016, the Social Science Research Network ranked the law school as first in Australia and fifth in the world in the number of downloads of academic papers which have been uploaded to its website. Sydney Law School has won the Philip C. Jessup International Law Moot Court Competition on a record six occasions: in 1996, 2007, 2011, 2015, 2017 and 2021.

=== NICA ranking ===
The NICA rankings evaluate law schools based on their performance in moot court competitions. The rankings consider two factors: the weight of the competitions, determined by the number of participating law schools, and the advancement of teams within these competitions. The system provides a straightforward comparison of law schools' performance in moot courts. Sydney Law School is consistently a top performer in international moot court competitions, obtaining an average world ranking of 80th and an average Australian ranking of 4th.

Sydney Law School International Mooting Rankings 2014–2023
	2014	2015	2016	2017	2018	2019	2020	2021	2022	2023	Average
World ranking	325th	4th	6th	6th	36th	12th	374th	3rd	6th	28th	80th
Australia ranking	12th	1st	2nd	1st	4th	1st	14th	1st	2nd	3rd	4th

== Campus ==
=== Former St James campus ===
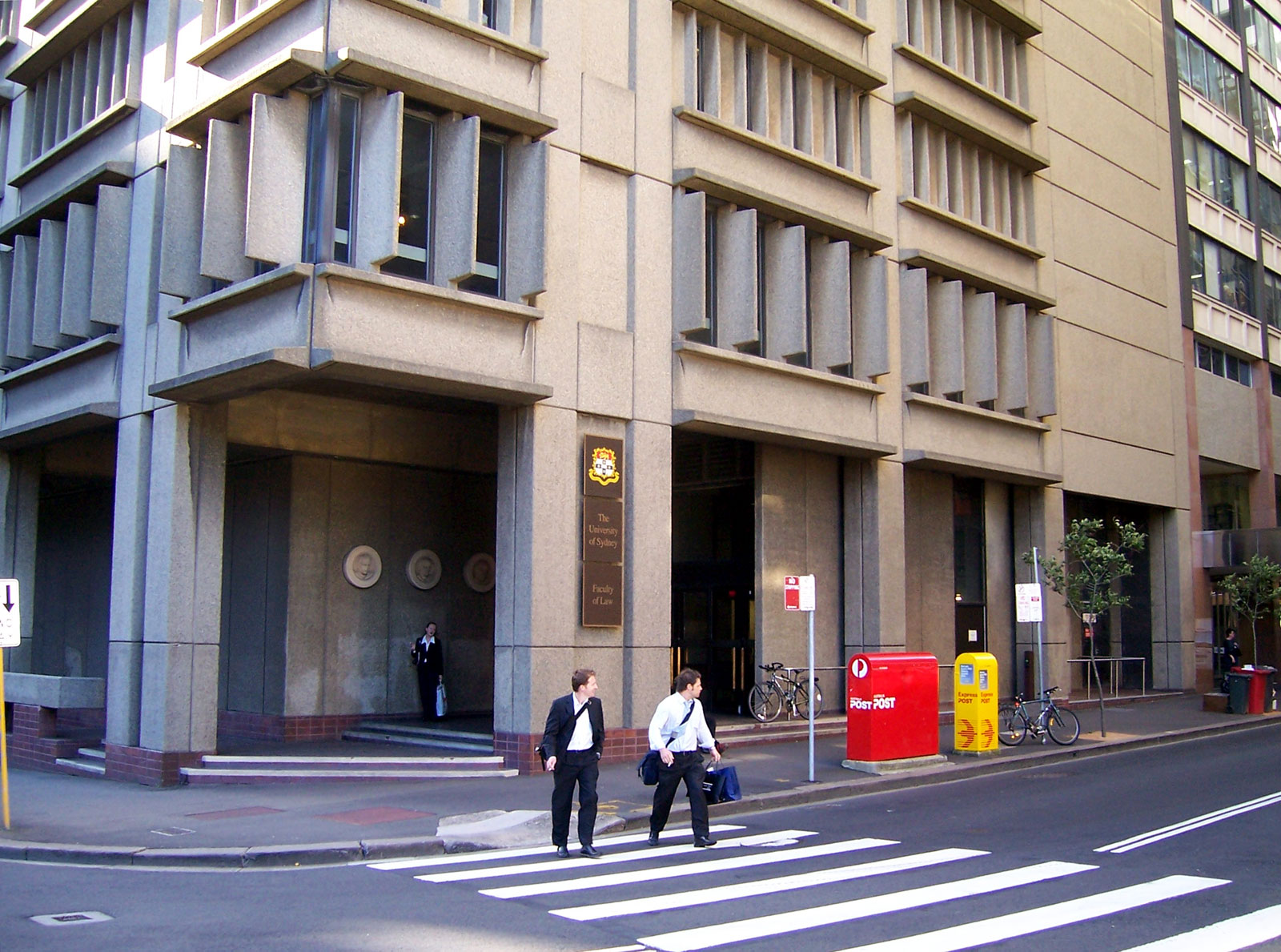
Old Law School building

The law school building on Phillip Street in the centre of Sydney's legal and business district was the home of the Sydney Law School until early 2009. While the faculty is now located in the New Law School building on the main Camperdown campus of the university, some classes and other functions continued to be hosted on the St James campus until 2015, and students could still submit assignments there. As of 1 July 2015, the building is no longer owned by the university, and the law school's CBD operations have been relocated to 133 Castlereagh Street, Sydney.

The former St James campus is bounded by Elizabeth, King and Phillip streets and is opposite the Supreme Court of New South Wales. The building consists of 13 dedicated levels, three of which are underground. Level four is the ground entrance level and housed the assembly hall, a foyer, and some offices; levels one and two housed "Harvard-style" lecture theatres; level three housed a staff car park and other amenities; level five housed University of Sydney Union premises, including the office of the Sydney University Law Society (SULS), until their relocation to the New Law School Building on the Main Campus at Camperdown and Darlington. The Sydney University Law Library and the Faculty of Law's information desk were located on levels seven to ten and twelve, respectively. These facilities have since relocated to level zero to one and level three of the New Law Building, respectively.

The building was constructed in 1969 in the brutalist architectural style. Busts of classical orators and jurists adorn the Phillip Street entrance, while the University of Sydney crest is found on the Elizabeth Street and Phillip Street entrance. The former St James campus is located near S. James railway station and Martin Place railway station and is serviced by a bus stop outside its entrance on Elizabeth Street.

=== New Law School building ===
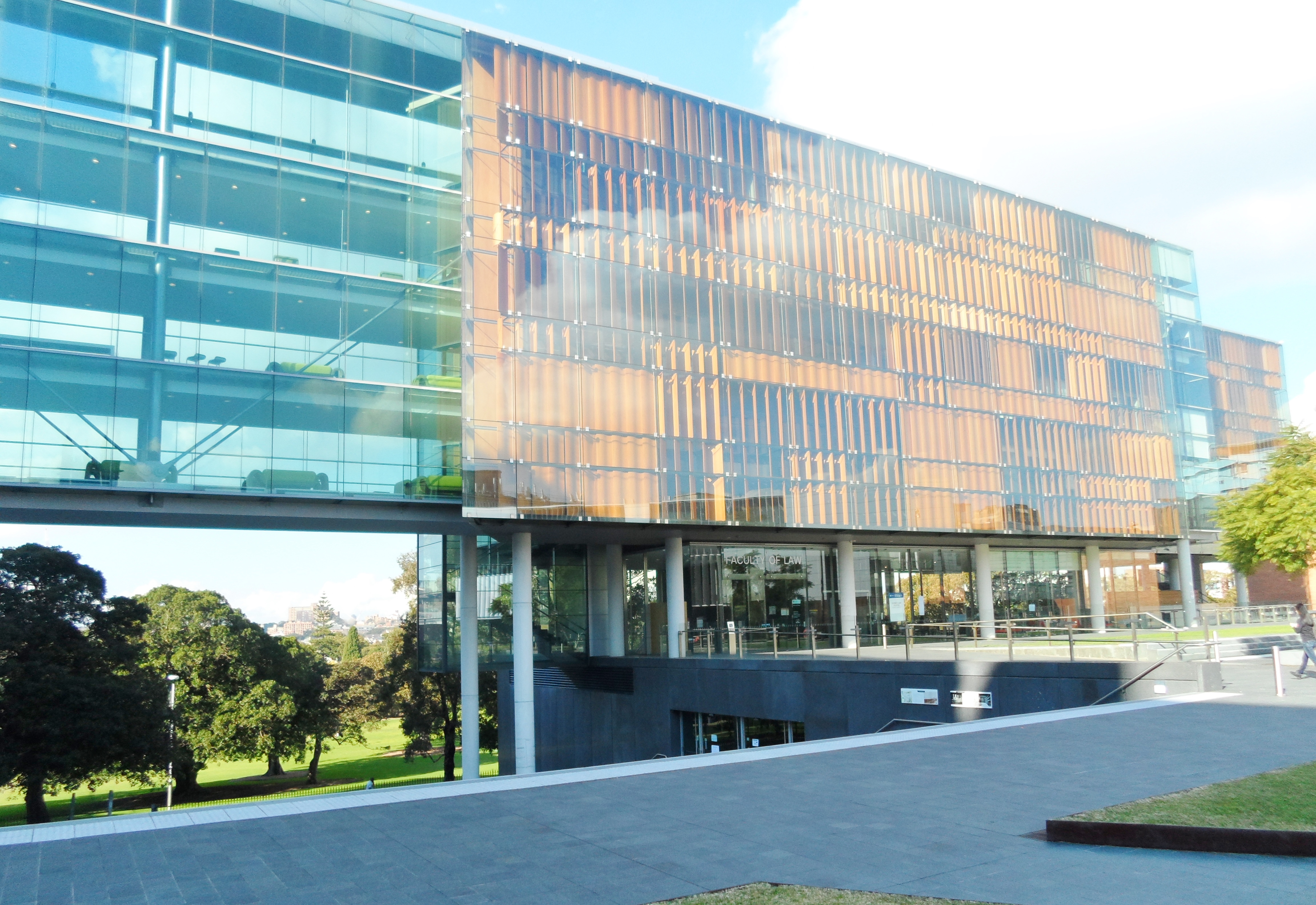
New Law School building

Sydney Law School had changed location several times in the past but had always remained in the centre of the city because of the tradition of teaching by practitioners, and for easy access to the courts and members of the profession. However, with the increased number of enrolled students, the campus in the city was no longer sufficient for both staff and students and hence, the faculty proposed to shift the law school to the main campus in Camperdown. Consequently, a new law school was constructed at the main Camperdown campus, adjacent to Fisher Library and on the site of the former Edgeworth David Building. Completed in February 2009, the faculty administration began occupation in mid-February, prior to classes beginning in early March.

On 30 April 2009, the New Law School Building was officially opened by Governor-General of Australia Quentin Bryce. Also in attendance were Robert French, Chief Justice of the High Court of Australia; Murray Gleeson, immediate past Chief Justice of the High Court; Jim Spigelman, Chief Justice of the Supreme Court of New South Wales; and Malcolm Turnbull, then leader of the Federal opposition. Numerous seminars and other sessions were held as part of the building's opening day program.

The design and construction of the New Law School Building were each performed by local Australian firms, namely FJMT (Francis-Jones Morehen Thorp) Architects and Baulderstone Pty Ltd, respectively. The building is in the style of late-20th-century International Style architecture and is characterised by its blue tint glass exterior walls.

== Academics ==
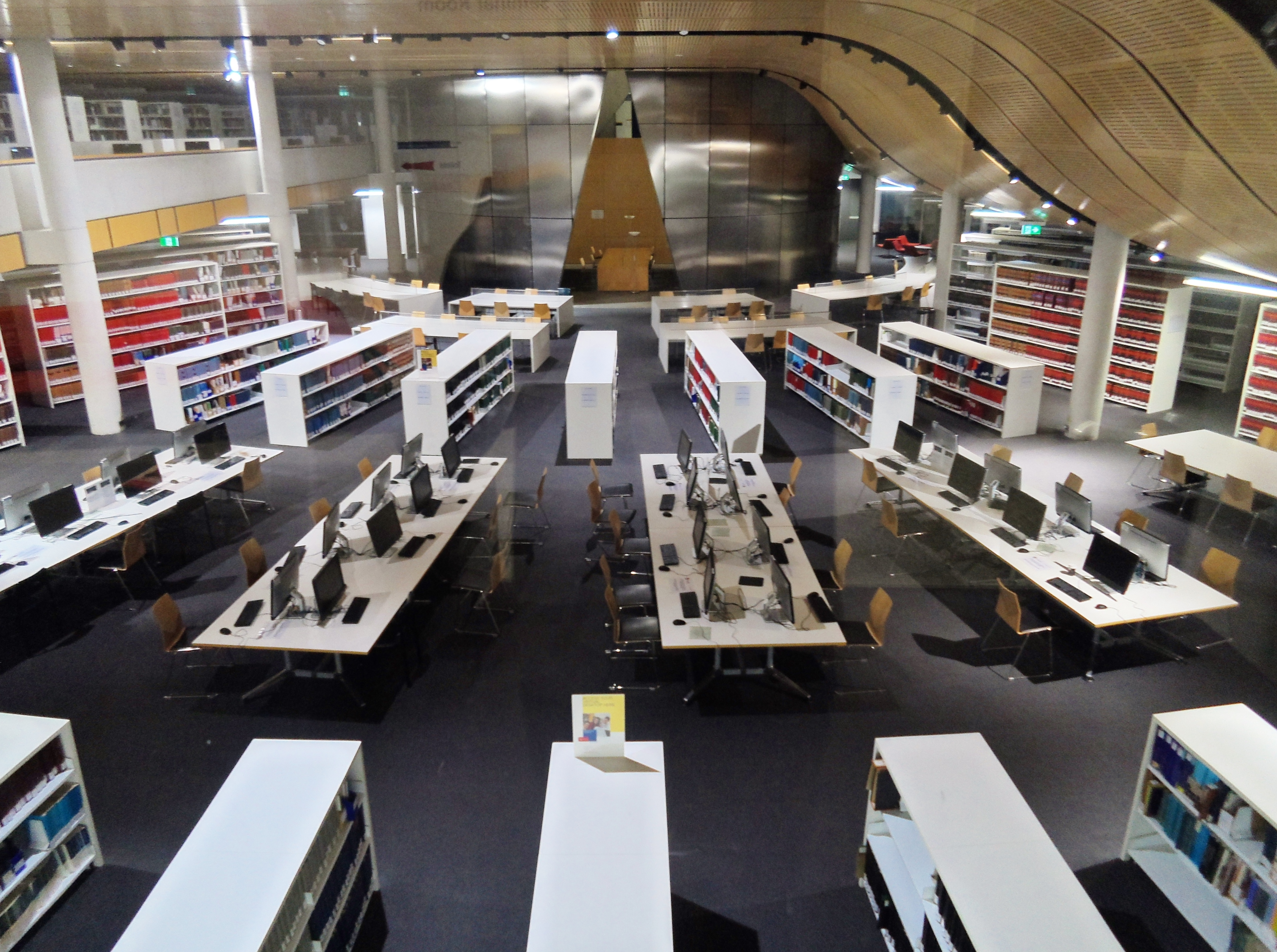
Herbert Smith Freehills Law Library

=== Programs ===
The Sydney Law School offers the professional degrees of Bachelor of Laws (LL.B.) (combined with another bachelor's degree) for undergraduate-entry, and the Juris Doctor (J.D.) for graduate-entry. The law school also offers higher-research degrees, namely the Masters of Criminology by Research, the Master of Laws by Research, the Doctor of Juridical Science, and the Doctor of Philosophy in Law. In addition to this, the law school offers postgraduate coursework degrees such as the Master of Laws by coursework, and diplomas and non-degree study in specialist areas of law and government for both law and non-law graduates.

Sydney Law School has an arrangement with the University of Cambridge and the University of Oxford under which high-achieving Sydney students who are accepted into a postgraduate law program at Cambridge or Oxford can commence their postgraduate studies in the second last semester of their Sydney law degree, and count those studies towards their Bachelor of Laws degree.

=== Research centres and institutes ===
Sydney Law School has a number of associated Research Centres:

- Australian Centre for Climate and Environmental Law (ACCEL)
- Centre for Asian and Pacific Law (CAPLUS)
- Constitutional Reform Unit
- Julius Stone Institute of Jurisprudence
- Ross Parsons Centre of Commercial, Corporate and Taxation Law
- Sydney Centre for International Law (SCIL)
- Sydney Institute of Criminology
- Sydney Health Law
- Australian Network for Japanese Law (ANJeL)

=== Publications ===
Sydney Law School Law publishes several academic journals, including the Sydney Law Review, Current Issues in Criminal Justice, Asia Pacific Journal of Environmental Law, and Australian International Law Journal.

== Admissions ==
For admission into the Combined Law program in 2017, domestic students required an Australian Tertiary Admission Rank (ATAR) or equivalent of 99.5, or an International Baccalaureate (IB) score of 43 points. In 2016, the ATAR cut-off was 99.5, with the median ATAR for all students who were accepted for that year being 99.55.

Admission to the Master of Laws by coursework program requires a Bachelor of Laws or Juris Doctor with a Distinction average to be competitive.

Admission to postgraduate research programs, such as the Doctor of Philosophy in law, generally requires a master's degree or a bachelor's degree with first or second class honours, as well as the acceptance of a satisfactory research proposal and "satisfactory evidence of skills, knowledge and the ability to pursue and complete the proposed program". This may be demonstrated by successful completion of sustained research, scholarly publications, and sustained research in a professional capacity.

== Student organisations ==
Many student organisations operate in association with the Sydney Law School, to cater to law students. The Sydney University Law Society (SULS), formed in 1902, represents all law students at the university. The Chinese Law Students Society (CLSS), formed in 2004, provides services with a more international outlook. The South East Asian Law Society (SEALS), caters to all students and especially those from South East Asian nations. The Korean Law Students Society at the University of Sydney (KLUS), caters to Korean ethnic students, formed in 1997. The St Thomas More Society, caters to Catholic students. The Sydney University Evangelical Union (SUEU) Business & Law Faculty (BIZLAW), caters to Evangelical/Protestant students.

== Notable alumni ==
In its over 171 years of history, the Sydney Law School has produced a prominent group of alumni.

== Notable faculty ==
=== Deans ===
1. 1890–1910: Pitt Cobbett
2. 1910–1942: John Peden
3. 1942–1946: James Williams
4. 1946–1947: Clive Teece (acting)
5. 1947–1973: Keith Shatwell
6. 1974–1977: David Benjafield
7. 1978–1979: Dyson Heydon
8. 1980–1985: John Mackinolty
9. 1986–1989: Colin Phegan
10. 1990–1992: James Crawford
11. 1992–1993: Alex Ziegert (acting)
12. 1993–1994: Colin Phegan (acting)
13. 1994–1997: David Weisbrot
14. 1998–1999: Ros Atherton (acting)
15. 1999–2002: Jeremy Webber
16. 2002–2007: Ron McCallum
17. 2007–2012: Gillian Triggs
18. 2012–2013: Greg Tolhurst (acting)
19. 2013–2018: Joellen Riley
20. 2019–2019: Cameron Stewart (acting)
21. 2019–2024: Simon Bronitt
22. 2024-2025: Rita Shackel (acting)
23. 2025-present: Fleur Johns

=== Notable professors ===
- James Crawford, former Justice of the International Court of Justice (2014–2021), and former Dean and Challis Professor of International Law.
- Ron McCallum, former Blake Dawson Waldron Professor in Industrial Law and Dean
- Joellen Riley, current Professor of Labour Law
- Ben Saul, current Challis Professor of International Law
- Julius Stone, former Challis Professor of Jurisprudence
- Gillian Triggs former Challis Professor of International Law
- George Winterton, former Professor of Constitutional Law
- William Gummow, former Justice of the High Court of Australia

== See also ==
- Group of Eight (Australian universities)
