= Joellen Riley =

- Born: 1957 (age 67–68)
- Occupation(s): labour lawyer, academic
- Known for: dean of the Sydney Law School (2013-2018)

Joellen Riley (born 1957) is an Australian labour lawyer and academic at the University of Technology Sydney. From 2013 to 2018, she was the dean of the Sydney Law School.

== Early life and earlier education ==
Riley attended the University of Sydney, where she earned a B.A. and M.A. in English literature and a Diploma of Education (Secondary), in order to become a teacher.

== Early career ==
Prior to becoming a lawyer, Riley worked as a finance journalist at Fairfax Media.

== Legal education ==
In 1992, Riley commenced a graduate law degree (LL.B.) at the University of Sydney, graduating with first class honours and the University Medal. After earning her law degree, Riley completed a Diploma of Legal Practice at the College of Law in North Sydney and worked at Mallesons Stephen Jaques (now King & Wood Mallesons) before receiving the Ivan Roberts Scholarship that permitted her to study at the University of Oxford, where she graduated with a B.C.L.

== Career ==
After the defeat of Paul Keating by John Howard and the commencement of the tabling of the Workplace Relations Act 1996, Riley became interested in labour law and, soon thereafter, began to teach the area and completed a Ph.D., under the supervision of Ronald C. McCallum and Patrick Parkinson, in employment, equity, and commercial law.

Riley also attended the Macquarie Graduate School of Management, where she earned a Graduate Diploma of Management.

Following the departure of Gillian Triggs as Dean of the Sydney Law School in mid-2012, Riley was appointed as Triggs' successor in early 2013. She was made emeritus professor in 2019 following her retirement for the University of Sydney.

== Personal life ==
Riley is married to lawyer John Munton, with whom she has two daughters, Alexandra and Philippa.
