= Jack Roderick (civil engineer) =

Professor Jack Roderick FIStructE FICE FTSE FAA

Challis Professor of Civil Engineering, University of Sydney
- In office 1951–1978

Personal details
- Born: Jack William Roderick; 1913 Edmonton, Alberta, Canada
- Died: 1990 (aged 76–77)

Jack William Roderick (1913–1990) was Challis Professor of Civil Engineering at the University of Sydney from 1951 until his retirement in 1978. He was born in Edmonton, Alberta.
