= Pitt Cobbett =

Australian academic, jurist and editor

William Pitt Cobbett (26 July 1853 – 17 October 1919) was an Australian academic, jurist, and editor. Cobbett was the founding Challis Chair of Law of the University of Sydney Faculty of Law.

== Early life and education ==
Born to Pitt Cobbett and Caroline (née Richards), William Pitt Cobbett was born on 26 July 1853 in Adelaide, South Australia. Pitt Cobbett was a wine merchant and, after returning to England, in 1864, was an ordained priest. The senior Pitt Cobbett, after filling various curacies, was vicar of the Church of the Holy Rood, Crofton, Hampshire, between 1874 and 1901.

Cobbett was educated at Alleyn's College of God's Gift (Dulwich College), London, between 1869 and 1872, and played rugby union for the school. He matriculated in October 1873 and entered University College, Oxford. At Oxford, Cobbett graduated with a B.A. in 1876, a B.C.L. and M.A. in 1880, and a D.C.L. in 1887. He also won the university amateur middleweight boxing championship.

== Career ==
Following his graduation from Oxford, Cobbett was admitted as a student at Gray's Inn on 4 May 1875. On 18 November 1878, he was called to the bar; but, instead of practising law and despite having chambers at 4 King's Bench Walk Temple, Cobbett tutored at Oxford and in London.

On 3 February 1890, Cobbett was appointed the inaugural Challis Chair of Law of the University of Sydney Faculty of Law. From September, he was an ex officio member of the University of Sydney Senate. He also became the Chairman of the Professorial Board of the University of Sydney.

=== Sydney Law School ===
In 1891, Cobbett became the first University of Sydney Faculty of Law Dean of Law.

Cobbett lectured extensively, in jurisprudence, Roman law, constitutional law, and international law. Following the university's cost-cutting after financial difficulties in 1893, Cobbett also lectured in property law.

=== Later career ===
After his retirement from the University of Sydney Faculty of Law, Cobbett relocated to Hobart, where he worked on a book, to be titled The Government of Australia, dealing with the Constitution of Australia. Before it was ready for publication, however, Cobbett died of cancer at his home in Holebrook Place (now Davey Street) on 17 October 1919, and was buried in the Anglican section of Cornelian Bay Cemetery.

== Honours ==
Sydney Law School honours its first Challis Chair of Law and Dean through the eponymous Pitt Cobbett Scholarships.
