= Launcelot Harrison =

Australian zoologist and entomologist

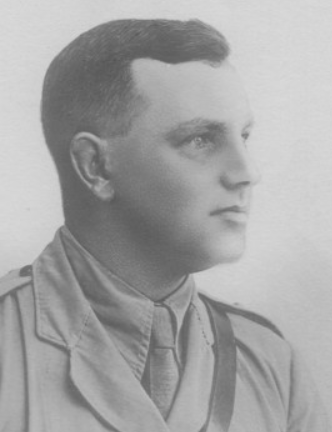
Launcelot Harrison 1880–1928

Launcelot Harrison (13 July 1880 – 20 February 1928) was an Australian zoologist, entomologist and NSW rugby union player who held the Challis Chair in Zoology from 1922 until his untimely death from a cerebral haemorrhage. He married writer Amy Mack on 29 February 1908. His 1915 study found that host and parasite body sizes tended to positively co-vary; this finding was dubbed Harrison's rule.

During World War I he served as an advising entomologist (ranked Lieutenant) to the British Expeditionary Force in Mesopotamia.

His students included Claire Weekes, the first woman to earn a doctorate at the University of Sydney.
