= Claire Weekes =

Australian general practitioner and health writer

Claire Weekes MBE
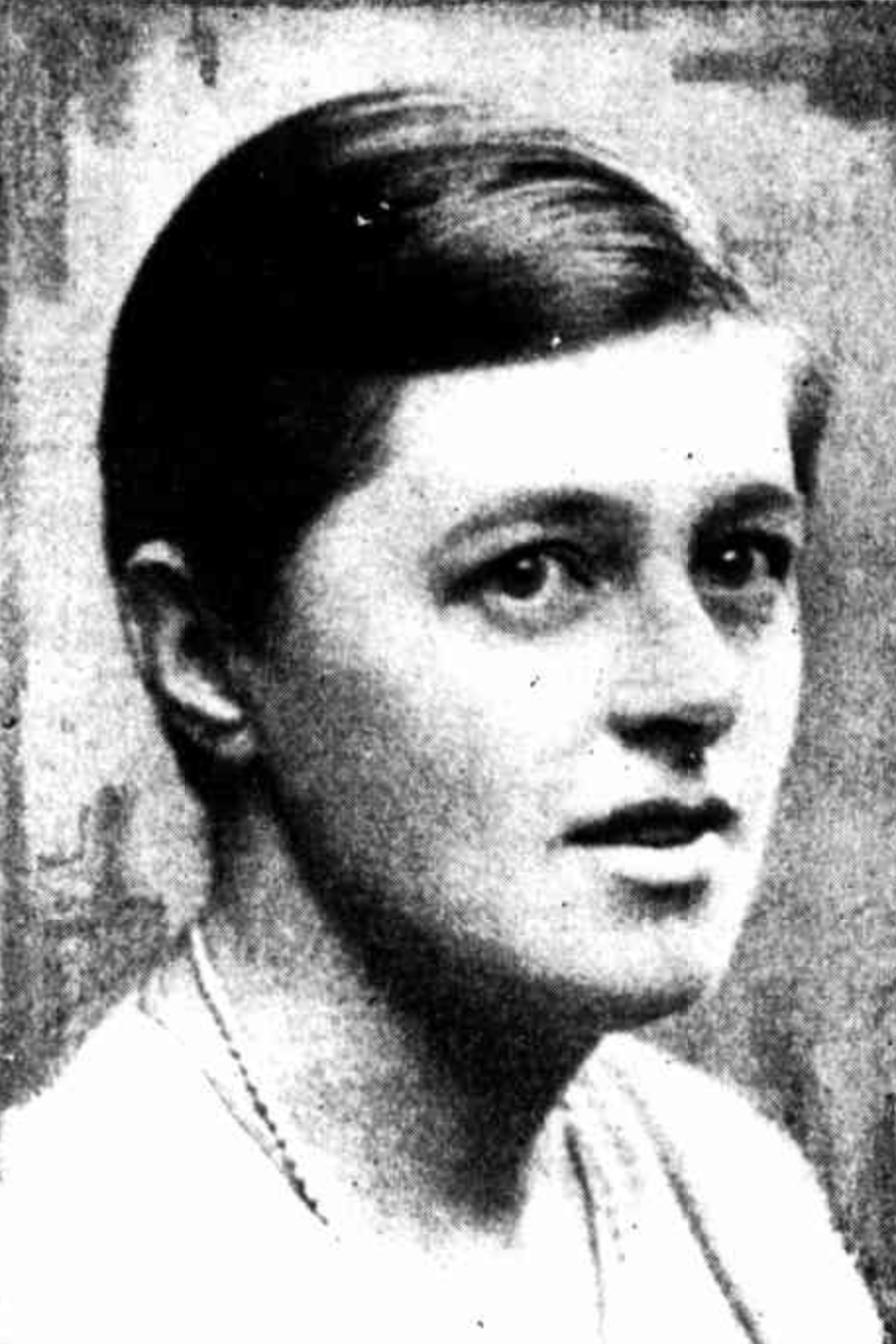
- Claire Weekes, c.1930
- Born: Hazel Claire Weekes; 11 April 1903
- Died: 2 June 1990 (aged 87)
- Education: University of Sydney
- Occupations: General practitioner and health writer
- Known for: Hope and Help for Your Nerves

Hazel Claire Weekes MBE (11 April 1903 – 2 June 1990) was an Australian general practitioner and health writer; she also had an early career as a research scientist working in the field of comparative reproduction. Weekes is considered by many as the pioneer of modern anxiety treatment; she wrote several books on dealing with anxiety disorders.

== Anxiety treatments ==
Weekes found that many of her patients suffered from various anxiety disorders, such as agoraphobia, panic attacks, phobias, generalised anxiety disorder, and obsessive-compulsive disorder. Weekes avoided the term "Anxiety State" as she felt it was too "medical", so she replaced it with "Nervous Illness" instead.

Weekes was concerned with the severe long-term effects anxiety and panic disorders had on the lives of her patients as well as the high failure of typical psychiatric treatments, especially psychoanalysis, which many sufferers had tried. Instead, Weekes developed her own unique treatment program. She noted that patients did not suffer from anxiety problems because they had flawed personalities or traumatic childhoods; rather, the problems were caused by the patient having a habit of fear-avoidance, made worse, or caused, by a very responsive "sensitized" nervous system. She was critical both of Freudian approaches and of attempts by behaviorists to "desensitize" their patients using relaxation and breathing techniques.

Weekes described in her books the three main pitfalls that lead to Nervous Illness. They are sensitization, bewilderment and fear. She explained that so much nervous illness is no more than severe sensitization kept alive by bewilderment and fear. Weekes analyzed fear as two separate fears; the first fear and the second fear. She explained that first fear is the fear that comes reflexively, almost automatically. The patient usually immediately recoils from it, and as he/she does, he/she adds a second fear to the first. Second fear is the fear the patient adds to the first fear. Examples of second fear are "Oh, my goodness! Here it is again! I can't stand it!". It is the second fear that is keeping the first fear alive, keeping the sufferer sensitized and keeping them nervously ill.

Weekes initially used the program on her own patients and then, as word spread of its success, it was issued on records and cassette tapes. Eventually, she developed a self-help pack consisting of a book and tape, with Weekes guiding patients through the program. She has summarized this program as follows; facing the feared situation, accepting the feeling of panic, floating through it, and letting time pass.

Self Help For Your Nerves (1962) (US title: Hope and Help for Your Nerves), Weekes' first book, has sold more than 300,000 copies and has been translated into fourteen languages. It was followed by Peace from Nervous Suffering (1972), Simple Effective Treatment of Agoraphobia (1976) and More Help for Your Nerves (1984). Her fifth and final book The Latest Help for Your Nerves (1989) was published one year before her death.

In 1983, Weekes was interviewed in a series of six talks, called Peace From Nervous Suffering, on the British national TV program Pebble Mill at One, in which she explained her techniques. A transcription of these talks along with two BBC radio interviews and two interviews at White Plains Hospital in New York, were published in her final book The Latest Help for Your Nerves.

In all five of her books, Weekes offers self-help methods and advice. Her work was marked by the personal nature of her approach. Early in her career she had earned both a Doctorate of Science as well as an M.D. Currently, her work is promoted by an organization in Australia set up by her heirs.

Weekes described her own battle with nervous illness in her final book in which she explained how she began suffering from anxiety. At the age of 26, she was misdiagnosed with Tuberculosis which caused her to become anxious and introverted. Weekes' anxiety lasted for two years and gave her valuable insight into nervous illness. Robert L. Dupont describes in his book The Anxiety Cure (1998) that in 1983, he asked Weekes if she had ever had panic disorder. She replied "Yes, I have had what you call panic attacks. In fact, I still have them. Sometimes they wake me at night." DuPont responded by saying he was sorry to hear that. He described Claire Weekes as looking at him in shock, and she responded "Save your sympathy for someone else. I don't need it or want it. What you call a panic attack is merely a few normal chemicals that are temporarily out of place in my brain. It is of no significance whatsoever to me!"

== Early career in biology ==
Claire Weekes began her career as a research scientist, receiving her Doctorate of Science in 1930 from the University of Sydney; she was the first woman to attain that degree from the university. Initially working under Launcelot Harrison, she conducted research on reproduction and placentation in viviparous (live-bearing) lizards from 1925 to 1934; part of this period (1929–1931) was spent in England in the lab of James Peter Hill. Weekes' work led to eight published papers, including a major summary published in 1935 in the Proceedings of the Zoological Society of London. Weekes' work provided the basis an understanding of reptile placentation that lasted for nearly 50 years.

More recent work has continued to build on the empirical and conceptual framework that she established. Weekes' research on the complex placentae of Pseudemoia entrecasteauxii was instrumental in the establishment of the species as a model organism for studying the evolution of pregnancy.

Claire Weekes' published papers in reproductive biology of reptiles:

- Harrison, L.; Weekes, H.C. (1925). "On the occurrence of placentation in the scincid lizard, Lygosoma entrecasteauxi.". Proc. Linn. Soc. N.S.W. 50: 472–486.
- Weekes, H.C. (1927a). Placentation and other phenomena in the scincid lizard Lygosoma (Hinulia) quoyi. Proc. Linn. Soc. N.S.W. 52:499–554.
- Weekes, H.C. (1927b). "A note on reproductive phenomena in some lizards". Proc. Linn. Soc. N.S.W. 52: 25–32.
- Weekes, H.C. (1929). "On placentation in reptiles. I.". Proc. Linn. Soc. N.S.W. 54: 34–60.
- Weekes, H.C. (1930). "On placentation in reptiles. II". Proc. Linn. Soc. N.S.W. 55: 550–576.
- Weekes, H.C. (1933). "On the distribution, habitat, and reproductive habits of certain European and Australian snakes and lizards, with particular regard to their adoption of viviparity". Proc. Linn. Soc. N.S.W. 58: 270–274.
- Weekes, H.C. (1934). "The corpus luteum in certain oviparous and viviparous reptiles". Proc. Linn. Soc. N.S.W. 69: 380–391.
- Weekes, H.C. (1935). "A review of placentation among reptiles, with particular regard to the function and evolution of the placenta". Proc. Linn. Soc. Lond. 2: 625–645.
