= Harrison's rule =

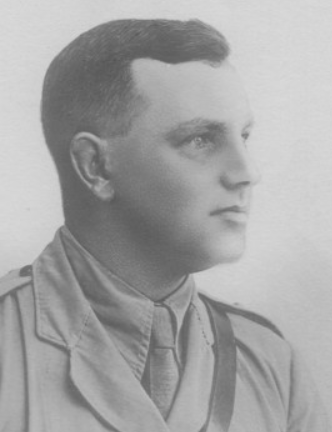
Launcelot Harrison 1880–1928

Harrison's rule is an observation in evolutionary biology by Launcelot Harrison which states that in comparisons across closely related species, host and parasite body sizes tend to covary positively.

== Parasite species' body size increases with host species' body size ==
Launcelot Harrison, an Australian authority in zoology and parasitology, published a study in 1915 concluding that host and parasite body sizes tend to covary positively, a covariation later dubbed as 'Harrison's rule'. Harrison himself originally proposed it to interpret the variability of congeneric louse species. However, subsequent authors verified it for a wide variety of parasitic organisms including nematodes, rhizocephalan barnacles, fleas, lice, ticks, parasitic flies and mites, as well as herbivorous insects associated with specific host plants.

== The variability of parasite size increases with host size ==
Robert Poulin observed that in comparisons across species, the variability of parasite body size also increases with host body size. It is self-evident that we expect greater variation coming together with greater mean body sizes due to an allometric power law scaling effect. However, Poulin referred to parasites' increasing body size variability due to biological reasons, thus we expect an increase greater than that caused by a scaling effect.

Recently, Harnos et al. applied phylogenetically controlled statistical methods to test Harrison's rule and Poulin's s Increasing Variance Hypothesis in avian lice. Their results indicate that the three major families of avian lice (Ricinidae, Menoponidae, Philopteridae) follow Harrison's rule, and two of them (Menoponidae, Philopteridae) also follow Poulin's supplement to it.

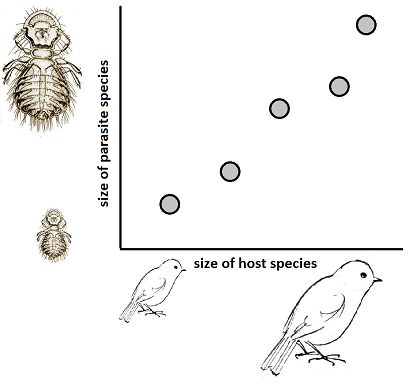
Schematic diagram of Harrison's rule: small host species harbor small, large host species harbor large parasite species

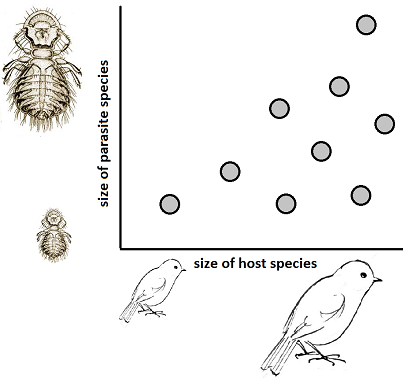
Schematic diagram of Harrison's rule with Poulin's supplement: small host species harbor small, large host species harbor both small and large (on average: larger) parasite species

== Implications ==
The allometry between host and parasite body sizes constitutes an evident aspect of host–parasite coevolution. The slope of this relationship is a taxon-specific character. Parasites' body size covaries positively with fecundity and thus it likely affects the virulence of parasitic infections as well.
