= Wojciech Sadurski =

Polish/Australian constitutional law scholar

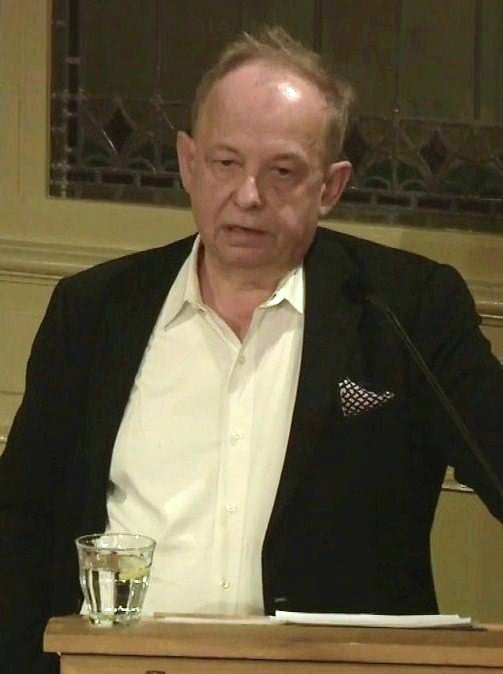
- Sadurski in 2019
- Born: 5 June 1950 (age 76); Warsaw, Poland
- Education: University of Warsaw
- Occupations: Constitutional law scholar and professor

Wojciech Sadurski (born 5 June 1950) is a Polish and Australian scholar of constitutional law. He is Challis Professor in Jurisprudence at the University of Sydney and Professor in the Centre for Europe in the University of Warsaw. He has been a member of the Venice Commission (European Commission for Democracy through Law) since March 2026.

== Academic career ==
Sadurski was born on 5 June 1950 in Warsaw; his father Franciszek Sadurski was a lawyer, Peasant Battalions major, ZSL deputy to the PRL parliament. Sadurski emigrated to Australia in 1981 and holds dual citizenship. According to Associated Press, Sadurski is "a law professor of international renown". He has written several books on constitutional law and has served as a visiting professor at Penn/Carey School of Law at the University of Pennsylvania, Princeton University, Yale Law School, New York University Law School, Cardozo Law School, and University of Trento. He first gained tenure at the Department of Jurisprudence at the University of Sydney, then under Alice Erh-Soon Tay. From 1999 to 2009 he was a professor at the European University Institute in Florence and, from 2003 to 2006, headed its Department of Law. Currently, he is Challis Professor in Jurisprudence at the University of Sydney and Professor in the Centre for Europe in the University of Warsaw.

Sadurski is on the editorial board of European Law Journal, Politics, Philosophy and Economics, and Law and Philosophy Library. Since 2011, he chairs the academic advisory board of Community of Democracies. He is a member of the Global Rule of Law Commission, the Venice Commission, and various other advisory bodies.

== Criticism of the Polish government ==
Sadurski is a vocal critic of the Law and Justice (PiS) party in Poland, which he describes as autocratic and authoritarian. In 2019, he published a book with Oxford University Press titled "Poland's Constitutional Breakdown". The book was translated into Polish by Anna Wójcik; the Polish edition was published in October 2020. Three cases have been brought against him by the ruling party and those affiliated with it. According to Sadurski, the cases "are totally and unambiguously politically motivated. Further, I believe that they are coordinated and syncronised." PiS has also brought libel cases against other critics of the government.

- A member of the disciplinary panel of the Polish supreme court opened an investigation against Sadurski at Warsaw University because he called the members of the disciplinary panel "losers".
- The party sued because Sadurski called it an "organized criminal group" that associated itself with neo-Nazis, in relation to the 2018 National Independence Day march which had significant far-right participation. Sadurski commented, "the ruling party enjoys almost unlimited power and very wide material benefits. It lacks only one thing—the privilege of silencing its critics. This lawsuit is an attempt to seize this privilege." He stated that "I used the term organized crime group as a metaphor to describe activities that require synchronization and coordination of the actions of various political and state entities which, according to the constitution, should be separated from each other, but which, in my opinion, led to coordinated actions leading to the transformation of the democratic system into an authoritarian one." He also argued that if he lost the case, "paradoxically, it would confirm the correctness of my diagnosis". Dozens of journalists, members of the opposition, and human rights activists were present at the trial. The case was dismissed by the trial court, but the party appealed the verdict.
- The third case involves Sadurski's reference to "Goebbelsian" media after the assassination of Paweł Adamowicz. Although not named by Sadurski, the state-owned media company Telewizja Polska brought both criminal and civil suits for defamation. As of October 2020, the case is scheduled to be heard in December 2020. (According to Reporters Without Borders' 2020 assessment, "Partisan discourse and hate speech are still the rule within state-owned media, which have been transformed into government propaganda mouthpieces.")

=== Responses ===
Hundreds of law professors signed a letter in support of Sadurski, stating that there was "a coordinated harassment campaign by the Polish ruling party against a well-known and respected academic who has clearly struck a nerve with his powerful critique of the situation in his native country". According to the open letter, the cases have little chance to succeed if appealed to the European Court of Human Rights or an EU court, because freedom of speech is guaranteed by treaties to which Poland is a party. Questions about Sadurski's case have been raised in the European Parliament and Dutch Parliament. The Human Rights Institute of the International Bar Association also called for charges against Sadurski to be dropped. Former Australian High Court judge Michael Kirby commented: "Poland’s citizens, including Professor Sadurski, must always have the ability to criticise the government without fear of retribution or imprisonment." Scholars at Risk characterizes the prosecution of Sadurski as "apparent retaliation for the peaceful exercise of the right to freedom of expression" and states that state crackdowns on free expression cause "a chilling effect on academic freedom and undermine democratic society generally".

== Works ==
- Sadurski, Wojciech (1980). Neoliberalny system wartości politycznych (in Polish). Państwowe Wydawn. Naukowe. ISBN 978-83-01-01545-9.
- Sadurski, Wojciech (1985). Giving Desert Its Due: Social Justice and Legal Theory. Springer Science & Business Media. ISBN 978-90-277-1941-6.
- Sadurski, Wojciech (1989). Moral Pluralism and Legal Neutrality. Springer Science & Business Media. ISBN 978-0-7923-0565-1.
- Sadurski, Wojciech (2014) [1999]. Freedom of Speech and Its Limits. Springer. ISBN 978-94-010-9342-2.
- Sadurski, Wojciech (2014) [2005]. Rights Before Courts: A Study of Constitutional Courts in Postcommunist States of Central and Eastern Europe. Springer. ISBN 978-94-017-8935-6.
- Sadurski, Wojciech, ed. (2006). Political Rights Under Stress in 21st Century Europe. Oxford University Press. ISBN 978-0-19-929602-6.
- Sadurski, Wojciech (2012). Constitutionalism and the Enlargement of Europe. Oxford University Press. ISBN 978-0-19-969678-9.
- Sadurski, Wojciech (2019). Poland's Constitutional Breakdown. Oxford University Press. ISBN 978-0-19-884050-3.
- Sadurski, Wojciech (2022). A Pandemic of Populists. Cambridge University Press. ISBN 978-1-009-22453-6 (paperback) 978-1-009-22450-5 (hardback).
- Sadurski, Wojciech (2022). Demokracja na czarną godzinę [“Democracy for Dark Times”, in Polish], Wyd. Austeria, Kraków 2022, ISBN 978-83-7866-426-0,
- Sadurski Wojciech (2023). Constitutional Public Reason. Oxford University Press . ISBN 978-0-19-286967-8
- Sadurski, Wojciech. (2025). La minaccia populista alla democrazia [Populism’s Menace to Democracy, in Italian] (Il Mulino, Bologna 2025). ISBN 978-88-15-39186-5,
