= Current Issues in Criminal Justice =

- Discipline: Law Criminology
- Language: English

Publication details
- History: 1989–present
- Publisher: Sydney Institute of Criminology (Australia)
- Frequency: Quarterly

Standard abbreviations
- ISO 4: Curr. Issues Crim. Justice

Links
- Journal homepage

Published since 1989, Current Issues in Criminal Justice is the peer-reviewed law journal of the Sydney Institute of Criminology at the university of Sydney Law School.

Current Issues in Criminal Justice provides critical analysis and discussion of crime and justice issues. The Journal welcomes quality submissions from local and international academics, policy makers and justice professionals. Submissions are assessed on the degree to which they contribute to new knowledge, the extent to which they develop understanding of crime and justice issues, and the overall quality and presentation of the argument made. The Journal features full-length articles (8000 words including references) 'Contemporary Comments' – discussions at the cutting edge of the crime and justice debate (5000 words including references) – and reviews of recently published books.

The institute acknowledges the ongoing support from the Paul Byrne Memorial Fund in publishing the journal.
