= Patrick Desmond Fitzgerald Murray =

English-born Australian zoologist

- Born: 18 June 1900; Dorchester, Dorset, England
- Died: 17 May 1967 (aged 66); At sea
- Occupation: Zoologist

Patrick Desmond Fitzgerald Murray DSc FAA (18 June 1900 – 17 May 1967), also known as P. D. F. Murray, was an English-born Australian zoologist. He held the Challis Chair of Zoology from 1949 to 1960.

== Early life ==
Murray was born on 18 June 1900 in Dorchester, Dorset, England to Sybil Maud (née Jenkins) and John Hubert Plunkett Murray. His father, John, was at the time in the British Army and later became the Lieutenant-Governor of Territory of Papua. He attended Saint Ignatius' College and then went to the University of Sydney where he received both his baccalaureate and his doctorate. He also received a baccalaureate from Magdalen College, Oxford.

== Career ==
Murray's career started upon his return to Sydney in 1924. He was appointed as a Macleay fellow at the Linnean Society of New South Wales. He was also made a lecturer at the University of Sydney. In 1936, Murray was appointed as a demonstrator at Bedford College. In 1939, he became a reader in biology and comparative anatomy at Barts. In 1949, he was appointed as Challis Chair of Zoology at the University of Sydney and held the position until he resigned due to illness. In 1960, he moved to University of New England to allow himself to focus more on zoology than administrative work and also to reduce stress to not worsen his health. He held that position until retiring in 1966; upon his retirement from the university, he was named an honorary research fellow.

His research largely focused on embryology and morphogenesis in a lab setting. His work at the University of Sydney largely focused around how different parts of chick embryos develop. Specifically, his work focused on the development of single somites, which develop early in embryonic development. He also focused on unsegmented mesoderms and the skeletal development of chicks in the embryonic stage. He accomplished this by using chorioallantonic grafts, which became a signature part of the later work in his career. His work after leaving from the University of Sydney was focused around the development of the heart in the embryonic stages of a chick.

== Personal life ==
Murray had no children. Murray had two marriages. His first was to Margery Holland with the wedding in 1925 and ending in 1966 with a dissolution. Later in 1966, he married Jascha Ann Morgan, a university lecturer. He died at sea on 17 May 1967 on board the Achille Lauro en route to Strangeways Laboratory in Cambridge.

Murray was a largely private person; however, he did oppose the Communist Party Dissolution Bill 1950 and was in opposition to nuclear weapons.
