= Ron McCallum =

Australian legal academic

Ronald Clive McCallum AO (born 8 October 1948) is an Australian legal academic. He is an expert in labour law, and has served as a professor and dean of law at the University of Sydney. He is the first totally blind person to be appointed to a full professorship in any subject at any university in Australia or New Zealand, as well as the first to become a Dean of Law in these countries. He chaired the United Nations Committee on the Rights of Persons with Disabilities in Geneva.

== Early life ==
Ron McCallum was born in Melbourne, ten weeks premature and weighing only three pounds. At the time, treating this prematurity was treated by placing the baby in a humidicrib with uncontrolled supplemental oxygen; while this treatment prevented McCallum from dying, it meant that he permanently lost his sight.He was diagnosed with retrolental fibroplasia.

His father, Patrick McCallum, who had post-traumatic stress due to his experiences in World War II, died during McCallum's childhood. He was raised by his mother, Edna McCallum, along with his two brothers in the Melbourne suburb of Hampton, in relatively poor conditions.

=== Education ===
He attended schools for the blind, where it became apparent that he was intellectually gifted.

His last four years of schooling were spent at St Bede's College in Mentone. The only member of his family to finish Year 12, McCallum achieved outstanding results, and was accepted to study law at Monash University. Though he had originally planned to be a history teacher, he was encouraged by his mother to try law for a year. He studied via other students reading aloud to him or by listening to tapes.

While at university, McCallum studied labour law. He has said that, within the first few weeks of the course, "suddenly the law made sense and my life made sense". He graduated from Monash Law School with a Bachelor of Jurisprudence in 1970, and a Bachelor of Laws in 1972. He later pursued graduate studies in Canada at the Queen's University Faculty of Law, earning his LL.M. in 1974.

== Career ==
=== Academia ===
Upon graduating, he went into academia, becoming a law lecturer at Monash. He became increasingly well known for his work on labour law, and has published 10 books on the topic, as well as numerous chapters, journal articles and papers. He was invited to teach at Osgoode Hall Law School in Canada and Duke University in the United States. While in North America, he was appointed to the National Academy of Arbitrators. In this role, he has participated in five worldwide comparative labour law studies which have been published in what is now titled the Comparative Labour Law and Policy Journal.

In January 1993, he was appointed the foundation Blake Dawson Waldron Professor of Industrial Law at Sydney University. Nine years later, he commenced a five-year term as Dean of Law. McCallum is the first totally blind person to be appointed by any university in Australasia to a full professorship in any field or as Dean of Law.

McCallum is the inaugural president of the Australian Labour Law Association, and the Asian regional vice-president of the International Society for Labour and Social Security Law. He has also done extensive work for the blind as the Chair of Radio for the Print Handicapped of New South Wales Co-operative Ltd, a company that operates radio 2RPH, which reads newspapers and magazines for blind and for other print disabled listeners over the air. Since 2006, he has been a member of the Board of Vision Australia Pty Ltd. He has received a Centenary Medal for his work, and in 2006 was made an Officer in the Order of Australia.

McCallum made headlines in 2005 by his criticism of John Howard's government's WorkChoices legislation, a policy he claimed was fundamentally flawed.

McCallum retired from his position as Dean of Sydney Law School in 2007. However he has continued working at the Law School in his position of Professor of Labour Law.

=== Later career ===
Ron was on the Board of the former Royal Blind Society, and on the Board of Radio 2RPH, of which he was its chair from 2003 to 2011. Ron has served on the Board of Vision Australia since 2006, predominantly as deputy chair.

In 2008, McCallum was elected to the first Committee on the Rights of Persons with Disabilities of the United Nations which monitors compliance with the Convention on the Rights of Persons with Disabilities. In February 2009, he was appointed inaugural Rapporteur to the Convention and in October was elected chair of the committee. He was reelected to the Committee in 2010 and remains as chair.

McCallum has been a Don't DIS my ABILITY ambassador for four years.

On 7 December 2010, McCallum commenced his consultancy at HWL Ebsworth.

On 20 December 2011, McCallum was announced, along with Reserve Bank Board Member John Edwards and former Federal Court Judge Michael Moore, to conduct an official review of the Fair Work Act 2009 (Cth).

In 2013, McCallum also became an ambassador for European NGO confederation, LIGHT FOR THE WORLD.

In 2017, McCallum appeared alongside Matt Formston on the Season 2 premiere episode of You Can't Ask That entitled "Blind People".

In 2019, McCallum published a book titled Born at the Right Time. The book details his life's story and how advancements in technology helped him reach heights previously impossible for blind people.

== Honours ==
On 25 January 2011, he was declared the 2011 Senior Australian of the Year. In 2014, he won the Henry Viscardi Achievement Awards.

== Personal life ==
At age 37, McCallum married Mary Crock, a B.A., LL.B., and PhD (Law) graduate of the University of Melbourne and its law school and now Professor of Law at the University of Sydney. They have two sons (Gerard McCallum and Daniel Clive McCallum) and a daughter (Kathryn McCallum).

McCallum's hobbies include playing the flute, reading, cooking, and meditation. McCallum is a practicing Christian.

In 2019 a memoir dealing with his life and work was published by Allen & Unwin, titled Born at the right time.
