= Amy Mack =

Australian journalist, writer and editor (1876-1939)

Amy Eleanor Mack
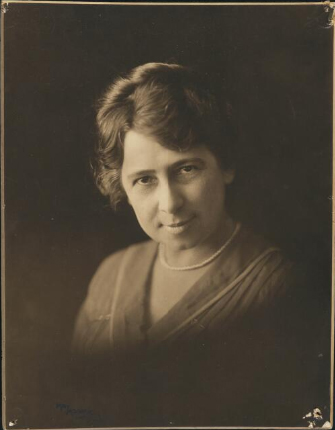
- Born: 6 June 1876; Port Adelaide, Australia
- Died: 4 November 1939 (aged 63); Sydney
- Occupations: Journalist, writer
- Spouse: Launcelot Harrison
- Relatives: Louise Mack
- Writing career
- Language: English
- Genre: Novel
- Notable works: Bushland stories (1910), Scribbling Sue (1914)

Amy Eleanor Mack (6 June 1876, Port Adelaide – 4 November 1939, Sydney), also known as Amy Eleanor Harrison and Mrs. Launcelot Harrison, was an Australian writer, journalist, and editor. She was honorary secretary of the National Council of Women of New South Wales. She is best known as a children's author of such books as Bushland stories (1910) and Scribbling Sue (1914) and others, as well as a journalist and an editor of Sydney Morning Herald.

== Life ==
Amy Eleanor Mack was born on 6 June 1876 in Port Adelaide and was one of thirteen children in the family. Her father, Rev. Hans Hamilton Mack was a Wesleyan minister from Downpatrick, Ireland, and her mother Jemima, née James, was from Armagh. Due to his work her father was required to move every three years, therefore the family lived in various places in South Australia and New South Wales. They left South Australia in 1878, then spent three years at Morpeth and Windsor, New South Wales, and finally settled in Sydney in 1882. Mack was educated at the Sydney Girls High School. Her older sister Louise and younger sister Gertude were also writers.

Mack married Professor Launcelot Harrison on 29 February 1908. The couple did not have children. In 1914 they moved to London where Harrison did postgraduate work at Cambridge. During World War I Mack's husband served in the Middle East while she moved to London. In 1919 the Harrisons returned to Australia and lived in Gordon, New South Wales. Between 1920 and 1923 Mack was an honorary secretary of the National Council of Women of New South Wales. She was also the first woman on the council of the Institute of Journalists in New South Wales and the only woman ever elected as vice-president of the institute.

Amy Eleanor Mack died of arteriosclerosis on 4 November 1939 in St. Vincent's Hospital in Sydney and was cremated with Presbyterian forms.

== Work ==
Soon after graduating from Sydney Girls High School Mack started working as a freelance journalist. In 1907 she became an editor of the 'Women's Page' of the Sydney Morning Herald and remained in this position till 1914. In 1909 Mack published her first book, A Bush Calendar, that consisted of her nature articles that previously appeared in the Sydney Morning Herald.

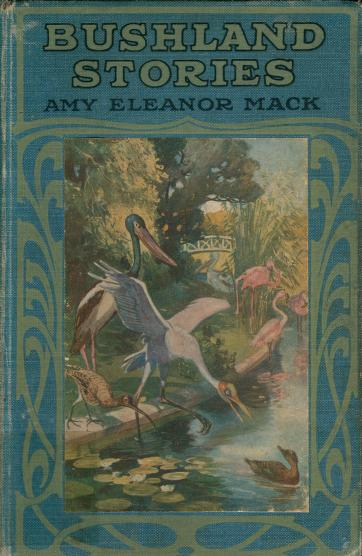
Bushland Stories by Amy Mack, 1910

In 1910, Mack published three collections of short stories for children: Waterside Stories, Birdland Stories and Bushland Stories. These stories were adopted for supplementary reading in primary schools and were considered the best of their kind produced in Australia by that time. Though the publisher was not sure about the success of the children's books and produced them economically with no illustrations, Mack's books found an immediate audience within the schools where nature studies had been recently added to the primary school curriculum. Bushland Stories became so popular that it was reprinted eleven times by 1940.

In 1911, the book Bush Days, another collection of Mack's essays for adults from the Sydney Morning Herald, was published. In 1914 she published a children's book Scribbling Sue that became as popular as Bushland Stories, and 80,000 copies of both books were sold by 1930. In 1916 and 1917 Mack worked in London in the Ministry of Munitions as a public relations officer for the welfare section. After that she was a publicity officer for the Ministry of Food in London. In 1922 Mack published another book for adults, The Wilderness.

After her husband died in 1928 Mack continued to publish occasional articles.

Mack's books can be found in libraries throughout the world, including the National Library of Australia, the New York Public Library, the British Library and others.

== Books ==
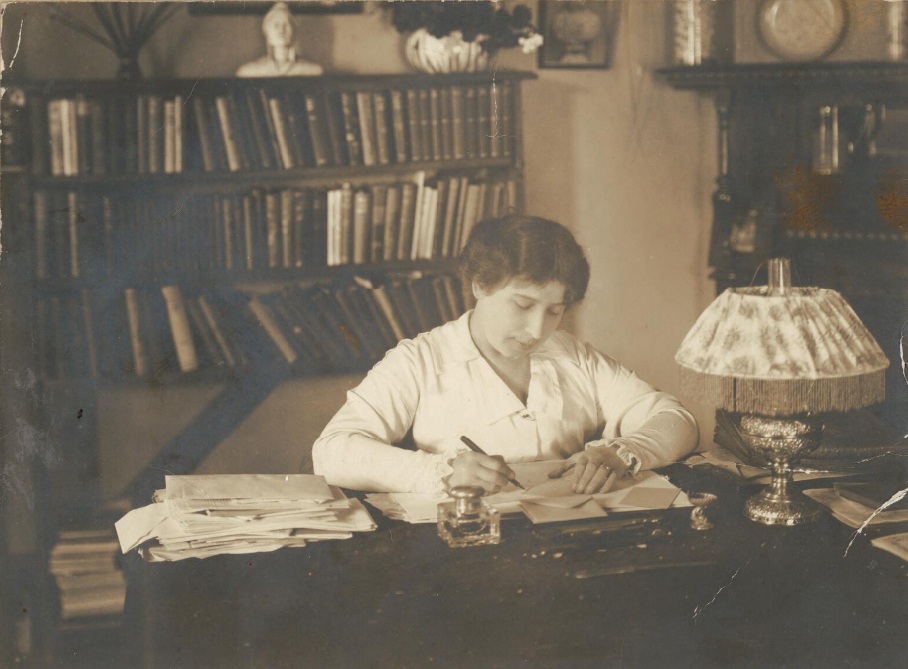
Amy Mack in the 1910s

- A Bush Calendar (1909)
- Bushland Stories (1910, volume 1)
- Birdland Stories (1910, volume 2)
- Waterside Stories (1910, volume 3)
- Bush Days (1911)
- Scribbling Sue and Other Stories (1914)
- The Tom-Tit's Nest (1914)
- The Wilderness (1922)
- The Fantail's House (1928, volume 1)
- The Gum Leaf That Flew: And Other Stories of the Australian Bushland (1928, volume 2)
- Why the Spinebill's Beak is Long (1928, volume 3)
- The Little Black Duck (1928)
- The Flower Fairies (1928)
- The Bird's Concert (1928)
