= ITT International Fellowship Program =

The ITT International Fellowship Program was a program of grants promoting international educational student exchanges, similar to the Fulbright Program, sponsored by the International Telephone & Telegraph Corporation. The program was administered by the Institute of International Education from 1973 until the mid-1980s.

== History ==
Between 1973 and 1982, 498 students received ITT fellowships: 244 American students who went abroad for a year of study, and 254 non-US students who came to the US, usually to pursue a master's degree. Graduate students were also awarded this fellowship from 1983-1986. During this time, the fellowship was administered in conjunction with the Fulbright Program. It was considered especially prestigious at the time, because it provided students with more funding than the Fulbright Program.

=== Notable alumni ===
- Madeleine Mitchell, violinist
- Richard Francis-Jones, Australian architect
- David France, author and football historian
- Deborah Scroggins, author and journalist
- Martin S. Flaherty, Director The Leitner Center for International Law and Justice
- Paolo Mancosu, philosopher
