= Challis Professorship =

Professorship at the University of Sydney

The Challis Professorship are professorships at the University of Sydney named in honour of John Henry Challis, an Anglo-Australian merchant, landowner and philanthropist, whose bequests to the University of Sydney allowed for their establishment.

In 1880, Challis bequeathed residuary real and personal estate to the University, "to be applied for the benefit of that Institution in such manner as the governing body thereof shall direct". From the income of the Fund a sum of £7,500 was applied for the payment of half the cost of the erection of a new Chemical Laboratory, and a further sum of £1,900 devoted to the erection of a marble statue of Challis, which was placed in the university's Great Hall. The Challis appointments were then created.

== Holders ==
=== English ===
- John Le Gay Brereton (1921-1933)
- A. J. A. Waldock (1934–50)
- Wesley Milgate (1951–61)
- Sam L. Goldberg (1963–66)
- Gerry Wilkes (1966–96)
- Margaret Harris (2006–07)
- Paul Giles (2010–)

=== Philosophy ===
- Francis Anderson (1890-1921)
- Bernard Muscio (1922-1926)
- John Anderson (1927-1958)
- J. L. Mackie (1959-1963)
- David Malet Armstrong (1964-1991)
- Keith Campbell
- Huw Price (2002-2012)
- Moira Gatens (2012-2021)
- Paul E. Griffiths (2022-2024)
- Kristie Miller (2024-)

=== History ===
- George Arnold Wood (1891-1928)
- Stephen Henry Roberts (1929-1947?)
- John Manning Ward (1948-1979)
- Deryck M. Schreuder (1980-1992)
- Ros Pesman (2003?-2004)
- Stephen Garton (?2004-2009?)
- Shane White (?2010-2021?)
- Chris Hilliard (2022-)

=== Law ===
- Pitt Cobbett (1890-1909)
- John Peden (1910-1941)
- James Williams (1942-1946)
- Kenneth Owen Shatwell (1947-1974)
- William Loutit Morison (1982-1985)
- Ross Waite Parsons (1986)
- David Harland (1989-2001)
- Richard Vann (2002?-)

=== International Law and Jurisprudence (split) ===
This chair appears to have been the fourth of its kind in the English-speaking world. Its predecessors were the Regius Chair of Public Law and the Law of Nature and Nations at the University of Edinburgh; the Chair of Jurisprudence and the Law of Nations at UCL; and the Chair of Jurisprudence and International Law at Trinity College, Dublin. It was split after Stone's retirement into two separate chairs.

- Archibald Hamilton Charteris (1920-1940)
- Julius Stone (1942-1973)

=== International Law ===
- David Johnson (1976-1985)
- James Crawford (1986-1992)
- Ivan Shearer (1993-2003)
- Donald Rothwell (2004-2006)
- Gillian Triggs (2010-2012)
- Ben Saul (2016-)

=== Jurisprudence ===
- Alice Erh-Soon Tay (1975-2002)
- Wojciech Sadurski (2009- )

=== Anatomy ===
- James Thomas Wilson (1890-1920)
- John Irvine Hunter (1923-1924)
- Arthur Neville Burkitt (1926-1955)
- Neil William Macintosh (1955-1973)
- Michael J. Blunt (1973-1984)
- Jonathan Stone (1987-2003)

=== Biology ===
The chair was founded in 1899, but renamed in 1915 to Zoology when Botany was created as a separate chair. It returned to its original name in 1963.

- William Aitcheson Haswell (1890-1917)
- Launcelot Harrison (1922-1928)
- William John Dakin (1929-1948)
- Patrick Desmond Fitzgerald Murray (1949-1960)
- Charles Birch (1960-1983)
- Donald Thomas Anderson
- Norman Alan Walker (1992-1993)
- Ian Douglas Hume
- Ronald Anthony Skurray

=== Civil Engineering ===
- William Henry Warren (29 July 1889-?1925)
- Jack Roderick (1951-1978)
- Nicholas S. Trahair (1978-1998)
- John Carter (1999-2005?)
- Kim Rasmussen (2009- )

== See also ==
- List of University of Sydney people
