= Francis-Jones Morehen Thorp =

Australian design studio

Francis-Jones Carpenter (fjcstudio) is a multi-disciplinary Australian design studio established in 2002 and noted for design excellence and a commitment to enhancing the public realm. fjcstudio has a reputation as an ideas-driven practice "with an agenda for strong public engagement and masterful resolution of tectonics" and the firm's work demonstrates "an extraordinary ability to uncover the real and often contradictory issues and potentials of a project by a very careful analysis of purpose and place".

Led by design director Richard Francis-Jones, fjcstudio offers services in architecture, interior design, landscape architecture, urban design and Country/place.

On 3 April 2023 FJMT was renamed as Francis-Jones Carpenter, with two Studio Principals; Design Director, Richard Francis-Jones and Managing Principal, Elizabeth Carpenter.

== History ==
Fjcstudio originated in the Canberra-based practice of Mitchell/Giurgola & Thorp (MGT). In 2002, partners Richard Francis-Jones, Jeff Morehen and Richard Thorp established fjmt following a restructure of MGT Sydney. Richard Thorp retired from the partnership in 2009. The practice also established an office in Oxford, England.

In 2014, ORO Editions published a monograph of the studio's work titled Architecture as Material Culture.

== Philosophy ==
fjcstudio explored ideas of urban form and topographic placemaking, sustainable approaches to local climatic conditions, and tectonic expression. Adopting a collaborative approach, fjcstudio's carefully designed spaces respect their historical, natural and social contexts.

It is this sensitivity to place that “sets the work of fjmt apart... [it is] their particular commitment to the creation of urban form; one which is focused to an equal degree about the axial pathways of the pre-existing civic fabric and the topography of the attendant landscape.”

Working from a standpoint of architecture being “first and foremost a structural assembly and a craftwork of socio-cultural significance”, fjmt's work rejects fleeting notions of fashion and architecture-as-commodity. “…It is [the] commitment to an investment in time - to think, to reflect and to respond - that imbues fjmt’s projects with a sense of considered intent and positions the work as significant within the public realm.”

“Architecture does not move at speed, as any of us know who have tried to make architecture. Architecture is slow… [An] authentic contemporary architecture should not only attempt to somehow begin to reconcile humanity’s place in the world but also be directed towards rejuvenating, repoliticising our desiccated public realm. We should pursue an architecture appropriate to citizens rather than consumers.”

== Awards ==
fjcstudio is the only Australian firm to have won the World Building of the Year Award (once in 2013 for Auckland Art Gallery Toi o Tamaki and again in 2024 for the Darlington Public School in Sydney). It is also the only firm to have concurrently won the Greenway Award for Conservation and the Sir John Sulman Award for Outstanding Public Architecture (2005 for the Sydney Mint redevelopment). Other awards include:

- World Building of the Year Award 2013 and 2024 WAF
- World Office Building of the Year Award 2011 & 2014, WAF
- International Public Library of the Year 2014, Danish Agency for Culture
- International Award 2012, RIBA
- NZ Architecture Medal 2012, NZIA
- Sir Zelman Cowen Award for Public Architecture, 2000, AIA
- Jorn Utzon Award for International Architecture 2012, AIA
- Sir John Sulman Award for Outstanding Public Architecture 2005, AIA (NSW)
- Sir Arthur G Stephenson Award for Best Commercial Architecture 2013, AIA (NSW)
- John Verge Award for Interior Architecture 2010, 2015 AIA (NSW)
- Lloyd Rees Award for Excellence in Civic Design 2000 & 2013, AIA (NSW)
- Milo Dunphy Award for Sustainable Architecture 2010, 2013, AIA (NSW)
- Lachlan Macquarie Award for Heritage 2005, AIA
- Greenway Award for Conservation 2005, AIA
- Australia Award for Urban Design 2012, PIA
- City of Sydney Lord Mayor's Prize 2013, AIA (NSW)
- National Architecture Award for Public Architecture 2010, AIA
- National Architecture Award for Sustainable Architecture 2010, AIA

== Notable projects ==
- Auckland Art Gallery Toi o Tamaki
- Bankstown Library and Knowledge Centre, Sydney
- Bayside Police Station, Sandringham
- Charles Perkins Centre, University of Sydney
- Craigieburn Library, Melbourne
- Darling Quarter, Sydney
- John Niland Scientia, UNSW
- Liberty Place, Sydney
- Mark Wainwright Analytical Centre (MWAC), UNSW
- Max Webber Library, Blacktown
- New Law School building, University of Sydney
- Owen G Glenn Building, University of Auckland
- The Red Centre, UNSW
- St Barnabas Anglican Church, Broadway, Sydney
- Sugardock, Pyrmont, Sydney
- Surry Hills Library & Community Centre, Sydney
- Sydney Harbour Moving Image Centre, Circular Quay (unbuilt)
- Sydney Mint redevelopment
- Tyree Energy Technologies Building, UNSW
- UTS Central, University of Technology Sydney
- Wolfson Building, John Radcliffe Hospital, Oxford, England
