= Stephen Henry Roberts =

Sir Stephen Henry Roberts CMG
- Born: 16 February 1901; Maldon, Victoria, Australia
- Died: 1971 (aged 69–70)
- Occupations: Academic; historian; author
- Awards: See Honours section

Sir Stephen Henry Roberts CMG (16 February 1901 in Maldon, Victoria – 17 March 1971) was an Australian academic, writer, historian, international analyst, and university vice-chancellor.

== Early life and education ==
Roberts was born into a working-class background, the son of French-born parents. His father Christopher Roberts was a miner of Cornish descent, his mother Doris Elsie Whillemina, née Wagener, of German. He attended Castlemaine High School and Melbourne Teachers' College before winning a scholarship to the University of Melbourne, where in 1921 he was awarded a Bachelor of Arts, in 1923 a Master of Arts, and in 1930 and a Doctor of Letters. He had studied in the history department of Professor Sir Ernest Scott, and after graduating with first-class honours won Wyselaskie scholarships in English constitutional history and political economy, and the Dwight prize in sociology.

== Early academic career ==
Roberts was appointed assistant lecturer and tutor in British history. His master's degree had involved original research into Australia's pioneering history, published in 1924 as History of Australian Land Settlement, 1788–1920. In 1925 he attended the first conference sponsored by the Institute of Pacific Relations, in Honolulu, where he presented a paper on Australia's role in a changing Pacific; this was published in 1927 under the title Population Problems in the Pacific.

He won a Harbison-Higinbotham research scholarship in 1929 from the University of London, where he studied at the London School of Economics. Here he was taught by Harold Laski and Lillian Knowles, and chose French colonial policy from the 1870s to the 1920s as his dissertation topic, carrying out much of the archival work in Paris.

Roberts married Thelma Asche in Paddington, London in 1927, after which he returned to Melbourne as a research fellow at Melbourne University. In 1929 he successfully applied for the Challis Chair of History at the University of Sydney succeeding Professor G. A. Wood.

Roberts' original research over eight years led to the publication of six books. In 1929 his doctoral thesis became a two-volume History of French Colonial Policy (1870–1925). This was followed in 1932 by his text for schools, Modern British History, co-written with C. H. Currey, and in 1933 the History of Modern Europe. His 1935 book Australia and the Far East concerned international studies, after which he returned to Australian history with The Squatting Age in Australia, 1835–1847. His interpretations in these works became standard and the focus for debate in their fields.

== Attitudes to history teaching ==
Intellectually Roberts was a utilitarian who attracted other like thinkers in what became the 'Sydney school'. This school of thought espoused the importance of rigorous application of data and was critical of a romantic view of the past.

After World War II Roberts developed American studies. He had advanced breadth in the teaching of history, and in 1938 helped formulate school curriculum and history papers to his own world view as a member of the Board of Secondary School Studies. His History of Modern Europe became a core textbook. Roberts became a member of the Mitchell Library committee and trustee of the State Library of New South Wales.

== Popular writer and broadcaster ==
In the 1930s Roberts became an international analyst and public lecturer, and wrote for The Sydney Morning Herald on diplomatic and political matters; later during World War II, he was the newspaper's war correspondent. He was also associated with the Australian Institute of International Affairs, the Sydney group of the Round Table, and the Institute of Pacific Relations.

His "Notes on the News" was presented on ABC from 1932. After the war, his public roles took precedence over his research and precluded the writing of further histories.

Roberts had met Nazi leaders and attended their rallies, which in 1937, with his knowledge of Central European history, led to his most noted book, The House That Hitler Built. This brought to light Hitler's Reich and the persecution of the Jews and forewarned of a probable world war. The book, addressed to the ordinary reader, was translated into other languages and frequently reprinted. It was read with admiration by British Prime Minister Neville Chamberlain, but he disagreed with Roberts' conclusions. He wrote after finishing the book: "If I accepted the author's conclusions, I should despair, but I don't and won't". Horace Rumbold, who had been the British Ambassador to Germany from 1928 to 1933, sent the British government minister, Lord Halifax, a copy of The House That Hitler Built in November 1937, shortly before Halifax's meeting with Hitler. Rumbold explained to his son, "It contains an admirable character sketch of Hitler. I thought it just as well that Halifax should realise the sort of man he was dealing with".

== Later academic career ==
In 1946 Roberts became Acting Vice-Chancellor of the University of Sydney, the full post confirmed in 1947. In 1955 he became the university's principal. He chaired the Australian Vice-Chancellors' Committee in 1952–53. While principal he called for financial backing for university foundations from leaders of commerce, industry and public life. The success of these appeals enabled the university to be promoted abroad.

He developed and expanded the University of Sydney after post-war austerity ended, and oversaw a building programme extension into Darlington. This development was aided by Sir Keith Murray's 1957 Committee on Australian Universities with concomitant funding from the Australian government.

Roberts gave support to the training of Pacific Islanders and Papua New Guineans in Sydney's medical faculty, while he celebrated Charles Perkins as the first Aborigine to graduate with a degree.

From 1952 he chaired the New South Wales State Cancer Council.

Having transformed the University of Sydney into a modern institution of more than 16,000 students, in 1967 Roberts retired, leaving Sydney with new faculties and increased research capacity. His archives hold his notes for major work on The Mind of France. The project remained unfinished.

== Death ==
Roberts died as a consequence of heart disease in March 1971 on board ship near Port Melbourne, while travelling to Europe with his wife.

== Honours ==
- 1948: Honorary doctorate, University of Bristol, England
- 1953: Honorary doctorate, Durham University, England
- 1956: Honorary doctorate, University of British Columbia, Canada
- 1956: Companion of the Order of St Michael and St George (CMG), Great Britain
- 1957: Honorary doctorate, University of New England, Australia
- 1958: Honorary doctorate, McGill University, Canada
- 1960: Commander of the Order of the Dannebrog, Denmark
- 1961: National Order of the Cedar, Lebanon
- 1964: Order of the Phoenix, Greece
- 1965: Knight Bachelor
- 1967: Order of Merit, Italy
- 1967: Legion of Honour, France
- 1968: Honorary doctorate, University of Sydney, Australia

== Selected bibliography ==
- Wood D. R. V. (1986) Stephen Henry Roberts, Historian and Vice-Chancellor, University of Sydney ISBN 0-949269-21-2
- Schreuder D.M. (1992) "A Second Foundation: S. H. Roberts as Challis Professor 1929–47" in History at Sydney, 1891–1991, editor B. Caine. University of Sydney
- Schreuder D.M. (1995) "An Unconventional Founder" in The Discovery of Australian History, 1890–1939, editors S. Macintyre and J. Thomas, University of Melbourne
- Connell W. F. (1995) Australia's First, vol 2, University of Sydney
- Walsh G. (1970) Australia: History and Historians, University of Canberra
- Gazette, University of Sydney, May 1967, p 193
- Australian Journal of Politics and History, 46, no 1, 2000, p 1
- Sydney Morning Herald: 10 April 1929, 8 September 1932, 5 March 1937, 6 July 1949, 2 January 1956, 5 October 1963, 1 January 1965, 31 August 1967, 26 January 1968, 20 March 1971
- Roberts papers, University of Sydney Archives
- R. M. Crawford papers, University of Melbourne Archives
- E. Scott papers, National Library of Australia
