= John Street (Australian politician) =

Australian politician (1832–1891)

The Honourable John Street
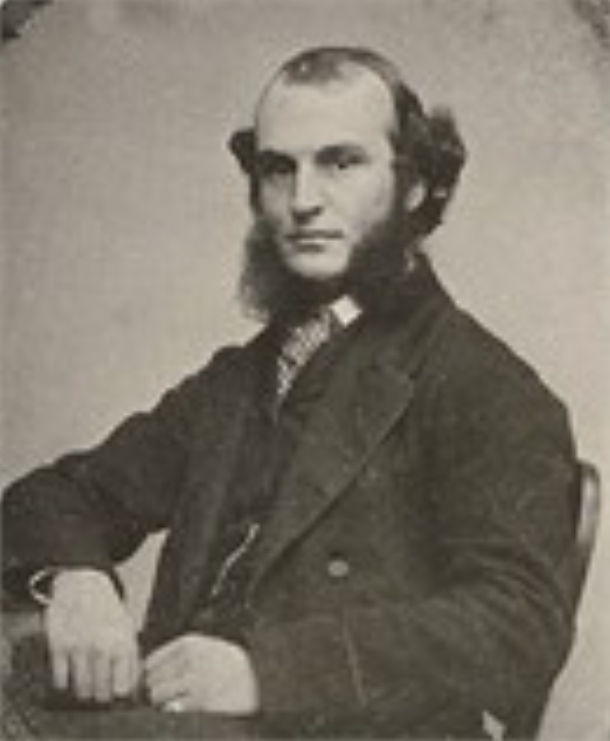

Member of Legislative Assembly of New South Wales for East Sydney
- In office 5 February 1887 – 23 March 1891

Personal details
- Born: John Rendell Street; 19 October 1832 Bathurst, New South Wales, Australia
- Died: 23 March 1891 (aged 58) Elizabeth Bay, New South Wales, Australia
- Party: Free Trade Party
- Relations: Thomas Smith (brother-in-law)
- Children: Sir Philip Street
- Relatives: Street family

John Rendell Street, MLA (19 October 1832 – 23 March 1891) was an Australian politician. In 1886, he founded the Perpetual Trustee Company with fellow trustees Edmund Barton and James Fairfax. He succeeded Edmund Barton as Prime Minister in his New South Wales Legislative Assembly seat of East Sydney.

He was a partner in the law firm Allen, Street & Norton, and a director of the Colonial Mutual Life Assurance Company, and a vice president of Sydney Hospital. He married Susanna Caroline Lawson, the granddaughter of British explorer William Lawson, who pioneered the first settler crossing of the Blue Mountains in 1813, along with William Wentworth and Gregory Blaxland. By his wife Susanna, he was the patriarch of Australia's Street family. He served as a member of the New South Wales Legislative Assembly from 1887 until his death.

== Early years ==
John Rendell Street was born at a property known as Woodlands, near Bathurst, New South Wales, Australia. He was the son of John Street, JP and Maria Street (née Wood).

His father descended from the brother of Sir Thomas Street (1625–1696), who was an English Chief Justice, and a judge of the last King's Bench before the Glorious Revolution of 1688. Sir Thomas' father George Street (1594–1643) was the Mayor of Worcester, and his grandfather John Street (d. 1622) was an alderman of Worcester, and his great-grandfather Francis Streate (d. 1607) was a Member of Parliament for Worcester. Sir Thomas' father George was a cousin of John Street (1584–1633), who in 1605 killed two of the Gunpowder Plot conspirators and was rewarded with a pension "for that extraordinary service performed in killing those two traitors, Piercie and Catesbie, with two bulletts at one shott out of his muskett." Both of his parents were English émigrés to Australia via the 1822 passenger ship Thalia.

== Later years ==
Street was a partner in the law firm Allen, Street & Norton. In 1886, he founded the Perpetual Trustee Company as managing director with Edmund Barton and James Fairfax as fellow trustees. He was a director of the Colonial Mutual Life Assurance Company, and a vice president of Sydney Hospital. In 1887, he was elected to the New South Wales Legislative Assembly as a Free Trade member for East Sydney, a position he held until his death.

On 4 December 1860, Street married Susanna Caroline Lawson, the granddaughter of Australian explorer William Lawson, who pioneered the first successful crossing of the Blue Mountains by British colonists, along with Gregory Blaxland and William Wentworth. Street's brother-in-law via his sister Sarah Maria was Australian politician Thomas Whistler Smith, who was the deputy chairman of the Commercial Banking Company of Sydney (now National Australia Bank), and who was the nephew of Australian politician Henry Smith, who was the chairman of the Commercial Banking Company of Sydney.

== Legacy ==
Street had seven children with his wife Susanna. Their eldest son was Sir Philip Whistler Street, who went on to become Chief Justice of the Supreme Court of New South Wales and Lieutenant-Governor of New South Wales, as did their grandson Lieutenant Colonel Sir Kenneth Whistler Street, and as did their great-grandson Commander Sir Laurence Whistler Street. Street's third son Ernest married Emma Browne, who was the daughter of Australian police magistrate and author Commissioner Thomas Alexander Browne.

Sir Kenneth married Jessie Mary Grey (née Lillingston), Lady Street, who served as Australia's first female delegate to the United Nations, and as the first Vice President of the United Nations Commission on the Status of Women, and who was the daughter of Charles Alfred Gordon Lillingston, JP, an Imperial Civil Service officer, and Mabel Harriet Ogilvie, who was the daughter of Australian politician Edward David Stuart Ogilvie and Theodosia de Burgh. Sir Kenneth and Jessie had four children. Their daughter Philippa married Australian Test cricketer Jack Fingleton, OBE, who was the son of Australian politician James Fingleton. Their son Sir Laurence married Susan Gai (née Watt; formerly Lady Street), AM, who served as the first female chair of the Eastern Sydney Health Service, and who was the niece of pioneering Australian aviator Lieutenant Colonel Walter "Toby" Oswald Watt, OBE, and the granddaughter of Australian politician John Brown Watt, and the great-granddaughter of Australian politician George Kenyon Holden. Sir Laurence's son Commander Alexander "Sandy" Street, SC, served as an Australian federal judge, and as an officer of the Royal Australian Naval Reserve. Sir Laurence's daughter Lieutenant Commander Sylvia Emmett (née Street), AM served as an Australian federal judge, and as an officer of the Royal Australian Naval Reserve, and she is married to Australian federal judge Arthur Emmett, AO, KC, who is the Challis Lecturer Professor in Roman Law at Sydney Law School. Sylvia and Arthur's son James Emmett, SC serves as a judge of the Supreme Court of New South Wales.

New South Wales Legislative Assembly
Preceded by Edmund Barton; Henry Copeland	Member for East Sydney; 1887–1891; Served alongside: Sydney Burdekin, William McMillan, George Reid	Succeeded by Walter Bradley
