= Street family =

Australian dynasty

Street
- Current region: Australia
- Members: John Street; Philip Street; Kenneth Street; Jessie Street (née Lillingston); Laurence Street; Geoffrey Street; Anthony Street; Sylvia Emmett (née Street); Alexander Street
- Connected members: William Lawson; Edward Ogilvie; John Watt; George Holden; Thomas Browne; Thomas Smith; James Fingleton; Jack Fingleton; Arthur Emmett; James Emmett

The Street family is an Australian family. Their patriarch was Australian politician John Street. John's son Sir Philip Street, grandson Lieutenant Colonel Sir Kenneth Street, and great-grandson Commander Sir Laurence Street each served as Chief Justice of the Supreme Court of New South Wales and Lieutenant-Governor of New South Wales. Sir Kenneth's wife Lady "Red Jessie" Street served as Australia's first female delegate to the United Nations, and she served as the first Vice President of the United Nations Commission on the Status of Women. Sir Kenneth's brother Lieutenant Laurence Street died fighting at Gallipoli in the First World War, and his cousin Brigadier Geoffrey Street was awarded a Military Cross for his courage in fighting at Gallipoli in the First World War, and then Geoffrey died while serving as Minister for Defence in the Second World War in the 1940 Canberra air disaster, along with two other federal cabinet ministers and the head of the Australian Army. Geoffrey's son Anthony "Tony" Street succeeded him in his federal seat, and he served as Minister of Foreign Affairs. Sir Laurence's son Commander Alexander "Sandy" Street, daughter Lieutenant Commander Sylvia Emmett (née Street), and son-in-law Professor Arthur Emmett served as federal judges, and Sylvia and Arthur's son James Emmett serves as a judge of the Supreme Court of New South Wales.

== Origins ==
John Rendell Street, MLA (1832–1891) was an Australian politician. He was the son of Maria Wood and John Street, JP, who descended from the brother of Sir Thomas Street (1625–1696), who was an English Chief Justice, and a judge of the last King's Bench before the Glorious Revolution of 1688. Sir Thomas' father George Street (1594–1643) served as the Mayor of Worcester, and his grandfather John Street (d. 1622) served as an alderman of Worcester, and his great-grandfather Francis Streate, MP (d. 1607) served as a Member of Parliament for Worcester. Sir Thomas' father George was a cousin of John Street (1584–1633), who in 1605 killed two of the Gunpowder Plot conspirators and was rewarded with a pension "for that extraordinary service performed in killing those two traitors, Piercie and Catesbie, with two bulletts at one shott out of his muskett."

John's parents emigrated to Australia from England aboard the ship Thalia in 1822. In 1886, John founded the Perpetual Trustee Company with fellow trustees Edmund Barton and James Fairfax. He succeeded Edmund Barton, Australia's first Prime Minister, in his New South Wales Legislative Assembly seat of East Sydney, and he married Susanna Lawson, the granddaughter of British explorer Commandant William Lawson, who pioneered the first successful crossing of the Blue Mountains by British colonists, along with William Wentworth and Gregory Blaxland, and they discovered inland pastures that fuelled the colony's economic growth thereafter. John and Susanna had seven children, including Philip and Ernest, who married Emma Browne, the daughter of Australian police magistrate Thomas Alexander Browne. John was a director of the Colonial Mutual Life Assurance Company. His sister Sarah Maria Street married Australian politician Thomas Whistler Smith, who was the deputy chairman of the Commercial Banking Company of Sydney, and who was the nephew of Australian politician Henry Gilbert Smith, who was the chairman of the Commercial Banking Company of Sydney.

== Sir Philip Whistler Street's generation ==
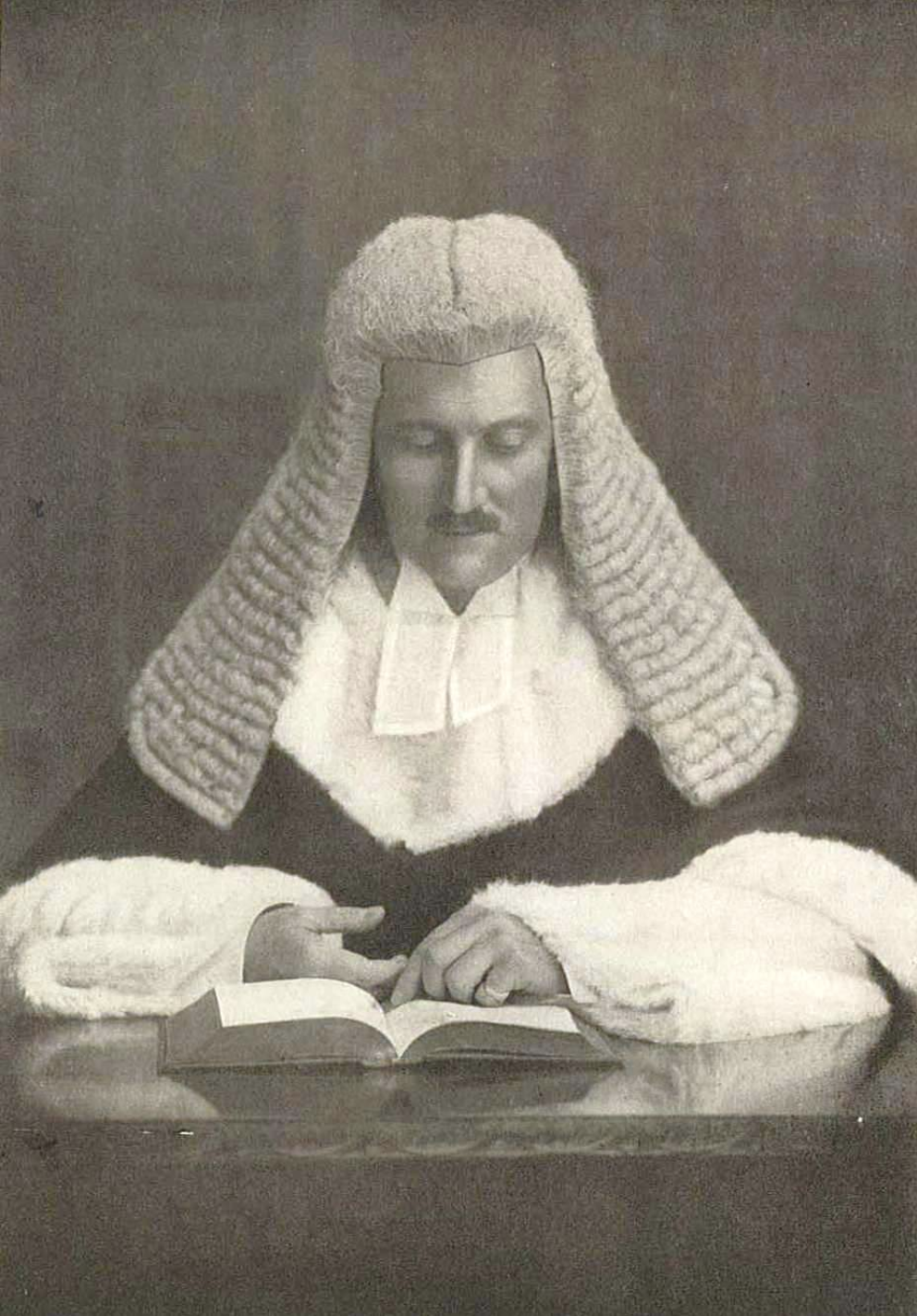
Sir Philip Street, 8th Chief Justice of the Supreme Court of New South Wales and Lieutenant-Governor of New South Wales

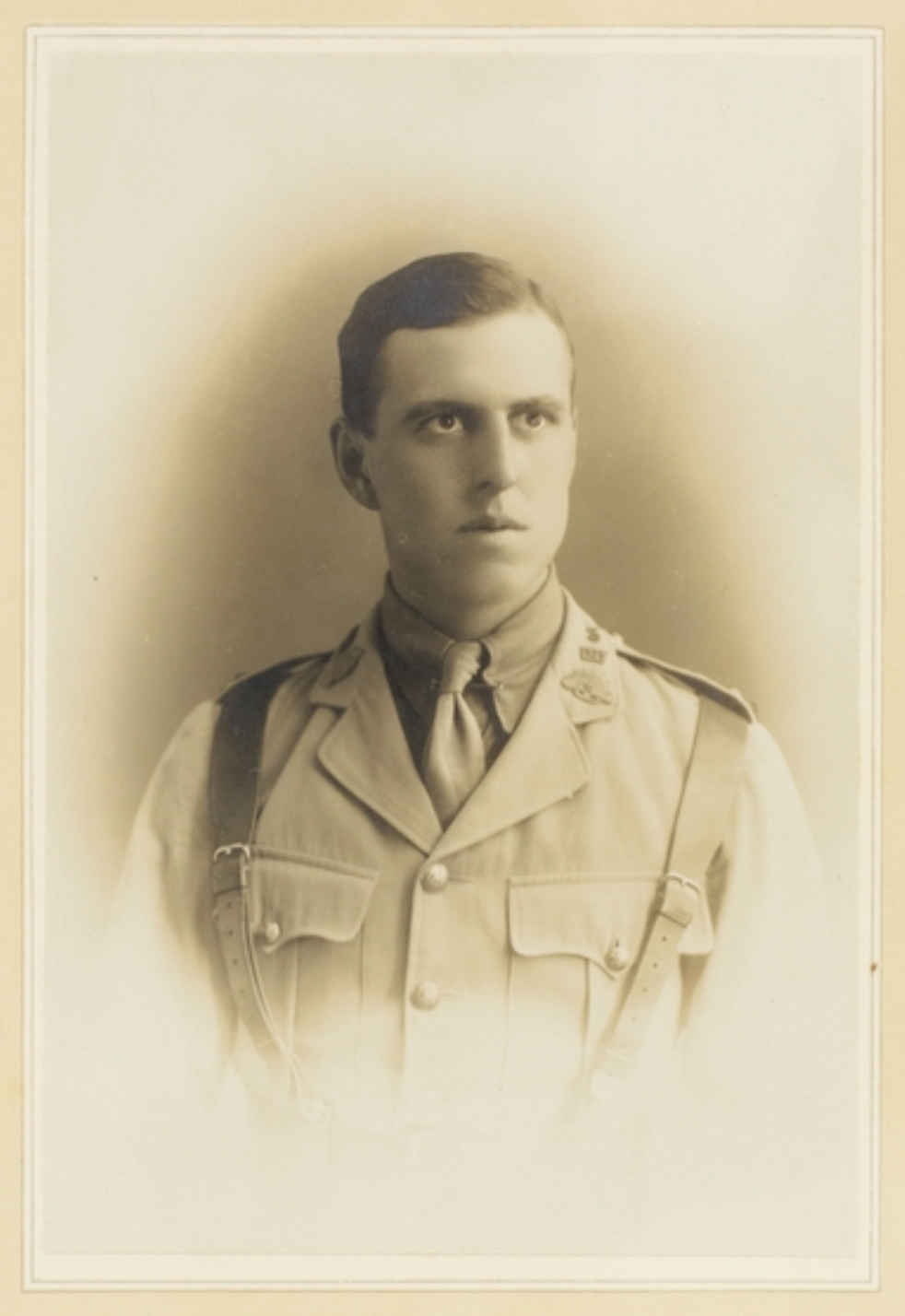
Lieutenant Laurence Street, who fought and died in the Gallipoli campaign at the age of 21

Sir Philip Whistler Street, KCMG, KC (1863–1938) was an Australian judge. He served as the 8th Chief Justice of the Supreme Court of New South Wales and Lieutenant-Governor of New South Wales. On 11 February 1907, he became a full judge of the Supreme Court of New South Wales. He became Chief Justice of the Supreme Court of New South Wales on 28 January 1925 and held that office until 1933. He administered the state in the absence of the governor from May to October 1934, January to February 1935, and January to August 1936. He died in 1938, and he had a state funeral. He is the second longest serving judge in New South Wales history. His son Laurence died fighting in the Gallipoli campaign as an officer in the First Australian Imperial Force, and his son Kenneth succeeded him as Chief Justice of the Supreme Court of New South Wales and Lieutenant-Governor of New South Wales.

== Sir Kenneth Whistler Street's generation ==
Lieutenant Laurence Whistler Street (1894–1915) was an Australian Army officer. He was 21 when he was killed in action in May 1915, while fighting in the Gallipoli campaign in the First World War. He was studying law at Sydney Law School, when he enlisted in the First Australian Imperial Force in August 1914, and he was made an officer of the 3rd Battalion of the 1st Infantry Brigade.

Lieutenant Colonel Sir Kenneth Whistler Street, KCMG, KStJ, QC (1890–1972) was an Australian judge. He served as the 10th Chief Justice of the Supreme Court of New South Wales and Lieutenant-Governor of New South Wales. He was elevated as a judge of the Supreme Court of New South Wales on 7 October 1931, and there he joined the bench of which his father was then Chief Justice. According to Percival Serle, this is the only known case in Australian history of a father and a son sitting together as judges on the same bench. He was sworn in as Chief Justice of the Supreme Court of New South Wales on 7 February 1950. He served as Lieutenant-Governor of New South Wales from 1950 to 1972. Prior to his career as a judge, he served in the First World War. He was commissioned on 29 September 1914 in the Duke of Cornwall's Light Infantry and he was sent to France. He retired with the rank of lieutenant colonel in the Citizens Military Force, and he was buried with a state funeral at St Andrew's Cathedral, Sydney. He is the namesake of Street House at Cranbrook School, Sydney. Kenneth married Jessie Mary Grey Lillingston, and their children were named Laurence, Belinda, Philippa and Roger. His son Laurence succeeded him as Chief Justice of the Supreme Court of New South Wales and Lieutenant-Governor of New South Wales.

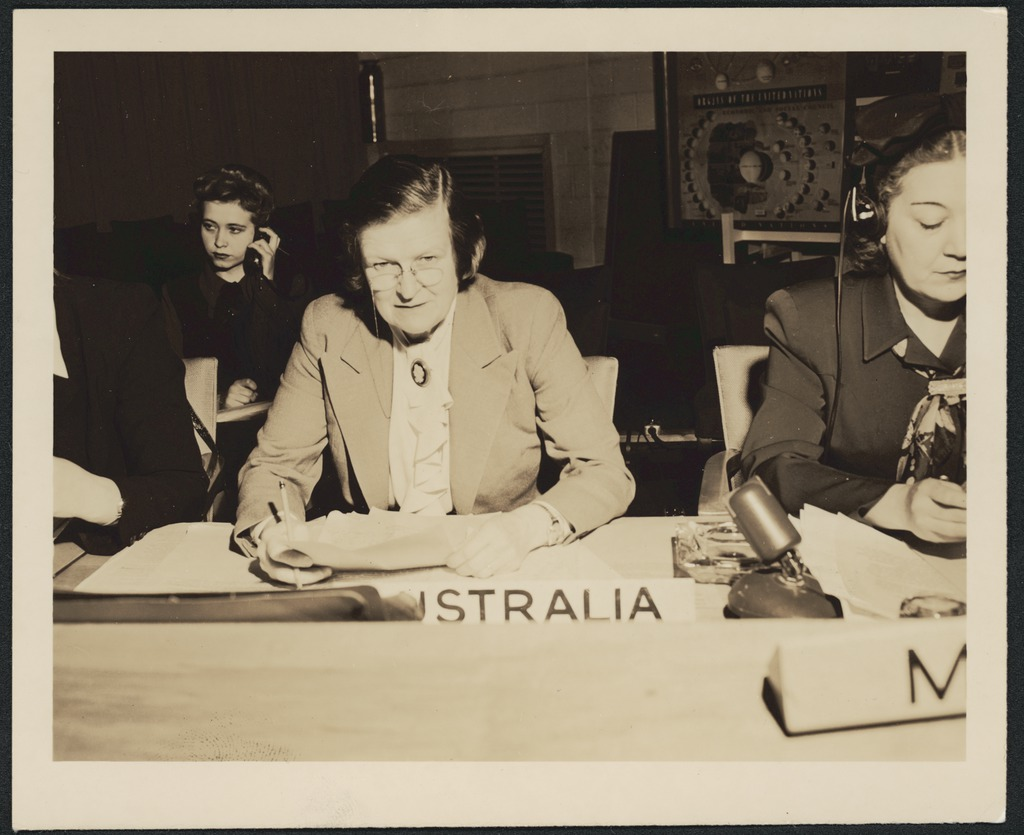
Jessie Street, Australia's first female delegate to the United Nations

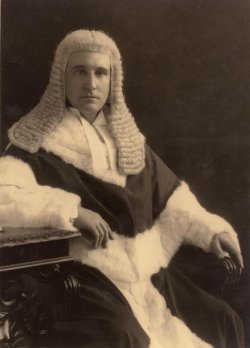
Sir Kenneth Street, 10th Chief Justice of the Supreme Court of New South Wales and Lieutenant-Governor of New South Wales

Jessie Mary Grey, Lady Street (née Lillingston; 1889–1970) was an Australian diplomat, suffragette, and a campaigner for Indigenous Australian rights, referred to as "Red Jessie" by the media. She was born in India to Mabel Harriet Ogilvie, who was born in the Northern Rivers region of New South Wales, Australia, and who died in the Northern Rivers region of New South Wales, Australia, and who was the daughter of Australian politician Edward David Stuart Ogilvie and Theodosia de Burgh, and Charles Alfred Gordon Lillingston, JP, who was born in Southwold, England, and who was educated at the French National School of Forestry, and who served in the Forestry Department of the Imperial Civil Service in India for 14 years, and who died in the County of Ross, Scotland. As Australia's delegate to the founding of the United Nations in 1945, she served as Australia's first delegate to the United Nations, and she served as the first Vice President of the United Nations Commission on the Status of Women. She played a central role in ensuring that sex was included as a non-discrimination clause in the United Nations Charter. She was an extensive campaigner for human rights, from the women's suffrage struggle in England to the removal of Australia's constitutional discrimination against Aboriginal people in 1967. She is the namesake of the Jessie Street Centre, the Jessie Street Trust, the Jessie Street National Women's Library, and the Jessie Street Gardens.

Brigadier Geoffrey Austin Street, MP, MC (1894–1940) was an Australian politician. He was a cousin of Sir Kenneth's, and he served as Australia's Minister for Defence in the First Menzies Government during the Second World War. He was awarded a Military Cross for his courage in serving in the First Australian Imperial Force during the Gallipoli campaign, where he was wounded before returning to service in France during the First World War. At the request of his friend Robert Menzies, he stood for and won the seat of Corangamite in 1934. He became the Minister for Defence in November 1938, and he played a major role in the expansion of the military and munitions prior to the outbreak of the Second World War, and he pushed the National Registration Act (1939) through parliament despite strong opposition. He was killed in the 1940 Canberra air disaster, along with two other federal cabinet ministers and the head of the army. His son Anthony Austin Street succeeded him in his seat of Corangamite.

== Sir Laurence Whistler Street's generation ==
Commander Sir Laurence Whistler Street, AC, KCMG, KStJ, QC (1926–2018) was an Australian judge. He served as the 14th Chief Justice of the Supreme Court of New South Wales and Lieutenant-Governor of New South Wales. He became Chief Justice of the Supreme Court of New South Wales and Lieutenant-Governor of New South Wales in 1974, and he was the youngest person to serve in these viceregal offices since 1844. He joined the Royal Australian Navy at the age of 17 to serve in the Second World War, and he went on to become a commander of the Royal Australian Navy Reserve and an honorary colonel of the Australian Army Reserve. Following his retirement from the court, he was a prolific mediator, and he became the chairman of Fairfax Media, and a director of Banca Monte dei Paschi di Siena. His sister Philippa "Pip" Street married Australian Test cricketer John "Jack" Henry Webb Fingleton, OBE, who was the son of Australian politician James Fingleton. He had a state funeral at the Sydney Opera House Concert Hall in 2018.

Susan Gai Rankine, AM (formerly Lady Street; née Watt; born 1932) served as the first female chair of the Eastern Sydney Health Service. She graduated from the University of New South Wales, and she was the first wife of Sir Laurence. She is the daughter of Australians Ruth Edmunds Watt (née Massey) and Ernest Alexander Stuart Watt, and the niece of pioneering Australian aviator Lieutenant Colonel Walter "Toby" Oswald Watt, OBE, and the granddaughter of Australian politician John Brown Watt, and the great-granddaughter of Australian politician George Kenyon Holden. She remarried Australian engineer John Rankine, who was a co-founder of Rankine & Hill.

Anthony Austin "Tony" Street, MP (1926–2022) was an Australian politician. He was the son of Geoffrey Austin Street, and he succeeded his father in the seat of Corangamite from 1966 to 1983. He served as a Royal Australian Navy sailor in the Second World War, and he served as Australia's Foreign Minister in the Fourth Fraser Ministry, from 1980 until 1983. He had previously served in the Second Fraser Ministry and the Third Fraser Ministry as Minister for Industrial Relations and Minister for Employment and Industrial Relations.

== Recent generations ==
Sir Laurence had four children by his first wife Susan, formerly Lady Street, namely Kenneth, Sylvia, Alexander and Sarah. Kenneth Street is an Australian businessman, and he has three children by his wife Sarah Street (née Kinross). Lieutenant Commander Sylvia Emmett (née Street), AM served as a federal judge, and as an officer of the Royal Australian Naval Reserve. She graduated from Sydney Law School (LLB), and she is married to Australian federal judge Arthur Emmett, AO, who is the Challis Lecturer Professor in Roman Law at Sydney Law School. Sylvia and Arthur Emmett's son James Emmett, SC serves as a judge of the Supreme Court of New South Wales. Commander Alexander "Sandy" Street, SC served as a federal judge, and as an officer of the Royal Australian Naval Reserve. He has four children by two wives. Sarah Farley (née Street) is a graduate of Sydney Law School (LLB), and she has four children by her husband, Australian financier Gerard Farley. Jessie Street, who is Sir Laurence's only child by his second wife Lady (Penelope; née Ferguson) Street, is a graduate of Sydney Law School (JD).

== See also ==
- Dynasties (ABC documentary)
- Jessie Street National Women's Library
- Jessie Street Gardens
