= Philip Whistler Street =

Australian judge (1863–1938)

The Honourable Sir Philip Whistler Street
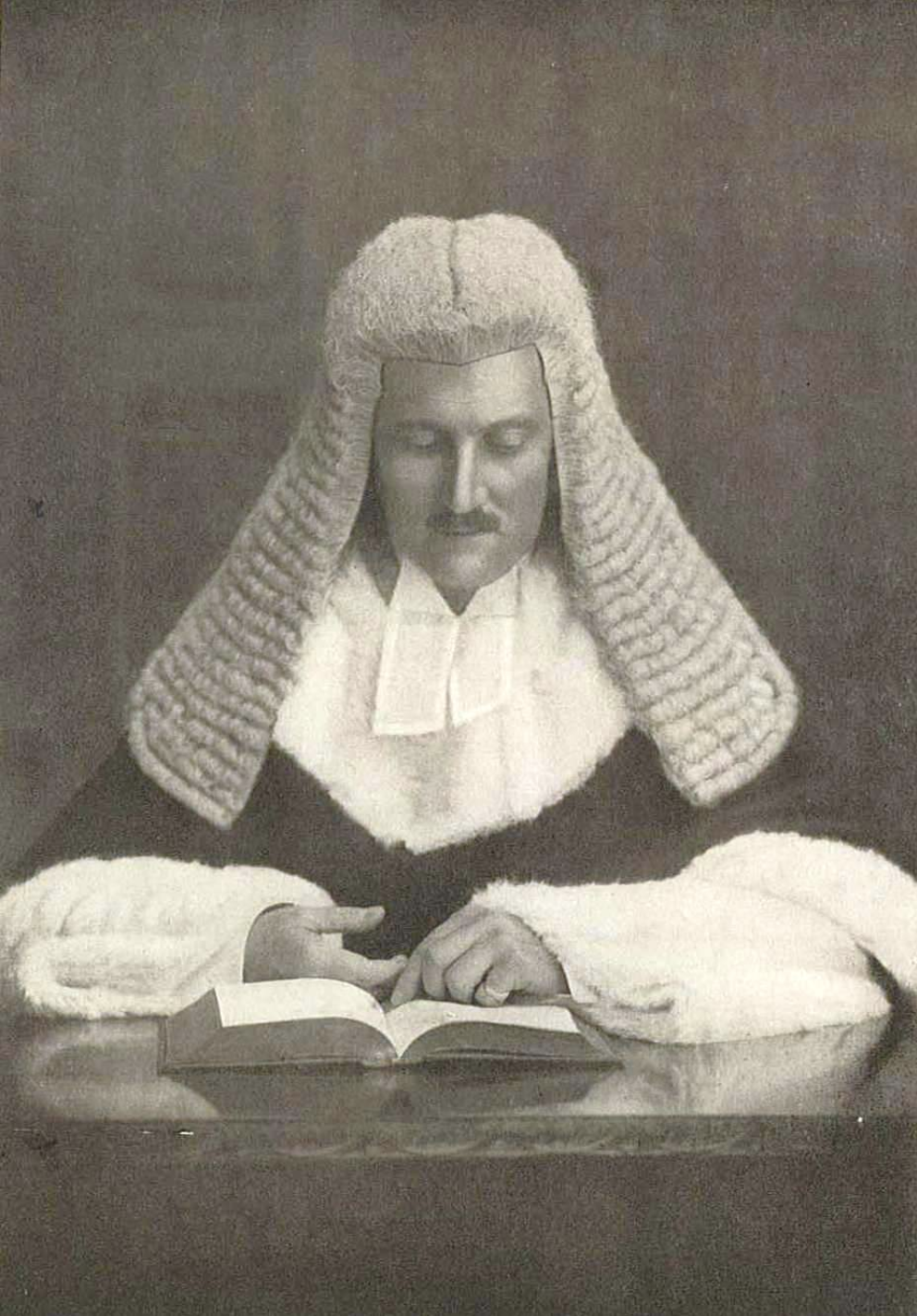

8th Chief Justice of New South Wales
- In office 1925–1934
- Appointed by: Sir Dudley de Chair
- Preceded by: Sir William Cullen
- Succeeded by: Sir Frederick Jordan

Lieutenant-Governor of New South Wales
- In office 1 October 1930 – 17 October 1938
- Preceded by: Sir William Cullen
- Succeeded by: Sir Frederick Jordan

Personal details
- Born: 9 August 1863 Sydney, New South Wales, Australia
- Died: 11 September 1938 (aged 75) Sydney, New South Wales, Australia
- Children: Sir Kenneth Street
- Parent: John Street
- Relatives: Street family Jessie Street (née Lillingston; daughter-in-law)
- Education: Sydney Law School

Sir Philip Whistler Street, KCMG, KC (9 August 1863 – 11 September 1938) was an Australian judge. He served as the 8th Chief Justice of the Supreme Court of New South Wales and Lieutenant-Governor of New South Wales. He was the first generation of the Street family to serve in these viceregal offices, which were later held by his son Lieutenant Colonel Sir Kenneth Whistler Street, and his grandson Commander Sir Laurence Whistler Street.

He was the first wholly Australian-trained lawyer to serve as Chief Justice of Australia's first Supreme Court, and he was the second longest serving Chief Justice of that Supreme Court. His son Sir Kenneth's accession to the Supreme Court of New South Wales while he was Chief Justice made the only Australian case of a father and son presiding over the same Supreme Court.

== Early years ==
Street was born in Sydney, New South Wales, Australia on 9 August 1863. He was the son of Australian politician John Street and Susanna Caroline Street (née Lawson). His father was a member of the New South Wales Legislative Assembly from 1887 to 1891, and his mother was the granddaughter of Australian explorer William Lawson, who pioneered the first successful crossing of the Blue Mountains by British colonists, along with William Wentworth and Gregory Blaxland.

Street attended Sydney Grammar School. He obtained a bachelor's degree from Sydney Law School in 1883, and he was admitted to the New South Wales Bar Association on 25 August 1886. He married Belinda Maud Poolman (24 February 1865 – 7 September 1944) at St John's Anglican Church in Toorak, Melbourne, on 1 February 1888.

== Early career ==
On 24 July 1906, he was appointed as a judge of the Supreme Court of New South Wales. Street was made a full judge of the Supreme Court on 11 February 1907 following the resignation of Justice W. G. Walker in February of that year. Street principally presided in bankruptcy, divorce and probate cases. He was also deputy president of the now abolished Court of Arbitration, which dealt with industrial disputes between employer and employee, as well as setting minimum wage standards in the state. Street also sat in the now abolished Vice-Admiralty Court, first established in New South Wales during the time of Governor Arthur Phillip to deal with maritime disputes. In 1915, one of his sons, Lieutenant Laurence Whistler Street, was killed in action at Gallipoli serving in the First World War. Laurence had volunteered for military service in August 1914, making him one of the earliest of his generation to do so.

In 1918, Street was appointed the Chief Judge in Equity. He was the first wholly Australian-trained lawyer to become Chief Justice of Australia's first Supreme Court. Street was also appointed a Royal Commissioner on many occasions. The most significant of these were concerning the administration of the Returned Soldiers' Settlement Branch of the Department of Lands in 1921 and the case against the Industrial Workers of the World (IWW) in 1918. In the latter commission, IWW was an organisation that promoted the concept of one big union. In Australia, they were active in campaigning against World War I. One campaign led to a police officer being shot and killed, for which two IWW members were found guilty and hanged.

== Later career ==
"Street had the culture, dignity and temperament suitable for his position. He had a wide knowledge of law and the ability to quickly reach the heart of the matter; however complicated a case might seem on the surface, the real issue involved soon became apparent to him. Though he had a keen sense of humour his court never lost its dignity and decorum, and though he would not allow himself to be fettered by mere technicalities, he insisted on the maintenance of the basic principles of law. His courtesy was universal and he never lost the affection and respect of the members of his profession."

— Percival Serle, Dictionary of Australian Biography

Street's elder son Kenneth became a judge of the Supreme Court of New South Wales while he was himself. According to Percival Serle, this may be the first time a father and son have sat on the same Supreme Court bench together.

Street became acting Chief Justice in 1924 and on 28 January 1925, he became Chief Justice proper, succeeding Sir William Cullen. He was appointed KCMG by King George V in the 1928 New Year's List. He became Lieutenant-Governor of New South Wales in 1930, and he administered the government in the absence of the governor in 1934, 1935, and 1936. Street served as Chief Justice until his 70th birthday in 1933. According to the Supreme Court, he resigned his commission, although Serle notes that he actually retired. Whichever is correct, he was the second longest serving judge in New South Wales history.

== Family ==
Sir Philip's brother Ernest married Emma Browne, who was the daughter of Australian police magistrate and author Commissioner Thomas Alexander Browne.

Sir Philip's son Sir Kenneth Whistler Street married Jessie Mary Grey (née Lillingston), Lady Street, who served as Australia's first female delegate to the United Nations, and as the first Vice President of the United Nations Commission on the Status of Women, and who was the daughter of Charles Alfred Gordon Lillingston, JP, an Imperial Civil Service officer, and Mabel Harriet Ogilvie, who was the daughter of Australian politician Edward David Stuart Ogilvie and Theodosia de Burgh. Sir Kenneth and Jessie had four children. Their daughter Philippa married Australian Test cricketer Jack Fingleton, OBE, who was the son of Australian politician James Fingleton. Their son Commander Sir Laurence Whistler Street married Susan Gai (née Watt; formerly Lady Street), AM, who served as the first female chair of the Eastern Sydney Health Service, and who was the niece of pioneering Australian aviator Lieutenant Colonel Walter "Toby" Oswald Watt, OBE, and the granddaughter of Australian politician John Brown Watt, and the great-granddaughter of Australian politician George Kenyon Holden. Sir Laurence's son Commander Alexander "Sandy" Street, SC, served as an Australian federal judge, and as an officer of the Royal Australian Naval Reserve. Sir Laurence's daughter Lieutenant Commander Sylvia Emmett (née Street), AM served as an Australian federal judge, and as an officer of the Royal Australian Naval Reserve, and she is married to Australian federal judge Arthur Emmett, AO, KC, who is the Challis Lecturer Professor in Roman Law at Sydney Law School. Sylvia and Arthur's son James Emmett, SC serves as a judge of the Supreme Court of New South Wales.

Legal offices
Preceded by Sir William Cullen	Chief Justice of New South Wales; 1925–1934	Succeeded by Sir Frederick Jordan
Government offices
Preceded by Sir William Cullen	Lieutenant-Governor of New South Wales; 1930–1938	Succeeded by Sir Frederick Jordan
Preceded by Sir John Sulman	President of the Board of Trustees of the Art Gallery of New South Wales; 1934–1938	Succeeded by John Lane Mullins
