= James Emmett (judge) =

Australian judge

The Honourable Justice James Emmett

Judge of the Supreme Court of New South Wales
- Incumbent
- Assumed office 4 December 2025
- Nominated by: Michael Daley
- Appointed by: Margaret Beazley

Personal details
- Spouse: Peter Wilson
- Parent(s): Arthur Emmett (father); Sylvia Emmett (mother)
- Relatives: Street family
- Education: Sydney Grammar School
- Alma mater: University of Cambridge (BA); University of New South Wales (LLB)
- Occupation: Judge, barrister

James Emmett is a judge of the Supreme Court of New South Wales, the highest court in the State of New South Wales, Australia, which forms part of the Australian court hierarchy.

== Early life and education ==
Emmett is one of six children born of Arthur Emmett AO KC and Sylvia Emmett (née Street) AM KC. His father, Arthur, was a judge of the New South Wales Court of Appeal and the Federal Court of Australia, as well as serving as the Challis Lecturer in Roman Law at Sydney Law School. His mother, Sylvia, was a Federal Magistrate and Judge of the Federal Circuit Court of Australia.

Emmett was educated at Sydney Grammar School before studying classics at the University of Cambridge. He then studied law at the University of New South Wales.

== Career ==
Emmett started his career in 2004 as judicial associate to Chief Justice of Australia Murray Gleeson at the High Court of Australia. In 2005, he commenced practice as a solicitor at Mallesons in Sydney. He was called to the bar in the same year and commenced practice at 11 Wentworth. He later moved to 12 Wentworth Selborne and, in 2017, to Banco Chambers. Emmett was appointed senior counsel in 2020. He practised predominantly in public law, administrative law, professional negligence and maritime law. He lectured at Sydney Law School. Emmett acted for New South Wales Police in proceedings against the Palestine Action Group concerning the holding of a protest relating to the war in Gaza.

Emmett was nominated to the bench by New South Wales Attorney General Michael Daley and sworn in as a judge of the New South Wales Supreme Court on 4 December 2025.

== Personal life ==
Emmett is married to Peter Wilson, managing director of investment bank Greenhill Australia. The couple are art collectors and live in the inner suburbs of Sydney. Emmett is the chair of the National Association for the Visual Arts and is a Member of the Australian National Maritime Museum Council.

Emmett is a member of the Street family through his mother, Sylvia Emmett (née Street). He is descended from three Chief Justices and Lieutenant-Governors of New South Wales:

1. Commander Sir Laurence Whistler Street (14th Chief Justice and Lieutenant-Governor).
2. Sir Kenneth Whistler Street (10th Chief Justice and Lieutenant-Governor of New South Wales).
3. Sir Philip Whistler Street (8th Chief Justice and Lieutenant-Governor of New South Wales).

His great-grandmother, Jessie Street, was an Australian diplomat, suffragette, and Australia's only female delegate to the San Francisco Conference founding the United Nations. His uncle, Sandy Street, is a judge of the Federal Circuit and Family Court of Australia.

== See also ==
- Supreme Court of New South Wales
