= Kenneth Street (jurist) =

Australian judge

The Honourable Sir Kenneth Whistler Street
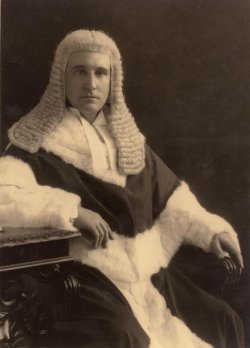

10th Chief Justice of New South Wales
- In office 6 January 1950 – 27 January 1960
- Appointed by: Elizabeth II
- Preceded by: Sir Frederick Jordan
- Succeeded by: Herbert Evatt

Lieutenant-Governor of New South Wales
- In office 27 February 1950 – 22 April 1972
- Preceded by: Sir Frederick Jordan
- Succeeded by: Sir Leslie Herron

Personal details
- Born: 28 January 1890 Sydney, New South Wales, Australia
- Died: 15 February 1972 (aged 82) Sydney, New South Wales, Australia
- Spouse: Jessie, Lady Street (m. 1916; died 1970)
- Children: Sir Laurence Street
- Parent: Sir Philip Street
- Relatives: Street family
- Education: Sydney Law School

Military service
- Allegiance: United Kingdom; Australia
- Branch/service: British Army; Citizens Military Force
- Rank: Lieutenant Colonel
- Battles/wars: First World War

Sir Kenneth Whistler Street, KCMG, KStJ, QC (28 January 1890 – 15 February 1972) was an Australian judge. He served as the 10th Chief Justice of the Supreme Court of New South Wales and Lieutenant-Governor of New South Wales. He was the second generation of the Street family to serve in these viceregal offices, as they were held before him by his father Sir Philip Whistler Street, and after him by his son Commander Sir Laurence Whistler Street.

Street enlisted in the British Army in the First World War, and he was deployed to France in September 1914 to fight with the Duke of Cornwall's Light Infantry. He later rose to the rank of lieutenant colonel in the Citizens Military Force. He was a lecturer at Sydney Law School, and he was the husband of Jessie Mary Grey, Lady Street, who served as Australia's first female delegate to the United Nations, and as the first Vice President of the United Nations Commission on the Status of Women.

== Early years ==
Street was born on 28 January 1890 in Sydney, New South Wales, Australia. He was the son of Sir Philip Whistler Street and his Victorian wife Belinda Maud (née Poolman). His father served as the Chief Justice of the Supreme Court of New South Wales, and as Lieutenant-Governor of New South Wales. He was the grandson of Australian politician John Street. He attended Homebush Grammar School, Sydney Grammar School and Sydney Law School (BA, 1911; LLB, 1914), and he won scholarships in law.

On 29 September 1914, he enlisted to serve in the First World War with the Duke of Cornwall's Light Infantry in France. He was made a lieutenant of the 18th (North Sydney) Infantry Regiment in December 1915, and promoted to captain in September 1917, serving in the Adjutant General's Department at the Australian Army headquarters in Melbourne. His younger brother Lieutenant Laurence Whistler Street was a fellow Sydney Law School student who enlisted before him, and who was killed in action during the Gallipoli campaign at the age of 21.

== Judicial career ==
From 1921 to 1927, Street lectured part time at Sydney Law School. Meanwhile, he continued his career in the Militia as a legal staff officer (1922–28) and rose to the rank of lieutenant colonel. Street enjoyed a wide general practice and would have taken silk, but for his appointment to serve on the reconstituted Industrial Commission of New South Wales from 16 December 1927. He was elevated as a judge of the Supreme Court of New South Wales on 7 October 1931. He thus joined the bench of which his father was then Chief Justice, the first and only such case in Australian history. In 1949, as senior puisne judge, Street acted as Chief Justice when Sir Frederick Jordan died. Confirmed in that office from 6 January 1950, he was sworn in on 7 February.

== Further details ==
Street was a considerable scholar of an authority on the writings of Pepys, and he was an accomplished Latinist. In 1951, he was made a Knight of Grace of the Order of St John of Jerusalem. In 1952, he was awarded an honorary Doctor of Laws by the University of Sydney. In 1956, he was made Knight Commander of the Order of St Michael and St George. He retired from the bench on his 70th birthday, as did his father. Sir Kenneth died peacefully on 15 February 1972 and had a state funeral at St Andrew's Cathedral, Sydney. He is the namesake of Street House at Cranbrook School, Sydney.

== Family ==
Street married Jessie Mary Grey Lillingston, who served as Australia's first female delegate to the United Nations, and as the first Vice President of the United Nations Commission on the Status of Women, and who was the daughter of Charles Alfred Gordon Lillingston, JP, an Imperial Civil Service officer, and Mabel Harriet Ogilvie, who was the daughter of Australian politician Edward David Stuart Ogilvie and Theodosia de Burgh. Sir Kenneth and Jessie had four children, Belinda, Roger, Philippa, and Laurence. Their daughter Philippa married Australian Test cricketer Jack Fingleton, OBE, who was the son of Australian politician James Fingleton. Their son Commander Sir Laurence Whistler Street married Susan Gai (née Watt; formerly Lady Street), AM, who served as the first female chair of the Eastern Sydney Health Service, and who was the niece of pioneering Australian aviator Lieutenant Colonel Walter "Toby" Oswald Watt, OBE, and the granddaughter of Australian politician John Brown Watt, and the great-granddaughter of Australian politician George Kenyon Holden. Sir Laurence's son Commander Alexander "Sandy" Street, SC, served as an Australian federal judge, and as an officer of the Royal Australian Naval Reserve. Sir Laurence's daughter Lieutenant Commander Sylvia Emmett (née Street), AM served as an Australian federal judge, and as an officer of the Royal Australian Naval Reserve, and she is married to Australian federal judge Arthur Emmett, AO, KC, who is the Challis Lecturer Professor in Roman Law at Sydney Law School. Sylvia and Arthur's son James Emmett, SC serves as a judge of the Supreme Court of New South Wales.

Legal offices
Preceded by Sir Frederick Jordan	Chief Justice of New South Wales; 1950–1960	Succeeded by Herbert Evatt
Government offices
Preceded by Sir Frederick Jordan	Lieutenant-Governor of New South Wales; 1950–1972	Succeeded by Sir Leslie Herron
