= Sandy Street =

Australian judge

The Honourable Alexander Whistler Street

Judge of the Federal Circuit Court
- Incumbent
- Assumed office 1 January 2015

Personal details
- Born: Sydney, Australia
- Parent: Sir Laurence Street
- Relatives: Street family Arthur Emmett (brother-in-law); James Emmett (nephew)

Military service
- Allegiance: Commonwealth of Australia
- Branch/service: Royal Australian Navy Reserve
- Rank: Commander

Alexander "Sandy" Whistler Street, SC is an Australian federal judge and naval commander. His father Commander Sir Laurence Whistler Street, grandfather Lieutenant Colonel Sir Kenneth Whistler Street, and great-grandfather Sir Philip Whistler Street each served as Chief Justice of the Supreme Court of New South Wales, and as Lieutenant-Governor of New South Wales.

== Biography ==
Street was born in Sydney. He is the son of Commander Sir Laurence Whistler Street and Susan Gai (née Watt; formerly Lady Street), AM, who served as the first female chair of the Eastern Sydney Health Service. His grandmother Lady "Red Jessie" Street served as Australia's first female delegate to the United Nations, and as the first Vice President of the United Nations Commission on the Status of Women. His sister Lieutenant Commander Sylvia Emmett (née Street), AM served as a federal judge, and as an officer of the Royal Australian Naval Reserve, and she is married to Australian federal judge Arthur Emmett, AO, KC who is the Challis Lecturer professor in Roman Law at Sydney Law School. His nephew James Emmett, SC serves as a judge of the Supreme Court of New South Wales. His brother Kenneth Street is a businessman, and his sister Sarah Farley (née Street) is a businesswoman. His half-sister by his father's second marriage to Penelope (née Ferguson), Lady Street, Jessie Street, is a lawyer. He has four children: Charles Street, a barrister; Jack Street, a lawyer; Lucy Street and Heidi Street.

== Career ==
On 1 January 2015, Street was appointed to the Federal Circuit Court of Australia, now the Federal Circuit and Family Court of Australia, by the Attorney-General George Brandis.

=== Criticism ===
In 2015, one of Street's rulings was overturned by the full Federal Court on appeal after he dismissed a cerebral palsy sufferer's claim of discrimination and pursuit of damages against Virgin Australia for refusing to allow his guide dog on a flight.

In late 2015, statistics were filed in court which revealed Street had heard 254 migration appeals between January and June 2015, and had found in favour of the immigration minister in 252 cases (99.21% of cases). In that same period, Street disposed of 286 cases while his eight judicial colleagues disposed of a combined 357 cases. Street was accused of lacking procedural fairness and over 80 of his rulings were subsequently overturned in five years. Similarly, many of his judgements were delivered ex tempore (literally, "on the spot") without taking further time to consider cases more deeply.

In a case report from September 2018, he was found by the full Federal Court to have dismissed an Afghan asylum seeker's case without sufficient reasoning. In another case report from 2019, after an ex tempore decision, he took 75 days to provide written reasoning for his dismissal of an Iranian asylum seeker's application to review a visa rejection, when the litigant had only 21 days to appeal. The case was later ordered for retrial by a different judge due to procedural unfairness.

In 2022, Street was criticised for displaying bias in a bankruptcy dispute.
