= Laurence Street =

Australian judge (1926–2018)

The Honourable Sir Laurence Whistler Street
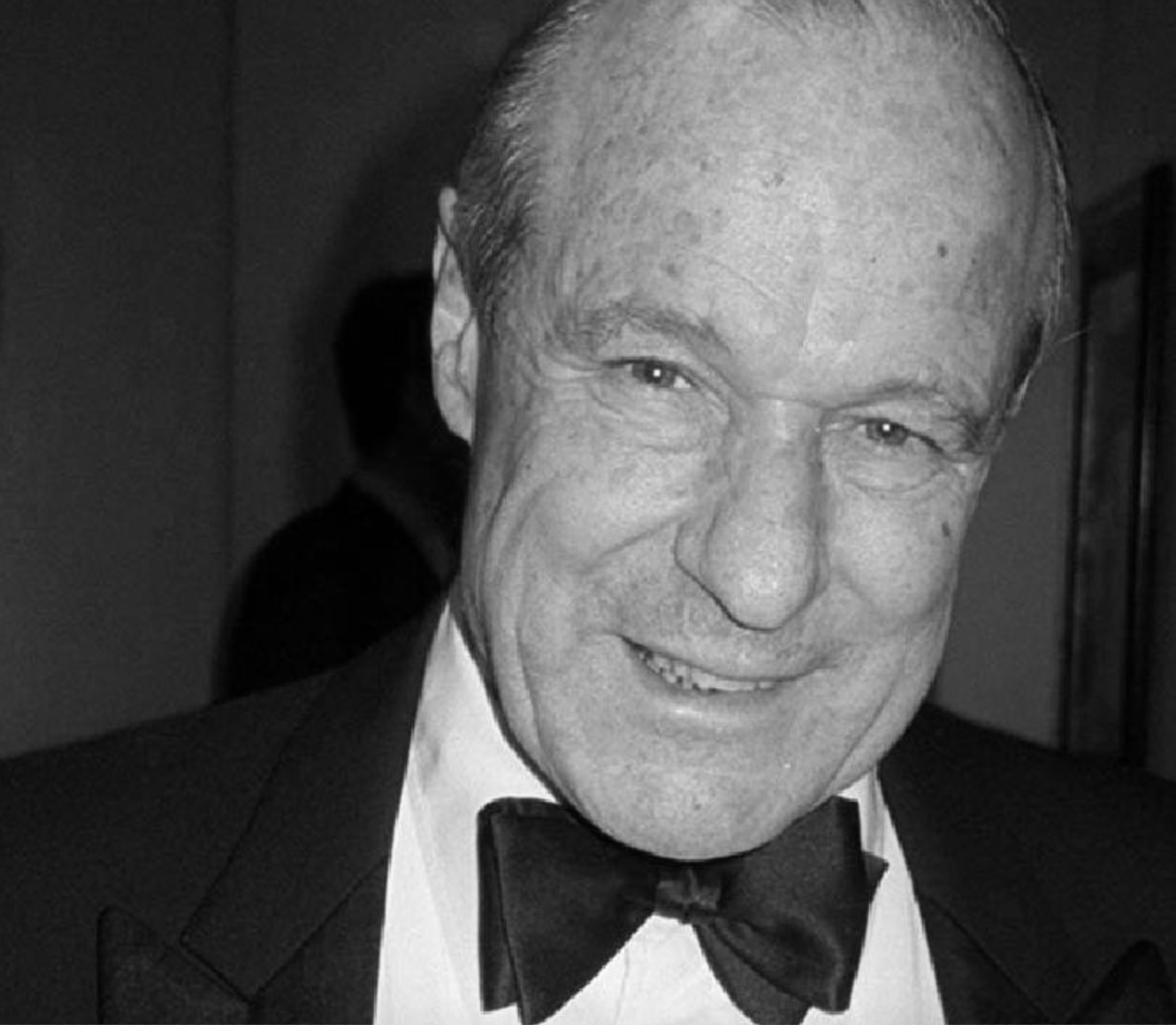

14th Chief Justice of New South Wales
- In office 28 June 1974 – 1 November 1988
- Appointed by: Elizabeth II
- Preceded by: Sir John Kerr
- Succeeded by: Murray Gleeson

Lieutenant-Governor of New South Wales
- In office 1 July 1974 – 24 July 1989
- Preceded by: Sir Leslie Herron
- Succeeded by: Murray Gleeson

Personal details
- Born: 3 July 1926 Sydney, New South Wales, Australia
- Died: 21 June 2018 (aged 91) Sydney, New South Wales, Australia
- Children: 5, including Sylvia and Sandy
- Parent(s): Sir Kenneth Street; Jessie, Lady Street
- Relatives: Street family Arthur Emmett (son-in-law)
- Education: Sydney Law School

Military service
- Allegiance: Australia
- Branch/service: Royal Australian Navy
- Rank: Commander
- Battles/wars: Second World War

Sir Laurence Whistler Street, AC, KCMG, KStJ, QC (3 July 1926 – 21 June 2018) was an Australian judge. He served as the 14th Chief Justice of the Supreme Court of New South Wales and Lieutenant-Governor of New South Wales. He was the third generation of the Street family to serve in these viceregal offices, and the youngest since 1844. Street fought in World War II, and he became a commander of the Royal Australian Navy Reserve, and an honorary colonel of the Australian Army Reserve.

Following his retirement from the bench, Street became the chairman of Fairfax Media and a director of Banca Monte dei Paschi di Siena. He chaired the integration of protocols between the Australian Federal Police and the Australian Security Intelligence Organisation, and he chaired naval warship acquisitions. He pioneered alternative dispute resolution, worked prolifically in mediation, and he ascertained the return to Australia of the remains of 17 Indigenous Australians from the National History Museum in London, the first such mediation.

== Early years ==
Street was born in Sydney, New South Wales, Australia. He was the son of Lieutenant Colonel Sir Kenneth Whistler Street and Jessie Mary Grey (née Lillingston), Lady Street, who served as Australia's first female delegate to the United Nations, and as the first Vice President of the United Nations Commission on the Status of Women. His mother Jessie was the daughter of Charles Alfred Gordon Lillingston, JP, an Imperial Civil Service officer, and Mabel Harriet Ogilvie, the daughter of Australian politician Edward David Stuart Ogilvie and Theodosia de Burgh. He was the grandson of Australian judge Sir Philip Whistler Street, and the great-grandson of Australian politician John Street. His father and his grandfather each served as Chief Justice of the Supreme Court of New South Wales and Lieutenant-Governor of New South Wales before him.

He attended the Cranbrook School. At the age of 17, he joined the Royal Australian Navy and was deployed to fight in the Second World War. After returning from the war, he graduated from Sydney Law School.

== Career ==
Street became a barrister at the New South Wales Bar in 1951. As a barrister, he practised extensively in equity, commercial law and maritime law. In 1965, he was appointed as a judge of the New South Wales Supreme Court in the Equity Division. In 1974, at age 47, Street became the youngest Chief Justice since 1844. In 1976 he was appointed a Knight Commander of the Order of St Michael and St George. He retired in 1988 and was appointed Companion of the Order of Australia in 1989.

Following his retirement from the bench, Street became a director and later chairman of Fairfax Media, and a director of Monte dei Paschi di Siena. He also held office as Australian and world president of the International Law Association, London of which he was a life vice president. He was a member of several professional organisations, including an Honorary Fellow of the Australian Institute of Building and an Honorary Member of the Society of Construction Law Australia. He was a patron of the Jessie Street National Women's Library and the Jessie Street Trust, which uphold his mother's legacy in women's rights and Indigenous Australian rights. In 1986 he became the first patron of Australian Dispute Resolution Association, and from 1989, he worked prolifically in mediation and alternative dispute resolution. This work included 1,500 mediations, mainly in major commercial disputes.

In 2007, Street led the review of a decision by Queensland's Director of Public Prosecution in the 2004 case of an Indigenous Australian death in custody, and conducted the first mediation over the return to Australia of Indigenous Australian remains from the National History Museum in London. In 2008, he chaired the integration of procedural protocols between the Australian Federal Police, the Australian Security Intelligence Organisation and the Commonwealth Director of Prosecutions, and chaired an inquiry into the Defence Force Disciplinary System. In 2005, he oversaw the Defence Department's $8 billion air warfare destroyer project.

== Family ==
Sir Laurence's sister Philippa married Australian Test cricketer Jack Fingleton, OBE, who was the son of Australian politician James Fingleton.

Sir Laurence married Susan Gai (née Watt; formerly Lady Street), AM, who served as the first female chair of the Eastern Sydney Health Service, and who was the niece of pioneering Australian aviator Lieutenant Colonel Walter "Toby" Oswald Watt, OBE, and the granddaughter of Australian politician John Brown Watt, and the great-granddaughter of Australian politician George Kenyon Holden. Sir Laurence had four children by his first wife Susan, formerly Lady Street, namely Kenneth, Sylvia, Alexander and Sarah. Kenneth Street is an Australian businessman, and he has three children by his wife Sarah Street (née Kinross). Lieutenant Commander Sylvia Emmett (née Street), AM served as a federal judge, and as an officer of the Royal Australian Naval Reserve. She graduated from Sydney Law School (LLB), and she is married to Australian federal judge Arthur Emmett, AO, who is the Challis Lecturer Professor in Roman Law at Sydney Law School. Sylvia and Arthur Emmett's son James Emmett, SC serves as a judge of the Supreme Court of New South Wales. Commander Alexander "Sandy" Street, SC served as a federal judge, and as an officer of the Royal Australian Naval Reserve. He has four children by two wives. Sarah Farley (née Street) is a graduate of Sydney Law School (LLB), and she has four children by her husband, Australian financier Gerard Farley. Jessie Street, who is Sir Laurence's only child by his second wife Lady (Penelope; née Ferguson) Street, is a graduate of Sydney Law School (JD).

== Death and legacy ==
Street died on 21 June 2018, and he had a state funeral at the Sydney Opera House Concert Hall in July 2018. In a eulogy before 700 attendees, the incumbent Prime Minister of Australia at the time, Malcolm Turnbull, recalled that it was Street who provided his reference to enter the University of Oxford as a Rhodes Scholar, and he spoke of his mentor: "As a barrister, he was as eloquent as he was erudite, as formidable as he was fashionable […] Laurence had movie star good looks coupled with a charisma, charm and intellect, a humility, a humanity that swept all before him […] His nickname, 'Lorenzo the Magnificent', was well earned." The incumbent Chief Justice of the Supreme Court of New South Wales and Lieutenant-Governor of New South Wales at the time, Tom Bathurst, remembered him as "one of the outstanding jurists of the 20th century."

Legal offices
Preceded by Sir John Kerr	Chief Justice of New South Wales; 1974–1988	Succeeded by Murray Gleeson
Government offices
Preceded by Sir Leslie Herron	Lieutenant-Governor of New South Wales; 1974–1989	Succeeded by Murray Gleeson
