= Peter Sekuless =

Australian author and lobbyist

Peter Sekuless (born 1945) is an Australian author and lobbyist based in Canberra, Australia. Between 1967 and 1974 he was a journalist with The Canberra Times.

He founded the government relations firm Canberra Liaison with Jonathan Gaul in 1978. He has written several books, including two on lobbying and one on the Australian political activist Jessie Street.

== Bibliography ==
- Fred - An Australian Hero, UQP, 1981 ISBN 0-7022-1646-1
- Jessie Street - a rewarding but unrewarded life, St Lucia, Qld, 1978 ISBN 0-7022-1227-X
- Lest We Forget - the history of the Returned Services League Sekuless and Jaqueline Rees, 1986
- A Handful of Hacks - Seven War Correspondents in War and Peace, 1998
- The Lobbyists - Using them in Canberra, 1984
