= Arthur Emmett (judge) =

Australian judge (born 1943)

The Honourable Arthur Emmett

Acting Judge of the New South Wales Court of Appeal
- Incumbent
- Assumed office 30 September 2015

Judge of the New South Wales Court of Appeal
- In office 7 March 2013 – 30 September 2015

Judge of the Federal Court of Australia
- In office 3 February 1997 – 6 March 2013

Personal details
- Born: Arthur Robert Emmett; 1943 (age 82–83) Crows Nest, New South Wales, Australia
- Spouses: Sylvia Emmett (née Street)
- Children: 6, including James
- Relatives: Street family (in-law); Sir Laurence Street (father-in-law); Sandy Street (brother-in-law)
- Education: Sydney Law School

Arthur Robert Emmett, AO, KC (born 1943) is an Australian federal judge and the Challis Lecturer Professor in Roman Law at Sydney Law School. From 1997 to 2013, he served as a judge of the Federal Court of Australia. Arthur further served as a member of the New South Wales Court of Appeal from 7 March 2013 to 30 September 2015, and he has continued to serve as an Acting Judge of the Court of Appeal since that date. His son James Emmett, SC serves as a judge of the Supreme Court of New South Wales.

== Biography ==
Arthur was born in Crows Nest, New South Wales, Australia in 1943. He was educated at North Sydney Boys High School and the University of Sydney, where he earned a Bachelor of Arts in 1964, a Bachelor of Laws in 1967, and a Master of Laws in 1976. Arthur has lectured in Roman Law at Sydney Law School since 1990, and there he holds the title of Challis Lecturer in Roman Law. On 22 May 2009, the University of Sydney conferred upon Emmett the degree of Doctor of Laws (honoris causa).

In 1967, Arthur was admitted as a solicitor in New South Wales. From 1964 to 1978, he was employed by Dawson Waldron, now Ashurst LLP, eventually being promoted to Partner. He practised primarily in mergers and acquisitions and corporate finance, as well as estate planning.

In 1978, Arthur was called to the Bar of New South Wales and practised from the prestigious Eleventh Floor Wentworth Chambers. He was appointed Queens Counsel for New South Wales in 1985. While at the Bar, he practised in the Federal Court and the Equity and Commercial Divisions of the Supreme Courts of NSW, WA, ACT, SA and Victoria. He also served on several committees while at the Bar, including the Legal Services Tribunal.

Arthur was appointed a Justice of the Federal Court of Australia in 1997, holding the appointment until 2013. He was a member of the Admiralty, Competition, Corporations, Patents and Taxation Panels of the Court. Following this appointment, Arthur was a Judge and Judge Appeal of the Supreme Court of NSW, which he held until October 2015. From then until 1 October 2021 he was an Acting Judge of Appeal, regularly sitting in the Equity Division.

Since his judgeship, Arthur he continued to enjoy membership of the panel of Recognised International Market Experts in Finance, a member of the Court of Arbitration for Sport, and a member of the International Arbitration Centre's Panel of Arbitrators for Financial Services Disputes.

Arthur is currently the Chair of the Electoral Commission of NSW, the presiding member of the Legal Profession Admission Board of NSW, the Chair of the Admissions Committee of the Legal Services Council and the Chair of the Law Admissions Consultative Committee appointed by the Council of Chief Justices.

== Personal life ==
Arthur's wife Lieutenant Commander Sylvia Emmett (née Street), AM served as a federal judge, and as an officer of the Royal Australian Naval Reserve. She graduated from Sydney Law School (LLB), and she is the daughter of the late Chief Justice of the Supreme Court of New South Wales and Lieutenant-Governor of New South Wales, Commander Sir Laurence Whistler Street. They have six children: Laurence, Hilary, Robert, James, Phoebe-Jane, and Christopher.
