= Shellharbour Hospital =

- South Eastern Sydney and Illawarra Area Health Service

Geography
- Location: Mount Warrigal, NSW, Australia
- Coordinates: 34°33.5′S 150°50.5′E

Organisation
- Care system: Public Medicare (AU)
- Type: District
- Affiliated university: University of New South Wales, University of Wollongong

Services
- Emergency department: Yes
- Beds: 80

History
- Founded: 1986

Links
- Website: sesiahs.health.nsw.gov.au/Shellharbour_Hospital
- Lists: Hospitals in Australia

Shellharbour Hospital is a major district hospital located in the Shellharbour area of New South Wales. It is part of the Southern network of the South Eastern Sydney and Illawarra Area Health Service, and receives students from the University of New South Wales and University of Wollongong.

== Services ==
Shellharbour Hospital provides medical, surgical, obstetric, emergency and psychiatry services to the Shoalhaven and northern Illawarra region, operating 87 beds and a 8-bed Day Surgery unit and 69 mental health in-patient beds. It also operates a satellite dialysis unit, and is also a leading provider of gynaecological and laparoscopic surgery in the Southern region. In the year 2006-7 there were over 15,000 admissions provided by 273 full-time equivalent staff.

A new 20-bed mental health unit intended as a step-down service that provides rehabilitation for patients discharged from acute care services is currently under construction. Also being built is an adolescent mental health unit. The centre for referral of complex cases from Shellharbour is Wollongong Hospital. The hospital receives students from the University of New South Wales, and in 2008 a formal agreement was signed with the University of Wollongong graduate medical school.

== History ==
Shellharbour Hospital opened in 1986 by Neville Wran, after many years of lobbying and at a cost of A$22 million. The hospital provided medical and surgical services, and paediatric and maternity services were transferred to it from nearby Port Kembla Hospital. As the population of the area grew, the volume of services provided steadily increased and placed pressure on hospital services; in 2006, physician Chris Dunn said the hospital was under-resourced and there was a "staffing crisis."

In 2007 the Royal Australasian College of Physicians (RACP) revoked the hospital's accreditation for employing and teaching basic physician trainees due to inadequate supervision, as there were not enough senior staff employed. The hospital submitted a request to regain its status in 2008, and the RACP restored its training role for 12 months. 2008 also saw the opening of a new home birthing service and family care centre. The South Eastern Sydney and Illawarra Area Health Service has proposed to consolidate surgical services from nearby Bulli Hospital to Shellharbour from 2009.

== See also ==
- List of hospitals in Australia
