= Vivienne Newson =

Australian women's rights activist and editor

Viv Newson
- Born: Vivienne Elizabeth Dobney; 21 September 1891; Goulburn
- Died: 16 August 1973 (aged 81); Mosman
- Known for: leader in the UAW
- Spouse: Sergeant Basil William Newson

Vivienne Elizabeth (Viv) Newson born Vivienne Elizabeth Dobney (21 September 1891 – 16 August 1973) was an Australian women's rights activist and editor. She was vice-president of the United Associations (of Women) (UAW) and she edited a related news sheet from 1945 to a year before she died.

== Life ==
Newson was born in 1891 in Goulburn. Her parents were Agnes May Fleming (born Browning) and Thomas Dobney and she was their first child. She had five younger siblings and in 1900 they moved to Wagga Wagga. Her father was a commercial traveller.

She came to notice in 1933 when she joined the United Associations (of Women) (UAW) in 1933 and two years later she was elected to its executive. In 1941 the future prime minister Ben Chifley received a united deputation from a number of women's organisations. They were encouraging him to create a tax on men who were not married. This suggestion was made in preference to a proposal to introduce a new tax on the total income of married couples. The delegation was by Jessie Street, Erna Keighley, Edna Lillian Nelson and Newson.

In November 1941 she gave a talk on the Burma Road on ABC radio and this was reported in ABC Weekly. Her trip had been with Princess Hteiktin Ma Lat on a shooting expedition to Kutkai. She reported on the indigenous people she saw and the 160,000 people working to improve the road and its bamboo bridges.

In 1942 she became a vice-president on the UAW. She became the part-time editor of the nine issues of the Australian Women's Digest after it was launched in August 1944. She was very close to Jessie Street and she supported her when she contested the federal election. The Digest continued until 1947 but she continued to work on the UAW's Newsheets which she had begun privately in 1945 and it was available until 1972. Lucy Woodcock was a frequent collaborator and contributor, particularly regarding industrial related issues, as the publication supported the UAW's long campaign for equal pay. Newson died in a hospital in the Sydney suburb of Mosman in 1973.
