= George James Molle =

British soldier and lieutenant-governor

George James Molle (1773–1823) was a Scottish-born (Chirnside, Berwickshire) British soldier who served in India and as lieutenant-governor of Lieutenant-Governor of New South Wales (13 February 1814–12 September 1817). The Molle islands, part of the Whitsunday Islands, are named after him.
