= Louise Mackay =

Australian activist (1904–2001)

Louise Mackay (1904 – 2001) was an Australian activist and member of the Women's International League for Peace and Freedom. She was also a member of the Communist Party of Australia and the League of Women Voters in Victoria.

== Biography ==
Mackay was born in 1904. She was educated at Yarra Park State School and Melbourne High School.

Both her parents were aligned with the Australian Labour Party. However, around 1937, she was introduced to the Communist Party by artist friends in Sydney.

== Activism ==
Mackay became a member of the Communist Party of Australia and was involved with the Communist Party Central Education Committee. She also worked as a tutor in the Marx School, running classes on the Australian government and history. However, she was expelled from the party in 1952 for being "too critical".

She was also a member of the Women's International League for Peace and Freedom. In 1950, Mackay and fellow peace activist Jessie Street, travelled to England to participate in the World Peace Council's Second World Peace Congress, which was held in Warsaw. They were the only two women from New South Wales to attend.

Mackay was also a former president of the League of Women Voters in Victoria. In 1989, she wrote Women's sphere : a summary of the movement for women's electoral reform and representation in Victoria. This book included a brief life of Australian feminist and social activist Bessie Rischbieth and a short history of the League of Women Voters of Victoria.

In 1994, Mackay was interviewed by Ann Turner. In the interview, she spoke of her early life, her involvement with the Australian Communist Party, and her work during World War II. She also spoke of the difficulties she experienced after returning from the 2nd World Peace Congress, and her later work on behalf of the Peace Council and the Seamen's Union.

== Death and archives ==
Mackay died in 2001.

The papers of Louise Mackay are held at State Library Victoria and consist of letters, circulars, and press clippings related to the peace movement, women's rights, and Communism.

Biographical cuttings on Louise Mackay are held by the National Library of Australia.
