= Candelo, New South Wales =

Candelo
- Town
- Coordinates: 36°46′0″S 149°41′0″E
- Country: Australia
- State: New South Wales
- LGA: Bega Valley Shire
- Location: 448 km (278 mi) SSW of Sydney; 217 km (135 mi) SE of Canberra; 23 km (14 mi) SW of Bega; 38 km (24 mi) NW of Eden
- Established: 1860s

Government
  - State electorate: Bega
  - Federal division: Eden-Monaro

Population
  - Total: 780 (2021 census census)
- Postcode: 2550

Candelo is a town in south-eastern New South Wales, Australia. It is in the Bega Valley Shire local government area, 448 kilometres (278 mi) south of the state capital, Sydney and 23 kilometres (14 mi) north-west of the popular coastal holiday destination of Merimbula. In 2021, Candelo had a population of 780 people. Candelo was named by Peter Imlay, the first European settler in the area, who named his original 1834 house "Candelo House" after the town of Candelo, Italy.

The area around Candelo was first settled by Europeans in the 1830s, and the village was developed in the 1860s at a crossroads, following the passage of the New South Wales Land Act of 1861 which allowed closer settlement.

Candelo hosts notable community events such as the Candelo Village Festival, a biennial music and arts festival. The inaugural festival was held in 2008.

The Candelo Show, held every January, is an agricultural and horticultural exhibition event that has been running since 1883.

Candelo Markets are held on the first Sunday of the month, and have been running since 1982. They exist primarily to fund community projects in the Candelo area.

Sapphire Speedway is a 600m clay/granite mix track near Candelo. The divisions run at the track include RSA Limited Sedans, SSA Production Sedans, Junior Sedans and Dirt Karts.

== Notable people ==
Edna Lillian Nelson, an expert in venereal diseases, was born here in 1896.
