= Jessie Street Gardens =

Urban park in Sydney, New South Wales, Australia

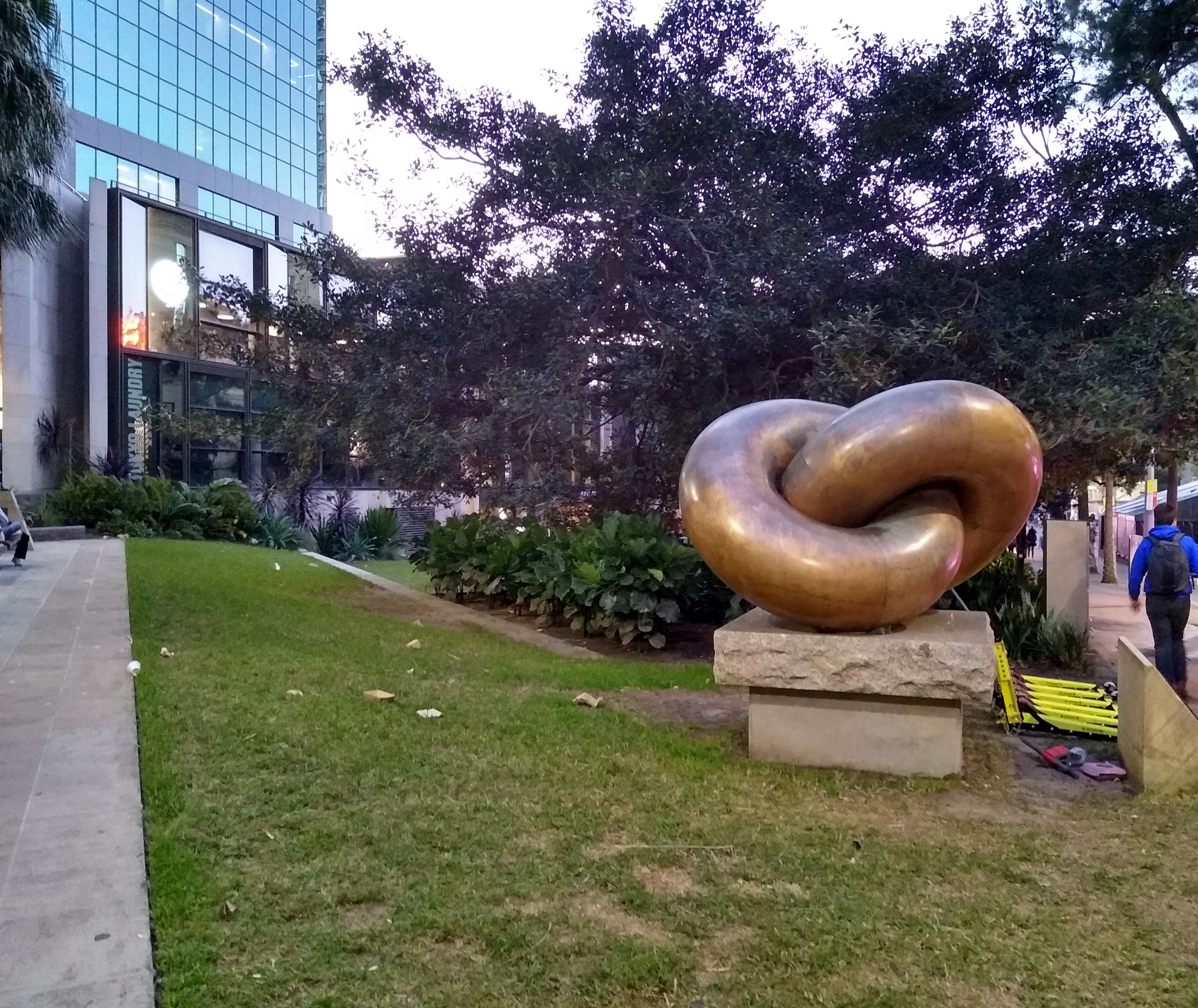

- Location within Sydney
- Type: Urban park
- Location: Loftus Street, Sydney central business district, near Circular Quay, Sydney, New South Wales, Australia
- Coordinates: 33°51′45″S 151°12′37″E
- Opened: 7 December 1990 (by Lady Candy Bingham)
- Operator: City of Sydney
- Status: Open all year

The Jessie Street Gardens is an urban park in Loftus Street, in the Sydney central business district, near Circular Quay, Sydney, New South Wales, Australia. The park is named in honour of Jessie Street, a leading Australian women's rights activist.

The park was developed in 1989 from empty land remaining after the demolition of the Goldsborough Mort wool brokers building. It was provisionally named Gateway Park. When the official naming of the park was discussed, two suggestions were made: Street, and Mary Reibey. The Geographical Names Board of New South Wales approved Street's name and the park was duly renamed in 1990.

The gardens were officially opened on 7 December 1990 by Lady Candy Bingham, the wife of Jeremy Bingham, the Lord Mayor of Sydney at the time. Street's son Sir Laurence Street was also present. Within the gardens stand the Pioneer Women's Memorial, and the NSW Ex-Servicewomen's Memorial.

== See also ==
- List of parks in Sydney
