= Erna Keighley =

British born leader of women in Australia

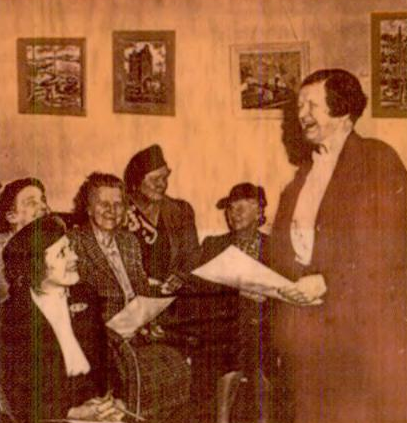
- Jessie Street and the United Associations of Women (Keighley is second from left)
- Born: Erna Laura Saloman; 25 June 1891; Manningham, Bradford, UK
- Died: 16 July 1955 (aged 64); Clifton Gardens, New South Wales, Australia
- Known for: Women's rights leadership
- Spouse: Albert William Keighley
- Children: 2

Erna Laura Keighley (née Saloman; 25 June 1891 – 16 July 1955) was a British-born activist in Australia.

== Life ==
Keighley was born in Manningham near Bradford, England in 1891. Her parents were Josephine Maria (born Jussen) and her husband, Gustav Salomon. Her father was a shipping merchant. She was educated locally at Belle Vue girls' school.

She arrived in Sydney in 1930 with her two children. Her husband, who she had married in Yorkshire, twelve years before was a partner in cotton mills in the Sydney suburb of Camperdown. The business had been started by her husband, Albert William Keighley, and his brother, Frank, and it was called Bradford Cotton Mills Ltd. Albert had other business interests including Westminster Carpets Pty Ltd.

The United Associations of Women (UAW) had been formed in 1929 by radical feminists who were disappointed by the progress made by similar organisations. Its founders included Linda Littlejohn, Ruby Rich, Adela Pankhurst Walsh and Jessie Street. Keighley joined and she became firm friends with Jessie Street.

In 1941 the future prime minister Ben Chifley received a united deputation from a number of women's organisations. They were encouraging him to create a tax on men who were not married. This suggestion was made in preference to a proposal to introduce a new tax on the total income of married couples. The delegation was by Jessie Street, Vivienne Newson, Edna Lillian Nelson and Keighley.

In 1942, she became President of the UAW and she took an interest in equal pay. She and Jessie Street went to visit the minister, Arthur Drakeford, on 25 March 1942 to discuss the demand for equal pay. Women were taking up jobs that had previously been done by just men and the UAW wanted the government to pass legislation to prevent lower wages being offered. A Women's Employment Board was established which would rule on disputes. In general the new board recommended that women should be paid 90% of the wage offered to men. Keighley also became involved in trying to establish the rights and nationality of women and their children after an Australian woman married an American soldier. The American's replied that they discouraged these marriages. However it was apparent that the question had not been considered. Women married "at their own risk" and their status would be worked out after the war ended.

The UAW organised the Australian Women's Charter Conference in 1943. The "Australian Women’s Conference For Victory in War and Victory in Peace" was convened in Sydney in 1943.

In 1945, she was in London where she went to meetings with Jessie Street. Street had arranged for the "Australian Women's Register" to be distributed in the Americas and Keighley negotiated a similar deal for the UK with the stationers W.H.Smith.

In 1949, her husband who still managing director of Bradford Cotton Mills Ltd died leaving over £200,000. He left their home to her and interest from the estate for life. Their son, William, was to receive three quarters of the estate after her death and their daughter was to receive a quarter. Their daughter, Sylvia, was married to the tennis professional Adrian Quist.

Keighley died in 1955, aged 64, in Clifton Gardens.
