= Australian Dispute Resolution Association =

Organization in Sydney, Australia

ADRA - Australian Dispute Resolution Association Inc.
- Founded: 1986
- Type: Professional Mediator Association
- Purpose: mediation and alternative dispute resolution ADR
- Location: Sydney, New South Wales
- Product: professional member services, lobbying, and advocacy
- Key people: Dr Katherine Pavlidis Johnson, President; Helen Miedzinski, Vice-President; Margaret McCue, Treasurer; Abe Quadan, Secretary; Marilyn Waugh, Communications.
- Website: www.adra.net.au

The Australian Dispute Resolution Association (ADRA) is a professional mediator's body formed in 1986. It is headquartered in Sydney, Australia.

Under the Australian NMAS (National Mediator Accreditation System), ADRA is recognized by the Mediator Standards Board (MSB) as an authorized mediator accreditation body.

== Purpose ==
ADRA was originally formed by litigation lawyers and allied professionals to promote mediation and alternative dispute resolution (ADR) as alternatives to conventional, adversarial litigation. It is written that this was "at a time when there was a very strong lawyer bias against mediation" in Australia.

== Organizational patrons ==
The original patron of ADRA was the 14th Chief Justice of the Supreme Court of New South Wales and Lieutenant-Governor of New South Wales Sir Laurence Street. ADRA's current patron is prominent Australian judge and former politician Terry Sheahan AO.

The Law Society of New South Wales is an ADRA sponsor.

== Early role in promoting mediation and ADR thought in Australia ==
In terms of promoting mediation and alternative dispute resolution in Australia, ADRA was instrumental in the formation of today's respected and well-known Australasian Dispute Resolution Journal (ADRJ) - a regular Journal containing articles on non-adjudicative processes.

The ADRJ was first published by ADRA as a two-page circular and then in February 1990 as a quarterly journal under the ADJR name and expressed as being 'in association with' ADRA. The ADRJ continues to be published by Thomson Reuters, a multinational media conglomerate.

== Lobbying efforts ==
ADRA has historically been active in lobbying Governments, including: - to better facilitate the use of mediation and alternative dispute resolution processes to improve access to justice and outcomes; - for Australia's entry into the United Nations Convention on International Settlement Agreements Resulting from Mediation, otherwise known as the Singapore Convention on Mediation, to which 53 nations including the United States of America, China and India are signatory to.

Recently, ADRA initiated the formation of a peak dispute resolution body for the dispute resolution industry, the Council for Australian Dispute Resolvers (CADR), to provide a facilitative focal point for member group consultation with Government about the mutual needs and concerns of DR Industry, both on a national and international level.

== International initiatives ==
ADRA members have assisted in nation building ADR initiatives overseas. In Mongolia, ADRA worked with the Judicial Council of Mongolia and the National Family, Youth and Child Development Authority, to train mediators and judges, in furtherance of the Mongolia's ratification of the Convention on the Rights of the Child.

== Recognition ==
In July 2021 a function at NSW Parliament was held to celebrate ADRA's 36th year in operation.
