= Edna Lillian Nelson =

Australian medical practitioner

- Born: Edna Lillian Smith; 17 November 1896; Candelo
- Died: 25 February 1948 (aged 51); Sydney Hospital
- Education: University of Sydney
- Occupation: doctor
- Employer: Rachel Forster Hospital
- Spouse: William Thomas Nelson
- Children: four

Edna Lillian Nelson, born Edna Lillian Smith (1896–1948) was an Australian medical practitioner. She specialised in venereal diseases in the women's hospital in Sydney.

== Life ==
Nelson was born in Candelo in New South Wales in 1896. Her English immigrant parents were Lillian (born Cordingly) and Wright Smith. She was their fifth child. Her father was a teacher and she attended Sydney Girls' High School where she excelled at botany and English. She went on to study medicine at the University of Sydney graduating with a first class degree and a prize reserved for women candidates.

She and her husband moved to Kalgoorlie in Western Australia after they married in 1924.

In 1936 she returned to Sydney where became the director of their venereal diseases department at the Rachel Forster Hospital. The clinic had been founded by Elsie Dalyell and Marie Montgomerie Hamilton in 1927. She left for further post-grad study in Europe in 1939. She managed to visit Copenhagen, Stockholm, Edinburgh and London but she soon returned because of the war. She made the decision that from then she wanted to work on a part-time basis. In 1943 she became a consultant. The changes required by the war were an opportunity for her. She had her own practise and in 1941 she started to treat skin diseases and in 1943 she became the leading physician for this speciality.

In 1941 the future prime minister Ben Chifley received a united deputation from a number of women's organisations. They were encouraging him to create a tax on men who were not married. This suggestion was made in preference to a proposal to introduce a new tax on the total income of married couples. The delegation was by Jessie Street, Vivienne Newson, Erna Keighley and Nelson.

In 1942 she had made the comment that men returning from the Middle East theatre of World War II to Australia were infecting women with sexually transmitted diseases. The Daily Examiner reported an "Army spokesman" who said that there was "no evidence" and he assured the paper that the army took the greatest care to prevent men becoming infected. The story in the press was titled "Not Supported".

Nelson died in 1948 in Sydney Hospital. She was survived by her husband, William Thomas Nelson, and their four sons.
