= Jack Fingleton =

Australian cricketer and journalist (1908–1981)

Jack Fingleton, OBE
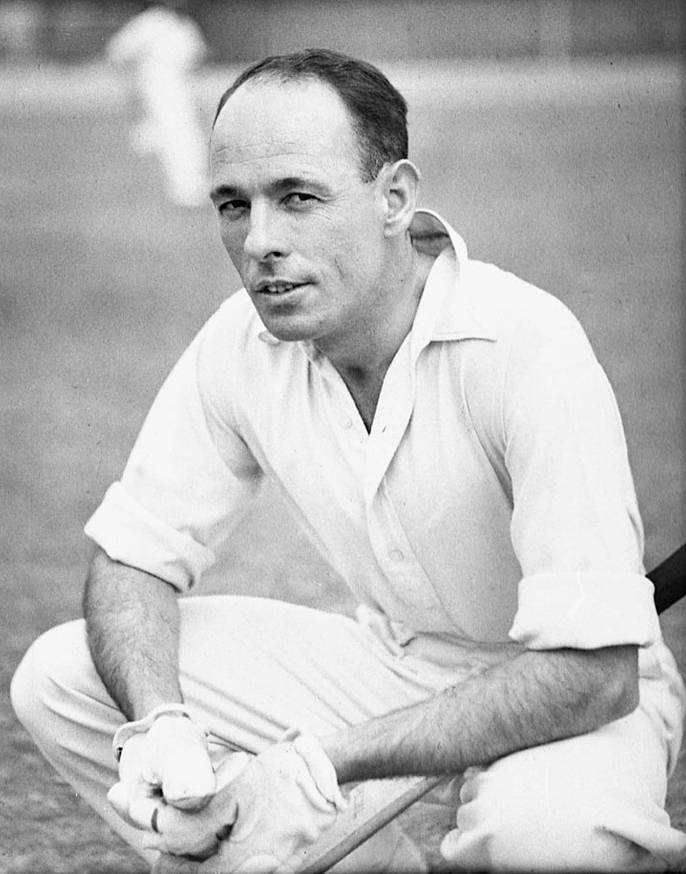

Personal information
- Full name: John Henry Webb Fingleton
- Born: 28 April 1908; Waverley, New South Wales, Australia
- Died: 22 November 1981 (aged 73); St Leonards, New South Wales, Australia
- Batting: Right-handed

International information
- National side: Australia
- Test debut (cap 142): 12 February 1932 v South Africa
- Last Test: 24 August 1938 v England

Domestic team information
- Years: Team
- 1928–1940: New South Wales

Career statistics
Competition	Test	First-class
Matches	18	108
Runs scored	1,189	6,816
Batting average	42.46	44.54
100s/50s	5/3	22/31
Top score	136	167
Balls bowled	0	91
Wickets	–	2
Bowling average	–	27.00
5 wickets in innings	–	0
10 wickets in match	–	0
Best bowling	–	1/6
Catches/stumpings	13/–	81/4
- Source: Cricinfo, 26 December 2008

John Henry Webb Fingleton, OBE (28 April 1908 – 22 November 1981) was an Australian Test cricketer, journalist and commentator. He was the son of Australian politician James Fingleton, and he was known for his dour defensive approach as a batsman, scoring five Test match centuries, representing Australia in 18 Tests between 1932 and 1938.

He made his first-grade debut in Sydney district cricket at the age of 16 and proceeded to his first-class debut for New South Wales at the age of 20 in 1928–29. In 1931–32, Fingleton gained a regular position for New South Wales. He then made his debut in the Fifth and final Test of the season against South Africa, making 40 in an innings victory. The following season, Fingleton won praise for an unbeaten century against the bodyline attack in a tour match despite suffering multiple bruises and being accused of leaking the infamous verbal exchange between Australian captain Bill Woodfull and English manager Plum Warner during the acrimonious Ashes.

Fingleton scored four centuries and was the leading run-scorer during the 1934–35 domestic season, earning a recall to the Australian team for the 1935–36 tour of South Africa. From that point onwards until the outbreak of World War II, he opened the batting with Bill Brown. At his height, Fingleton was scoring centuries in three consecutive innings as Australia won each of the last three Tests by an innings. In the Fourth Test, he and Brown put on the first double century opening partnership for Australia in a Test. In 1936–37, Fingleton made a century in the First Test to become the first player to score consecutive centuries in four Test innings.

Fingleton enlisted in the military during World War II and was eventually sent to work on media matters for Prime Minister John Curtin and one of his predecessors, Billy Hughes. After the war, Fingleton worked as a political correspondent in Canberra and commentated on cricket during the summer months in Australia and England. He was a prolific author, regarded as one of the finest and most stylish cricket writers of his time, producing many books. Fingleton was known for his forthright opinions and willingness to criticise, especially regarding his colleague Don Bradman, and his cricket reports were published by newspapers in several countries.

== Style ==
A right-hand opening batsman, Fingleton was noted primarily for his obdurate defense rather than for his strokeplay. Like most successful opening batsmen, he had a small back-lift and was rarely surprised by the quicker half-volley or yorker. Fingleton was often described as "courageous", in particular for his defiant batting against Bodyline. Fingleton often made self-deprecating comments about his batting, telling English cricket writer Alan Gibson that he "missed nothing" by not seeing him bat. He was also an athletic and gifted fieldsman, who built his reputation in the covers.

Later he became noted along with Vic Richardson and Bill Brown in South Africa in 1935–36 as part of Bill O'Reilly's leg-trap. Neville Cardus, once described the Fingleton-Brown combination as "crouching low and acquisitively, each with as many arms as an Indian god". His partnership with Brown was regarded as one of the great opening pairings in the history of Australian Test cricket. In ten Tests together as an opening partnership, the pair averaged 63.75 for the first wicket, higher than any other Australian pair with more than 1,000 runs.

== Early years ==
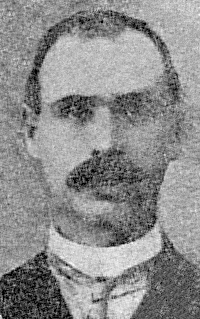
Fingleton's father James served in the New South Wales parliament

Born at Waverley in the inner eastern suburbs of Sydney, Fingleton was the third of six children. His parents were James, a tram driver and union organiser who became a member of the New South Wales Parliament, and Belinda May Webb. The family was Irish Catholic—Fingleton's paternal grandfather had immigrated to Australia in the 1870s.

In 1913, at the age of five, Fingleton's father was elected into state parliament as a representative of the centre left, labour-union oriented Australian Labor Party, and the family moved into a larger house. It was here that Fingleton learned to play street cricket. Fingleton was educated at the Roman Catholic St Francis's School, in the inner city suburb of Paddington before moving to Waverley College. There he began a lifelong association with prose.

In 1917, the family fell upon hard times when the elder Fingleton lost his seat and resumed his job as a tram driver, but in 1918 contracted tuberculosis. The father succumbed in 1920 when Jack was twelve, and the funeral director was Australian Test wicket-keeper Sammy Carter.

Without their breadwinner, the Fingleton family were in further trouble and Belinda opened a seafood shop and withdrew her eldest son Les to support her. However, the business failed and the family home was at risk, so Jack was forced to quit school at the age of 12. He did a variety of jobs such as selling food at cinemas, washing bottles and sweeping floors.

At the age of fifteen, Fingleton took the first steps in his journalism career, when his cousin helped him to become a copy boy with the now defunct Sydney Daily Guardian. Encouraged by his former headmaster, who had prompted his interest in writing, Fingleton quickly eased into his new career. Fingleton started as a sports reporter, and had a narrow escape when he was sacked by Robert Clyde Packer for breaking a pot, but then reinstated. Fingleton then risked being fired by removing cricket articles written by the famed Neville Cardus from the newspaper's archive against policy for his personal use.

Fingleton was unable to distinguish himself on the field while at school, but after joining Waverley, he made quick progress. Fingleton trained early in the morning, before heading to the office and working in the afternoon so that the articles would be printed in the evening. He was unable to afford the club membership so a patron sponsored him. At the age of 16, he broke into the First XI of a grade team which included Test players Alan Kippax, Hanson Carter and Arthur Mailey. Australian Test captain Herbie Collins missed a match due to his work as a bookmaker, and Fingleton stood in at late notice. Under the leadership of Carter, Fingleton batted last and made 11 not out. Forced to follow on, he made 52 not out and cemented his position for the remainder of the season. Within a year, Fingleton's grade performances were being reported in Sydney newspapers. Playing on a Waverley pitch notorious for uneven bounce, Fingleton developed a style of play centred on solid defence.

In the same year, his journalistic mentor Pedlar Palmer moved to the Sydney Morning Herald and Fingleton became disenchanted. He was coaxed by a cricketer-journalist to move to his publication, the Telegraph Pictorial, where he worked for several years before the outbreak of the Second World War. However, Fingleton's initiation into his new workplace was difficult as the Telegraph Pictorial had just merged with the Daily Telegraph and around half the workforce were to be made redundant. Fingleton was demoted from the main staff to a freelance correspondent covering events in the inner-city suburbs of Redfern and Newtown. In such crime-ridden and turbulent working-class area, Fingleton was productive in break stories and was soon restored to the regular staff.

== First-class debut ==
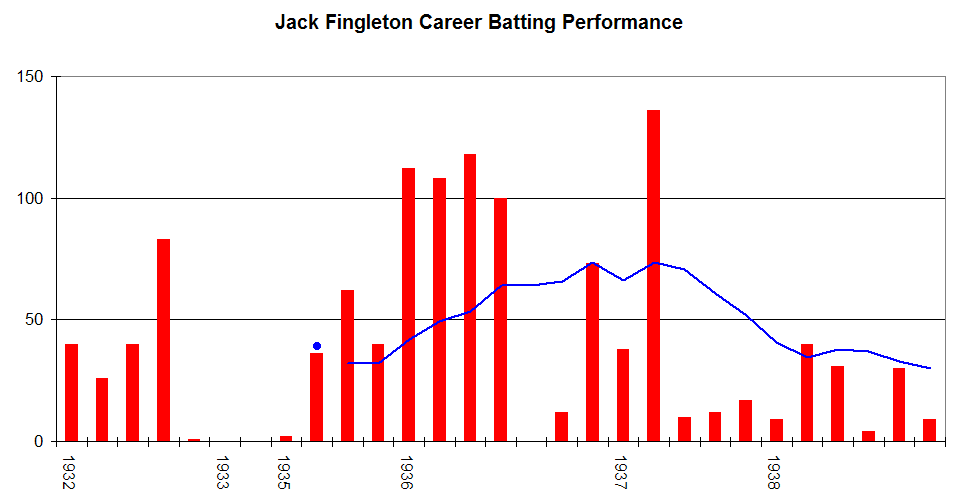
Jack Fingleton's Test career batting performance. The red bars indicate the runs that he scored in an innings, with the blue line indicating the batting average in his last ten innings. The blue dots indicate an innings where he remained not out.

Having scored a century for Waverley against Petersham the week before, Fingleton made his first-class debut in 1928–29, playing in two matches and having two innings. On debut against Victoria, Fingleton was allowed to bat no higher than No. 8 by captain Tommy Andrews, despite being a specialist batsman. More than 600 runs had been scored by the time the sixth wicket had fallen, bringing him to the wicket to join Don Bradman, who had already brought up his double century. The pair put on an unbroken stand of 111 before Andrews declared at 7/613, of which Fingleton made 25 not out. During the partnership, Bradman farmed most of the strike, much to Fingleton's chagrin. The pair's first meeting had been prickly and Bradman glared angrily at Fingleton after a mix-up almost ended in a run out. The match was drawn, and Fingleton then made a duck against Tasmania in an innings victory. The following summer, with no Test matches, New South Wales' international representatives were available for the entire season, and Fingleton missed selection for every match.

In 1930–31, aged 22, Fingleton regained his position at the start of the Sheffield Shield season for New South Wales, and first came to prominence when he withstood a ferocious opening spell against the express pace of Eddie Gilbert in Brisbane against Queensland. On one occasion, a particularly fast Gilbert delivery supposedly evaded both the batsman and wicket-keeper, travelled more than 60 metres and crashed through a fence before hitting and killing a dog on the other side. Fingleton scored 56 as a full strength team with Test players fell for 143. The visitors were set 392 for victory and played for a draw, with Fingleton adding 71 to prevent a collapse as the match was saved. He failed to pass single figures in his next four innings, and was dropped twice, before adding 32 not out and 26 as New South Wales lost to the touring West Indies. Fingleton did not play a full season and ended with 210 runs at 35.00 in five matches, including the two half-centuries.

== Test debut ==
In the opening match of the 1931–32 season, which was against Queensland, New South Wales were in trouble. Gilbert famously knocked the bat out of Donald Bradman's hand, before removing him for a duck. Gilbert cut down the New South Wales top order with a spell of 3/12 and forced Alan Kippax to retire hurt after hitting him in the upper body. Fingleton was going to be twelfth man before Archie Jackson—who was to die of tuberculosis just over a year later—collapsed just before the start of the match. Undeterred, Stan McCabe came in and counterattacked; Fingleton assisted him with a stubborn 93 and featured in a 195-run fourth wicket partnership. New South Wales reached 432 and won by an innings.

Fingleton then scored his maiden first-class century of 117 in less than four hours in the following match, against the touring South Africa, helping his team to 3/430 in their runchase. The hosts were 18 runs short of victory when time ran out. Although Fingleton made only five in New South Wales' second match against the South Africans, Fingleton was selected for the Test series against the same team. This came after only ten matches for his state. Starting with the Second Test, he was twelfth man for three consecutive Tests, and as a result, did not play any cricket for six weeks before he added a pair of 40s in a win over arch-rivals Victoria.

Fingleton made his debut in the Fifth and final Test in similar circumstances to his break at the start of the season; Bill Ponsford fell ill and Bradman twisted an ankle. As Bradman later took a hard-running catch as a substitute fielder on the same day, some suspected that he had feigned injury to avoid playing on a rain-affected wicket hostile to batting—he had appeared uncomfortable against aggressive bowling in the previous Test. In a low-scoring match, Fingleton's first action on the field was to let a ball go between his legs as South Africa batted first. Opening with captain Bill Woodfull in the absence of Ponsford, Fingleton saw his skipper removed from the first ball of the innings. He was allowed to ease into his first innings when the first ball he faced, from Neville Quinn, was a deliberate full toss to give him an opportunity to score his initial runs easily. The pair became friends from this point onwards. Fingleton was second top-scorer with 40 as Australia made 153 recorded an innings victory. The match lasted less than one day's playing time as the hosts fell for only 36 and 45. The cricketer-journalist Richard Whitington later wrote that "for courage and skill...[Fingleton's 51] was worth quadruple that number". The Sydney Mail predicted that Fingleton's display on the rain-affected wicket, the likes of which were common, proved that he would "someday be a great success" there. Fingleton ended the season with 386 runs at 42.88 with one century and a fifty in six matches.

== Bodyline turmoil ==
In the following summer came the Bodyline series, when England toured under Douglas Jardine and targeted the upper bodies of the Australian batsmen with short-pitched bowling, using a close leg side cordon to catch balls fended away from the body. In one of the tour matches before the Tests, Fingleton scored a defiant 119*, carrying his bat for New South Wales against the bumper barrage of Harold Larwood and Gubby Allen, ensuring his selection for the First Test. Despite his unbending resistance, his state fell to an innings defeat. In a warm-up for the Tests, he scored 29 and 53 not out for an Australian XI against the tourists, while most of his teammates struggled. His earlier experience held him in good stead as he scored 26 and 40 as Australia were crushed by ten wickets in the First Test in Sydney. Fingleton stood his ground and was hit several times. He then made a defiant four-hour innings to top-score with 83 in the first innings of Australia's only win of the series in the Second Test in Melbourne, although he did run out his batting partner Leo O'Brien in the process. This helped the Australians to reach 228 and they took a 59-run first innings lead before winning the match despite Fingleton making only one in the second innings. He appeared as well equipped as any Australian to combat England's strategy.

=== Adelaide leak ===
However, the Third Test at the Adelaide Oval was disastrous for Fingleton, who scored a pair as Australia were hammered by 338 runs. He was blamed for leaking the details of the dressing room exchange between captain Bill Woodfull and English manager Plum Warner, which almost caused the abandonment of the Test series. Warner had visited Woodfull to express sympathies after the Australian captain was struck in the heart by Larwood's short pitched bowling, to which Woodfull retorted "I do not want to see you Mr. Warner. There are two sides out there. One is playing cricket and the other is not." The leak caused a sensation, as Woodfull had publicly remained composed in the face of the body barrage, neither complaining nor retaliating. Fingleton was dropped for the remaining two Tests of the series. New South Wales played England after the Third Test and Fingleton had a chance to show his credentials against Bodyline but made only 19 and 7 in a four-wicket defeat, and was unable to force his way back into the Test team. Fingleton always denied responsibility for the leak, blaming Bradman.

The Bodyline season also marked the beginning of Fingleton's opening combination with Bill Brown, who made his New South Wales debut in the same season. Fingleton scored four half-centuries for the remainder of the first-class season and ended with 648 runs at 38.11 as New South Wales won the Sheffield Shield.

Fingleton had a prolific 1933–34 Australian season in which he scored 655 runs at 59.54 with two centuries and four fifties. He scored 105 in the Test trial for Richardson's XI and then struck 145 against arch-rivals Victoria in the last match of the season; New South Wales were unable to force a victory and thus ceded the Sheffield Shield to their southern neighbours. He had scored 76 in the return match earlier in the season and added 33 and 78 against the Rest of Australia.

Despite this, Fingleton was overlooked for the Australian side selected to tour England in 1934. With captain Woodfull and Bill Ponsford the established openers, there was only one place for a spare opener, and Brown won the position over his partner, who had performed to a similar standard during the season. The selectors asked Don Bradman, Australia's leading batsman and state teammate to Brown and Fingleton, for advice. Bradman nominated Brown, believing that his style was better suited to English pitches. On the day that the team was selected, Bradman wrote in his newspaper column, criticising Fingleton's running between the wickets. When the pair next met, Fingleton's only words were to blame Bradman for his omission; Bradman claimed that as a result of the selection controversy, Fingleton relentlessly pursued a vendetta against him from there on. Fingleton also suspected that Woodfull wanted him out of the team because he held the journalist responsible for the leaked exchange with Warner.

Some incidents in Fingleton's century in the last match of the season were also believed to have reflected badly at the selection table. Having retired hurt on 78, he returned the next day and was then dropped on 86 in the slips. Fingleton had moved out of his crease to pat out the pitch before the ball had gone dead and Victorian wicket-keeper Ben Barnett broke the stumps. A displeased Fingleton was given out by umpire George Borwick and walked off the ground, only to be called back by captain Woodfull. Fingleton refused Woodfull's offer and did not return until Woodfull successfully asked Borwick to reverse his decision. The media reported that Fingleton had quarrelled with Woodfull and several teammates told him that his apparent rebuff of the national captain would prejudice his chances of selection, and the NSWCA made an inquiry into the matter; Fingleton failed to respond. During the same innings, Bradman also wrote in his newspaper report that Fingleton had been responsible for the run out of teammate Ray Rowe, which angered Fingleton for an extended period.

A disappointed Fingleton wrote to Woodfull, saying "You have chosen chaps who do not like fast bowling". He also questioned what he perceived to be Woodfull's coldness towards him since the Bodyline series and decried unnamed "fellow pressmen, naturally jealous". Wisden speculated that Fingleton's omission may have been due to cricket diplomacy reasons following the incident in Adelaide, while others thought that regionalism was to blame; this view posited that Ernest Bromley was selected so that seven Victorians and New South Welshmen would be on the tour. Bromley scored only 312 runs in 20 innings in England.

Fingleton was selected for a second string Australian team to tour New Zealand for two months at the end of the season while the Test team departed for England. However, captain Victor Richardson and his deputy Keith Rigg withdrew, dissatisfied with the pay, leaving Fingleton as the most senior member of the team. The tour was then cancelled by New Zealand, who feared that the large number of absentees would result in a large financial loss.

== Test recall ==
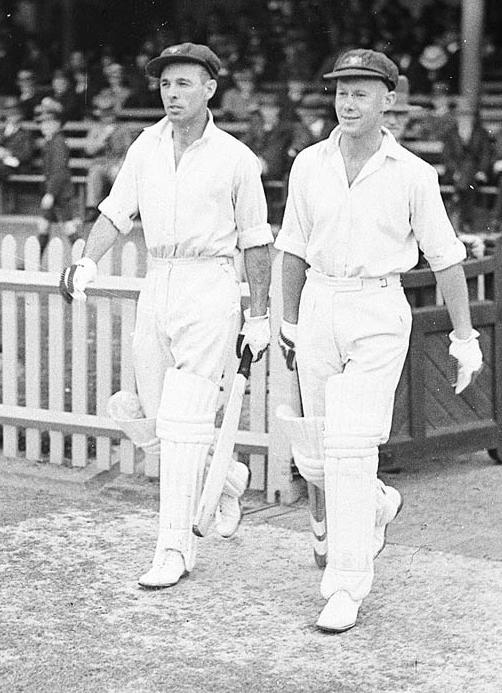
Fingleton and Brown walk out to open for Australia

With retirements of both Woodfull and Ponsford following the 1934 tour to England, positions at the top of the Australia's batting order became available. Fingleton also found state cricket more attractive now that Bradman had decided to move to South Australia to take up stockbroking. Fingleton responded to his omission from the Ashes tour by leading the run-scoring aggregates in the 1934–35 season. He scored 880 runs at 58.66 with four centuries and four fifties, almost 200 runs more than the second most prolific batsman, Brown. After Fingleton started the summer with a fifty in Woodfull's testimonial match, the pair started the Shield campaign with a 249-run stand in New South Wales' first match of the season against South Australia, both scoring centuries in an innings victory. Fingleton made 134 in just over three hours. Fingleton reached 49 at least once in the remaining five matches, including a 108 against Queensland. Despite the form of the openers, New South Wales failed to win the Sheffield Shield after losing both of their matches against Victoria. Fingleton ended the season with consecutive centuries, 124 and 100, against Western Australia, and took the first of two first-class wickets in his career in the first of the two matches.

As a result of his performances, Fingleton was recalled to the Test team for the tour of South Africa in 1935–36, where he partnered Brown at the top of the innings. Under normal circumstances, the Australians would have been captained by Fingleton's rival Bradman, who had been vice-captain to Woodfull. However, Bradman was unable to tour for medical reasons and Vic Richardson led the team instead. With Bradman out of the way, the tour was to be the most prolific and peaceful phase of Fingleton's international career and included several large opening stands with Brown. During the tour, Fingleton played with an attacking flair that contrasted with his established reputation for doggedness. For Fingleton, it was the happiest tour he had been on, in large part due to Bradman's absence.

Fingleton nearly failed to make the trip. His newspaper editor Eric Baume ordered him to write a column attacking the Australian Board of Control for vetoing players from going on a private tour of India, threatening to sack him if he refused—criticism of the board typically resulted in exclusion from selection. Fingleton was reluctant to comply, and was reprieved when the editor-in-chief overruled Baume.

Fingleton scored 66 for the Australians in an innings victory over Western Australia before sailing for South Africa. It was to be the start of a very productive campaign. In the three matches leading up to the Tests, against Natal, Western Province and Transvaal respectively, Fingleton scored 121, 53, 99 and seven not out. Australia won the latter match by ten wickets and the others by an innings. In the match by Natal, Fingleton and Brown both made centuries and combined in a double century stand.

After almost three years in the wilderness, Fingleton returned to the Test arena in the First Test at Durban. After making two in the first innings, he was unbeaten on 36 when Australia reached their second innings target with nine wickets in hand. During the first innings, a 140 km/h gale hit the ground, uprooting trees and forcing balls that were heading into the wind to do U-turns. He followed this with 62—the innings top-score—and 40 in the Second Test at Johannesburg. After taking a 93-run first innings lead, Australia needed a Test record of 399 in the second innings to win on a turning wicket, and after the early demise of Brown, Fingleton joined McCabe in a 177-run partnership that pushed the score to 1/194. Such was the dominance of McCabe that he scored more than 80% of the runs during this partnership. Australia needed only 125 with half the day remaining and eight wickets in hand when poor visibility ended play. McCabe had flayed the attack and reached 189 not out when the South Africans had the match called off, claiming that the fieldsmen were endangered by the batsman's vigorous hitting.

Fingleton finished the series with centuries in each of the last three Tests, all in consecutive innings; 112 at Cape Town, 108 at Johannesburg and 118 in Durban. In the Third Test, Fingleton and Brown set a new Australian Test record opening stand of 233, which laid the foundation for a total of 8/362 declared and an innings victory. It was Australia's first double-century opening stand in Test cricket, and remains a national record for the first wicket against South Africa. On a rain-affected wicket, Fingleton reached his maiden Test century in only 180 minutes before wickets began falling steadily.

Before the Fourth Test, Fingleton added 52 against Border and 110 in an innings win over Transvaal. His 108 in the Fourth Test was more than South Africa's entire second innings of 98, and scored at almost a run a minute. In the Fifth Test, the pair combined for another century stand. Each of the three matches resulted in an innings victory for Australia as the series was taken 4–0. Fingleton ended the Test series with 478 runs at 79.66. Against Natal at Durban, he made his highest first class score of 167, his second century against the provincial side for the season. He ended the tour with a total of 1192 runs at 74.50, including six centuries. Despite his rapid scoring in South Africa, Fingleton's achievements went largely unheralded at home; at the time, England and Australia were by far the strongest Test teams and media coverage of the tour was scant. There was little detail in the reports apart from the scores and Fingleton was still described as a slow scorer, something that angered him.

== Under the captaincy of Bradman ==
The following 1936–37 season in Australia, saw more success for Fingleton, although with the return of Bradman as captain, team harmony became strained. Gubby Allen's Englishmen toured Australia, and after failing to pass 10 in his first three innings for the season, Fingleton scored 39, 42 and 56 in matches for New South Wales and an Australian XI against the tourists.

Fingleton became the first player to score centuries in four consecutive Test innings when he scored 100 in the first innings of the First Test at Brisbane, reaching the milestone on 7 December. He top-scored as Australia replied to England's 358 with 234. Fingleton's feats was later equalled by Alan Melville, (whose four centuries were scored on either side of World War II) and surpassed by the West Indian, Everton Weekes in 1948–49. Fingleton's run ended in the second innings, falling for a golden duck as Australia were skittled for 58 on a sticky wicket and crushed by 322 runs.

After scoring 12 in a total of 80 as Australia were caught on a sticky wicket, Fingleton then made 73 in the second innings of the Second Test in Sydney, one of few Australians to resist as the home side fell to an innings defeat after being forced to follow on. Australia were facing a dilemma in the Third Test in Melbourne. The home team scored 200, Fingleton contributing 38, before rain caused a sticky wicket and England declared at 9/76. However, Australia still had to bat on the treacherous surface, captain Bradman reshuffled the batting lineup, putting the bowlers in first and Fingleton and himself in at Nos. 6 and 7 to save them for more favourable batting conditions. The bowlers managed to survive to the end of the day's play and the wicket improved overnight. The pair came together with the score at 5/97 and made a Test record sixth-wicket partnership of 346, with Fingleton making 136. It turned the Test and saw Australia ended at 564. The hosts bowled England out for 323 to win the match by 365 runs and prevent England from taking an unassailable 3–0 lead. Fingleton did not pass 20 in his last three innings of the series, as Australia won the remaining two matches to win the series. Fingleton ended with 398 runs at 44.22 in the Tests, and 631 runs at 33.21 overall.

Fingleton followed up with 862 runs at 50.70 in the 1937–38 domestic season, with two centuries and six fifties. This effort placed him third in the run-scoring aggregates for the season. He saved his best for arch-rivals Victoria, scoring 59 and 160 to salvage a draw after New South Wales had conceded a first innings lead of 231. New south Wales went on to win the title. Fingleton finished his season with 66, 1, 47 and 109 in two warm-up matches for the Australian team against Western Australia before they headed to England for the 1938 Ashes series.

In 1938, Fingleton made what turned out to be his international farewell as Australia toured England, a series in which he found runs difficult to come by. He later attributed this to his inability to play the pull shot. However, Fingleton started the tour well. He passed 30 in each of his first seven innings on English soil, and converted three of these starts into centuries, scoring 124 against Oxford University, 111 against Cambridge University and 123 not out against Hampshire in the first month of cricket. Fingleton's form tapered just at the wrong time, falling three times for single figures in the last two matches before the Tests. He carried this into the First Test at Trent Bridge, where he made only 9 and 40 in a high-scoring draw in which every innings passed 400.

An infamous incident occurred in Australia's second innings. As Australia were 247 runs behind on the first innings and forced to follow on, they played for a draw and Brown and Fingleton batted slowly in the second innings. Sections of the crowd heckled his slow batting by using a slow hand clap. Bradman then sent Mervyn Waite out to deliver orders to the openers that they should back away from their positions and hold up proceedings until the barracking stopped. Fingleton said that he was not perturbed by the crowd but obeyed; umpire Frank Chester and England captain Wally Hammond had no issues with this. At one point, Fingleton theatrically decided to take off his gloves, put down his bat and sit down on the pitch and refusing to resume before the gallery quietened, but this only caused a huge uproar. Wisden later criticised him, saying that he lost "all true sense of the situation...an extraordinary action on the part of a cricket in a Test match." They regarded the gesture as disrespectful as a majority of the spectators had not heckled him.

Fingleton rediscovered his form between the Tests, scoring 121 against the Gentlemen of England and 96 against Lancashire. Again however, Fingleton was unable to maintain the momentum in the Tests, making 31 and 4 against England in the Second Test at Lord's, which ended in another draw.

Fingleton then aggregated only 36 in four innings in next three county fixtures, and after the Third Test at Old Trafford never started due to persistent rain, he was concussed in the match against Warwickshire at Edgbaston. A long hop from Waite was pulled into his head at point-blank range, and Fingleton managed to duck enough that it glanced his forehead and went into the air, to the cries of "catch it" from Bradman. The ball did not go to hand and Fingleton was hospitalised.

Fingleton made 30 and 9 in a low-scoring Fourth Test at Headingley, which Australia won by five wickets to retain the Ashes. He remained unproductive in the lead-up to the final Test, scoring 51 in three first-class innings. His Test career ended disappointingly at The Oval in "Hutton's Match". In the course of England's marathon innings of 7/903 he sustained a leg injury, which prevented him from batting in either Australian innings. With Bradman also unable to bat, Australia collapsed to the heaviest defeat in Test history, by an innings and 579 runs. It capped off a tour that ended poorly after a promising start. Fingleton made 123 runs in six innings at an average of 20.50. With the outbreak of World War II, Australia was not to play another Test until the 1945–46 season, ending Fingleton's international career.

Fingleton returned to Australia and played in only three matches in the 1938–39 domestic season, scoring 81 runs at 16.20, before being sidelined at the end of December. His top-score for the season was 45 as New South Wales lost by four wickets to Victoria. In 1939–40, Fingleton had another quiet season with only 39 runs at 6.50 in three matches. He passed single figures only once in six innings and ended with a duck and three as New South Wales lost to arch-rivals Victoria by 82 runs. Fingleton retired at the end of the season.

== World War II ==
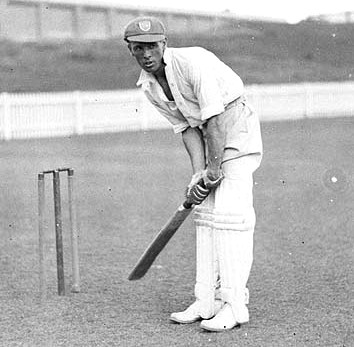
Fingleton at practice, in his NSW cap

After the start of World War II, Fingleton enlisted in the Second Australian Imperial Force in November 1941 in the artillery. He was sent to Warwick Farm, then on the western outskirts of Sydney, for training. A non-conformist known for being forthright, he did not enjoy military discipline. In May 1942, he went AWOL from his post at Double Bay on the shores of Sydney Harbour to visit his wife. As a result, he was missing when a Japanese midget submarine launched an attack in the harbour. Soon after, he was deployed to Townsville in northern Queensland in anticipation of a Japanese land invasion, which never materialised. He was then transferred to the Press Relations unit. There he did work in intelligence analysis and censorship.

The military then made him the press secretary for former Prime Minister of Australia Billy Hughes. From his appointment onwards, he lived and worked in Canberra. Hughes had changed political parties several times and was infamous for his erratic style and the government wanted Fingleton to moderate him. The leader of the United Australia Party, Hughes had particularly worried Prime Minister John Curtin by frequently and publicly excoriating US General Douglas MacArthur, who was commanding the Allied forces in the Pacific. Curtin needed someone to quieten Hughes, as Macarthur had threatened to leave if the denouncements continued. Fingleton spent three months working for the temperamental Hughes and was not successful in curbing his aggressive oratory. He then worked in censorship, deciding which portions of Curtin's press briefings were reportable; he tried to take a liberal line on press freedom. He also worked for the Australian Broadcasting Corporation's Radio Australia while serving in the censorship department.

== Post-war writing and journalism career ==
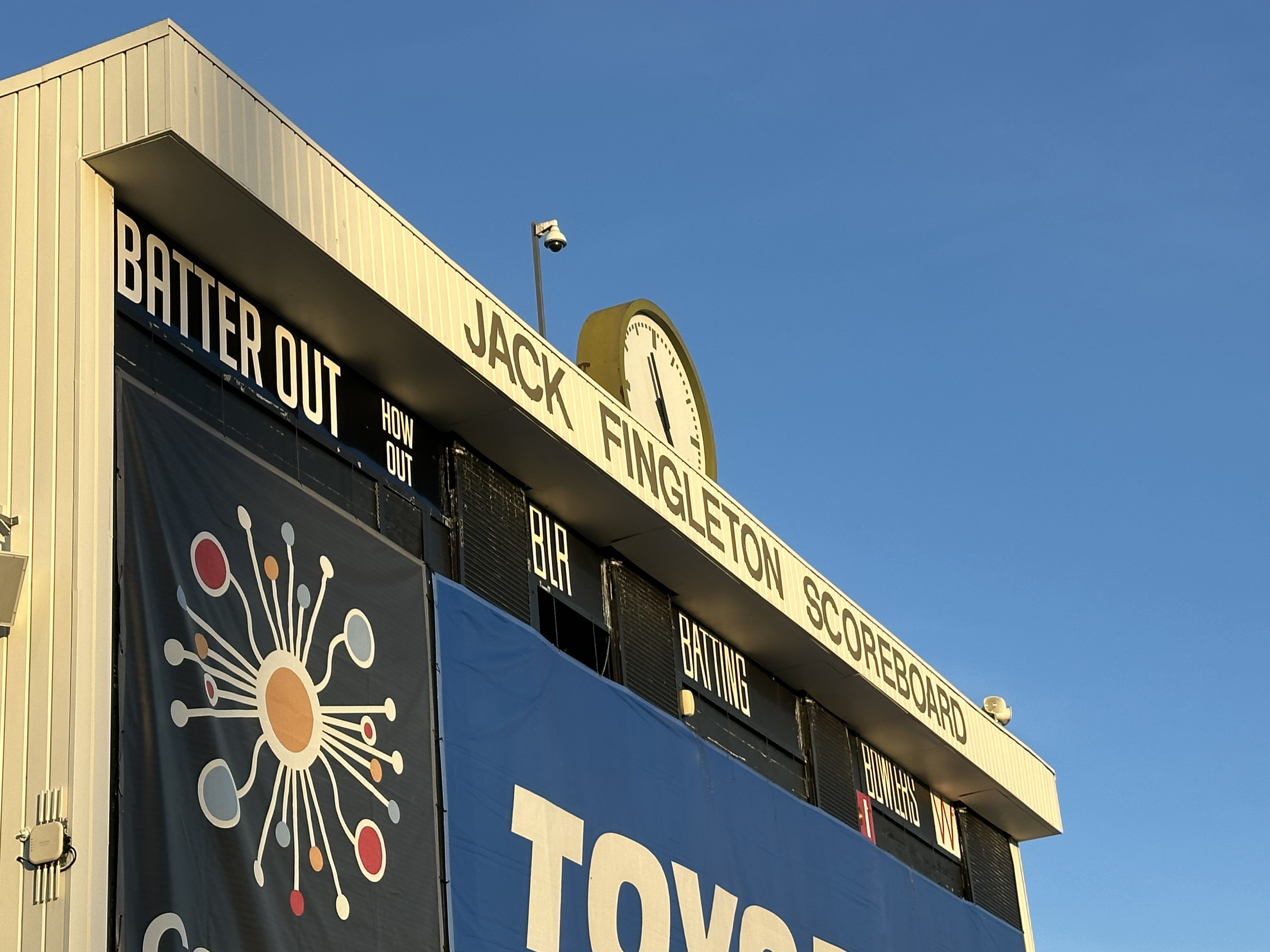
The Jack Fingleton Scoreboard at Manuka Oval in Canberra

After the end of the war, Fingleton divided his time between Canberra, where until his retirement in 1978 he was political correspondent for Radio Australia, and cricket journalism. He forged close relationships with several Prime Ministers. In particular, Sir Robert Menzies, Australia's longest-serving prime minister, provided him with a laudatory foreword in his book, Masters of Cricket. Fingleton's Test coverage resulted in a number of books that placed him at the forefront of Australian cricket writers. The books included Cricket Crisis (mainly an account of the 1932–33 Bodyline series), Brightly Fades the Don (the 1948 Invincibles tour), Brown & Company: The Tour in Australia (the English tour of Australia in 1950–51), The Ashes Crown the Year (the Australian tour of England in 1953), Masters of Cricket, Four Chukkas to Australia (the English tour of Australia in 1958–59), The Greatest Test of All (the Tied Test of 1960), Fingleton on Cricket and The Immortal Victor Trumper. His final book, the autobiographical Batting From Memory, was to have its Australian launch during the week in which he died of a heart attack. His cricket writing, regarded as one of the most stylish by an Australian, often left a sour taste with observers because of the persistent anti-Bradman jibes.

During his war years, Fingleton decided to take up book writing, in addition to newspaper journalism, and began compiling a book about the Bodyline series during his spare time in the army, a topic that was still deep in the Australian consciousness, using his inside knowledge as a participant in that Ashes campaign. As Fingleton had worked for the government's censors, he was one of only a few who knew of the effect of the Bodyline controversy in politics, as he had been aware of the cables that had been sent by government officials. Fingleton received advice and encouragement from the eminent British cricket writer Neville Cardus, and suffered a setback when, after finishing half the book, he sent his manuscript to be reviewed. It was lost in the post, and he had forgotten to make a copy. Fingleton finished his book Cricket Crisis in 1946 but it was rejected by the publishers Collins, who had already published a book by Ray Robinson named Between Wickets on the same topic. They were also concerned about the marketability of a book that criticised Bradman—still the dominant player of the time and an idolised figure—strongly. Fingleton then published with Cassell, and the book was widely acclaimed and is still regarded as the best first-hand account of the Bodyline controversy and of the classic cricket books at large. It was well known for its stylish writing and analytical value. Fingleton expressed his views forthrightly and interspersed the account with analyses and profiles of those involved in the Bodyline series, including Bradman, Jardine, Larwood, Warner and McCabe. He criticised Bradman's unorthodox approach in backing away from the bowling and questioned his aloof attitude towards his teammates. This angered Bradman, who wrote in his 1949 book Farewell to Cricket in reply to Fingleton, claiming that as Fingleton was an inferior batsman, his record gave him "scarcely...any authority to criticise my methods." The debate continued on, with replies in subsequent publications citing statistics.

As parliament is usually in recess during the summer months, Fingleton's political journalism did not often interfere with his cricket radio commentary for the ABC or his cricket writing, except during tours of England in the Australian winter. Fingleton mainly freelanced for overseas newspapers as he regarded Australian editors as being difficult to work with, and because the pay was lower. In 1946–47, England toured Australia for the first full Test series since the war. Fingleton criticised Bradman for not walking after hitting a disputed catch to Jack Ikin. Fingleton and most in the press box thought that the catch was clean but the umpire ruled in favour of Bradman. At the time Bradman had been making a comeback from ill health and had been struggling, and it was thought that he would retire if he could not discover his old form. After the disputed catch however, Bradman began timing the ball and went on to score 187. Fingleton openly criticised the decision to give Bradman not out in his writing. Later in the series, he decried Bradman's tactics of having his pacemen bowl frequent bouncers at the English batsmen, pointing out that it was hypocritical for the Australian captain to vociferously condemn Jardine's tactics years earlier. As Fingleton was one of the few who were forthright enough to question the actions of national hero Bradman, many sources within the Australian cricket community chose to confide in him, most notably all-rounder Keith Miller, whose cavalier attitude brought him into conflict with Bradman's ruthless approach to victory. The following season, during the Indian team's tour of Australia, Fingleton began his association with The Hindu.

After his death, a disused historic scoreboard from the MCG, dated to 1901, was taken out of storage and transported to Canberra, where it was installed on the top of hill at Manuka Oval, and renamed the Jack Fingleton Scoreboard. At the dedication ceremony, Governor-General of Australia Sir Ninian Stephen said that Fingleton was not merely a Test cricketer who became a parliamentary journalist in the national capital, but "an institution" in Canberra.

In addition to his writing, Fingleton was a witty, perceptive and occasionally sardonic commentator for the BBC and at various times a contributor to The Times, The Sunday Times, The Observer, and various newspapers in Australia, South Africa and elsewhere. In 1976, he was awarded an OBE for services "to journalism and to cricket". He was the subject of three appearances in 1979 and 1980 on Parkinson's TV interview show. Fingleton's judgements were characterised by careful first-hand evidence and was known for sensing the emergence of a possible story. E W Swanton stated that "Fingleton remains surely, as cricket writer and broadcaster, the best his country has".

== Family ==
Fingleton met his wife Philippa "Pip" Street in 1938 during the sea voyage from Australia to England for the Test series. Philippa was the daughter of Kenneth and Jessie Street. Her father later became the Chief Justice of New South Wales, while her mother was a prominent left-wing women's rights activist. Jessie had taken her daughter with her to a meeting of the League of Nations and then for a long tour of Europe. At the time, Philippa was only 18, and Fingleton 30, and Jessie became concerned when the pair fell in love, anticipating that problems would arise over religion. She hoped that the young couple would drift apart, but Fingleton gave the family tickets to the Fifth Test in London, only to injure himself during the match and not be able to bat. Upon returning to Australia, the couple wanted to marry, but the Streets forbade their daughter from marrying until Philippa was 21 years old. Fingleton wanted Philippa to adopt Catholicism, something that concerned her mother, as she had clashed with Catholic leaders in her advocacy of birth control. The wedding went ahead in January 1942 after Philippa agreed to convert and Fingleton got along easily with his mother-in-law's left-wing orientation. They had five children, Belinda, James, Grey, Laurence, and Jacquelyn.

== Conflict with Bradman ==
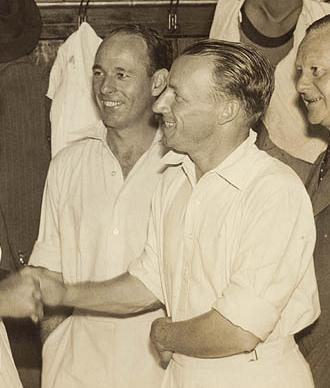
Fingleton (c) with Bradman (r)

Throughout his career as player and journalist, Fingleton persistently came into personal conflict with Don Bradman, one of the captains under whom Fingleton played, damaging the reputations of both. Bradman characteristically held his silence during Fingleton's lifetime. Bradman was known for his reserved personality, did not drink and often eschewed social activities with teammates, preferring to privately listen to music or read. Combined with his success, he gained a reputation for cockiness. In the 1930s, Australia had been divided along sectarian lines, with those of Irish descent such as Fingleton being Catholic and Anglo-Australians such as Bradman being predominantly Protestant, leading to speculation that the tension was fuelled by religion. During the 1936–37 Ashes series in Australia, four Catholics—leading bowler Bill O'Reilly, leading batsman and vice-captain Stan McCabe, Leo O'Brien and Chuck Fleetwood-Smith—were summoned by the Board of Control to respond to allegations that they were undermining Bradman. Fingleton was not invited, speculated to be due to his journalistic background, but Bradman later alleged that he was the ringleader. After that, Bradman's relationship with O'Reilly and Fingleton never recovered. When Bradman was dismissed in his final Test innings in 1948 for a duck, Fingleton and O'Reilly were reported to have laughed hysterically in the pressbox, causing E. W. Swanton to comment, "I thought they were going to have a stroke." Bradman later wrote after both had died: "With these fellows out of the way, the loyalty of my 1948 side was a big joy and made a big contribution to the outstanding success of that tour".

== Test statistics ==
		Batting				Bowling			
Opposition	Matches	Runs	Average	High score	100 / 50	Runs	Wickets	Average	Best (Inns)
England	12	671	31.95	136	2/2	–	–	–	–
South Africa	6	518	74.00	118	3/1	–	–	–	–
Overall	18	1189	42.46	136	5/3	–	–	–	–
