= George Holden (New South Wales politician) =

Australian politician

The Honourable George Kenyon Holden
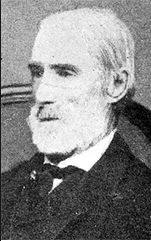

Member of Legislative Council of New South Wales
- In office 11 July 1843 – 20 June 1848

Personal details
- Born: 2 June 1808 Worcester, England
- Died: 16 April 1874 (aged 65) Darlinghurst, Sydney, New South Wales, Australia
- Party: Free Trade Party
- Relatives: John Watt (son-in-law)

George Kenyon Holden, MLC (1808 – 16 April 1874) was an Australian politician and a Crown Prosecutor. He served on the New South Wales Legislative Council. In correspondence with his associate John Stuart Mill, he was one of the first politicians in the world to propose proportional representation to parliament in 1861.

Holden was the chairman of the National Schools Board, and the president of the Sydney Mechanics' School of Arts, and a trustee of the New South Wales Savings Bank, and a director of the Liverpool and London Fire and Life Insurance Company, and a founding member of the Acclimatisation Society of New South Wales.

== Biography ==
He was born in Worcester, England. He was the son of Adam Holden and Maria (née Gillam). Holden studied law and became a solicitor, migrating to New South Wales in 1831. He was private secretary to Governor Sir Richard Bourke during his term (1831–37), and he was a stipendiary magistrate at Campbelltown. In 1837, he became Crown Prosecutor in the Quarter Sessions, and in 1838 he began private practice as a solicitor. He was a member of the New South Wales Legislative Council from 1856 to 1861 and from 1861 to 1863. Holden was inspired by John Stuart Mill to advocate a proportional representation electoral system using the Hare quota, as had been recommended by Mill in their letters. He made the proposal to parliament in 1861. An active member of parliament, Holden was secretary of the Law Commission between 1848 and 1850.

In 1849, Holden was made a member of the Board of National Education and served as such until the Board was replaced by the Council of Education in 1867. During his tenure, Holden also served as the chairman of the National Schools Board through 1865. His interest in education, as with land title reform, was likely rooted in his time as Governor Bourke's private secretary, as Bourke had been a strong advocate of public education.

In 1861, he co-founded the Acclimatisation Society of New South Wales. The Society worked to introduce, acclimatise and domesticate 'useful or ornamental' birds, fish, insects, vegetables and other exotic species. Among other species introduced to Australia by the Society are alpacas, sunflowers, watercress and pheasants. During the 1860s, the Acclimatisation Society also erected a number of cages in the Sydney Botanic Gardens in which they kept a collection of introduced birds such as pheasants, blackbirds and thrushes, which acted as part storage aviary and part exotic zoo.

His daughter Mary Jane married Australia politician John Brown Watt, and their third son was Ernest Alexander Stuart Watt, whose daughter Susan Gai Watt married Commander Sir Laurence Whistler Street. Holden died in Darlinghurst, New South Wales, Australia in 1874.
