= Edward Ogilvie =

Australian politician

The Honourable Edward David Stuart Ogilvie
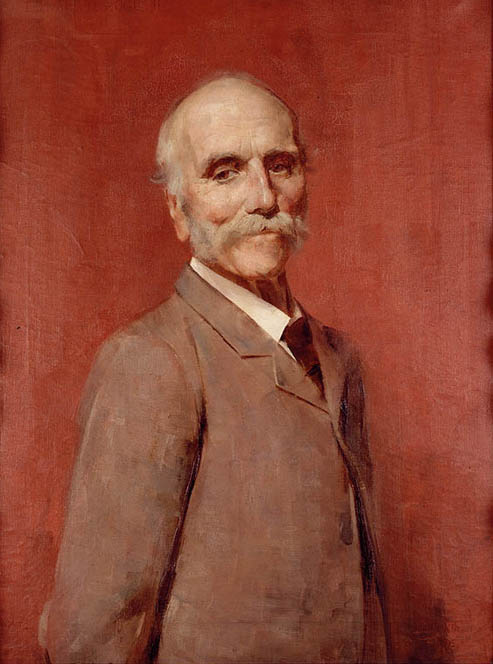
- A portrait by Tom Roberts (1894-95)

Member of Legislative Council of New South Wales

Personal details
- Born: 25 July 1814 Tottenham, London, England
- Died: 25 January 1896 (aged 81) Bowral, New South Wales, Australia
- Citizenship: Australia
- Spouse: Theodosia de Burgh
- Relatives: Jessie, Lady Street (granddaughter); Dame Bridget Ogilvie (great-great-granddaughter)

Edward David Stuart Ogilvie, MLC (25 July 1814 – 25 January 1896) was an English-born Australian politician. He served as a member of the Upper House of the New South Wales parliament. He built the renowned estate Yulgilbar.

== Biography ==
He was born in Tottenham, London, England, the son of Mary and William Ogilvie, a Royal Navy officer. He and his family migrated to Sydney in 1825, receiving free passage aboard the convict ship Grenada. His father William received a 2000 acre grant of land on the Upper Hunter which he called Merton. He was initially assigned six convict servants. William continued to expand his property through squatting, quickly reaching 6000 acres then expanding onto the Liverpool Plains.

The Ogilvies were notable for having good relations with local Indigenous people, making efforts to learn the language and customs. Edward's mother Mary was able to dispel a potentially violent stand-off between local elders and European soldiers who had wronged Indigenous people in her husband's absence. She stood between angry men holding waddies and spears, speaking to them in language and placated the situation.

Edward worked on his father's properties. In 1840, he explored up into what is now the Clarence region with his brother Frederick and an Aboriginal guide, eventually establishing the property Yulgilbar with his brother W. K. Ogilvie and C. G. Tindal, the son of his father's Royal Navy colleague.

By 1850, Yulgilbar was approximately 777 square kilometres in territory. As modelled by his parents, Ogilvie befriended local Indigenous people, employing them where they were willing and allowing them their land rights with respect to his. He began buying the territories that would be amalgamated as Yulgilbar from 1853, eventually bequeathing it to his children. In the 1860s, Ogilvie moved from sheep to cattle. Australian artist Tom Roberts described Ogilvie as "The Chief, mentally alert, a military-type in mind and physique."

Ogilvie married Theodosia de Burgh on 2 September 1858 and together they had ten children. Theodosia died in 1886. He married Alicia Georgiana Loftus Tottenham on 21 December 1890. In 1863, he was appointed to the New South Wales Legislative Council. His seat on the council was declared vacant on 27 February 1889 because he had been absent from the council for two continuous sessions. Ogilvie died at Fernside near Bowral in 1896. His granddaughter Jessie, Lady Street was Australia's first female delegate to the United Nations, and the first Vice President of the United Nations Commission on the Status of Women, and she married Lieutenant Colonel Sir Kenneth Whistler Street. His great-great-granddaughter is Dame Bridget Ogilvie, AC, FRS (born 24 March 1938), a prominent Australian scientist. His renowned estate Yulgilbar remained in his family until the 1920s when it was sold by his daughter and son-in-law. In 1949, it was acquired by Samuel Hordern and was passed to his daughter Sarah Myer on his death in 1961.
