= Jessie Street =

Australian activist

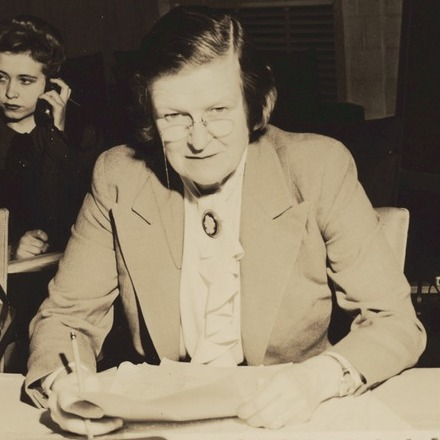
- Born: Jessie Mary Grey Lillingston; 18 April 1889; Ranchi, Bihar, Bengal Presidency, British Raj (now in Jharkhand, India)
- Died: 2 July 1970 (aged 81); Sydney, New South Wales, Australia
- Monuments: Jessie Street Gardens, Jessie Street National Women's Library
- Education: University of Sydney (BA, 1911)
- Political party: Australian Labor Party
- Spouse: Sir Kenneth Whistler Street
- Children: Sir Laurence Whistler Street
- Relatives: Edward Ogilvie (grandfather); Street family Sir Philip Whistler Street (father-in-law)

Jessie Mary Grey Street (née Lillingston; 18 April 1889 – 2 July 1970) was an Australian diplomat, suffragette, and a campaigner for Indigenous Australian rights. She was referred to as "Red Jessie" by the Australian media, due to her support for the Soviet Union through World War II and the Cold War, as she organised the "Sheepskins for Russia" campaign during World War II, and she was notably one of two Australians to attend Stalin's funeral.

As Australia's only female delegate to the founding of the United Nations in 1945, Jessie served as the first Vice President of the United Nations Commission on the Status of Women, and she played a central role in ensuring the inclusion of sex as a non-discrimination clause in the United Nations Charter. She was Lady Street from 1956, with the elevation of her husband Lieutenant Colonel Sir Kenneth Whistler Street.

== Early years ==
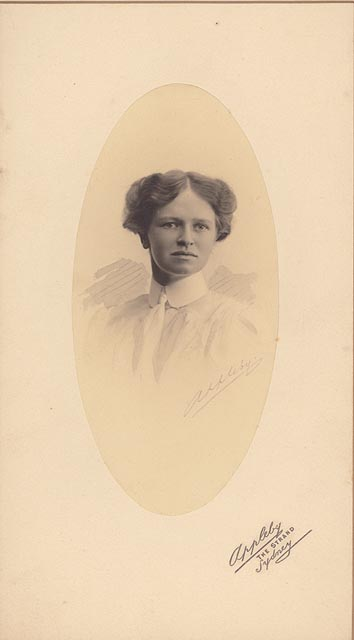
A sketch of Jessie at the age of 21

Jessie Mary Grey Lillingston was born on 18 April 1889 in Ranchi, Bihar, India, to Mabel Harriet Ogilvie and Charles Alfred Gordon Lillingston, JP. Ogilvie, born in the Northern Rivers region of New South Wales, Australia, was the daughter of Australian politician Edward David Stuart Ogilvie and Theodosia de Burgh. She died in the Northern Rivers region of New South Wales, Australia. Charles Lilingston was born in Southwold, England, and educated at the French National School of Forestry in France. He served in the Forestry Department of the Imperial Civil Service in India for 14 years, and died in the County of Ross, Scotland.

She was associated with Dorette Margarethe MacCallum and others who were challenging the patriarchy at the University of Sydney where the men were trying to monopolise the sports facilities. She graduated from the University of Sydney as a Bachelor of Arts in 1911.

In 1916, she married Kenneth Whistler Street, who was knighted in 1944. Her father-in-law Sir Philip Whistler Street served as Chief Justice of New South Wales, and as Lieutenant-Governor of New South Wales, as did her husband Kenneth and their youngest son, Laurence, who was knighted in 1976. Their other children were Belinda, Philippa and Roger.

== Career and activism ==
Street was a prominent activist in Australian and international political life for over 50 years, from the women's suffrage movement in England to the Aboriginal Australian rights. Street ran in the 1943 Australian federal election as a member of the Australian Labor Party against United Australia Party frontbencher Eric Harrison for the Sydney Eastern Suburbs seat of Wentworth, and nearly defeated him amid that year's massive Labor landslide. She led the field on the first count, and only the preferences of conservative independent Bill Wentworth allowed Harrison to survive. Her attempt was the closest a Labor candidate has ever come to winning the conservative stronghold of Wentworth.

SHEEPSKINS FOR RUSSIA. AN APPEAL TO SHEEPOWNERS.

"We write to ask for your cooperation in an appeal for sheepskins for Russia that we are making throughout New South Wales. Since the outbreak of the war in the Pacific, the Government has prohibited the export of any medical supplies, and our committee has concentrated on the purchase and dressing of sheep skins, sending them to the Russian Red Cross Society in Moscow by the Soviet ships that call at Australian ports. Russia, has millions of wounded and untold numbers of people who have lost their homes and all they possess. The cold of the Russian winter is intense, and the lives of many wounded and homeless men, women and children often depend on whether they have warm clothing and bedding..."

— Jessie Street, The Muswellbrook Chronicle

At the San Francisco Conference in 1945, Street was Australia's only female delegate to the founding of the United Nations, where she became the first Vice President of the United Nations Commission on the Status of Women, and she played a key role alongside Eleanor Roosevelt in ensuring that sex was included with race and religion as a non-discrimination clause in the United Nations Charter.

In 1941, the future prime minister Ben Chifley received a united deputation from several women's organisations, and the united deputation argued that there ought to be a tax on men who were not married, instead of the new tax on the total income of married couples, which was being proposed for introduction at the time. The delegates were Vivienne Newson, Edna Lillian Nelson, Erna Keighley and Street.

As chair of the Russian Medical Aid and Comforts Committee, she organised the "Sheepskins for Russia" campaign during World War II, announcing the appeal in a featured article, and she was notably one of two Australians to attend Stalin's funeral, along with Ernie Thornton.

In 1949, Street was made a charter member of the Australian Peace Council. In 1950, Street and fellow peace activist Louise Mackay, travelled to England to participate in the World Peace Council's Second World Peace Congress, which was held in Warsaw.

Street is the namesake of the Jessie Street Centre, the Jessie Street Trust, the Jessie Street National Women's Library and Jessie Street Gardens. She was posthumously inducted onto the Victorian Honour Roll of Women in 2001.
