= Lieutenant-Governor of New South Wales =

- Badge of the Governor of New South Wales
- Incumbent; Andrew Bell since 5 December 2022
- Office of the Governor; Executive Council of New South Wales
- Style: His Excellency The Honourable
- Member of: Supreme Court of New South Wales
- Nominator: Premier of New South Wales
- Appointer: King of Australia in right of the State of New South Wales
- Term length: At His Majesty's pleasure
- Website: Office of the Governor

The lieutenant-governor of New South Wales is a government position in the state of New South Wales, Australia, acting as a deputy to the governor of New South Wales. The office was first created in October 1786, before the arrival of the First Fleet, to act as a deputy to the first governor, Arthur Phillip. At that time the lieutenant-governor, or its equivalent of "administrator of the government", was filled by military officers and was a position only created when needed or in times of long absences by the governor. Since 1872 this office has been held concurrently by the chief justice of New South Wales but the position may be retained by the chief justice after their retirement from the Supreme Court of New South Wales.

== Role ==
Originally, the lieutenant-governor had a legislative role with a seat on the first Legislative Council of New South Wales in 1824; this was later phased out due to the lessening of the powers of the state governor. The role of the governors are enshrined in part 2A of the New South Wales Constitution Act (1902). The office itself has no standing powers but holds a dormant commission to act in the governor's position when needed.

The current role of the lieutenant-governor is to take up the duties of the governor if the governor dies, resigns, or is absent such as in September 2008, when, in the absence of Governor Marie Bashir, the Lieutenant-Governor, James Spigelman, administered the swearing in of the new cabinet of the Nathan Rees government.

If the lieutenant-governor becomes incapacitated while serving in the office of governor or is absent when the governor is also absent, the next most senior judge of the Supreme Court is sworn in as the administrator. This occurred in May 1973 when Sir Leslie Herron died suddenly while the governor, Sir Roden Cutler was overseas. Sir John Kerr became the administrator until Cutler was able to return.

== Lieutenant-governors and administrators of NSW ==
Name	Term start	Term end	Notes
Major Robert Ross	7 February 1788	8 July 1792
Major Francis Grose	11 December 1792	12 December 1794
Lieutenant-Colonel William Paterson	13 December 1794	1 September 1795
Office vacant	20 September 1795	24 March 1806
Colonel William Paterson	24 March 1806	26 January 1808
Major George Johnston	26 January 1808	25 April 1808
Lieutenant-Colonel Joseph Foveaux	25 April 1808	9 January 1809
Lieutenant-Colonel Sir Maurice O'Connell	10 January 1810	12 February 1814
Colonel George Molle	13 February 1814	12 September 1817
Colonel James Erskine	12 September 1817	25 February 1823
Colonel William Stewart	26 February 1823	23 March 1827
Office vacant	24 March 1827	4 December 1837
Colonel Patrick Lindesay	22 October 1831	2 December 1831	(Note: He is listed as a former Lieutenant-Governor, however it would appear he was appointed as Acting Governor.)
Lieutenant-Colonel Kenneth Snodgrass	5 December 1837	23 February 1838
Office vacant	24 February 1838	12 July 1846
Sir Maurice O'Connell	12 July 1846	2 August 1846
Office vacant	2 August 1846	21 January 1861
Lieutenant-Colonel John Francis Kempt	22 January 1861	21 March 1861
Office vacant	22 March 1861	21 May 1867
Major-General Sir Trevor Chute	December 1867	January 1868
Office vacant	1868	21 February 1872
Lieutenant-Governors held concurrently by the Chief Justice
Sir Alfred Stephen	22 February 1872	26 November 1891
Sir Frederick Darley	26 November 1891	30 March 1910
George Bowen Simpson	24 March 1909	27 January 1910
Sir William Cullen	30 March 1910	1 October 1930
Sir Philip Street	1 October 1930	17 October 1938
Sir Frederick Jordan	17 October 1938	4 November 1949
Sir Kenneth Street	27 February 1950	22 April 1972
Sir Leslie Herron	22 April 1972	3 May 1973
Sir John Kerr	30 August 1973	1 July 1974
Sir Laurence Street	1 July 1974	24 July 1989
Anthony Murray Gleeson	24 July 1989	18 June 1998
James Spigelman	18 June 1998	1 February 2012
Tom Bathurst	1 February 2012	5 December 2022
Andrew Bell	5 December 2022	present
