= South Eastern Sydney and Illawarra Area Health Service =

Agency overview
- Formed: January 2005
- Dissolved: 31 December 2010
- Minister responsible: Carmel Tebbutt, Minister for Health
- Parent agency: New South Wales Department of Health
- Website: www.sesiahs.health.nsw.gov.au

South Eastern Sydney and Illawarra Area Health Service (SESIAHS) was formed in 2005 from the amalgamation of the Illawarra Area Health Service and South Eastern Sydney Area Health Service. It was disbanded on 1 January 2011 as part of the National Health Reform and creation of Local Hospital Networks. It was a statutory body of the New South Wales Government, operating under the NSW Department of Health, charged with the provision of public health services in eastern and southern Sydney, and regions to the south of Sydney. The area's Area Health Advisory Council was headed by Bob Farnsworth.

== Major facilities ==
=== Eastern hospital network ===
- Prince of Wales Hospital
- Royal Hospital for Women
- Sydney Children's Hospital
- Sydney Hospital and Sydney Eye Hospital

=== Central hospital network ===
- Garrawarra Centre
- St George Hospital
- Sutherland Hospital

=== Southern hospital network ===
- Bulli Hospital
- Coledale Hospital
- David Berry Hospital
- Kiama Hospital and Community Health Service
- Milton-Ulladulla Hospital
- Port Kembla Hospital
- Shellharbour Hospital
- Shoalhaven District Memorial Hospital
- Wollongong Hospital

=== Affiliated health organisations ===
- Calvary Health Care Kogarah
- St Vincent's Hospital
- War Memorial Hospital

=== Lord howe island ===
- Gower Wilson Memorial Hospital
