= Royal Australian Naval Reserve =

- Active: 1973–Present
- Country: Australia
- Type: Navy
- Part of: Royal Australian Navy
- March: Royal Australian Navy

Commanders
- Chief of the Defence Force: General Angus Campbell AO, DSC
- Chief of Navy: Vice Admiral Mark Hammond AO, RAN
- Director-General Australian Navy Cadets and Reserves: Rear Admiral Bruce Kafer AM, CSC, RAN
- Captain (Reserves): Captain Harry Lok, RANR

The Royal Australian Naval Reserve (RANR) is the volunteer reserve force of the Royal Australian Navy in Australia.

The current Royal Australian Naval Reserve was formed in June 1973 by merging the former RANR (Seagoing) and the Royal Australian Naval Volunteer Reserve.
