= John Henry Challis =

Australian businessman

John Henry Challis (6 August 1806 – 28 February 1880) was an Anglo-Australian merchant, landowner and philanthropist, whose bequest to the University of Sydney allowed for the establishment of the Challis Professorships.

== Early life and migration ==
Challis was born in England, the son of John Henry Challis, sergeant in the 9th Regiment, and his first wife. He was educated at several schools and trained as a clerk. He then migrated to Sydney, New South Wales, arriving on the Pyramis on 9 May 1829 as a steerage passenger. The business dealt in wool, whale oil other commodities and became very prosperous. Challis was a full or part owner of nine vessels that made 26 whaling voyages between 1840 and 1852. He acquired several properties, including a large holding at Potts Point, pastoral licenses of over 12,000 sq. miles (31,080 km²) in southern New South Wales, more than 3,500 cattle and 11,000 sheep. In 1855 he sold his business interests and returned to England.

== Sydney University bequest ==
In 1856 Challis subscribed for stained glass windows in the Great Hall of the University of Sydney; in 1859 he re-visited Sydney and gave £700 for the 'Royal Window'.

Henrietta died on 19 September 1884 and because Challis had been residing in England, the English Inland Revenue Commission claimed legacy duties. The University of Sydney's chancellor, Sir William Montagu Manning, strenuously argued against the Commission's claims which were subsequently abandoned.

The University also developed a property in Martin Place, subsequently named Challis House. Completed in 1907 and remodelled in the Art Deco style in 1936 and again refurbished in 1973, the commercial premises provides income to sustain Challis' legacy.
