= Samuels =

Samuels is a surname. Notable people with the surname include:

- Andrew Samuels (born 1949), British psychologist
- Arthur Samuels (1852–1925), Irish politician
- Cameron Samuels, American activist
- Chris Samuels (born 1977), American football player
- Dale Samuels (born 1931), American football player
- Dave Samuels (1948–2019), American musician
- David Samuels (political scientist), American political science professor
- David Samuels (EastEnders), fictional character in BBC TV soap opera EastEnders
- David Samuels (writer) (born 1967), American author
- Dover Samuels (born 1939), New Zealand politician
- Ernest Samuels (1903–1996), American biographer
- Giovonnie Samuels (born 1985), American actress
- Gordon Samuels (1923–2007), Australian lawyer and judge, Governor of New South Wales
- Howard C. Samuels (born 1952), American clinical psychologist
- Howard J. Samuels (1919–1984), American statesman, industrialist, civil rights activist and philanthropist
- Jamar Samuels (born 1989), American professional basketball player
- Jaylen Samuels (born 1996), American football player
- Joel Samuels, fictional character in Australian soap opera Neighbours
- John Samuels (born 1961), American actor
- Joseph Samuels, American musician and band leader
- Josh Samuels (born 1991), American water polo player
- Kalman Samuels (born 1951), founder of the organization Shalva
- Lawrence Samuels (born 1970), American arena football player
- Lesser Samuels, (1894–1980), American screenwriter
- Lynn Samuels (1942–2011), American radio host
- Marlon Samuels (born 1981), Jamaican cricketer
- Martin A. Samuels is an American physician
- Maxwell Samuels (1940–2014), Belizean politician
- Milton Samuels (1904–1990), American musician
- Moss Turner-Samuels (1888–1957), British politician
- Robert Samuels (cricketer) (born 1971), Jamaican cricketer
- Ron Samuels, American film producer
- Samardo Samuels (born 1989), Jamaican basketball player
- Skyler Samuels (born 1994), American actress
- Stanford Samuels III (born 1999), American football player
- Stephen Mitchell Samuels (1938–2012), American statistician and mathematician
- Theo Samuels (1873–1896), South African rugby union player
- Tony Samuels (1954–2001), American football player
- Warren Samuels (1933–2011), American economist and historian of economic thought

== Name disambiguation pages ==
- David Samuels
- Howard Samuels
- James Samuels
- John Samuels
- Michael Samuels
- Richard Samuels
- Robert Samuels
- Stanford Samuels
- William Samuels

== See also ==
- Samuel (disambiguation)
- Samuelson
