= Official Secretary to the Governor of New South Wales =

The Official Secretary to the Governor of New South Wales and his staff, as part of the Office of the Governor, provide governors with the necessary support to enable them to carry out their constitutional, statutory, ceremonial and public duties. The position of Official Secretary was established on 1 December 1905, replacing the previous position of the Clerk to the Private Secretary to the Governor. From time to time the Governor has also appointed a private secretary, operating alongside the Official Secretary. The Official Secretary, as the head of the Office of the Governor, is an executive-level officer of the Department of Premier and Cabinet, and is the Chief of Staff of Government House. This office is funded through the annual budget, as is the governor's salary.

The support provided by the Office of the Governor includes the organisation of, and advice relating to, their duties, hospitality for official functions, and administration of the Australian honours and Awards system. The Official Secretary is ex-officio Secretary of the Executive Council of New South Wales and NSW's nominee to serve on the Council for the Order of Australia. The Official Secretary is supported in his role by a Deputy Official Secretary and program managers responsible for the Government House Estate, Household and Protocol.

The current Official Secretary is Colonel Michael Miller RFD, who succeeded Brian Davies in March 2015. Miller had previously served Governors Gordon Samuels and Marie Bashir as an Honorary Aide-de-Camp (ADC) from May 1996 to June 2001 and was awarded the Centenary Medal for his service to the Governor. The Deputy Official Secretary is Christopher Sullivan since 4 November 2013.

== Office-holders ==
=== Clerk to the Private Secretary ===
Clerk	Period	Governors served	Notes
John Joseph Massey Cashman	10 October 1859 – 24 November 1866	Denison, Young, Belmore	
George William Newcombe	11 December 1866 – 30 June 1871	Belmore	
William Byrnes	1 July 1871 – 4 November 1893	Belmore, Robinson, Loftus, Carrington, Jersey, Duff	
William Abbott de Mouncey	4 November 1893 – 3 September 1895	Duff	
Henry Herbert Lewis	3 September 1895 – 21 August 1902	Hampden, Beauchamp, Rawson	
Harry Budge	21 August 1902 – 1 December 1905	Rawson	

=== Official Secretaries ===
Official Secretary	Period	Governors served	Notes
Sir Harry Budge CMG	1 December 1905 – June 1936	Rawson, Chelmsford, Strickland, Davidson, de Chair, Game, Gowrie	
Leonard Arthur Robb LVO, CMG	June 1936 – 1957	Anderson, Wakehurst, Northcott	
Major John Frederick Martin MVO, MBE, ED	1957–1958	Woodward	
Lindsay Rose CVO, OBE	1958–1975	Woodward, Cutler	
Richard Wills ISO, LVO	1975–1986	Cutler, Rowland	
Alan Edward McKenzie	1986–1996	Rowland, Martin, Sinclair	
Brian Davies CVO	1996–2009	Samuels, Bashir	
Noel Campbell	2009–2012	Bashir	
Brian Davies CVO	2012 – 16 March 2015	Bashir, Hurley	
Colonel Michael Miller LVO RFD	16 March 2015 – present	Hurley, Beazley	

=== Private Secretaries ===
Official Secretary	Period	Governors served	Notes
Hon. Victor Nelson Hood	14 March 1913 – 14 May 1913	Strickland	
Brigadier-General Harry Finn CB DCM	14 May 1913 – 1 April 1918	Strickland, Cullen, Davidson	
Captain Reginald George Stanham	1 April 1918 – 25 July 1919	Davidson	
Frank de Villiers Lamb CBE	25 July 1919 – 5 April 1921	Davidson	
Major Jocelyn Egerton	5 April 1921 – 1 July 1922	Davidson	
Muriel Henderson	1 July 1922 – 5 October 1923	Davidson	
Brigadier-General Harry Finn CB DCM	5 October 1923 – 18 February 1924	Cullen	
Commander Duncan Walter Grant CBE	18 February 1924 – 9 September 1925	de Chair	
Marchant Eric Harvey Penfold	9 September 1925 – May 1927	de Chair	
Brigadier-General Austin Thomas Anderson CMG	May 1927 – June 1936	de Chair, Game, Gowrie	
Captain Hugh Beaumont Robinson DSO	June 1936 – April 1937	Anderson	
Captain Kenneth O'Brien Harding	April 1937 – June 1940	Wakehurst	
Peter Lubbock	June 1940 – January 1946	Wakehurst	
Major Kenneth Bieri	August 1946 – November 1947	Northcott	

== See also ==
- Official Secretary to the Governor-General of New Zealand
- Official Secretary to the Governor-General of Australia
