= Samuelsen =

Origin
- Meaning: "son of Samuel"

Other names
- Variant forms: Samuelson, Samuelsson

Samuelsen is a Scandinavian patronymic surname meaning "son of Samuel". There are alternative spellings such as the English language Samuelson and the Swedish Samuelsson. It is uncommon as a given name. Samuelsen may refer to:

- Aage Samuelsen (1919–1987), Norwegian evangelist, singer and composer
- Alf Ivar Samuelsen (1942–2014), Norwegian politician
- Anders Samuelsen (born 1967), Danish politician
- Andras Samuelsen (1873–1954), Faroese politician and Prime Minister
- Frank Samuelsen (1870–1946), Norwegian-American who, with George Harbo, became the first to row across an ocean
- Jone Samuelsen (born 1984), Norwegian footballer
- Símun Samuelsen (born 1985), Faroese footballer

== See also ==
- Samuels
- Samuelson
- Samuelsson
