= Samuelsson =

Origin
- Meaning: "son of Samuel"

Other names
- Variant forms: Samuelson, Samuelsen

Samuelsson is a Swedish patronymic surname meaning "son of Samuel". There are alternative spellings such as the English Samuelson and the Norwegian Samuelsen. It is uncommon as a given name. Samuelsson may refer to:

- Bengt I. Samuelsson (1934–2024), Swedish biochemist
- Evelina Samuelsson (born 1984), Swedish ice hockey player
- Guðjón Samúelsson (1887–1950), Icelandic architect
- Gunnar Samuelsson (1927–2007), Swedish cross-country skier
- Håkan Samuelsson (born 1951), Swedish businessman
- Henrik Samuelsson (born 1994), Swedish-American ice hockey player
- Kalle Samuelsson (born 1986), Swedish bandy player
- Kjell Samuelsson (born 1958), Swedish ice hockey player
- Magnus Samuelsson (born 1969), Swedish actor, "World's Strongest Man"
- Magnus Samuelsson (footballer, born 1971), Swedish footballer
- Magnus Samuelsson (footballer, born 1972), Swedish footballer
- Marcus Samuelsson (born 1970), Swedish chef and restaurant owner
- Martin Samuelsson (born 1982), Swedish ice hockey player
- Mattias Samuelsson (born 2000), American ice hockey player
- Mikael Samuelsson (born 1976), Swedish ice hockey player
- Philip Samuelsson (born 1991), Swedish-American ice hockey player
- Sebastian Samuelsson (born 1997), Swedish biathlete
- Tommy Samuelsson (born 1960), Swedish ice hockey player
- Ulf Samuelsson (born 1964), Swedish ice hockey player

== See also ==
- Samuels
- Samuelsen
- Samuelson
