= Samelson =

Samelson is a surname. Notable people with this surname include:

- Adolph Samelson (1817–1888), German Jewish ophthalmic surgeon
- Franz Samelson (1923–2015), German-American psychologist
- Hans Samelson (1916–2005), German-American mathematician
- Klaus Samelson (1918–1980), German mathematician and physicist

== See also ==
- Samuelson
