= Samuelson =

Origin
- Meaning: "son of Samuel"

Other names
- Variant forms: Samuelsson, Samuelsen

Samuelson is an English-language patronymic surname meaning "son of Samuel". There are alternative spellings such as the Scandinavian-origin Samuelsson and Samuelsen. It is uncommon as a given name. Samuelson may refer to:

- Sir Bernhard Samuelson (1820–1905), British industrialist and educationalist
- Bob Samuelson (born 1966), American Olympic volleyball player
- Cecil O. Samuelson (born 1941), American physician, president of Brigham Young University
- Don Samuelson (1913–2000), American politician from Idaho
- Emily Samuelson (born 1990), American ice dancer
- G. B. Samuelson (1888–1947), British filmmaker
- Godfrey Samuelson (1863–1941), British politician, member of parliament 1887–92
- Gar Samuelson (1958–1999), American drummer for the band Megadeth
- Sir Henry Samuelson (1845–1937), English politician
- Karlie Samuelson (born 1995), American basketball player
- Katie Lou Samuelson (born 1997), American basketball player
- Linda C. Samuelson (born 1954), American physiologist
- Marc Samuelson, British television and film producer
- Marcus Samuelsson (born 1970), Ethiopia-born Swedish restaurateur
- Martha Samuelson, American business consultant
- Mikael Samuelson (born 1951), Swedish stage actor
- Orion Samuelson (1934–2026), American agriculture broadcaster
- Pamela Samuelson, American professor of law at the University of California, Berkeley
- Paul Samuelson (1915–2009), American economist
- Peter Samuelson (born 1951), American filmmaker and philanthropist
- Ralph Samuelson (1903–1977), American inventor of water skiing
- Robert J. Samuelson (1945–2025), American journalist and columnist
- Ruth Samuelson (1959–2017), American politician
- Scott Samuelson, American philosopher
- Sivert Samuelson (1883–1958), South African cricketer
- Svend Samuelson (1825–1891), American farmer and politician
- Sir Sydney Samuelson (1925–2022), British film producer
- Victor Samuelson (born 1937), American businessman

== Fictional characters ==
- Dr Torsten Samuelson, fictional character in Paid Programming, 2009 pilot for American TV programming block Adult Swim

== See also ==
- Samuels
- Samuelsen
- Samuelsson
- Samuelson Baronets
- Samelson
