= Samuel Karlin =

Polish American mathematician

- Born: June 8, 1924; Janów, Lublin Province, Second Polish Republic
- Died: December 18, 2007 (aged 83); Palo Alto, California, US
- Citizenship: American
- Education: Illinois Institute of Technology; Princeton University
- Known for: BLAST; Karlin-Rubin theorem (UMP tests of monotone likelihoods) geometry of moments Total positivity Tchebycheff systems Optimal experiments
- Awards: National Medal of Science (1989); John von Neumann Theory Prize (1987)
- Scientific career
- Fields: mathematical sciences population genetics
- Workplaces: Stanford University
- Doctoral advisor: Salomon Bochner
- Doctoral students: Christopher Burge; Thomas Liggett; Charles A. Micchelli; John W. Pratt; Stephen M. Samuels; Charles Joel Stone; Rupert G. Miller; Marcel F. Neuts

Samuel Karlin (June 8, 1924 – December 18, 2007) was an American mathematician at Stanford University in the late 20th century.

== Education and career ==
Karlin was born in Janów, Poland and immigrated to Chicago as a child. Raised in an Orthodox Jewish household, Karlin became an atheist in his teenage years and remained an atheist for the rest of his life. Later in life he told his three children, who all became scientists, that walking down the street without a yarmulke on his head for the first time was a milestone in his life.

Karlin earned his undergraduate degree from Illinois Institute of Technology; and then his doctorate in mathematics from Princeton University in 1947 (at the age of 22) under the supervision of Salomon Bochner. He was on the faculty of Caltech from 1948 to 1956, before becoming a professor of mathematics and statistics at Stanford.

Throughout his career, Karlin made fundamental contributions to the fields of mathematical economics, bioinformatics, game theory, evolutionary theory, biomolecular sequence analysis, and total positivity. Karlin authored ten books and more than 450 articles. He did extensive work in mathematical population genetics. In the early 1990s, Karlin and Stephen Altschul developed the Karlin-Altschul statistics, a basis for the highly used sequence similarity software program BLAST.

== Honors and awards ==
Karlin was a member of the American Academy of Arts and Sciences, the National Academy of Sciences, and the American Philosophical Society. He won a Lester R. Ford Award in 1973. In 1989, President George H. W. Bush bestowed Karlin the National Medal of Science "for his broad and remarkable research in mathematical analysis, probability theory and mathematical statistics, and in the application of these ideas to mathematical economics, mechanics, and population genetics." He was elected to the 2002 class of Fellows of the Institute for Operations Research and the Management Sciences.

== Personal life ==
One of Karlin's sons, Kenneth D. Karlin, is a professor of chemistry at Johns Hopkins University and the 2009 winner of the American Chemical Society's F. Albert Cotton Award for Synthetic Chemistry. His other son, Manuel, is a physician in Portland, Oregon. His daughter, Anna R. Karlin, is a theoretical computer scientist, the Microsoft Professor of Computer Science & Engineering at the University of Washington.

== Selected publications ==
- Karlin, Samuel; Arrow, Kenneth J.; Suppes, Patrick (1960). Mathematical models in the social sciences, 1959: Proceedings of the first Stanford symposium. Stanford, California: Stanford University Press. ISBN 978-0-8047-0021-4.
- Karlin, Samuel; Fabens, Augustus J. (1960), "A stationary inventory model with Markovian demand", in Arrow, Kenneth J.; Karlin, Samuel; Suppes, Patrick (eds.), Mathematical models in the social sciences, 1959: Proceedings of the first Stanford symposium, Stanford mathematical studies in the social sciences, IV, Stanford, California: Stanford University Press, pp. 159–175, ISBN 978-0-8047-0021-4.
- S. Karlin and H. M. Taylor. A First Course in Stochastic Processes. Academic Press, 1975 (second edition).
- S. Karlin and H. M. Taylor. A Second Course in Stochastic Processes. Academic Press, 1981.
- S. Karlin and H. M. Taylor. An Introduction to Stochastic Modeling, Third Edition. Academic Press, 1998. ISBN 0-12-684887-4
- S. Karlin, D. Eisenberg, and R. Altman. Bioinformatics: Unsolved Problems and Challenges. National Academic Press Inc., 2005. ISBN 978-0-309-10029-8.
- S. Karlin (Ed.). Econometrics, Time Series, and Multivariate Statistics. Academic Press, 1983. ISBN 978-0-12-398750-1.
- S. Karlin (Author) and E. Nevo (Editor). Evolutionary Processes and Theory. Academic Press, 1986. ISBN 978-0-12-398760-0.
- S. Karlin. Mathematical Methods and Theory in Games, Programming, and Economics. Dover Publications, 1992. ISBN 978-0-486-67020-1.
- S. Karlin and E. Nevo (Eds.). Population Genetics and Ecology. Academic Press, 1976. ISBN 978-0-12-398560-6.
- S. Karlin and W. J. Studden. Tchebycheff systems: With applications in analysis and statistics (pure and applied mathematics). Interscience Publishers, 1966 (1st edition). ASIN B0006BNV2C.
- S Karlin and S. Lessard. Theoretical Studies on Sex Ratio Evolution. Princeton University Press, 1986. ISBN 978-0-691-08412-1
- S. Karlin. Theory of Infinite Games. Addison Wesley Longman Ltd. Inc., 1959. ASIN B000SNID12.
- S. Karlin. Total Positivity, Vol. 1. Stanford, 1968. ASIN B000LZG0Xu.
- Karlin Samuel, Altschul Stephen F. (1990). "Methods for assessing the statistical significance of molecular sequence features by using general scoring schemes". Proc Natl Acad Sci USA. 87 (6): 2264–8. Bibcode:1990PNAS...87.2264K. doi:10.1073/pnas.87.6.2264. PMC 53667. PMID 2315319.
- Karlin S, Altschul SF. (1993). "Applications and statistics for multiple high-scoring segments in molecular sequences". Proc Natl Acad Sci USA. 90 (12): 5873–7. Bibcode:1993PNAS...90.5873K. doi:10.1073/pnas.90.12.5873. PMC 46825. PMID 8390686.

== See also ==
- Karlin–McGregor polynomials
