= Samuel (disambiguation) =

Samuel may refer to:

- Samuel, a Biblical figure

== People with the name Samuel ==
- Samuel (name)
  - Samuel (cartoonist) (1925–2012), Kerala cartoonist
  - Samuel (singer) (born 2002), full name Samuel Kim Arredondo, South Korean singer
  - Samuel (musician) (born 1987), American indie musician
  - Samuel (footballer, born 1974), full name Samuel José da Silva Vieira, Brazilian football centre-back
  - Samuel (footballer, born 1986), full name Samuel Firmino de Jesus, Brazilian football centre-back
  - Samuel (footballer, born 1988), full name Samuel Elias do Carmo Soares, Brazilian football defender
  - Samuel (footballer, born 1991), full name Samuel Rosa Gonçalves, Brazilian football striker
  - Samuel (footballer, born 1999), full name Samuel Gomes da Mata, Brazilian football forward

== Other uses ==
- Samuel (animated series)
- Samuel Beers House, historic residence in Knox County, Ohio, US.
- Samuel (novel), an 1886 Armenian novel by Raffi.
- Samuel (2026 TV series), Indonesian TV series which aired on WeTV.
