= Howard Samuels =

Howard Samuels may refer to:

- Howard C. Samuels (born 1952), American clinical psychologist
- Howard J. Samuels (1919–1984), American statesman, industrialist, civil rights activist and philanthropist
- Howard Samuels (actor), in The Nativity
