= Edward Hutton (British Army officer) =

British Army general

Lieutenant-General Sir Edward Hutton KCB KCMG DL FRGS
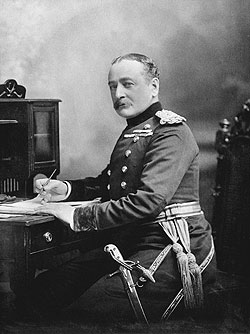
- Major-General Edward Hutton, c.1900
- Born: 6 December 1848; Torquay, Devon
- Died: 4 August 1923 (aged 74); Lyne, Surrey
- Military career
- Allegiance: United Kingdom
- Branch: British Army
- Service years: 1867–1907; 1914–1915
- Rank: Lieutenant-General
- Commands: 21st Division (1914–1915); 3rd Division (1905–1906); General Officer Commanding the Australian Military Forces (1901–1904); General Officer Commanding the Militia of Canada (1898–1900)
- Conflicts: Anglo-Zulu War; First Boer War; Anglo-Egyptian War; Nile Expedition; Second Boer War: Battle of Witpoort; First World War
- Awards: Knight Commander of the Order of the Bath; Knight Commander of the Order of St Michael and St George; Mentioned in Despatches (12)

Lieutenant-General Sir Edward Thomas Henry Hutton, KCB, KCMG, DL, FRGS (6 December 1848 – 4 August 1923) was a British military commander, who pioneered the use of mounted infantry in the British Army and later commanded the Canadian Militia and the Australian Army.

== Early career ==
Hutton was born in Torquay, Devon, in December 1848, the only son of Colonel Sir Edward Thomas Hutton, of Beverly, and stepson of General Sir Arthur Lawrence. The swordsman Alfred Hutton (1839–1910) was his uncle. He was educated at Eton College, leaving in 1867 and taking a commission in the King's Royal Rifle Corps. Promotion to lieutenant came in 1871, and from 1873 to 1877 he served as Adjutant of the 4th Battalion.

He first saw active duty in Africa in 1879, when he served with his regiment in the Anglo-Zulu War, being mentioned in despatches and promoted to captain for his service at the Battle of Gingindlovu. He served with the mounted infantry force in the First Anglo-Boer War of 1880–81, and as a result was appointed to command the mounted infantry in the Anglo-Egyptian War of 1882 as a brevet major. He fought around Alexandria and at the Battle of Tel el-Kebir, where he had a horse killed underneath him and was again mentioned in despatches. In the Nile Expedition of 1884–85, he was appointed to the staff, again in command of the mounted infantry.

Hutton had become closely linked with the employment of mounted infantry in the African campaigns, and was the army's leading authority on its use; in 1886, he gave a public lecture calling for a widespread scheme of training and preparing mounted infantry units within the units stationed in Britain. He was supported by Sir Garnet Wolseley, a prominent Army moderniser, and Hutton was given command of the newly raised composite regiment of mounted infantry at Aldershot in 1887, promoted lieutenant colonel in 1889 and colonel in 1892. Wolseley's support of Hutton has led him to be named as a member of the influential "Wolseley ring" by some biographers, but he was five to ten years younger than most members, and other sources often do not list him as a member of the group.

His influence was strengthened by his marriage, in 1889, to Eleanor Mary Paulet, daughter of Rev. Lord Charles Paulet, and niece of the Marquess of Winchester and of Field-Marshal Lord William Paulet. His improved social connections led to him being appointed as an aide-de-camp to Queen Victoria in 1892.

== Overseas command ==
=== New South Wales ===
In 1893, Hutton was named commandant of the military forces in New South Wales and promoted to the temporary rank of major general. He was recalled in 1896 for a year's service in Ireland as chief staff officer in the Dublin district and at the Curragh.

=== Canada and South Africa ===
In 1898, he was again temporary promoted to the rank of major general and made General Officer Commanding the Militia of Canada.

When the Second Boer War with South Africa was on the horizon, Hutton lobbied Canada to participate. Without informing Canada's Prime Minister, Sir Wilfrid Laurier, Hutton published mobilization plans in the Canadian Military Gazette. Laurier's government then received a letter of gratitude from Britain for its decision to aid them in the Boer region. Furious, Laurier announced Canada's refusal to send any contingents. In the end, political pressure was too great, and Canada played a role in the war. However, the row led to Hutton being recalled in early 1900. Replying to a question in the Dominion House of Commons, Laurier said that the causes of the difference were that Hutton was "insubordinate and indiscreet and deliberately ignored the authority of the Minister of Militia in the administration of his department".

In early March 1900 Hutton left Southampton in the SS Tantallon Castle, which arrived in South Africa later the same month. He took up the post as Commander of the 1st Mounted Infantry Brigade, a formation made up of Canadian, Australian, and New Zealand troops. This force was actively engaged both during Lord Roberts's advance from Bloemfontein and after the fall of Pretoria. When the brigade was broken up in November 1900, he returned to the United Kingdom, where he was knighted as a Knight Commander of the Order of St Michael and St George (KCMG) for his services in the South African campaign.

Hutton was in November 1901 appointed Honorary Colonel of the 7th (Militia) Battalion, King's Royal Rifle Corps.

=== Australia ===
In late November 1901 it was announced that Hutton would become the first General Officer Commanding the Australian Military Forces. He was recommended by Field Marshal Lord Roberts after several other officers had refused or were rejected by the government. He arrived in Australia in January 1902, and his main task became that of transforming six colonial forces into one national Australian Army.

In 1904, Hutton promoted what was then a novel idea that Empire military attachés should be sent to witness the clash of Russian and Japanese forces in Manchuria. Australian sources reveal a nested array of factors affecting the mission of Colonel John Hoad, who was detached by the Deakin government to serve with the Imperial Japanese Army in 1904–1905. Along with other Western military attachés, Hoad had two complementary missions–to assist the Japanese and to observe the Japanese forces in the field during the Russo-Japanese War.

Hutton resigned as GOC Australian Military Force at the end of 1904.

== Later career ==
After his resignation, Hutton was appointed commander of 3rd Division in 1905, holding the command until 1906, and given a post overseeing administration in Eastern Command. In November 1907 he was promoted lieutenant general, shortly before his retirement. In June 1908 he became colonel commandant of the KRRC, taking over from General Sir Redvers Buller.

In 1914, he was recalled from retirement to command the newly raised 21st Division in the New Armies – the Australian government having turned down a suggestion he should be offered command of the Australian Imperial Force – but fell ill early in 1915, after a riding accident, and was relieved of command in April.

In retirement, he wrote a history of the King's Royal Rifle Corps, and a number of pamphlets on military affairs.

He was a Fellow of the Royal Geographical Society.

Hutton died in 1923; he was survived by his wife.

Hutton had 1 illegitimate child whilst stationed in Cairo.

== Works ==
- "The Bond of Military Unity" . The Empire and the century. London: John Murray. 1905. pp. 227–248.

== Notes ==
Military offices
Preceded by Sir William Gascoigne	General Officer Commanding the Militia of Canada; 1898–1900	Succeeded by Sir Richard O'Grady Haly
New command	GOC Australian Military Forces; 1901–1904	Succeeded by Harry Finn
Preceded by Sir Bruce Hamilton	GOC 3rd Division; 1905–1906	Succeeded by William Franklyn
New command	GOC 21st Division; 1914–1915	Succeeded by George Forestier-Walker
