= Governor of New South Wales =

Vice-regal representative

- Standard of the Governor

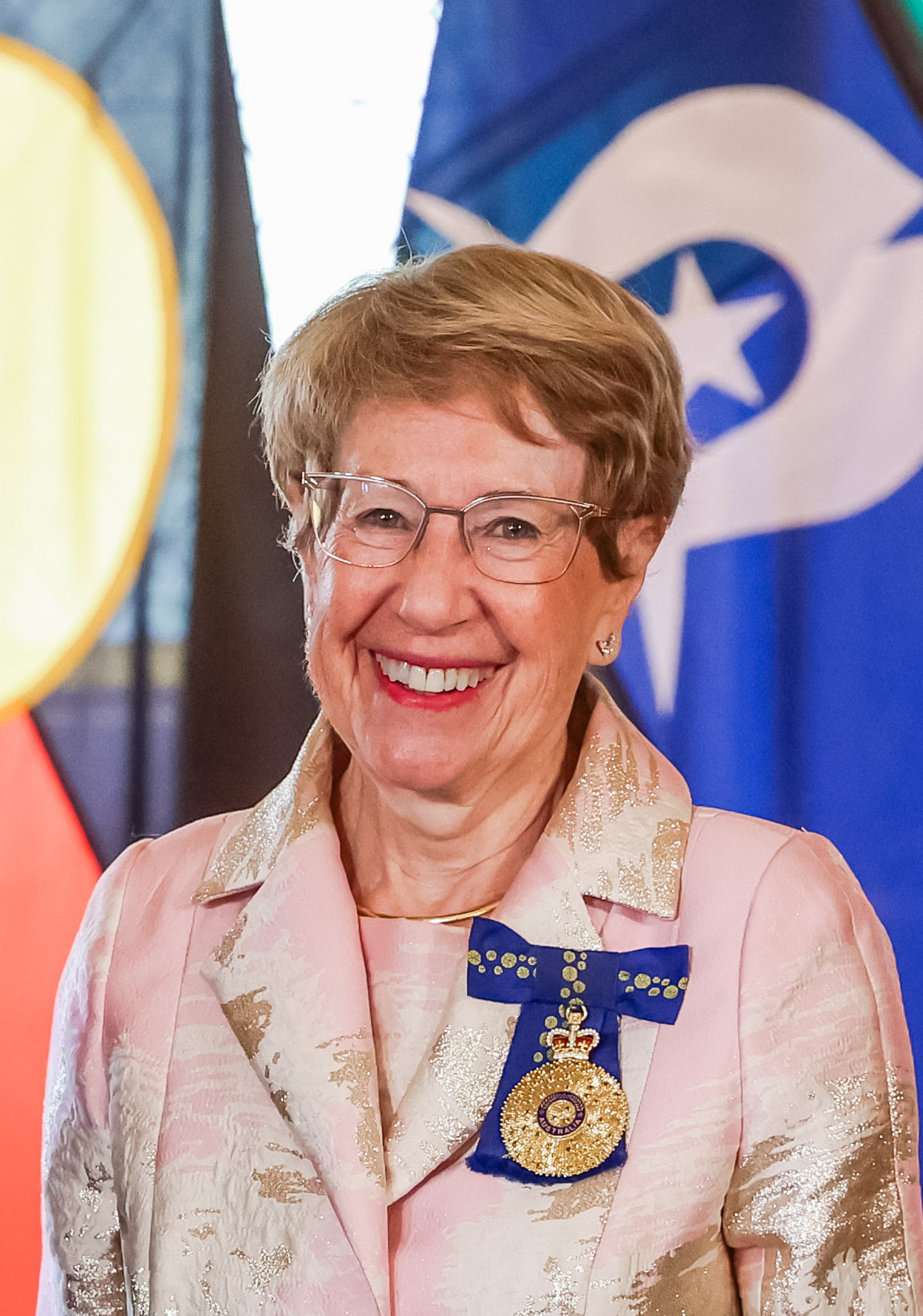
- Incumbent; Margaret Beazley; AC KC since 2 May 2019
- Viceregal
- Style: Her Excellency the Honourable
- Residence: Government House, Sydney
- Seat: Sydney
- Appointer: Monarch on the advice of the premier
- Term length: At His Majesty's pleasure (usually 5 years by convention)
- Formation: 7 February 1788
- First holder: Arthur Phillip
- Deputy: Lieutenant-Governor of New South Wales
- Salary: $529,000
- Website: governor.nsw.gov.au

The governor of New South Wales is the representative of the monarch, King Charles III, in the state of New South Wales. In an analogous way to the Governor-General of Australia at the national level, the governors of the Australian states perform constitutional and ceremonial functions at the state level. The governor is appointed by the monarch on the advice of the Premier of New South Wales, and serves in office for an unfixed period of time—known as serving At His Majesty's pleasure—though five years is the standard term of office. The current governor is retired judge Margaret Beazley, who succeeded David Hurley on 2 May 2019.

The office has its origin in the 18th-century colonial governors of New South Wales upon its settlement in 1788, and is the oldest continuous institution in Australia. The present incarnation of the position emerged with the Federation of Australia and the New South Wales Constitution Act 1902, which defined the viceregal office as the governor acting by and with the advice of the Executive Council of New South Wales. However, the post still ultimately represented the Government of the United Kingdom until, after continually decreasing involvement by the British government, the passage in 1942 of the Statute of Westminster Adoption Act 1942 (see Statute of Westminster) and the Australia Act 1986, after which the governor became the direct, personal representative of the sovereign.

== Appointment ==
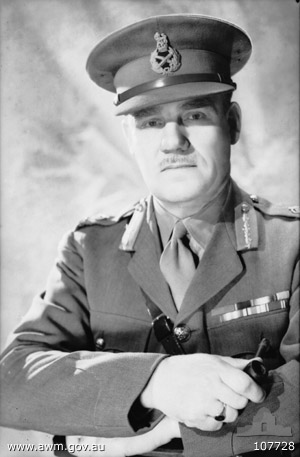
Sir John Northcott, the first Australian-born governor (1946–57).

The office of governor is prescribed by the New South Wales Constitution. The Monarch, on the advice and recommendation of the Premier of New South Wales, appoints the governor with a commission issued under the Royal sign-manual and Public Seal of the State, who is from then until being sworn in by the premier and chief justice referred to as the governor-designate.

Besides the administration of the oaths of office, there is no set formula for the swearing-in of a governor-designate. The constitution act stipulates: "Before assuming office, a person appointed to be Governor shall take the Oath or Affirmation of Allegiance and the Oath or Affirmation of Office in the presence of the Chief Justice or another Judge of the Supreme Court." The sovereign will also hold an audience with the appointee and will at that time induct the governor-designate as a Companion of the Order of Australia (AC).

The incumbent will generally serve for at least five years, though this is only a developed convention, and the governor still technically acts at His Majesty's pleasure (or the Royal Pleasure). The premier may therefore recommend to the King that the viceroy remain in his service for a longer period of time, sometimes upwards of more than seven years. A governor may also resign (Note: Sir David Martin resigned the viceregal post on 7 August 1990 due to health concerns. He died three days later.) and three have died in office. (Note: The following governors died in office: Sir Robert Duff on 15 March 1895; Sir Walter Davidson on 15 September 1923; and Sir David Anderson on 30 October 1936.) In such a circumstance, or if the governor leaves the country for longer than one month, the Lieutenant-Governor of New South Wales, concurrently held by the Chief Justice of New South Wales since 1872, serves as Administrator of the Government and exercises all powers of the governor. (Note: When Sir David Anderson died in office on 30 October 1936, the lieutenant governor, Sir Philip Street, served as Administrator until Lord Wakehurst was sworn in on 8 April 1937.) Furthermore, if the lieutenant governor becomes incapacitated while serving in the office of governor or is also absent from the state, the next most senior judge of the Supreme Court is sworn in as the administrator. (Note: Sir Leslie Herron, the lieutenant governor, died suddenly in May 1973 while the governor, Sir Roden Cutler, was overseas. Sir John Kerr became the administrator until Cutler was able to return.)

=== Selection ===
Between 1788 and 1957, all governors were born outside New South Wales and were often members of the peerage. Historian A. J. P. Taylor once noted that "going out and governing New South Wales became the British aristocracy's 'abiding consolation'". However, the position eventually became filled by Australians, with the first Australian-born governor, Sir John Northcott on 1 August 1946, being the first Australian-born governor of any state. However, as Northcott was born in Victoria, it was not until Sir Eric Woodward's appointment by Queen Elizabeth II in 1957 that the position was filled by a New South Welshman. This practice continued until 1996, when Queen Elizabeth II commissioned as her representative Gordon Samuels, a London-born immigrant to Australia.

Early governors were frequently former politicians, many being members of the House of Lords by virtue of their peerage; however they were required by the tenets of constitutional monarchy to be non-partisan while in office. The first governors were all military officers and the majority of governors since have come from a military background, numbering 19. Samuels was the first governor in New South Wales history without a political or common public service background—a former justice of the Supreme Court of New South Wales. The first woman to hold this position is also the first Lebanese-Australian governor, Dame Marie Bashir.

== Role ==
As the sovereign lives outside New South Wales, the Governor's primary task is to perform the Sovereign's constitutional duties on their behalf.

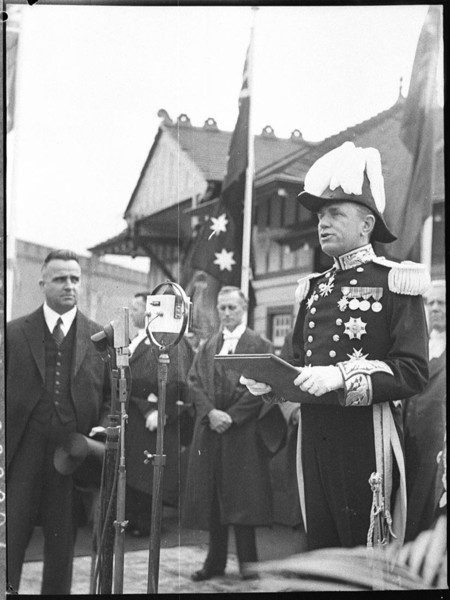
Lord Wakehurst takes the oath of office upon his arrival in Sydney in 1937.

The Governor is empowered by the Constitution Act 1902 to appoint the ministers of the Government of New South Wales. Convention dictates that the governor must select as premier an individual from Legislative Assembly that has the confidence of that body. The premier then advises the governor on who to appoint as ministers. The executive branch of government exercises power formally through the governor-in-council, the governor acting with the advice of the Executive Council of New South Wales. This council is made up of cabinet ministers and gives legal effect to decisions already reached in cabinet. While the governor must almost always act only on the advice of ministers, in exceptional circumstances they may act in the absence or contrary to advice—this is known as the reserve powers. The circumstances when these powers may be exercised is disputed, however in 1932 the governor justified the use of these powers to revoke the commission of premier Jack Lang during the 1932 New South Wales constitutional crisis on the grounds of alleged illegal activity by the premier.

The Governor alone is constitutionally mandated to summon Parliament and may also prorogue and dissolve it on the advice of the premier. The Governor grants Royal Assent in the King's name to bills as the final step required to give them the force of law. While in the past Governors had the discretion to refuse or reserve assent to bills, usually where they were seen as unfavourable to imperial interests, now the only likely grounds on which a bill could be refused if it was passed contrary to manner and form requirements (for example the requirement to hold a referendum to approve of any law that abolished or changed the powers of either of the houses of Parliament). A Governor's view that a bill is likely unconstitutional is not a ground for the reservation of royal assent as the legality of a bill is determined by the courts. With most constitutional functions delegated to Cabinet, the Governor acts in a primarily ceremonial fashion. The Governor hosts members of Australia's Royal Family, as well as foreign royalty and heads of state. Also as part of international relations, the Governor receives letters of credence and of recall from foreign Consuls-general appointed to Sydney.

The Governor is also tasked with fostering unity and pride. The governor inducts individuals into the various national orders and present national medals and decorations, however the most senior awards such as ACs or the Victoria Cross are the sole prerogative of the governor general. The Governor also ex-officio serves as Honorary Colonel of the Royal New South Wales Regiment (since 1960), Honorary Air Commodore of No. 22 (City of Sydney) Squadron, Royal Australian Air Force (since 1937) and an Honorary Commodore of the Royal Australian Navy, as well as the Chief Scout for New South Wales.

Although not a responsibility of the office of Governor of New South Wales, governors of New South Wales are – like all Governors of the Australian states – normally given a dormant commission to administer the government of the Commonwealth of Australia in the absence from Australia, or the death, incapacity or removal from office of the Governor-General by the Sovereign. New South Wales governors are often also appointed as a Deputy of the Governor-General to perform certain responsibilities of the Governor-General while the Governor-General is present in Australia, but unable to perform them personally.

== Symbols and protocol ==
The Governor is listed second in New South Wales' table of precedence, behind the Governor-General. The incumbent Governor is entitled to use the style of His or Her Excellency, while in office. On 28 November 2013 the Premier of NSW announced that the Queen had given approval for the title of "The Honourable" to be accorded to the governors and former Governors of New South Wales. Upon installation, the governor serves as a Deputy Prior of the Most Venerable Order of the Hospital of Saint John of Jerusalem in Australia and is also traditionally invested as either a Knight or Dame of Justice or Grace of the Order. It is also customary that the Governor is made a Companion of the Order of Australia, though this is not necessarily automatic. The use by the Governor of an elaborate uniform, comprising a plain blue tailcoat, scarlet collar and cuffs (embroidered in silver), silver epaulettes, and a plumed bicorne hat, fell out of use with the appointment of the first Australian-born Governor, Sir John Northcott, in 1946.

The musical vice regal salute—composed of the first and last four bars of the national anthem ("Advance Australia Fair")—is played on the arrival and departure of the Governor from a formal event in which a military or service guard is present. It is optional to play if no guard is at the event.

To mark the Governor's presence at any building, ship, aeroplane, or car in Australia, the Governor's standard or flag is employed. Following the example of other states adopting unique Governor's standards, in 1980 the Government of New South Wales sought to introduce a new standard for the Governor to replace the Union Flag that had been in use since 1788. Premier Neville Wran wrote to the Governor, Sir Roden Cutler, on 25 November 1980 advising: "His Excellency’s Ministers of State now consider that there should be a change in the Personal Standard of the Governor of New South Wales, such change to take effect at the conclusion of His Excellency’s term of office. The Premier therefore recommends for approval a change in the Governor’s distinctive flag from the Union Flag to the New South Wales State Flag with a Crown surmounting the State badge in the fly." However, Cutler did not agree with this change, and it was recommended that the change be undertaken after he had left office. The new Governor's Standard was designed and presented by the Garter King of Arms to the Agent-General for New South Wales in London on 8 January 1981, who then sought Royal assent of the new design, which was given on 15 January 1981. The flag was first flown on 20 January 1981 over Parliament House for the official swearing-in of Governor Sir James Rowland, and was flown for the first time over Government House on 29 January 1981.

Past and present standards of the governor

1788–1800

1800–1981

1981–present

== History ==
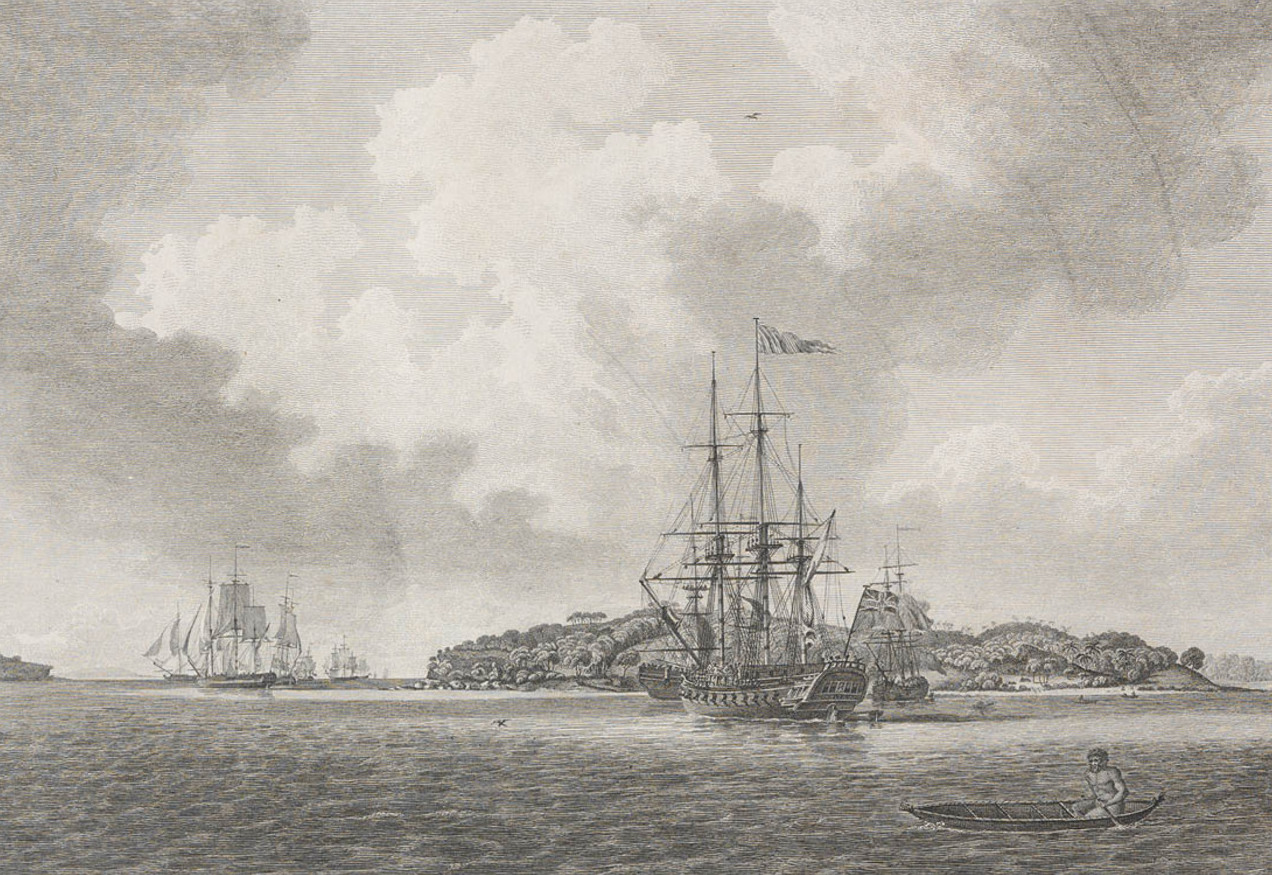
The First Fleet in Botany Bay at voyage's end in 1788. Its arrival marked the establishment of the colony of New South Wales and the office of the governor.

Aside from the Crown itself, the office of Governor of New South Wales is the oldest constitutional office in Australia. Captain Arthur Phillip assumed office as Governor of New South Wales on 7 February 1788, when the Colony of New South Wales, the first British settlement in Australia, was formally proclaimed. The early colonial governors held an almost autocratic power due to the distance from and poor communications with Great Britain, until 1824 when the New South Wales Legislative Council, Australia's first legislative body, was appointed to advise the governor.

Between 1850 and 1861, the Governor of New South Wales was titled Governor-General, in an early attempt at federalism imposed by Earl Grey. All communication between the Australian colonies and the British Government was meant to go through the Governor-General, and the other colonies had lieutenant-Governors. As South Australia (1836), Tasmania (January 1855) and Victoria (May 1855) obtained responsible government, their lieutenant-Governors were replaced by Governors. Although he had ceased acting as a Governor-General, Sir William Denison retained the title until his retirement in 1861.

The six British colonies in Australia joined to form the Commonwealth of Australia in 1901. New South Wales and the other colonies became states in the federal system under the Constitution of Australia. In 1902, the New South Wales Constitution Act 1902 confirmed the modern system of government of New South Wales as a state. Like the new federal Governor-General and the other state governors, in the first years after federation, the governor of New South Wales continued to act both in their constitutional role, and as a liaison between the local government and the imperial government in London.

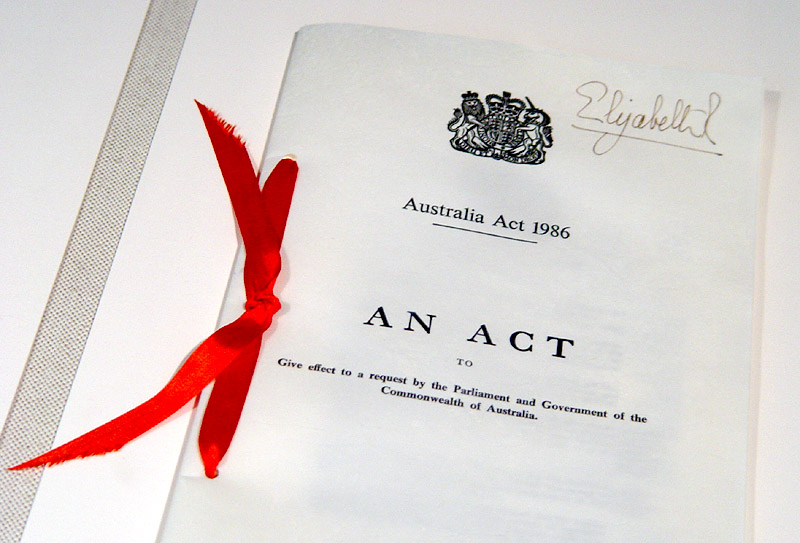
The copy of the Australia Act 1986 (UK) bearing the Queen's signature, now displayed in Canberra

In 1942, the Commonwealth of Australia passed the Statute of Westminster Adoption Act 1942, which rendered Australia dominion status under the Statute of Westminster, and while Australia and Britain share the same person as monarch, that person acts in a distinct capacity when acting as the monarch of each dominion. The convention that the monarch acts in respect of Australian affairs on the advice of his or her Australian ministers, rather than his or her British ministers, became enshrined in law. For New South Wales however, because the Statute of Westminster did not disturb the constitutional arrangements of the Australian states, the governor remained (at least formally) in New South Wales the representative of the British monarch. This arrangement seemed incongruous with the Commonwealth of Australia's independent dominion status conferred by the Statute of Westminster, and with the federal structure.

After much negotiation between the federal and state governments of Australia, the British government and Buckingham Palace, the Australia Act 1986 removed any remaining constitutional roles of the British monarch and British government in the Australian states, and established that the governor of New South Wales (along with the other state governors) was the direct, personal representative of the Australian monarch, and not the British monarch or the British government, nor the governor-general of Australia or the Australian federal government.

== Residences and household ==
=== Government House ===
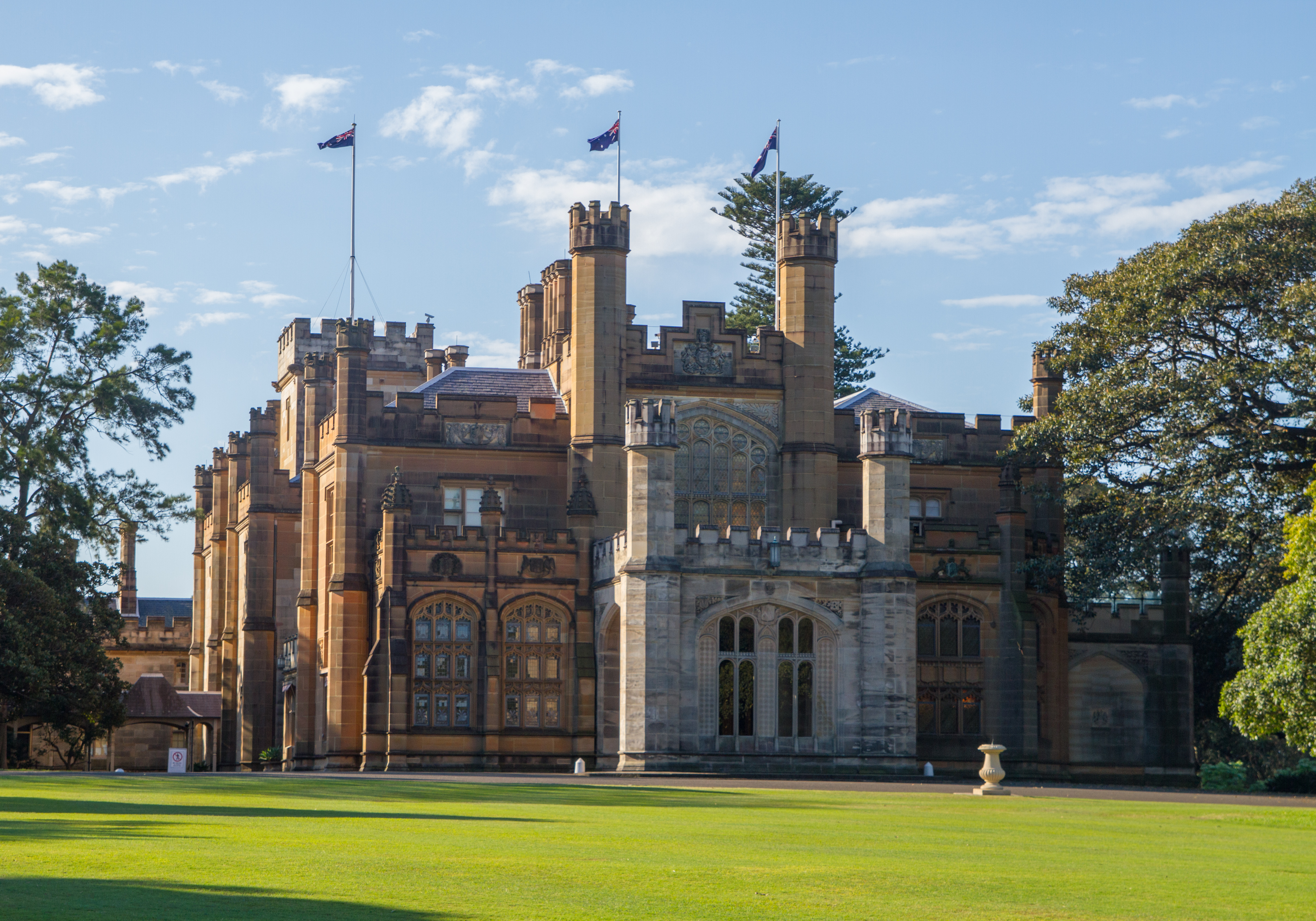
Government House, Sydney, the official residence of the governor

On his arrival in Sydney in 1788, Governor Phillip resided in a temporary wood and canvas house before the construction of a more substantial house on a site now bounded by Bridge and Phillip Streets. This first Government House was extended and repaired by the following eight governors, but was generally in poor condition and was vacated when the governor relocated to the new building in 1845, designed by Edward Blore and Mortimer Lewis.

With the federation of the Australian colonies in 1901, it was announced that Government House was to serve as the secondary residence of the new governor-general of Australia. As a consequence the NSW Government leased the residence of Cranbrook, Bellevue Hill as the residence of the governor. This arrangement lasted until 1913 when the NSW Government terminated the Commonwealth lease of Government House (the governor-general moved to the new Sydney residence of Admiralty House), the governor from 1913 to 1917, Sir Gerald Strickland, continued to live in Cranbrook and on his departure his successor returned to Government House.

On 16 January 1996, Premier Bob Carr announced that the next governor would be Gordon Samuels, that he would not live or work at Government House and that he would retain his appointment as chairman of the New South Wales Law Reform Commission. On these changes, Carr said: "The Office of the Governor should be less associated with pomp and ceremony, less encumbered by anachronistic protocol, more in tune with the character of the people." The state's longest-serving governor, Sir Roden Cutler, was also reported as saying: "It's a political push to make way in New South Wales to lead the push for a republic. If they decide not to have a Governor and the public agrees with that, and Parliament agrees, and the Queen agrees to it, that is a different matter, but while there is a Governor you have got to give him some respectability and credibility, because he is the host for the whole of New South Wales. For the life of me I cannot understand the logic of having a Governor who is part-time and doesn't live at Government House. It is such a degrading of the office and of the Governor."

In October 2011, the new premier, Barry O'Farrell, announced that the Governor, now Dame Marie Bashir, had agreed with O'Farrell's offer to move back into Government House: "A lot of people believe the Governor should live at Government House. That's what it was built for ... [A]t some stage a rural or regional Governor will be appointed and we will need to provide accommodation at Government House so it makes sense to provide appropriate living areas". With the Governor's return, management of the residence reverted to the Office of the Governor in December 2013.

=== Summer residence ===
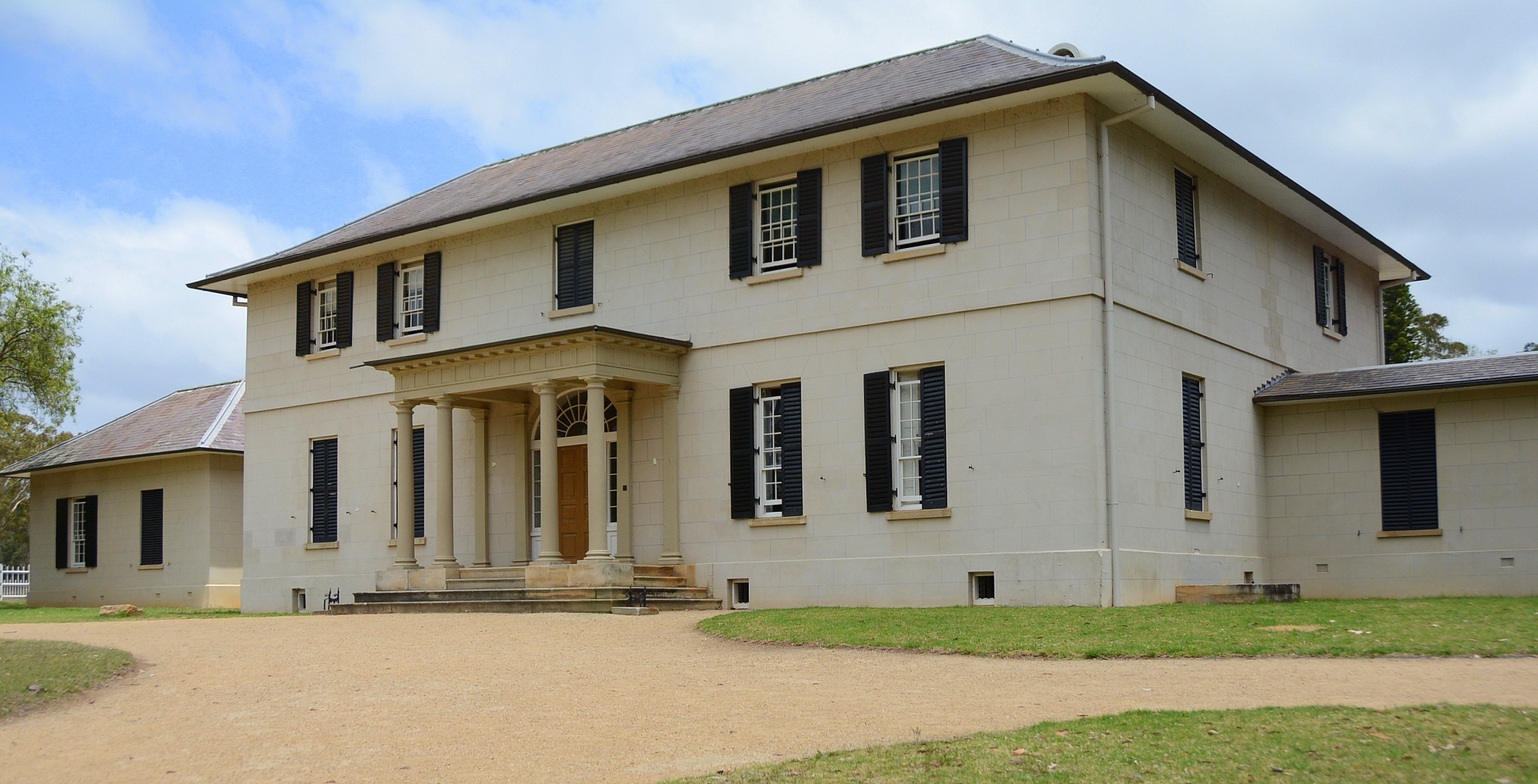
"Old" Government House, Parramatta.

In addition to the primary Sydney Vice-Regal residence, many Governors had also felt the need for a 'summer retreat' to escape the hard temperatures of the Sydney summers. In 1790, Governor Phillip had a secondary residence built in the township of Parramatta. In 1799 the second governor, John Hunter, had the remains of Arthur Phillip's cottage cleared away, and a more permanent building erected on the same site. This residence remained occupied until the completion of the primary Government House in 1845, however the hard summers and growing size of Sydney convinced successive governors of the need for a rural residence.

The governor from 1868 to 1872, the Earl Belmore, used Throsby Park in Moss Vale as his summer residence. His successor, Sir Hercules Robinson, often retired privately to the same area, in the Southern Highlands, for the same reason. In 1879 it was then decided that the colony should purchase a house at Sutton Forest for use as a permanent summer residence, and in 1881 the NSW Government purchased for £6000 a property known as "Prospect" that had been built by Robert Pemberton Richardson (of the firm Richardson & Wrench). This was renamed "Hillview", and became the primary summer governor's residence from 1885 to 1957. In 1957, seen as unnecessary and expensive, Hillview was put up for sale and purchased from the state government by Edwin Klein. Hillview was returned to the people of NSW in 1985 and is currently leased under the ownership of the Environment and Heritage Group of the Department of Planning & Environment.

=== Household ===
The viceregal household aids the governor in the execution of the royal constitutional and ceremonial duties and is managed by the Office of the Governor, whose current official secretary and chief of staff is Michael Miller LVO, RFD. These organised offices and support systems include aides-de-camp, press officers, financial managers, speech writers, trip organisers, event planners and protocol officers, chefs and other kitchen employees, waiters, and various cleaning staff, as well as tour guides. In this official and bureaucratic capacity, the entire household is often referred to as Government House. These departments are funded through the annual budget, as is the governor's salary of $529,000.

== List of Governors of New South Wales ==
The following individuals have served as a Governor of New South Wales:

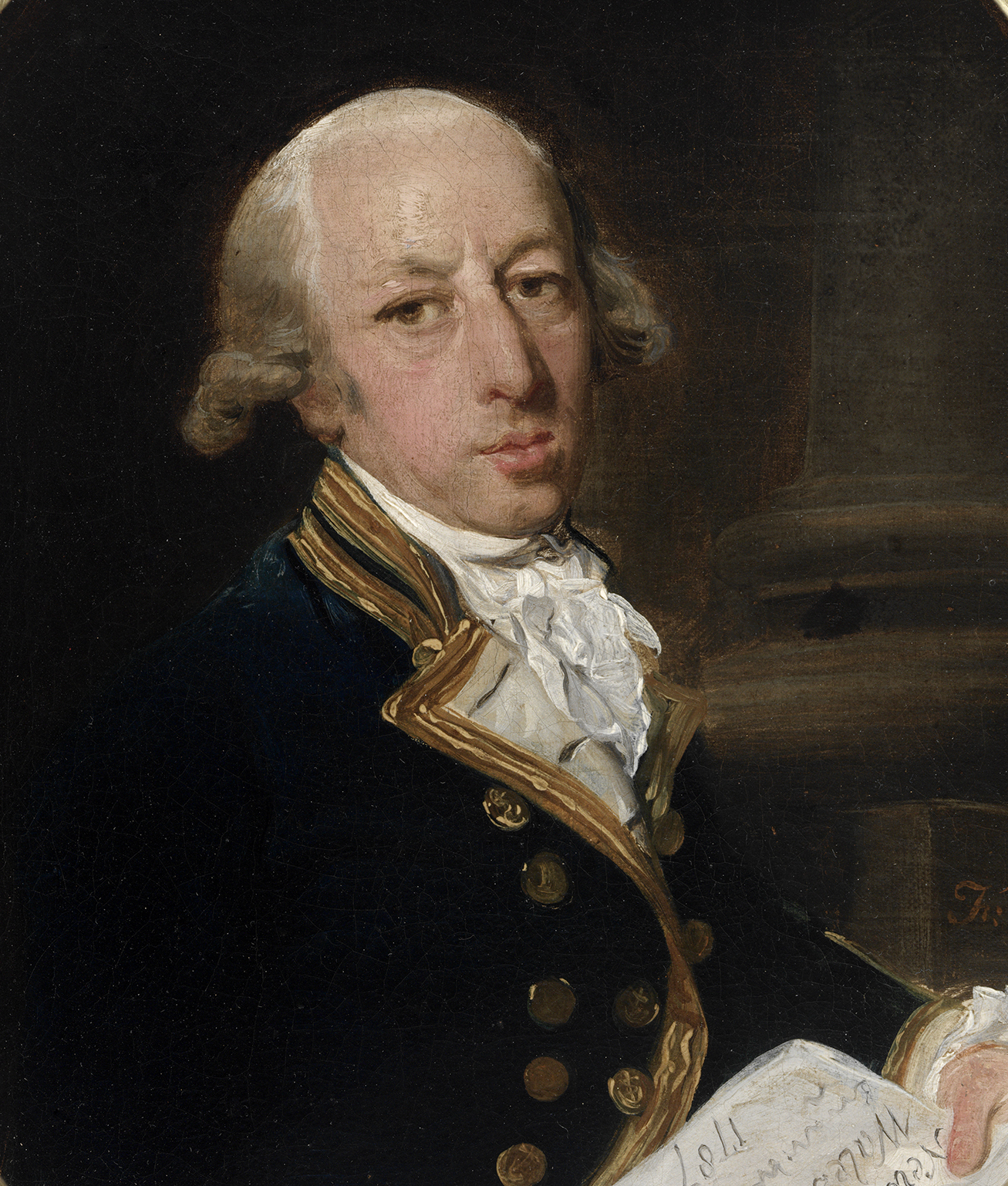
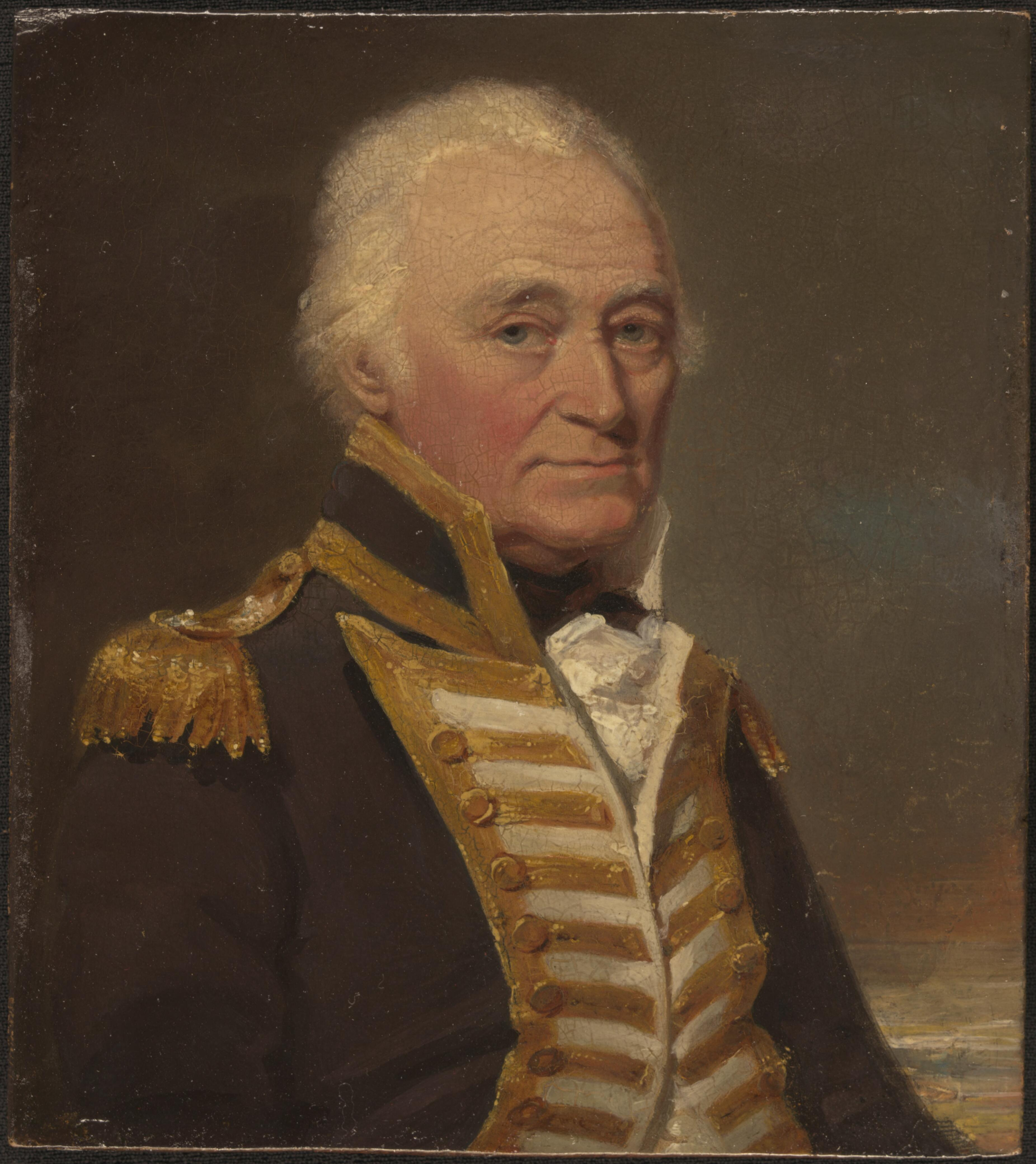
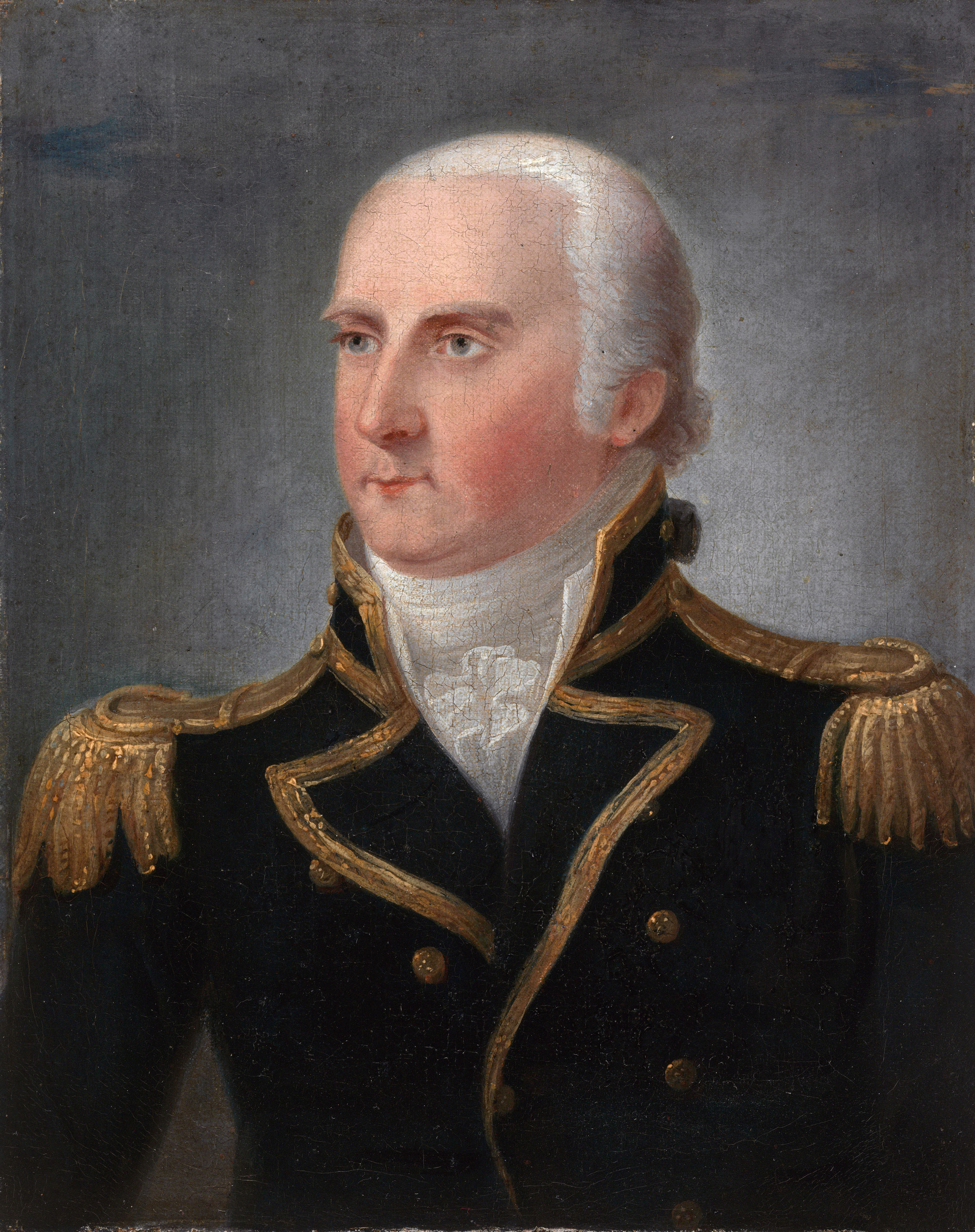
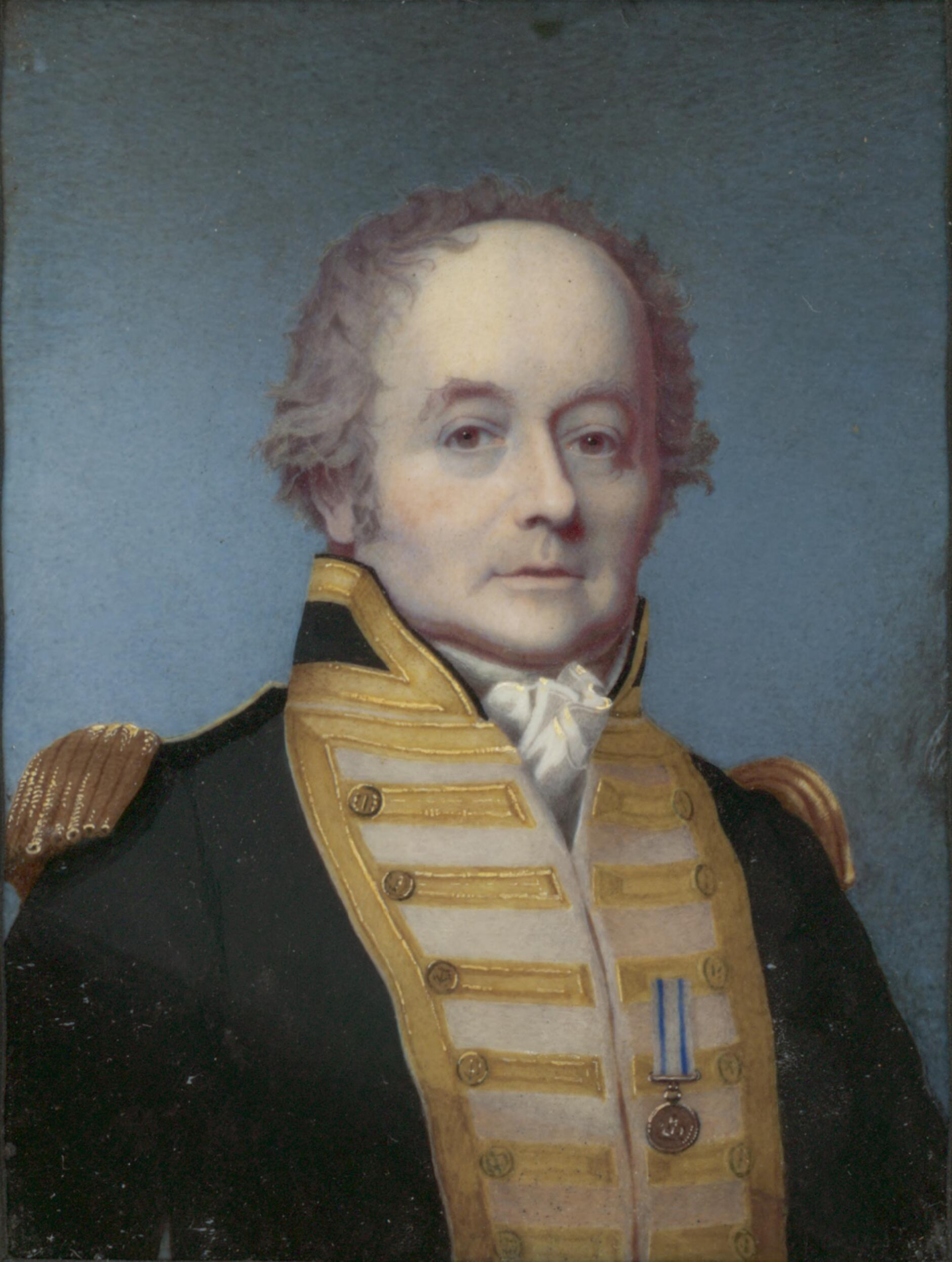
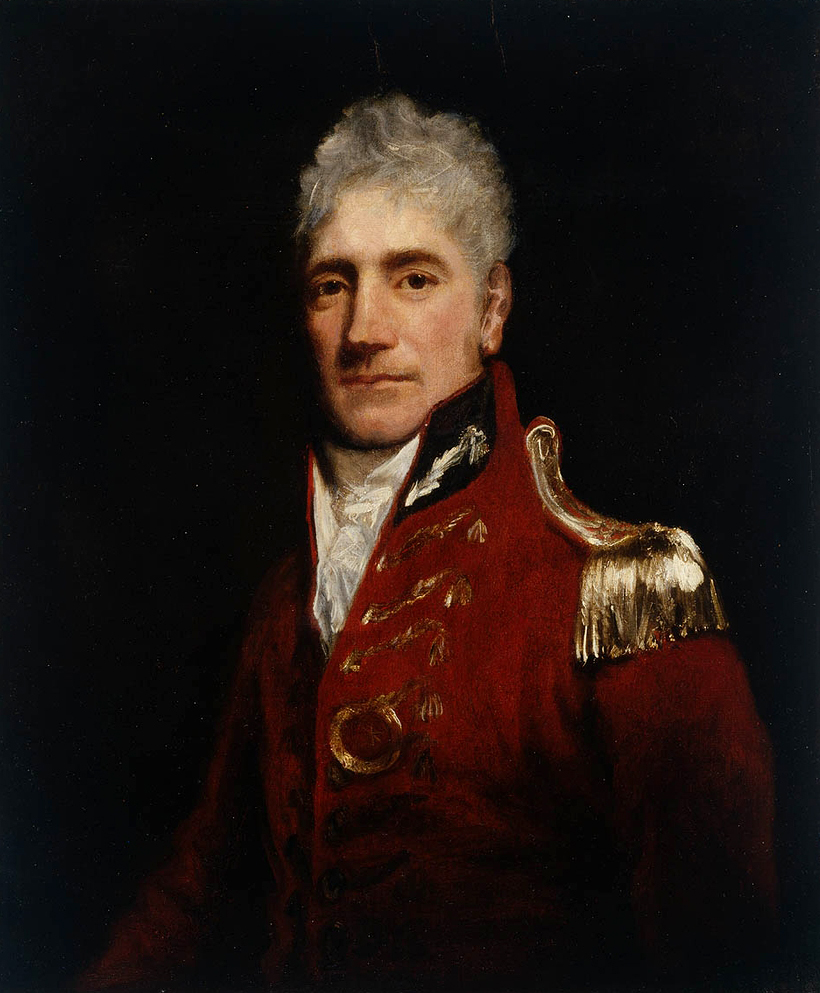
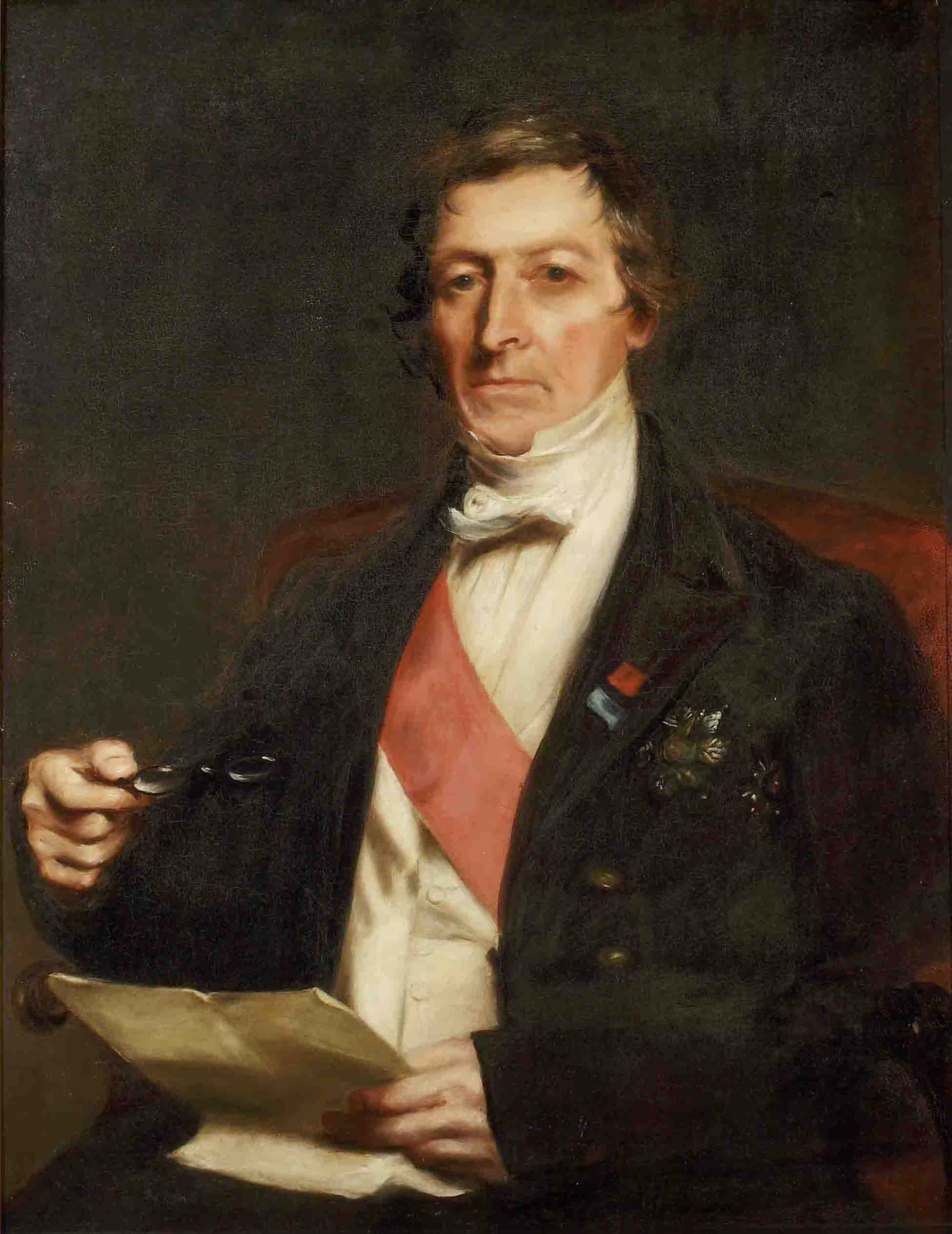
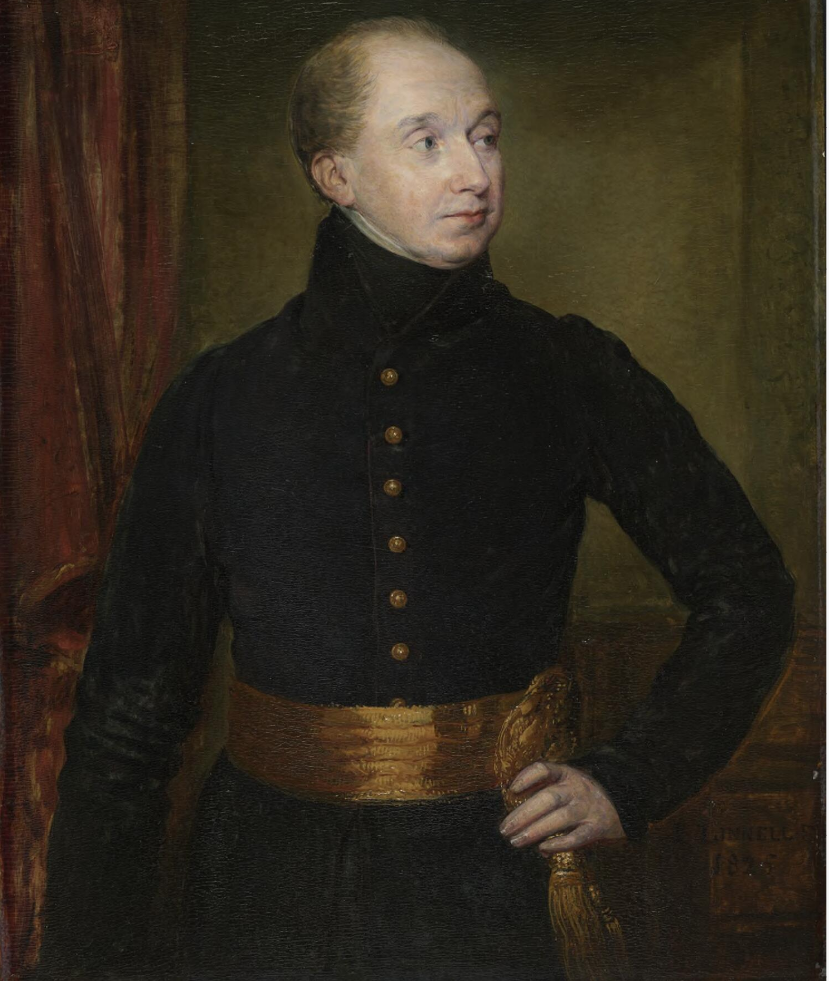
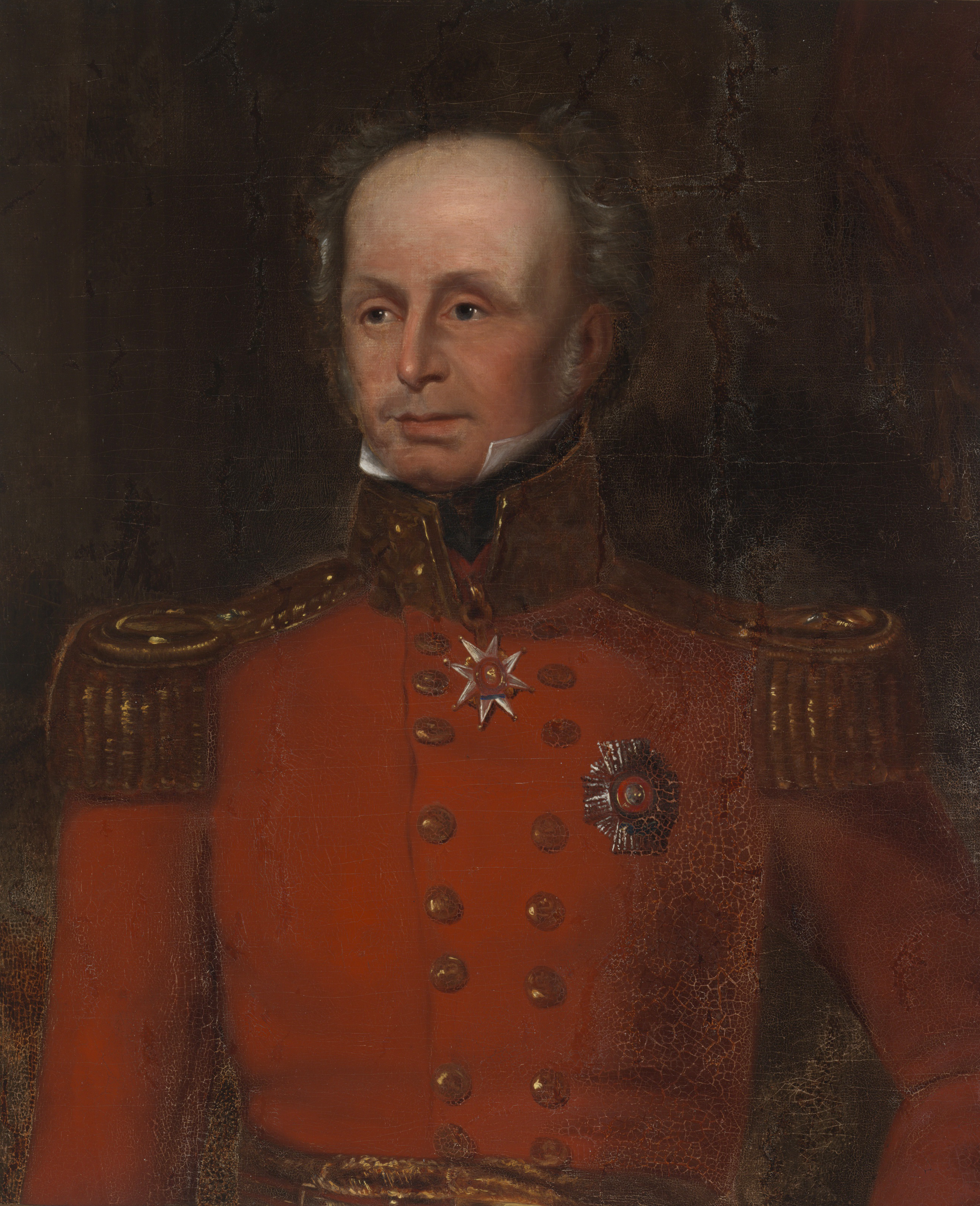
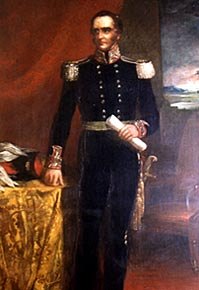
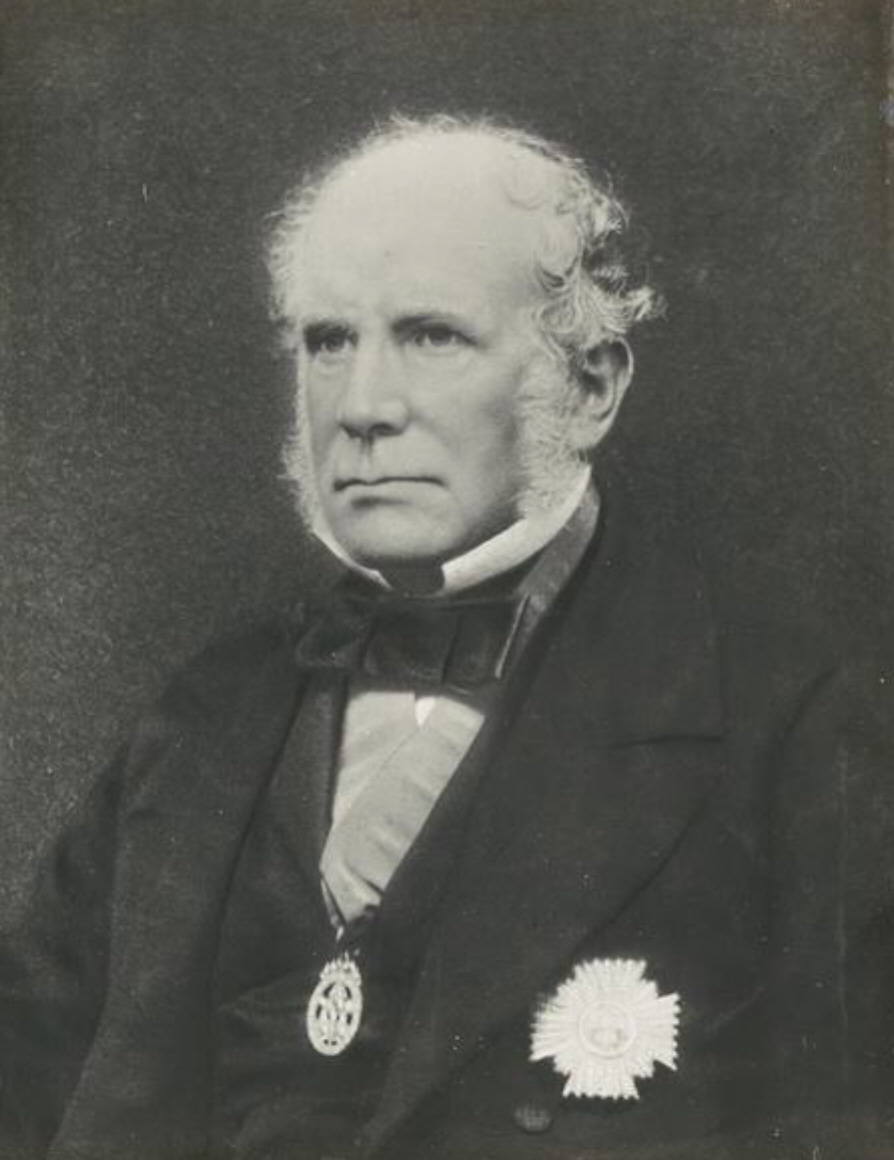
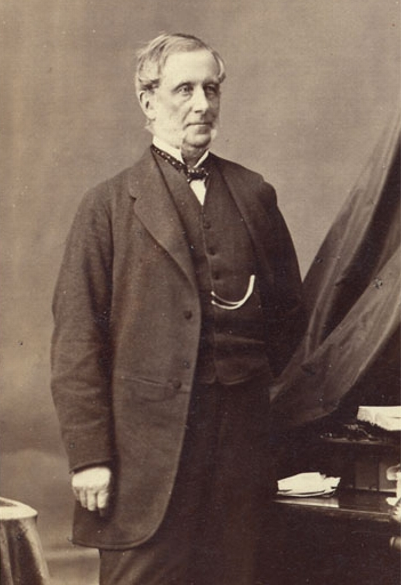
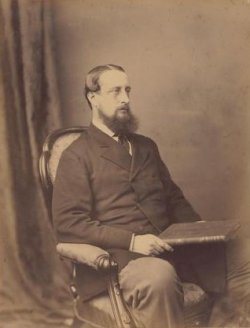
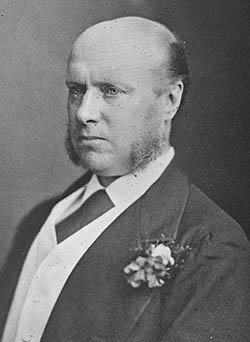
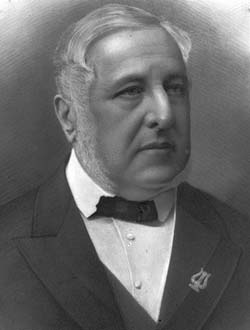
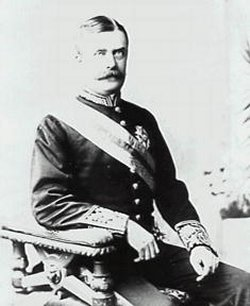
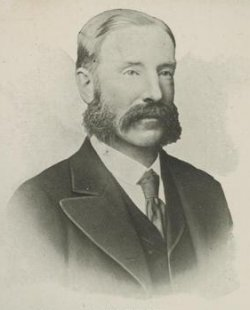
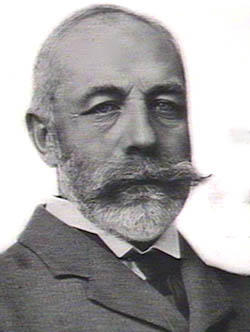
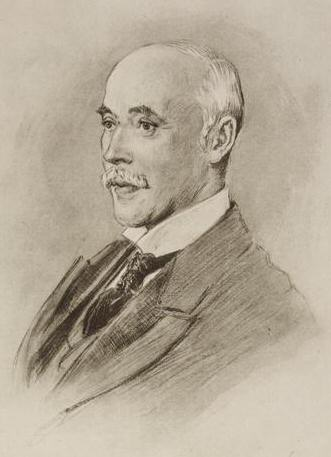
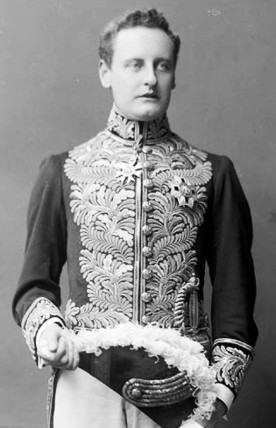
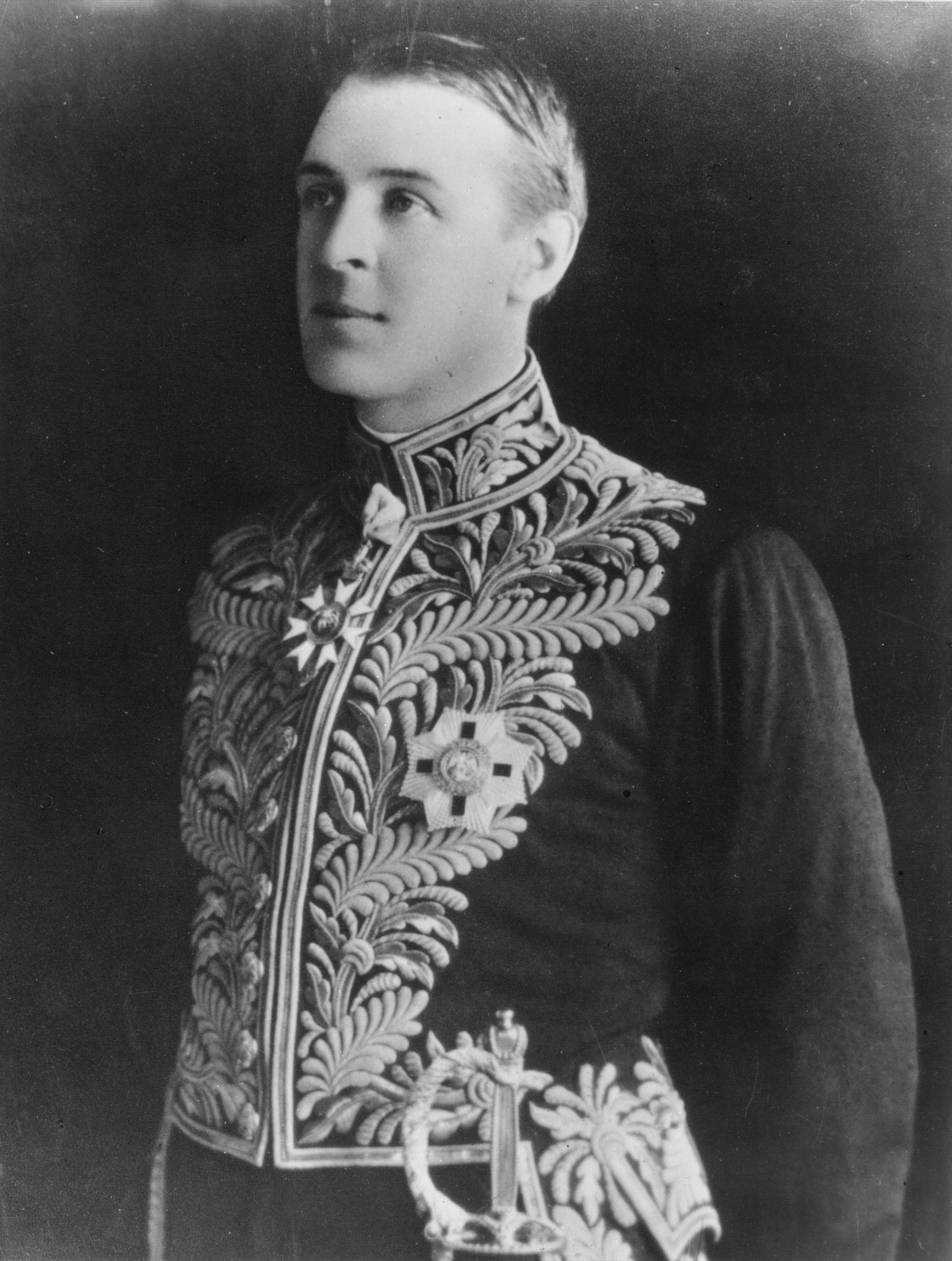
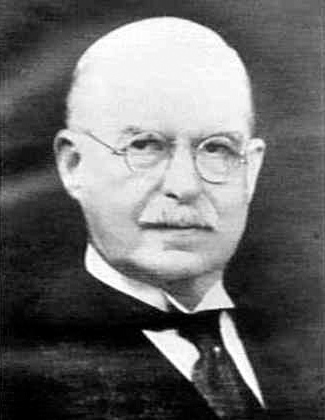
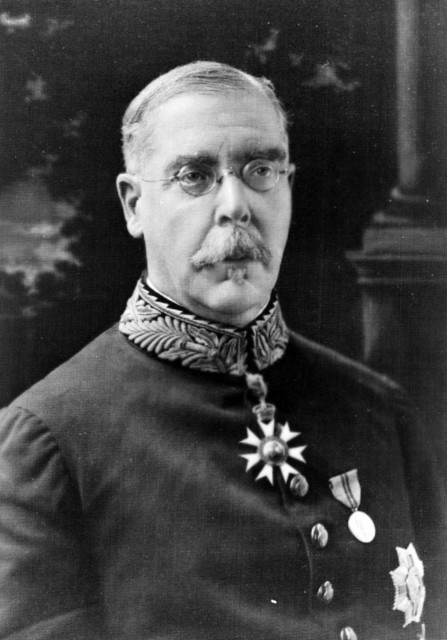
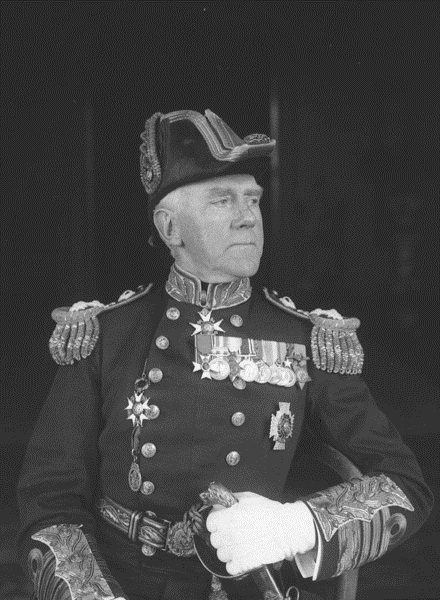
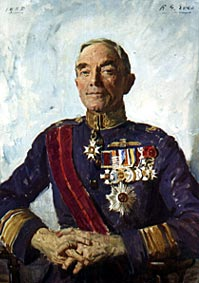
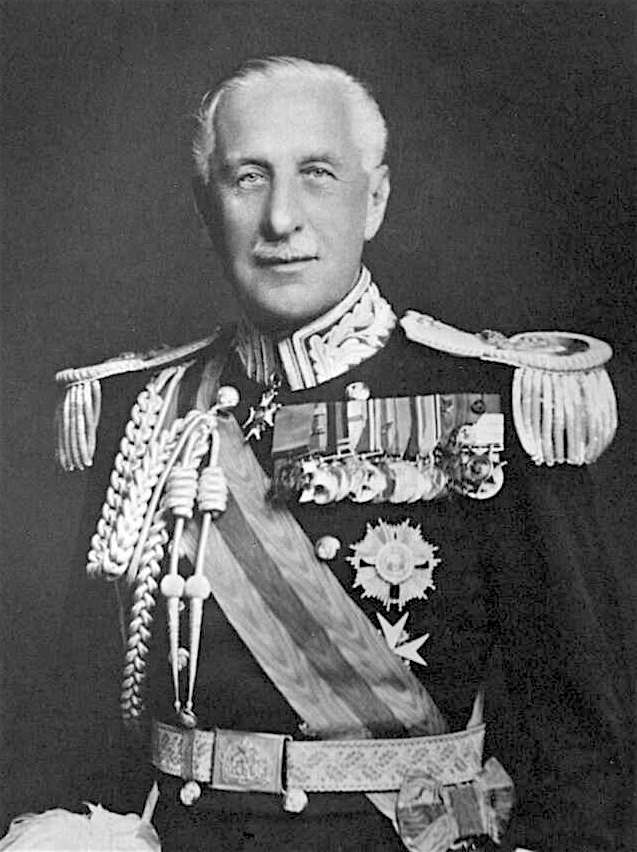
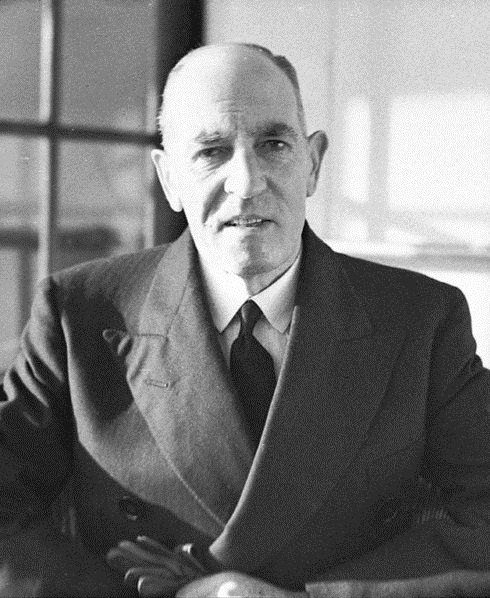
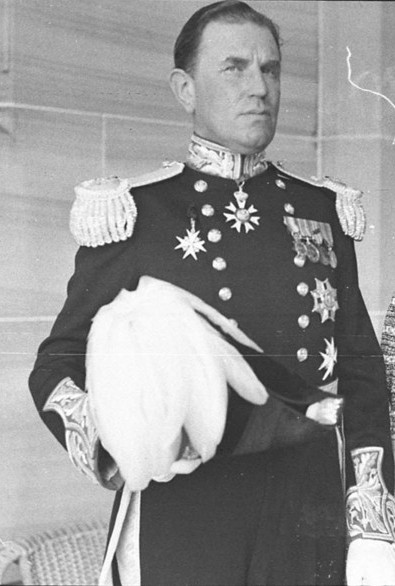
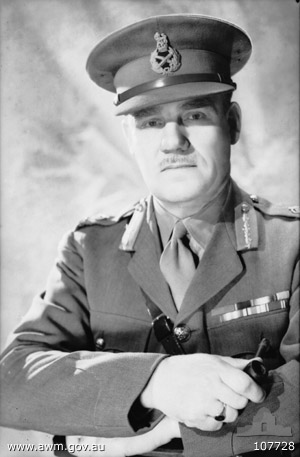
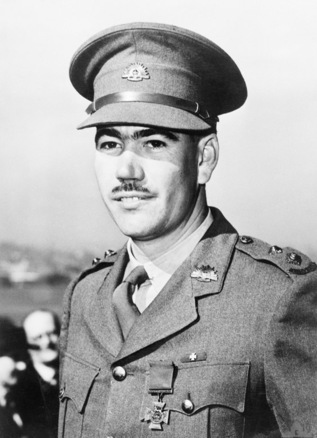
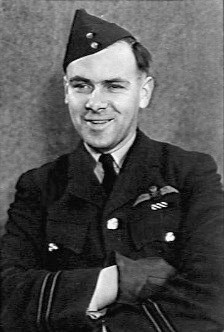
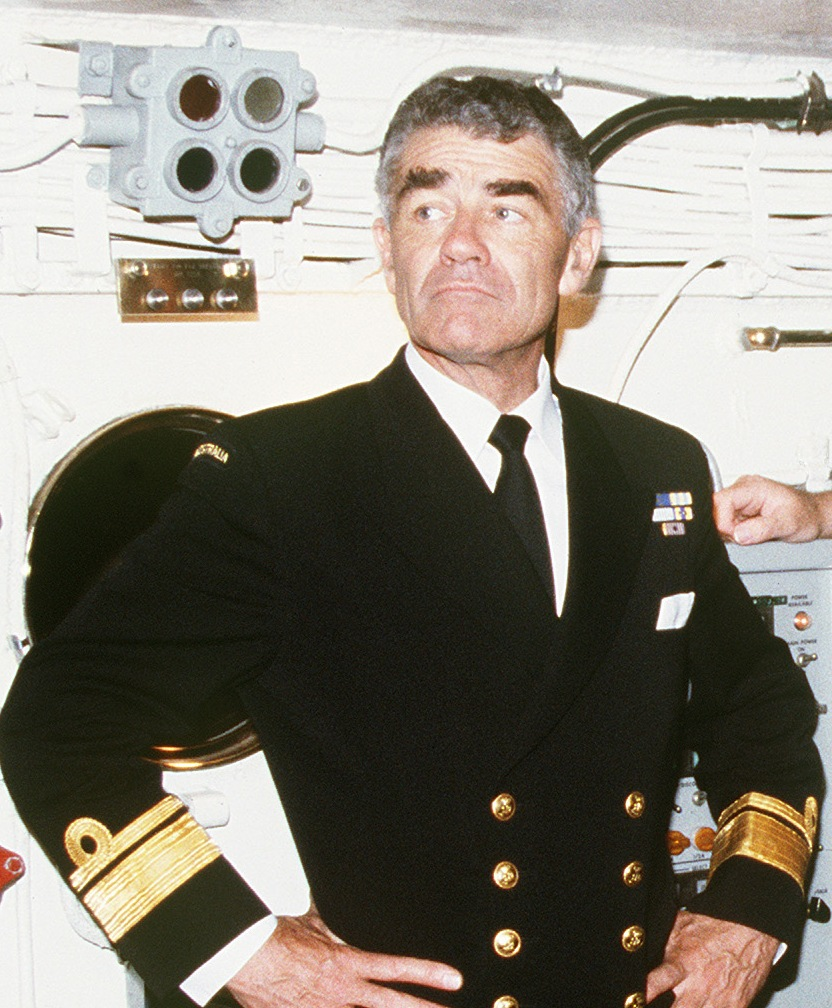
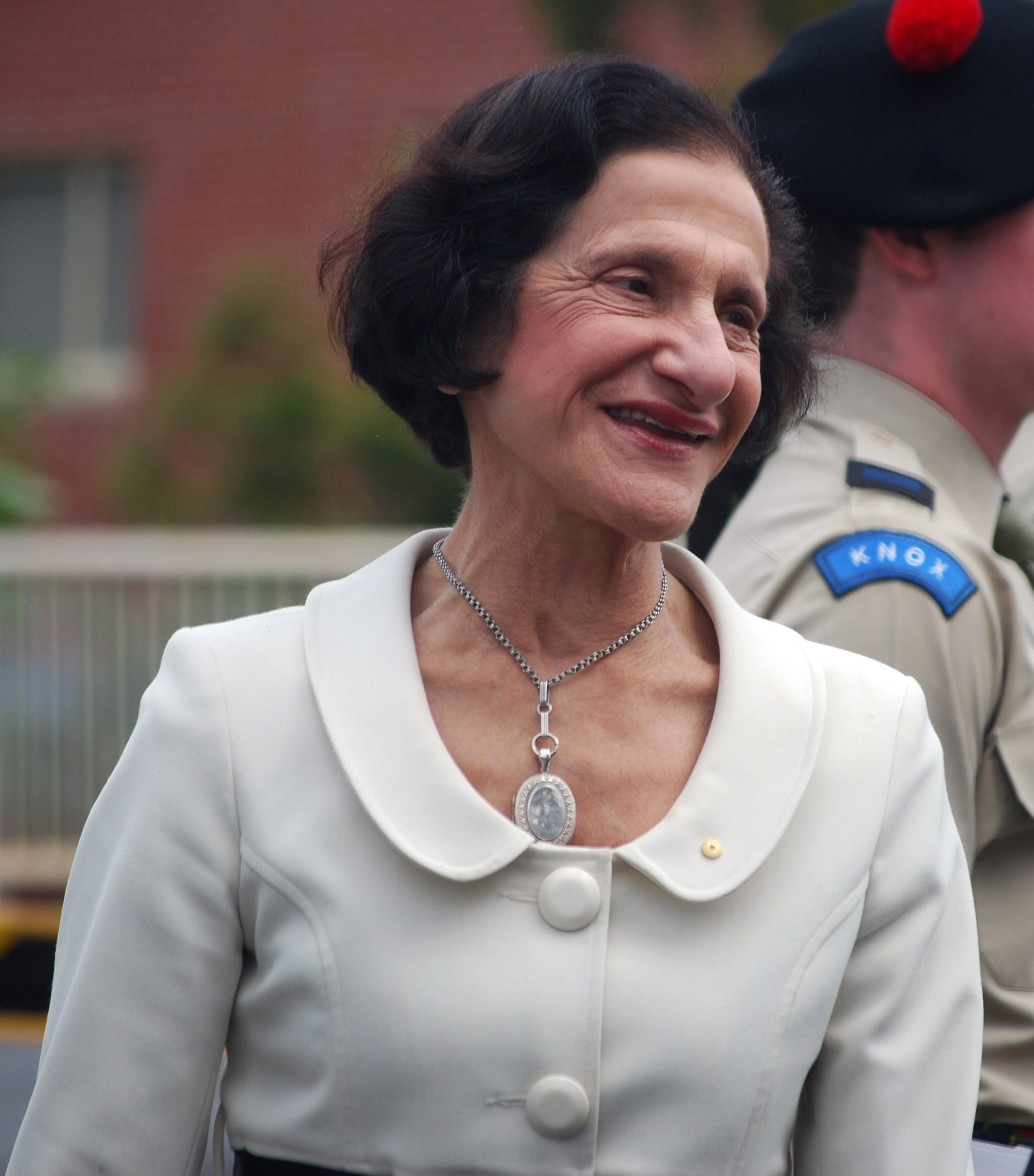
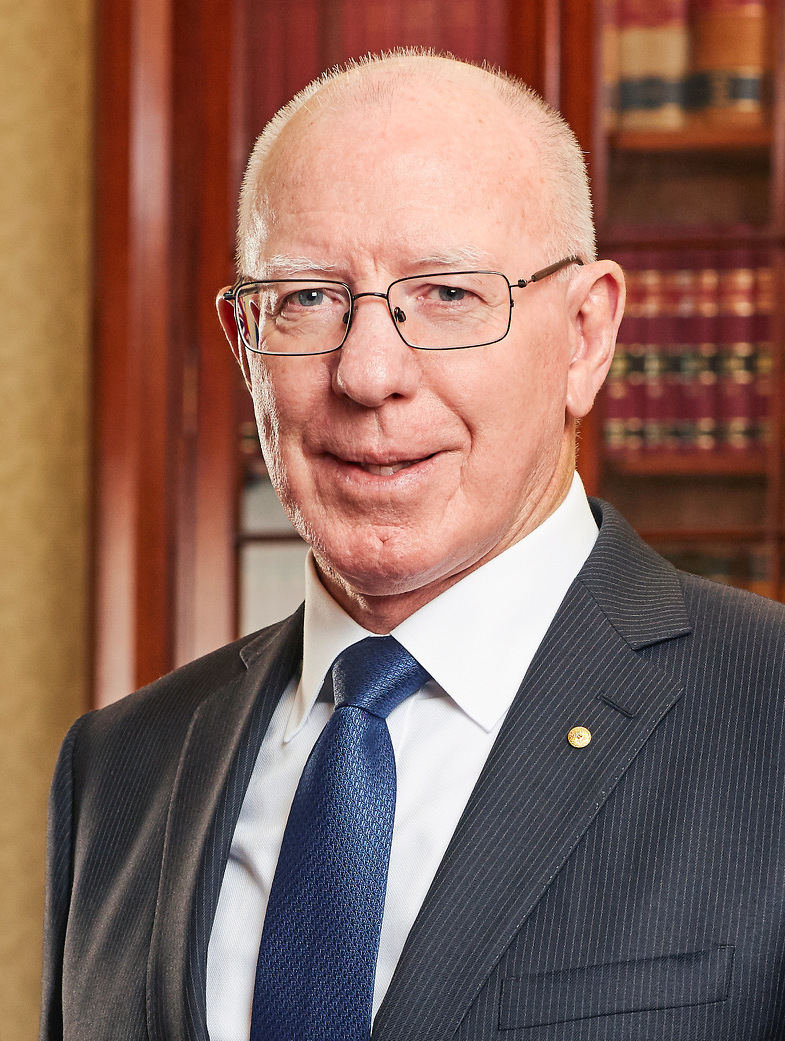
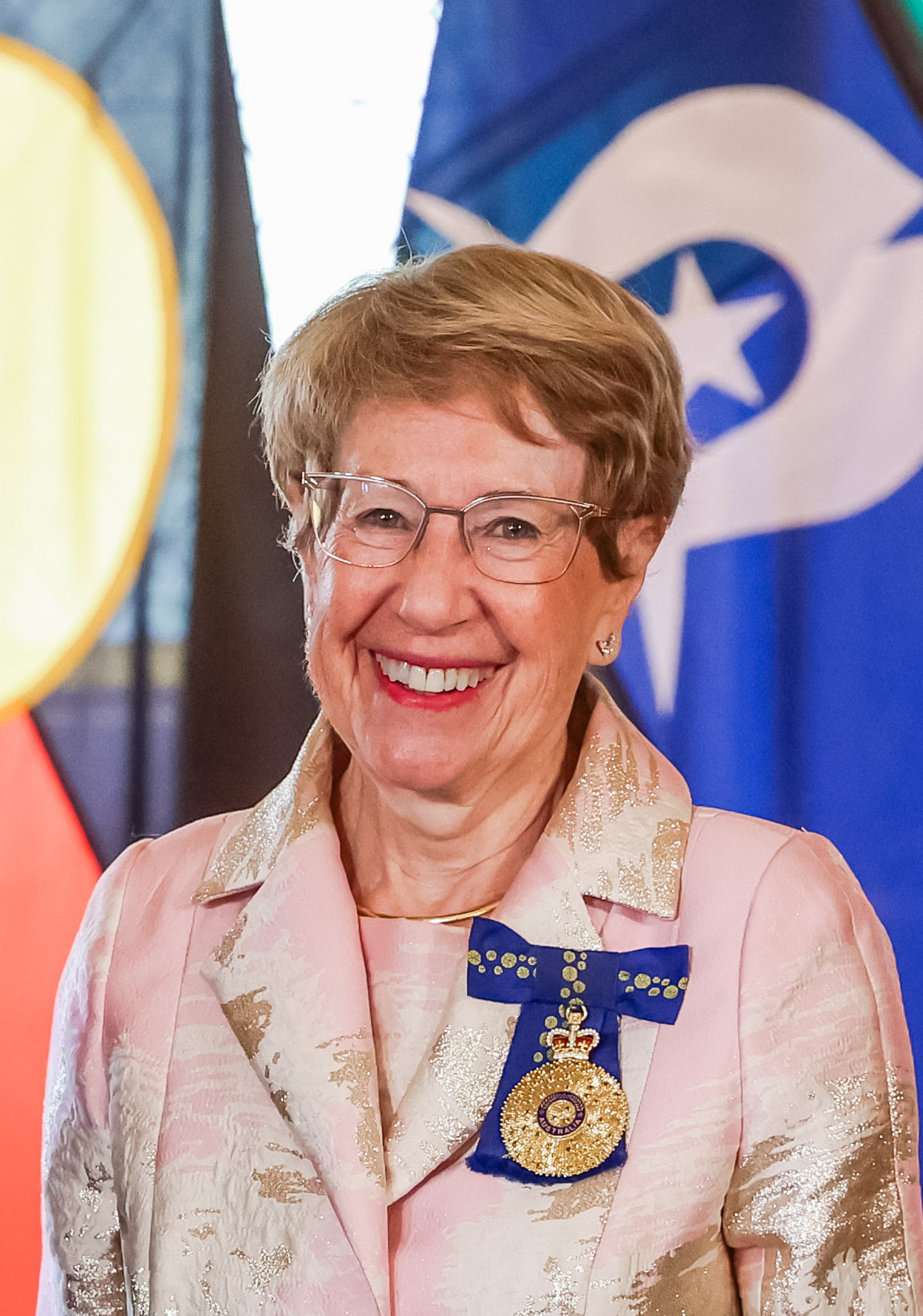
No.	Portrait	Governor	Term start	Term end	Time in office
Governors appointed by George III (1760–1820):
1		Captain Arthur Phillip	7 February 1788	10 December 1792	4 years, 307 days
2		Captain John Hunter	11 September 1795	27 September 1800	5 years, 16 days
3		Captain Philip Gidley King	28 September 1800	12 August 1806	5 years, 318 days
4		Captain William Bligh	13 August 1806	26 January 1808	1 year, 166 days
5		Major-General Lachlan Macquarie	1 January 1810	1 December 1821	11 years, 334 days
Governors appointed by George IV (1820–1830):
6		Major-General Sir Thomas Brisbane	1 December 1821	1 December 1825	4 years, 0 days
7		Lieutenant General Sir Ralph Darling	19 December 1825	21 October 1831	5 years, 306 days
Governors appointed by William IV (1830–1837):
8		Major-General Sir Richard Bourke	3 December 1831	5 December 1837	6 years, 2 days
Governors appointed by Queen Victoria (1837–1901):
9		Major Sir George Gipps	24 February 1838	11 July 1846	8 years, 137 days
10		Lieutenant Colonel Sir Charles Augustus FitzRoy	3 August 1846	28 January 1855	8 years, 178 days
11		Sir William Denison	20 January 1855	22 January 1861	6 years, 2 days
12		Sir John Young	16 May 1861	24 December 1867	6 years, 222 days
13		Somerset Lowry-Corry, 4th Earl Belmore	8 January 1868	21 February 1872	4 years, 44 days
14		Sir Hercules Robinson	3 June 1872	19 March 1879	6 years, 289 days
15		Lord Augustus Loftus	4 August 1879	9 November 1885	6 years, 97 days
16		Charles Wynn-Carington, 3rd Baron Carrington	12 December 1885	3 November 1890	4 years, 326 days
17		Victor Child Villiers, 7th Earl of Jersey	15 January 1891	2 March 1893	2 years, 46 days
18		Sir Robert Duff	29 May 1893	15 March 1895	2 years, 291 days
19		Henry Brand, 2nd Viscount Hampden	21 November 1895	5 March 1899	3 years, 104 days
20		William Lygon, 7th Earl Beauchamp	18 May 1899	30 April 1901	1 year, 347 days
Governors appointed by Edward VII (1901–1910):
21		Admiral Sir Harry Rawson	27 May 1902	27 May 1909	7 years, 0 days
22		Frederic Thesiger, 3rd Baron Chelmsford	28 May 1909	11 March 1913	3 years, 287 days
Governors appointed by George V (1910–1936):
23		Sir Gerald Strickland	14 March 1913	27 October 1917	4 years, 227 days
24		Sir Walter Davidson	18 February 1918	4 September 1923	5 years, 198 days
25		Admiral Sir Dudley de Chair	28 February 1924	7 April 1930	6 years, 38 days
26		Air Vice Marshal Sir Philip Game	29 May 1930	15 January 1935	4 years, 231 days
27		Alexander Hore-Ruthven, 1st Baron Gowrie	21 February 1935	22 January 1936	335 days
Governors appointed by Edward VIII (1936):
28		Admiral Sir Murray Anderson	6 August 1936	30 October 1936	85 days
Governors appointed by George VI (1936–1952):
29		John Loder, 2nd Baron Wakehurst	8 April 1937	8 January 1946	8 years, 275 days
30		Lieutenant General Sir John Northcott	1 August 1946	31 July 1957	10 years, 364 days
Governors appointed by Queen Elizabeth II (1952–2022):
31		Lieutenant General Sir Eric Woodward	1 August 1957	31 July 1965	7 years, 364 days
32		Sir Roden Cutler	20 January 1966	19 January 1981	14 years, 365 days
33		Air Marshal Sir James Rowland	20 January 1981	20 January 1989	8 years, 0 days
34		Rear Admiral Sir David Martin	20 January 1989	7 August 1990	1 year, 199 days
35		Rear Admiral Peter Sinclair	8 August 1990	29 February 1996	5 years, 205 days
36		Gordon Samuels	1 March 1996	28 February 2001	4 years, 364 days
37		Professor Dame Marie Bashir	1 March 2001	1 October 2014	13 years, 214 days
38		General David Hurley (Retd)	2 October 2014	1 May 2019	4 years, 211 days
39		Margaret Beazley	2 May 2019	Incumbent	7 years, 128 days

== See also ==
- Spouse of the governor of New South Wales
- Governor-General of Australia
- Governors of the Australian states
- Governor's Body Guard of Light Horse
