= Robert Samuels =

Robert Samuels may refer to:

- Robert Samuels (cricketer)
- Robert Samuels (journalist)

== See also ==
- Robert Samuel, English priest and martyr
