= Stanford Samuels =

Stanford Samuels may refer to:

- Stanford Samuels Jr. (born 1980), American football cornerback
- Stanford Samuels III (born 1999), American football cornerback
