= Adolph Samelson =

English physician

- Born: 6 September 1817; Berlin, Germany
- Died: January 12, 1888 (aged 70)
- Occupation: Physician

Adolph Samelson (6 September 1817 – 12 January 1888) was a German Jewish ophthalmic surgeon.

== Biography ==
Samelson was born to Jewish parents at Berlin, Germany, on 6 September 1817. He was educated at the Berlin Gymnasium, the Winterhaus, and the Berlin Friedrich-Wilhelm Gymnasium, and later at the university of Berlin, where he earned his M.D. in 1840. In the following year, he began to practice at Zehdenick in Brandenburg, where he played some part in politics as a staunch liberal, and became a member of the town council and the electoral colleges for the Prussian national assembly and the German reichstag. He was instrumental in the foundation of a friendly burial society and a co-operative loan society, and was an active contributor to ‘Die Neue Zeit,’ a local liberal newspaper which was started in 1849. For an article on the Dresden insurrection and the mode in which it was suppressed by the Prussian soldiers he was imprisoned for six months and deprived of his civil rights. After his release he resumed his professional duties at Zehdenick, but they were terminated by the withdrawal of his license to practice medicine. He afterwards went to Berlin, took up the study of diseases of the eye, and became the pupil and friend of Dr. von Graefe. The authorities eventually forced him to leave the country, and he went to Paris, with the intention of entering the medical service of the French army in the Crimea. He, however, fell ill during a cholera epidemic, and spent some time in Holland and Belgium. But he was prevented by official difficulties from following his profession there.

In the summer of 1856, he came to England and devoted himself chiefly to the study of the diseases of the eye. He took up his residence in Manchester in 1857, and from that time displayed the keenest interest in its social, sanitary, and educational progress. In 1859 the Prussian authorities restored his social status and his license to practise. His zealous public spirit and high character gained him many warm friends in Manchester, where he was one of the physicians of the Eye Hospital from 1862 to 1876, and joined in the management and support of the Schiller-Anstalt, the Sanitary Association, the Dramatic Reform Association (of which he was the treasurer and moving spirit), the Art Museum, the Provident Society, and other organisations. He was also a member of the Manchester Literary Club, and a frequent speaker at its meetings, where his knowledge of classical and modern literature and his critical acumen in discussion were much appreciated. In 1865 he went to Berlin to be treated by von Graefe for an affection of the eye called ‘granular lid,’ and afterwards published his ‘Reminiscences of a Four Months' Stay’ with that oculist, in which he gave to the English public the first account of his method of linear extraction of cataract. Samelson in 1867 translated von Graefe's essay on ‘The Study of Ophthalmology,’ and between 1860 and 1880 contributed many papers on ophthalmic science to various journals and societies.

His last years were attended by persistent insomnia, and he sought relief at Bournemouth, and then at Cannes, where he died on 12 January 1888. He was buried at the Protestant cemetery. By his will, he left the bulk of his property, valued at about 4,900l., to charitable and educational institutions.

Besides professional papers, he wrote:

- ‘The Altar at Pergamus and the Satyr from Pergamus: Papers read before the Manchester Literary Club,’ 1881.
- ‘Dwellings and the Death-rate of Manchester,’ 1883.
- ‘The Education of the Drama's Patrons,’ printed in ‘Social Science Association Transactions’ (1882) and ‘Journal of Dramatic Reform.’
