= Scott Samuelson =

American philosopher

Academic background
- Education: Emory University (PhD); Grinnell College (BA)

Academic work
- Institutions: Iowa State University, Kirkwood Community College
- Website: https://scottsamuelsonauthor.com/

Scott H. Samuelson is an American philosopher and Professor of Practice at Iowa State University, as well as a frequent teacher for the Catherine Project and the Lyceum Movement. He is the 2015 recipient of the Hiett Prize in the Humanities.

== Books ==
- To Taste: On Cooking and the Good Life (University of Chicago Press, 2026)
- Rome as a Guide to the Good Life (University of Chicago Press, 2023)
- Seven Ways of Looking at Pointless Suffering (University of Chicago Press, 2018)
- The Deepest Human Life: An Introduction to Philosophy for Everyone (University of Chicago Press, 2014)
