= William Samuels =

William or Bill Samuels may refer to:

- Bill Samuels (political activist), New York businessman and political activist
- Bill Samuels, character in The Outsider (King novel)
- William Samuels (boxer) on Template:Welsh Boxing Hall of Fame Inductees
- William "Bill" Samuels Sr., creator of Maker's Mark bourbon
