= Michael Samuels =

Michael Samuels may refer to:

- Michael Samuels (linguist) (1920–2010), British historical linguist
- Michael Samuels (director), British TV director and producer
- Michael Anthony Samuels (born 1939), American ambassador
- Michael Samuels, singer on Riverdance: Music from the Show
- Michael Samuels, a (fictional) character in the TV series House of Cards
