= Harry Finn =

British Army general (1852–1924)

Major-General Harry Finn CB DCM
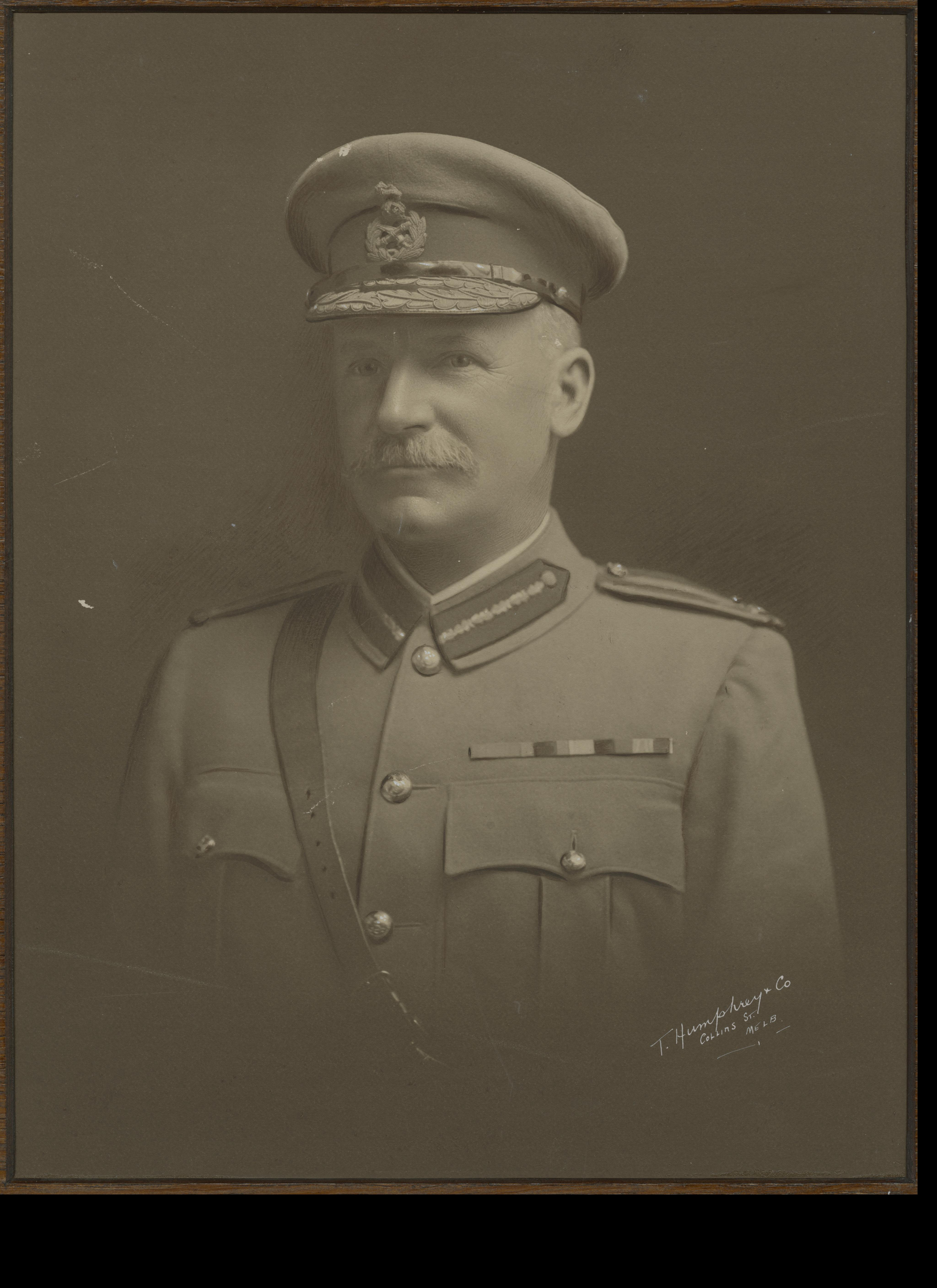
- Finn, c. 1906
- Born: 6 December 1852; Tenterden, England
- Died: 24 June 1924 (aged 71); Sydney, Australia
- Burial place: South Head Cemetery, Sydney
- Military career
- Allegiance: United Kingdom
- Branch: British Army
- Service years: 1871–1907
- Rank: Major-General
- Commands: Australian Military Forces (1904–1905); New South Wales Military District (1902–1905); Queensland Defence Force (1899–1901)
- Conflicts: Second Anglo-Afghan War; Mahdist War: Battle of Omdurman
- Awards: Companion of the Order of the Bath; Distinguished Conduct Medal; Mentioned in Despatches (2)

Major-General Henry Finn, CB, DCM (6 December 1852 – 24 June 1924) was a senior officer in the British Army who served as General Officer Commanding Australian Military Forces from 1904 to 1905.

== Military career ==
Finn joined the British Army as a private in the 9th Queen's Royal Lancers in 1871. He served in the Second Anglo-Afghan War of 1878 for which he was awarded the Distinguished Conduct Medal and mentioned in despatches. He was commissioned into the 21st Lancers in 1881 becoming Inspector of Musketry for that Regiment in 1882 and Adjutant of the Regiment in 1884.

In 1887 he was transferred to India and in 1898 he went to Sudan, fought in the Battle of Omdurman and was mentioned in despatches.

Finn was placed on half-pay from his regiment, and was promoted to the substantive rank of lieutenant-colonel on 2 March 1900. Selected for the appointment in Australia as Commandant of the Queensland Defence Force, he was granted the local rank of colonel whilst so employed from 2 March 1900. He became Commandant of the New South Wales military area in 1902. In 1904 he became General Officer Commanding Australian Military Forces and in 1905 he was made Inspector-General of the Australian Military Forces. He was a keen horseman and rode to and from his residence at Dawes Point Battery every day.

An inkwell made from the hoof of the horse Finn used in 1898 can still be seen at Victoria Barracks in Sydney.

== Family ==
In 1886, he married Catherine Scott and they went on to have two daughters and one son.

Military offices
Preceded by Major General Sir Edward Hutton	General Officer Commanding Australian Military Forces; 1904–1905	Succeeded by Major General William Bridges as Chief of the General Staff in 1909
