= Samuel (musician) =

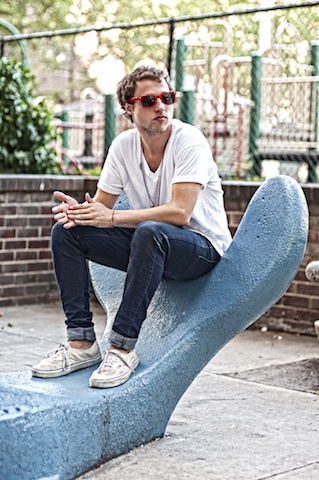

Background information
- Born: October 6, 1987 (age 38); New York City, United States
- Genres: Pop Music, Dance Music, Rhythm and blues
- Occupation: Musician
- Label: Columbia/Startime International
- Website: samuelsite.com

Samuel is an indie pop artist with R&B influences born and raised in New York City. His single "I Heart NY" was released on Columbia/Startime International Records in 2010. His full-length album titled Trains to Wanderland is set for release at the end of August 2011, with select singles being released currently.

== Biography ==
Samuel began his music career with Benjamin "B-Roc" Ruttner and James "Jpatt" Patterson of the production duo, The Knocks, recording at their label, HeavyRoc Music. The Knocks, along with Sam Sparro-producer Jesse Rogg, produced Samuel's earlier EPs and singles, including "Champagne Kisses." He signed with Columbia Records in 2008 where Grammy-nominated Greg Wells was the executive producer of the album "Trains to Wanderland." He released his single, "I Heart NY," in August 2010, which garnered major success on Vevo, from music sources such as The Guardian and Hype Machine during the week of its release. Rapper Joell Ortiz added a verse to the track post-release. He has toured with many notable artists including Jason DeRulo, OK Go!, Dan Black and Marina & The Diamonds. In summer of 2010, Samuel recorded a cover of Drake's "Find Your Love," which Kanye West, who produced the original track, featured on his blog. Spin Magazine featured Samuel as one of their "Up and Comers" to watch as did Billboard wrote a feature on him as music to "Hear This Now". On June 27, 2011, Staten Island's all children PS22 Chorus released a cover of "I Heart NY."

== Discography ==
Released by Startime International on June 8, 2010.

=== I Heart NY EP ===
I Heart NY EP
No.	Title	Length
1.	"I Heart NY"	4:15
2.	"Champagne Kisses"	3:44
3.	"Still Here"	4:05
