= Stephen Mitchell Samuels =

Stephen Mitchell Samuels (1938, Brooklyn – July 26, 2012, Indiana) was a statistician and mathematician, known for his work on the secretary problem and for the Samuels Conjecture involving a Chebyshev-type inequality for sums of independent, non-negative random variables.

After completing his undergraduate degree at Massachusetts Institute of Technology, he became a graduate student at Stanford University. There he received his Ph.D. in 1964 with a thesis supervised by Samuel Karlin. Samuels joined in 1964 the faculty of Purdue University and retired there in 2003 as professor emeritus of statistics and mathematics. He did research on various topics in probability theory and its applications, dynamic optimization, and disclosure risk assessment for statistical microdata.

== Selected publications ==
- Samuels, S. M. (1965). "On the Number of Successes in Independent Trials". The Annals of Mathematical Statistics. 36 (4): 1272–1278. doi:10.1214/aoms/1177699998. 1965
- Jogdeo, Kumar; Samuels, S. M. (1968). "Monotone Convergence of Binomial Probabilities and a Generalization of Ramanujan's Equation". The Annals of Mathematical Statistics. 39 (4): 1191–1195. doi:10.1214/aoms/1177698243. 1966
- Samuels, S. M. (1968). "Randomized Rules for the Two-Armed-Bandit with Finite Memory". The Annals of Mathematical Statistics. 39 (6): 2103–2107. doi:10.1214/aoms/1177698038. JSTOR 2239307. 1968
- Samuels, S. M. (1974). "A Characterization of the Poisson Process". Journal of Applied Probability. 11 (1): 72–85. doi:10.2307/3212584. JSTOR 3212584. 1974
- Gianini, Jacqueline; Samuels, Stephen M. (1976). "The Infinite Secretary Problem". The Annals of Probability. 4 (3): 418–432. doi:10.1214/aop/1176996090. JSTOR 2959244. 1976
- Rubin, H.; Samuels, S. M. (1977). "The Finite-Memory Secretary Problem". The Annals of Probability. 5 (4): 627–635. doi:10.1214/aop/1176995774. JSTOR 2243090. 1977
- Frank, Arthur Q.; Samuels, Stephen M. (1980). "On an optimal stopping problem of Gusein-Zade". Stochastic Processes and Their Applications. 10 (3): 299–311. doi:10.1016/0304-4149(80)90013-7. 1980
- Samuels, Stephen M.; Steele, J. Michael (1981). "Optimal Sequential Selection of a Monotone Sequence from a Random Sample". The Annals of Probability. 9 (6): 937–947. doi:10.1214/aop/1176994265. JSTOR 2243756. 1981
- Samuels, Stephen M.; Chotlos, Bay (1986). "A Multiple Criteria Optimal Selection Problem". Lecture Notes-Monograph Series. Institute of Mathematical Statistics Lecture Notes - Monograph Series. Vol. 8. pp. 62–78. doi:10.1214/lnms/1215540289. ISBN 0-940600-09-9. JSTOR 4355521. 1986
- Bruss, F. Thomas; Samuels, Stephen M. (1987). "A Unified Approach to a Class of Optimal Selection Problems with an Unknown Number of Options". The Annals of Probability. 15 (2): 824–830. doi:10.1214/aop/1176992175. JSTOR 2244078. 1987
- Samuels, Stephen M.; Studden, William J. (1989). "Bonferroni-Type Probability Bounds as an Application of the Theory of Tchebycheff Systems". Probability, Statistics, and Mathematics. pp. 271–289. doi:10.1016/B978-0-12-058470-3.50026-4. ISBN 9780120584703. 1989
- Bruss, F. Thomas; Samuels, Stephen M. (1990). "Conditions for Quasi-Stationarity of the Bayes Rule in Selection Problems with an Unknown Number of Rankable Options". The Annals of Probability. 18 (2): 877–886. doi:10.1214/aop/1176990864. hdl:2013/ULB-DIPOT:oai:dipot.ulb.ac.be:2013/199662. JSTOR 2244322. 1990
- Samuels, Stephen M. (1990). "Applications of statistics to Antarctic, non-Antarctic differences". Differences Between Antarctic and Non-Antarctic Meteorites. pp. 74–80. Bibcode:1989LPICo.712..216S.
- Samuels, Stephen M. (1992). "Secretary Problems as a Source of Benchmark Bounds". Lecture Notes-Monograph Series. Institute of Mathematical Statistics Lecture Notes - Monograph Series. Vol. 22. Institute of Mathematical Statistics. pp. 371–387. doi:10.1214/lnms/1215461963. ISBN 0-940600-29-3. JSTOR 4355753. 1992
