= Richard Samuels =

Richard Samuels may refer to:

- Richard J. Samuels (born 1951), American political scientist
- Richard L. Samuels (1926–2001), Cook County Circuit judge
- Richard R. Samuels, state legislator in Arkansas
