= Gordon Samuels =

36th Governor of New South Wales

The Honourable Gordon Samuels AC, CVO, QC

36th Governor of New South Wales
- In office 1 March 1996 – 1 March 2001
- Monarch: Elizabeth II
- Premier: Bob Carr
- Lieutenant: Murray Gleeson (1996–1998); James Spigelman (1998–2001)
- Preceded by: Peter Sinclair
- Succeeded by: Marie Bashir

Judge of the New South Wales Supreme Court
- In office 20 November 1972 – 23 March 1992

Judge of the New South Wales Court of Appeal
- In office 12 August 1974 – 23 March 1992

4th Chancellor of the University of New South Wales
- In office 1976–1994
- Preceded by: Sir Robert Webster
- Succeeded by: Sir Anthony Mason

Personal details
- Born: Gordon Jacob Samuels; 12 August 1923 London, England
- Died: 10 December 2007 (aged 84) Sydney, Australia
- Spouse: Jacqueline Kott
- Education: Balliol College, Oxford

Military service
- Allegiance: United Kingdom
- Branch/service: British Army
- Years of service: 1942–1946
- Rank: Captain
- Unit: 96th Field Regiment, Royal Artillery
- Battles/wars: Second World War

Gordon Jacob Samuels, AC, CVO, QC (12 August 1923 – 10 December 2007) was a British-Australian lawyer and judge who served as the 36th Governor of New South Wales from 1996 to 2001.

Born in London in 1923, Samuels was educated at University College School and Balliol College, Oxford. After serving in the Second World War, he was called to the bar and emigrated to Australia in 1949. Serving as a barrister in Sydney, Samuels was made a Queen's Counsel in 1964 and appointed as a Judge of the Supreme Court of New South Wales in 1972.

Samuels was later appointed a Judge of the New South Wales Court of Appeal in 1974, serving till his mandatory retirement in 1993, aged 70. A member of the University of New South Wales Council from 1969, Samuels was appointed Chancellor of the University of New South Wales in 1976, serving until 1994, being the longest-serving Chancellor. On retirement from law, Samuels became Chairman of the Law Reform Commission of New South Wales, a position he held until he was appointed governor in 1996. As Governor of New South Wales, he endured significant controversy over the decision not to reside in Government House, Sydney. Despite this he served with distinction and retired in March 2001. He died aged 84 in December 2007.

== Early life and background ==
Samuels was born on 12 August 1923 in London, England, to a family of Jewish origin. His grandfather, Jacob Samuels, left Lithuania for Edinburgh. He travelled to Australia and married Mary Michaelson, whom he had met in Edinburgh. They ran a general store in Walcha, New South Wales, where Samuels' father, Harry, was born. Harry ran a cinema in Moree before going to war in France with his brother, Lou, who won the Military Cross. Harry married Zelda Glass after the war and they settled in Cricklewood, London, where Samuels was born.

Samuels was educated at University College School and Balliol College, University of Oxford. At Oxford he was awarded the degree of a Master of Arts. When the Second World War broke out, he joined the British Army in 1942, serving in the Royal Artillery in the 96th Field Regiment (Royal Devon Yeomanry), achieving his commission as captain. Serving in Northern Ireland, India and Malaya, Samuels was demobilised in 1946.

Entering the legal profession, Samuels was called to the bar at Inner Temple in 1948. The following year he emigrated to Australia and worked as a clerk for Dawson Waldron Edwards and Nicholls (now Ashurst Australia). Called to the New South Wales bar in 1952, Samuels gained a reputation as being a "persuasive advocate and destructive cross-examiner". He married Jacqueline Kott in 1957 and had two daughters named Deborah and Selina. Between 1964 and 1970, he was the Challis Lecturer of Law in Pleading at the University of Sydney. In 1964, he was appointed Queen's Counsel for New South Wales and later for Victoria in 1965. In 1971, Samuels was elected as the President of the New South Wales Bar Association, in which capacity he served until 1972.

== Judicial and academic career ==
In 1972, Samuels was appointed a Judge of the Supreme Court of New South Wales, being elevated to the Court of Appeal in 1974. As a Judge of Appeal until 1992, and as an Acting Judge afterwards until 1993, he participated in many of the leading decisions of that court. On Samuels time as a Judge, Justice Michael Kirby commented: "His talents as an appellate judge shone brightly. No judge was more gifted in delivering accurate and elegant ex-tempore reasons immediately following argument. He displayed a command of facts and law and the well-furnished mind that he brought to the resolution of every judicial problem."

While a Judge of Appeal, Samuels performed many other public functions. These included as President of the Australian Academy of Forensic Sciences (1974–1976), President of the Australian Society of Legal Philosophy (1976–1979), President of the Commonwealth Security Appeals Tribunal (1989–1990), Chairman of the Australian Legal Education Council (1981–1985), and Presiding Member of the Advisory Committee on the Educational Needs of Overseas Trained Doctors and of the NSW Migrant Employment and Qualifications Board (1992–1995).

A member of the University of New South Wales Council from 1969, Samuels was appointed Chancellor of the University of New South Wales in 1976. In this time he was involved in the establishment of the UNSW foundation, became a life member of the UNSW Sports Association, was the inaugural presiding member of the Australia Ensemble and became patron of the UNSW Alumni Association. On 8 June 1987, Samuels was made a Companion of the Order of Australia (AC) for "service to learning, to the community and to law".

In 1992 the "Samuels Building" was opened on the UNSW Kensington campus. This new research building was named in his and his wife's honour in recognition of their services to the university since 1976. When he retired from this position in 1994, he was awarded the degree of Doctor of Science, honoris causa, by the university. His wife, Mrs Samuels, was awarded the degree of Doctor of the University, honoris causa. On turning 70 in 1993, the age of mandatory judicial retirement, Samuels retired from the bench and became Chairman of the Law Reform Commission of New South Wales, a position he held until he was appointed governor in 1996.

== Governor of New South Wales ==
The appointment of Samuels as Governor of New South Wales in 1996 was followed by some controversy, not because of any doubt about his qualifications, but because of the accompanying announcement by the Premier of New South Wales, Bob Carr. On 16 January 1996 Carr announced that the next Governor would be Samuels, that he would not live or work at Government House, Sydney and that he would retain his appointment as Chairman of the New South Wales Law Reform Commission. On these changes, Carr said: "The Office of the Governor should be less associated with pomp and ceremony, less encumbered by anachronistic protocol, more in tune with the character of the people." This decision was seen by conservatives as an attempt by Carr, a republican, to downgrade the importance of the office of governor.

On this announcement, The Sydney Morning Herald, in its Editorial column, noted that: "There is an inconsistency in saying that the Office of the Governor should be 'more in tune with the character of the people' while reviewing, presumably with a view to cutting back, the number of ceremonial and social functions the Governor performs. If Mr Samuels withdraws, or is forced to withdraw, from such apparently mundane matters as opening country shows, or being patron of community organisations, it can hardly be said that he is bringing the office closer to the people." In further response to Carr's decision the group Australians for Constitutional Monarchy organised a protest that saw a crowd of 15,000 protested outside Parliament House, Sydney, blocking Macquarie Street. On the day before Samuels' swearing-in, a petition bearing 55,000 signatures was handed in, calling on the Premier to reconsider.

Nevertheless, despite this turbulent beginning in office, particularly in terms of a change in role, Samuels was able to continue many of the traditions of office and served with dignity and distinction until his retirement in March 2001. On 21 March 2000 the Queen appointed him a Commander of the Royal Victorian Order (CVO). Before his departure from office, the Opposition Leader, Kerry Chikarovski, noted that while there was controversy over Government House at the start of his term: "There was a great deal of feeling about the issue and among some people that feeling remains. But it was never reflected personally on the Hon. Gordon Samuels. It was reflected against the Government at the time but it was never a reflection on the Governor. Gordon Samuels carried out his duties as the Governor very effectively." Chikarovski was also quoted as saying "As time went on it became perfectly clear that the Governor was going to devote all of his time, and his wife all of her time, to the job, which they intended to perform in pretty much the usual way, including the pomp and ceremony of formal openings of Parliament."

== Later life ==
Samuels remained active after his governorship, inquiring into activities of the Australian Secret Intelligence Organisation and allegations that "loose talk" by diplomatic staff had led to the exposure of agent Warren Reed. In 2002, Samuels attacked Prime Minister John Howard's response to Senator Bill Heffernan's "vicious attack" on Justice Michael Kirby, using a false document as evidence: "It is incredible that the Prime Minister, if he was indeed opposed to Heffernan's intention, did not ask for the evidence upon which the senator relied. What was in contemplation was an attack of the gravest kind upon the fitness of a High Court judge. Would not the Prime Minister have asked his friend of whom he speaks in affectionate terms to show him the material which justified so serious a course?"

Samuels also resumed his activities in the Law Reform Commission, serving as a Part-time commissioner from 2001 to 2007. He died of a cancer-related illness on 10 December 2007, survived by his wife, Jacqueline, their two daughters, Deborah and Selina Samuels and his grandchildren Rebecca and Samuel. Samuels requested not to be given a state funeral.

== Honours ==
Viceregal styles of Gordon Samuels
- Reference style: His Excellency
- Spoken style: Your Excellency

Companion of the Order of Australia (AC)	1987
Commander of the Royal Victorian Order (CVO)	2000
Knight of Justice of the Venerable Order of St John of Jerusalem (KStJ)	1996
Defence Medal	
War Medal 1939–1945	
Queen Elizabeth II Silver Jubilee Medal	1977

=== Honorary degrees ===
- (New South Wales) In 1994, he was appointed a Doctor of Laws (honoris causa) by the University of Sydney.
- In 1994, he was awarded the degree of Doctor of Science (honoris causa) by the University of New South Wales.

Professional and academic associations
Preceded by Philip Woodward	President of the New South Wales Bar Association; 1971–1972	Succeeded by George Denys Needham
Academic offices
Preceded by Sir Robert Webster	Chancellor of the University of New South Wales; 1976–1994	Succeeded by Sir Anthony Mason
Legal offices
Preceded by Robert Marsden Hope	Chairman of the Law Reform Commission of New South Wales; 1993–1996	Succeeded by Michael Adams
Government offices
Preceded by Peter Sinclair	Governor of New South Wales; 1996–2001	Succeeded by Dame Marie Bashir
