= Howard C. Samuels =

American psychologist

Howard Christie Samuels
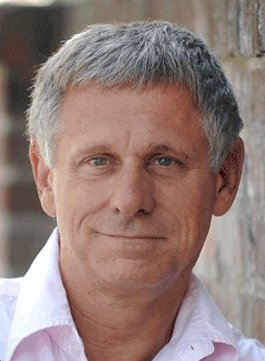
- Born: March 29, 1952 (age 74); New York City, US
- Education: Ryokan College, Antioch University Masters Program
- Occupation: Addiction Therapist

Howard Christie Samuels (born March 29, 1952) is a licensed therapist who founded and was formerly the CEO of The Hills Treatment Center, a substance abuse treatment facility, in Los Angeles. He holds a Doctorate in Clinical Psychology and is a Marriage and Family Therapist, specializing in addiction. He is also a vocal opponent of the legalization of marijuana.

== Early life ==
Samuels was born in New York City, New York. He is the second son of Howard J. Samuels, the noted political figure and co-founder of the Kordite Corporation.

Samuels struggled with drug and alcohol abuse during his youth. Given that his father was an influential politician, Samuels' drug-related arrests received major media exposure on the front pages of both the New York Post and New York Daily News. His court cases were covered in Rolling Stone magazine and Newsweek.

At age 17, Samuels was arrested for the first time on November 2, 1969, and charged with a Class A Misdemeanor for drug possession. Being a minor, he received court-ordered counseling at the county’s Youth Counsel Bureau. However, two years later, according to the New York Times, "Howard C. Samuels was arrested at Kennedy International Airport on October of 1971 with 10 bags of heroin in his possession."

A judge allowed Samuels to choose between incarceration for his crimes or enrollment into a substance abuse treatment facility. Samuels chose the latter.

However, Samuels continued to abuse drugs and alcohol. In 1984, he was committed to his last substance abuse treatment center, The Phoenix House in New York. After spending a year there, he began to study to be a substance abuse counselor. Eventually he got a job working at the Phoenix House's branch in New York.

== Training and education ==
While studying to become a counselor in 1990, Samuels worked at the Promises Treatment Center in West Los Angeles, California, as a counselor. He later became the facility's program director. Additionally, he assisted in developing another branch of the facility in Malibu.

Samuels received a Doctorate in Clinical Psychology from Antioch University in 1996. Two years later, he became a Marriage and Family Therapist (MFT), specializing in addiction, having studied at Ryokan College.

== Current activities ==
Samuels provides counseling and therapy to individual clients in his private practice, and continues to run therapy groups. He also appears in the media regarding addiction-related issues.

As a strong opponent of the legalization of marijuana in the United States, Samuels also sits on the executive board for Project SAM (Smart Approaches to Marijuana), founded by Patrick Kennedy and Kevin Sabet.

== Media appearances ==
Samuels has been featured on various media programs to discuss addiction-related issues. He has appeared on programs including Fox News with Piers Morgan, the CBS Early Show, Larry King Live, ABC's Good Morning America, and the Today Show on NBC. He appears regularly as an addiction specialist on CNN with Jane Velez Mitchell.

Samuels was called to testify before the California Senate Public Safety Commission regarding legislation prohibiting the sale of the hallucinogenic drug Salvia to minors. The legislation passed.
