= List of judges of the Vice Admiralty Court (New South Wales) =

Judges who have served on the Vice Admiralty Court in New South Wales between 1787 and 1911 include :

- Judges
- Deputy judges
- Surrogate judges.

Position	Name	Appointment commenced	Appointment ended	Term in office	Comments	Notes
Judge Commissary	Robert Ross	18 April 1787				
Judge Commissary	Francis Grose					
Judge Commissary	Joseph Foveaux	7 August 1798	7 August 1798		Appointment refused	
Judge Commissary	Henry Waterhouse	15 August 1798				
Judge Commissary	William Paterson	20 March 1799				
Judge Commissary	George Johnston	20 November 1804				
Judge Commissary	Edward Abbott	19 February 1808				
Judge Commissary	Ellis Bent	10 August 1811	10 November 1815	4 years, 92 days		
Judge Commissary	John Wylde	26 July 1816				
Judge Commissary	Sir Francis Forbes	31 October 1825	1 July 1837	11 years, 243 days	Chief Justice of New South Wales (1823−1837)	
Judge Commissary	John Kinchela	7 May 1840				
Judge Commissary	Sir James Dowling	18 August 1841	27 September 1844	3 years, 40 days	Chief Justice of New South Wales (1837−1844)	
Judge Commissary	Sir Alfred Stephen (Note: The Stephen family is a prominent legal dynasty in Australia. Sir Alfred Stephen was the father of (Matthew) Henry Stephen.)	7 October 1844	5 November 1873	29 years, 29 days	Chief Justice of New South Wales (1844−1873)	
Judge Commissary	Sir James Martin	19 November 1873	4 November 1886	12 years, 350 days	Chief Justice of New South Wales (1873−1886)	
Judge Commissary	Sir Frederick Darley	29 November 1886	4 January 1910	23 years, 36 days	Chief Justice of New South Wales (1886-1910)	
Judge Commissary	Sir William Cullen	28 January 1910	1 July 1911	1 year, 154 days	Chief Justice of New South Wales (1910-1925)	
Deputy Commissary	Ellis Bent	25 June 1810				
Deputy Commissary	John Kinchela	September 1837	November 1840	3 years, 32–90 days	Acting judge of the Supreme Court (1836−1837)	
Deputy Commissary	Samuel Milford	1 August 1844	26 May 1865	20 years, 298 days	Master in Equity (Supreme Court) (1843−1855)	
Deputy Commissary	Alfred Cheeke	10 September 1869			Judge of the Supreme Court (1865−1876)	
Deputy Commissary	Peter Faucett	10 September 1869	15 September 1879	10 years, 5 days	Judge of the Supreme Court (1865−1888)	
Deputy Commissary	Sir William Windeyer	15 September 1879			Acting judge & judge of the Supreme Court (1879−1896)	
Deputy Commissary	Sir William Owen	24 September 1897			Judge of the Supreme Court (1887−1908)	
Deputy Commissary	Philip Street	29 July 1908			Judge of the Supreme Court (1907−1934)	
Surrogate Judge	William à Beckett	15 September 1841			Solicitor General (1841−1844)	
Surrogate Judge	Samuel Milford	3 March 1843			Master in Equity (Supreme Court) (1843−1855)	
Surrogate Judge	William Carter	22 February 1847			Master in Equity (Supreme Court) (1841−1843)	
Surrogate Judge	Herman Milford					
Surrogate Judge	Henry Stephen	21 December 1857				
Surrogate Judge	William Cary	11 January 1858				
Surrogate Judge	William Hallam Wilkinson	6 August 1864			Deputy Judge District Court (1868–1870, 1874)	
Surrogate Judge	Joseph Innes	1872			Solicitor General (1872−1873)	
