= Vice Admiralty Court (New South Wales) =

Historical prerogative court in New South Wales, Australia

The Vice Admiralty Court was a prerogative court established in the late 18th century in the colony of New South Wales, which was to become a state of Australia. A vice admiralty court is in effect an admiralty court. The word "vice" in the name of the court denoted that the court represented the Lord Admiral of the United Kingdom. In English legal theory, the Lord Admiral, as vice-regal of the monarch, was the only person who had authority over matters relating to the sea. The Lord Admiral would authorize others as his deputies or surrogates to act. Generally, he would appoint a person as a judge to sit in the Court as his surrogate. By appointing Vice-Admirals in the colonies, and by constituting courts as Vice-Admiralty Courts, the terminology recognized that the existence and superiority of the "mother" court in the United Kingdom. Thus, the "vice" tag denoted that whilst it was a separate court, it was not equal to the "mother" court. In the case of the New South Wales court, a right of appeal lay back to the British Admiralty Court, which further reinforced this superiority. In all respects, the court was an Imperial court rather than a local Colonial court.

The function of an admiralty court initially in the 14th century was to deal with piracy and other offenses committed upon the high seas. This was a manifestation of England's claim over the sovereignty of the seas claimed by her. However, it did not take long for those early courts to seek to manifest control over all things to do with shipping, such as mercantile matters. This led to a running battle between the admiralty courts and the common law courts as to which court had jurisdiction over particular issues. At times King Richard II and King James I were induced to arbitrate a solution to these disputes. Admiralty courts were run under the Roman civil law of the time, whereas the common law courts were run under the common law procedures. Litigants would prefer the simplicity of the admiralty courts over the complexities of the common law courts.

== Establishment ==
The court in New South Wales was established by letters patent dated 2 April 1787 issued by the reigning monarch of England, King George III. These letters authorized the Lords Commissioners of the Admiralty to constitute and appoint a Vice Admiral for the colony, as well as a Judge and any other officers needed for the court to function in the new colony that was soon to be established. The Admirals had authority to appoint vice-admirals and judges in any existing colony. However, as the colony of New South Wales was not yet established, the Admiralty obtained additional letters patent to ensure that there was no legal defect in the constitution of the court. Those further letters patent authorized the Admiralty to make appointments in the new colony.

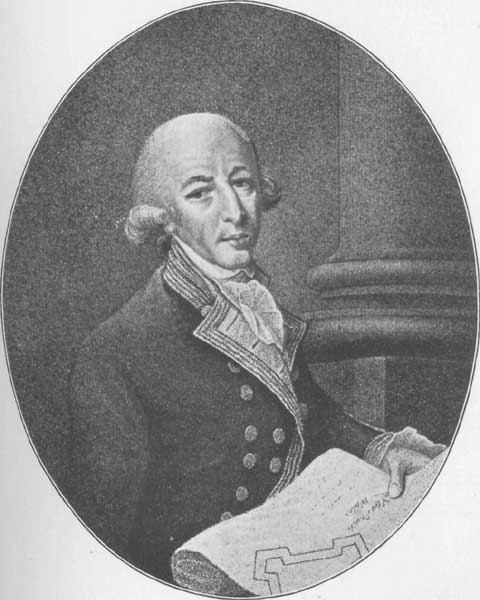
Arthur Phillip, first Vice-Admiral of New South Wales

On 30 April 1787, the High Court of Admiralty issued those letters patent which appointed the first Governor of New South Wales Arthur Phillip as Vice Admiral. Further letters patent were also issued to Robert Ross who was appointed as the first judge of the court. Their commissions gave them power to deal with all civil and maritime causes according to the maritime laws and customs which prevailed in what used to be called the High Court of Admiralty in the United Kingdom. At the time of establishment, this included commercial disputes involving ships, seamen's wages, collisions, and salvage. This is what is commonly called an Admiralty Court's "Instance Jurisdiction".

Whilst the British admiralty court had jurisdiction over criminal offenses committed upon the high seas, the jurisdiction of the court was rarely invoked. The civil law was well suited to dealing with commercial transactions. However, it could not cope adequately with criminal offenses. The court needed to rely upon the old Roman civil law to establish any breaches. Former Chief Justice Frederick Jordan noted that criminal cases often fell through because sailors weren't available to give evidence (whether by malice or design). A sentence of death could only not be imposed unless two witnesses could be produced. To deal with this problem, the British Parliament passed the Piracy Act 1698 (UK). This enabled the Crown to appoint seven commissioners to try offenses of piracy under that Act. Whilst that latter court was often called a vice-admiralty court, Australian legal historian John Bennett has shown that that court should not be confused with the present court. The latter court was legally distinct as it was constituted under a separate letters patent dated 12 May 1787 as the Court of Vice-Admiralty and it was constituted by commissioners rather than a judge.

The court sat as a Prize Court, although Bennett points out that there are no records of a prize commission being granted. The first sitting in Prize was in May 1799 when Captain Henry Waterhouse RN ordered the Spanish vessel Nostra Senora de Bethlehem condemned as a prize of war. Other Spanish vessels condemned during this time were the El Plumier, Euphemia and the Anna Josepha

In 1810 Judge Advocate Ellis Bent questioned the jurisdiction of the court to consider proceedings in prize. As a result, the Admiralty issued warrants and documents to Bent in June 1812 to authorize the court to consider prize, but subsequently revoked Bent's authority in October 1813. As a result, The Eringapatam was unable to be dealt with in New South Wales in 1814 when it was brought into port.

== Work of the court before 1840 ==
The first sitting of the court purported to be in 1798 when Governor Hunter convened the latter court to deal with charges of mutiny and attempted piracy. As Bennett has shown, whilst the court was convened as a vice-admiralty court, it was in fact the Court of Vice-Admiralty. No harm was done as the defendant was acquitted on the basis of insufficient evidence.

The majority of the work of the court was administrative in nature. Archive records from the court indicate that this related to the granting and revoking of letters of marque and the provision of sureties by masters or shipowners. After the death of Ellis Bent, deputy judge advocate of the colony and also judge of this court, his brother Jeffery Hart Bent, offered to serve as judge. Jeffery Bent was the judge of the Supreme Court of Civil Judicature. His offer was declined by Governor Hunter and he was never commissioned. However, when he left New South Wales after his appointment as judge of the Supreme Court was revoked, he took the Admiralty court seal entrusted to his brother Ellis with him back to the United Kingdom. Castles says that the removal of the seal was to cause litigants in the court to bitterly remember Bent. This was because that documents from the court could not be sealed until a new seal arrived from the United Kingdom, frustrating litigation in the court.

In 1823, the Third Charter of Justice created a new Supreme Court of New South Wales. That court was to be presided over by Chief Justice of New South Wales Francis Forbes. However, the British authorities did not transfer the admiralty jurisdiction of the vice admiralty court to that new court. Until 1911, this court and the new Supreme Court operated side by side. In some cases, both courts had concurrent jurisdiction, such as over criminal offenses committed upon the high seas. However, in practice, criminal cases were brought in the Supreme Court probably because of the difficulty in finding seven commissioners to sit. In practice, the senior judge of the Supreme Court was also appointed as a judge of the vice-admiralty court. This could cause problems as when the judge was unavailable through leave or absence, there was a belief that no other person who could perform the role. For example, in the case of the Almorah, the Attorney General of New South Wales Saxe Bannister thought that there was no actual admiralty court as Forbes did not hold an actual commission from the United Kingdom as a judge in Admiralty. Bannister advised that the case should be tried in Calcutta, India.

In 1841, the Admiralty in England decreed that the chief justice should be the judge in admiralty. This changed the previous practice of directing appointing a person to be judge. However, under Chief Justice Alfred Stephen, the vice-admiralty commission was given to Justice Samuel Milford instead. Milford regularly sat in the court at least one day a week. However, when Milford was appointed the Resident Judge at Moreton Bay (being the precursor of the Supreme Court of Queensland, Stephen offered to resign his commission as judge in vice-admiralty. The British authorities declined that request and advised that if Stephen was to resign his admiralty commission, by necessity, he would have to resign his commission as chief justice of the Supreme Court.

== Work of the court after 1840 ==
The jurisdiction of the British court of admiralty was extended in both 1840 and in 1861 by the Admiralty Court Acts of 1840 and 1861. That increase in jurisdiction did not flow down to the New South Wales court. The British Parliament passed the Vice Admiralty Courts Act 1863 (26 & 27 Vict. c. 24 (UK)) to confirm the colonial jurisdiction of the courts as well as giving them jurisdiction over ships mortgages, disputes over ownership or possession of ships, employment, the earnings of any registered ship, claims for master's wages, towage and building or repairing ships. The Act provided for an appeal to the Privy Council and also allowed the judge of the court to appoint a registrar or marshal locally, rather than wait on an appointment from the United Kingdom. However, these changes did not make the court a local court, and the court was still an Imperial Court of the United Kingdom.

In 1868, the Victorian registered schooner Daphne chartered by Ross Lewin and skippered by John Daggett recruited islanders from the islands of Tanna, Erromango, Efate, Loyalty and Banks as indentured labour for employment on Queensland sugarcane fields. This was under Queensland's Polynesian Labourers Act. That Act required a ship to have a license to undertake that work. The license required the vessel to uphold certain minimum conditions as to the state and fitness of the vessel to carry labourers. The license for the Daphne was for a maximum of 58 labourers that could be conveyed to Queensland on each voyage.

At this some point during a second voyage to Queensland, it was decided to sail to the island of Fiji where the recruiters could obtain six pounds Sterling for each of the 108 islanders, rather than nine pounds Sterling for the 58 islanders which they were permitted to carry to Queensland. The licence was in Lewin's name but he remained on the island of Tanna. The Daphne sailed on to Levuka where it was intercepted by HMS Rosario on patrol from Sydney. The ship's captain George Palmer suspected that the Daphne was a slaver ship, detained it, and conveyed it to Sydney.

Palmer brought proceedings in the court to have the Daphne condemned under the British slave trade laws. An earlier magistrate's committal hearing for the crime of piracy was dismissed. The case was heard by Sir Alfred Stephen, who was the Chief Justice of New South Wales, and held the appointment of judge commissary in the Vice-Admiralty Court. Stephen dismissed the case on 24 September on the basis that the British Slave Trade Act 1839 did not apply to the South Pacific Ocean

== 1890 ==
1890 saw the enactment of the Colonial Courts of Admiralty Act 1890 (Imp). That Act provided for the abolition of the Imperial Courts of Admiralty and replace them with local courts to be called Colonial Courts of Admiralty. It was widely considered unsatisfactory that the Imperial court should exist separately to the colonial courts, yet use the same facilities and personnel of the colonial courts. Every superior court not named in that Act would become a Colonial Court of Admiralty automatically. The Act commenced operation on 1 July 1891, but it did not apply to either this Court or the Victorian equivalent, as the Act named those courts as exclusions. This was apparently due to local concerns. The act was to fix the court's jurisdiction as at 1891. This Act was to remain the main source of jurisdiction for Australian Courts to act under for Admiralty work until the passing of the Admiralty Act 1988 (Cth).

In 1899 the court heard the case of the Glencairn. In this case, the Glencairn was being towed to Newcastle, New South Wales during a gale and heavy seas. The tugboat which was towing it lost its towline to the Glencairn. Another tugboat belonging to another owner rescued it and brought her in safely. The presiding judge awarded the owners £125 for the rescue, £100 to the master of the boat for his promptitude and skill, and £75 to the crew to be divided equally amongst them.

== Appeals ==
There was a right of appeal to the High Court of Admiralty in England. This was in contrast to the earliest civil courts in New South Wales, being the Court of Civil Jurisdiction, the Governors Court and the Supreme Court of Civil Judicature. Each of those courts either had no right of appeal, or instead, had a right of appeal to the Governor sitting as a Court of Appeal.

== Abolition ==
The court was abolished when the court's jurisdiction was finally given to the Supreme Court of New South Wales on 4 May 1911 through an order made by the British Privy Council. This order was made under the previous Colonial Courts of Admiralty Act 1890 (UK). From that time on, the Supreme Court was the Colonial Court of Admiralty and exercised the jurisdiction of that court.

== See also ==
- List of judges of the Vice Admiralty Court (New South Wales)

== Sources ==
- Jordan, Frederick (1983). Select legal papers. On equity in New South Wales, administration of the estates of deceased persons, general principles of the administration of justice, and the Admiralty jurisdiction in New South Wales. Sydney, Australia: Legal Books. ISBN 0949553050.
- Bennett, John Michael (1974). "Chapter 10 Admiralty Jurisdiction". A history of the Supreme Court of New South Wales. Sydney: Law Book Co Ltd. ISBN 0-455-19240-5.
- Windeyer, Victor (1957). Lectures on legal history (2nd ed.). Sydney, Australia: Law Book Co. ISBN 9780455142401.
- New South Wales State Archive Authority, State Archive Guide.
- Castles, Alex (1982). An Australian Legal History. Sydney: Law Book Co. ISBN 9780455196091.
- Ying, C A, Colonial and Federal Admiralty Jurisdiction (1981) 12 Federal Law Review 241.
