= Judicial commission =

Judicial commission may refer to:

- Letters patent, a document signifying the appointment of a government official
- Judicial Commission of Indonesia
- Judicial Commission of New South Wales, Australia
- Judicial Commission of Pakistan
- Judicial commission, an investigative body under the supervision of a judge

== See also ==
- Judicial commissioner
