= Fox v Percy =

High Court of Australia

- Court: High Court of Australia
- Full case name: Fox v Percy
- Decided: 2003
- Citation: 214 CLR 118

Court membership
- Judges sitting: Gleeson CJ, McHugh, Gummow, Kirby & Callinan JJ

Case opinions
- appeal dismissed Gleeson CJ, Gummow & Kirby JJ; McHugh J Callinan J

Fox v Percy is a decision of the High Court of Australia.

The case is important to appellate law in Australia. The court made notable observations about the role of; appellate courts, trial judge findings, and assessments of witness demeanor.

Fox v Percy is the 15th most cited High Court case according to LawCite.

== Facts ==
=== Background facts ===
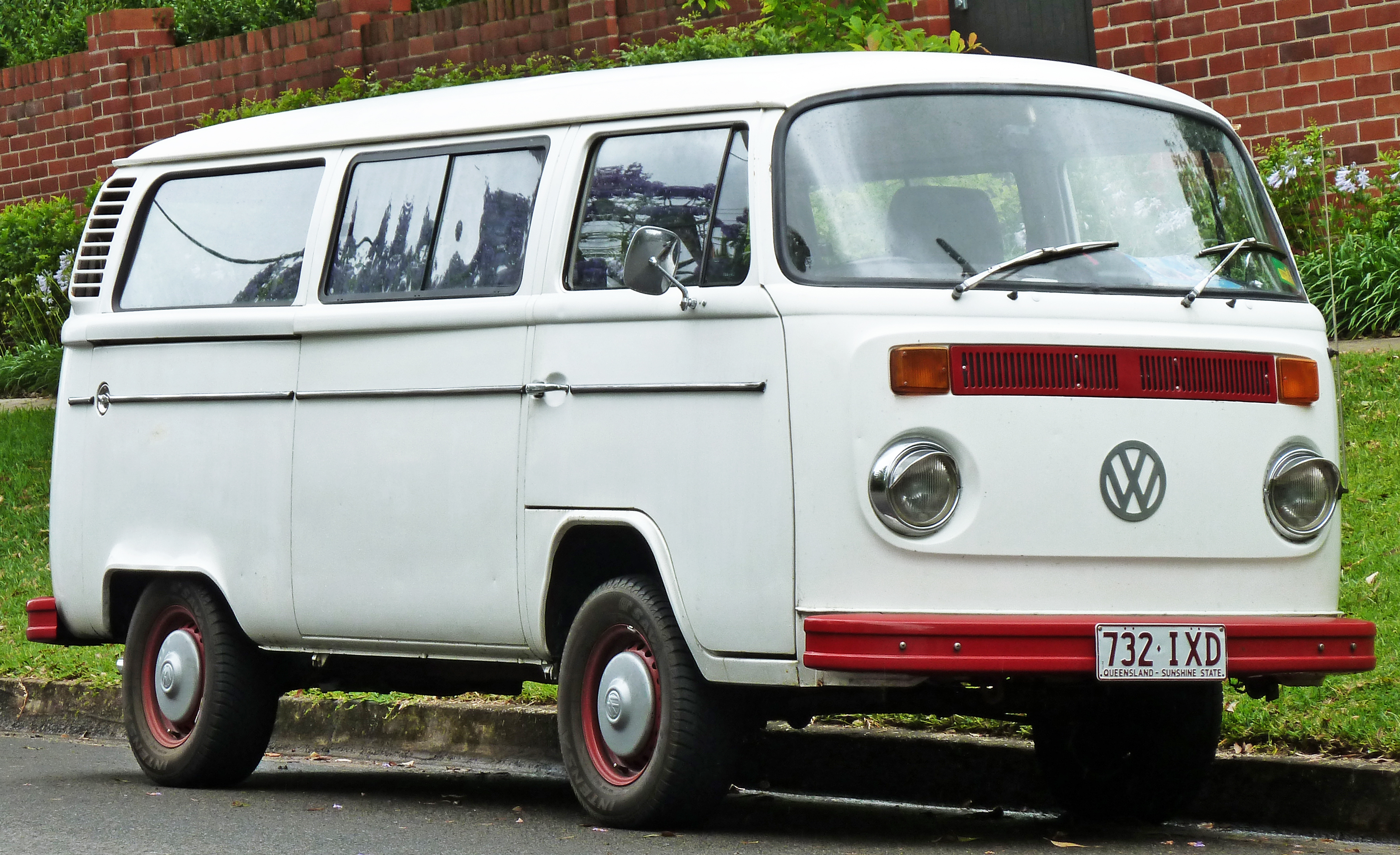
(pictured) The type of vehicle Percy had been driving at the time of collision, a 'Kombi Van'

The appellant Barbara Fox was injured in 1992. She was riding a horse alongside her friend Mr Murdoch, and came into collision with a Kombi Van driven by Megan Percy. Fox claimed damages against Percy in negligence. At trial, the crucial dispute was whether the respondent's motor vehicle was on the correct side of the road at time of impact. Both gave evidence claiming to be on the correct side of the road.

Soon after the collision, an ambulance and police arrived at the scene. The ambulance attendants claimed at trial that when they arrived, the Kombi Van was on its correct side of the road. The police officer recorded in a sketch also that the vehicle was on the correct side, and that there were skid marks 10 meters behind it. The officer testified that those skid marks suggested to him 'that the vehicle had at all material times ... been on its correct side of the road'. Fox had a blood alcohol reading of 0.122 when a measurement was taken by ambulance staff.

==== Primary judicial findings ====
The primary judge, Herron DCJ had to resolve the conflict in testimony between the parties. He accepted the police record, and in particular, the officer's evidence about skid marks being present behind the vehicle. Despite accepting this account; the judge found that the defendant was on the wrong side of the road at the time of collision. He made these findings while relying on the appellant's testimony; confirmatory testimony provided by Mr Murdoch; and evidence contained within an expert report prepared by Mr John Tindall, a traffic engineer.

Percy sought review at the NSW Court of Appeal.

==== Court of Appeal ====
The judges divided on appeal. In dissent, Fitzgerald JA criticized the growing practice of using experts to resolve simple trial functions; but wrote that rational minds could reasonably differ in this instance. He acknowledged the apparent legal constraints upon appellate courts while interfering with a trial judge's factual conclusions. He noted in particular the primacy to be given to a trial judge in 'assessment of credibility and reliability of witnesses'. He rejected an argument that the trial had not been properly concluded.

The majority opinion, written by Beazley JA; acknowledged the advantages which the primary judge had in making findings in Fox's favour. Nevertheless, she decided that the evidence of the police officer concerning the skid marks on the respondent's correct side of the road were facts 'incontrovertibly established by the evidence'. As the primary judge had accepted the testimony about the skid marks, she concluded that the oral evidence of Fox and Mr Murdoch did not suffice to sustain the final opinion of the primary judge. She drew attention to defects in the reports of the expert witness Mr Tindall, including a lack of proved evidence to sustain some of his assumptions; and that he had not been called to give oral evidence. The court therefore found for Percy.

Fox then appealed to the High Court.

== Judgment ==
The High Court decided unanimously for the respondent, Percy. The majority judgment discussed at length legal principles behind the appeal process; comments which have been cited many times since.

=== Gleeson CJ, Gummow & Kirby JJ ===
==== Statement of appeal principles ====
The majority judgement began by briefly discussing the nature of judicial appeals as statutory. They mentioned four types of appeal discussed in prior case law. They noted the meaning of the word 'rehearing' in the Supreme Court Act (NSW) as being; a proceeding on the basis of the record, with fresh evidence only to be admitted exceptionally. Further describing this generic type of appeal, the court said of its requirements:

'On the one hand, the appellate court is obliged to "give the judgment which in its opinion ought to have been given in the first instance". On the other, it must, of necessity, observe the "natural limitations" that exist in the case of any appellate court proceeding wholly or substantially on the record. These limitations include the disadvantage that the appellate court has when compared with the trial judge in respect of the evaluation of witnesses' credibility and of the "feeling" of a case which an appellate court, reading the transcript, cannot always fully share. Furthermore, the appellate court does not typically get taken to, or read, all of the evidence taken at the trial. Commonly, the trial judge therefore has advantages that derive from the obligation at trial to receive and consider the entirety of the evidence and the opportunity, normally over a longer interval, to reflect upon that evidence and to draw conclusions from it, viewed as a whole.'

They said that appellate courts must 'conduct a real review of the trial'. While allowances must be made for not having directly seen a witness; an appellate court is still required to 'weigh conflicting evidence and draw ... inferences'.

Of the dichotomy between appellate obligations and appellate restraint, the court said: "the mere fact that a trial judge necessarily reached a conclusion favoring the witnesses of one party over those of another does not, and cannot, prevent the performance by a court of appeal of the functions imposed on it by statute". 'Incontrovertible facts' or uncontested testimony might demonstrate a trial judge's conclusions are erroneous, even when those conclusions are based on credibility findings. Additionally, in some 'quite rare' instances the court noted, an appellate conclusion may be reached that the decision at trial was 'glaringly improbable', despite an absence of facts meeting the 'incontrovertible' threshold. In such an instance, the High Court instructed that an appellate court must 'not shrink from giving effect to' its own conclusion.

One more noteworthy observation made by the court, was its comment on scientific research regarding assessments of witness credibility made by judges. They noted that such studies had cast doubt on the ability of judges to tell truth or falsehood accurately on the basis of courtroom testimony. While not eliminating the principles behind the primary role trial judges have in making credibility findings, the court noted this research might 'tend to reduce the occasions where those principles are seen as critical'.

==== Application of principle to the case ====
The court noted that Fox's case relied upon the advantages that the primary judge enjoyed in seeing the parties give their evidence. It noted that the Court of Appeal had given due allowance to the trial judge's advantage. Still, the High Court found that the Court of Appeal did not make an error in overruling the trial judge; 'as the skid marks on the respondent's correct side of the road were incontrovertibly established'.

== Significance ==
Fox v Percy is frequently cited by judges whilst discussing the legal principles which inform appeals. Although the case was a civil dispute, its principles are understood to have (somewhat qualified) relevance in a criminal appeal context. The proper role of trial judges in making credibility findings is a matter of debate among jurists and scholars.

The majority's comments about the weaknesses judges face in making demeanor based findings, were tacitly endorsed by the Kiefel Court in Pell v R. Interestingly, in Pell, the intermediate appellate justices had decided to watch the witness testimony directly; and made their own credibility findings de novo. The High Court remarked negatively upon the CoA's decision to watch the videos in this way. They held in their unanimous acquittal of Cardinal Pell that 'the Court of Appeal ... acted too much like jurors'.

The case is the 15th most cited High Court case of all time. Many of its citations are found in appeals of Magistrate court decisions.
