= Frederick Jordan =

Australian judge

The Honourable Sir Frederick Richard Jordan KCMG KC
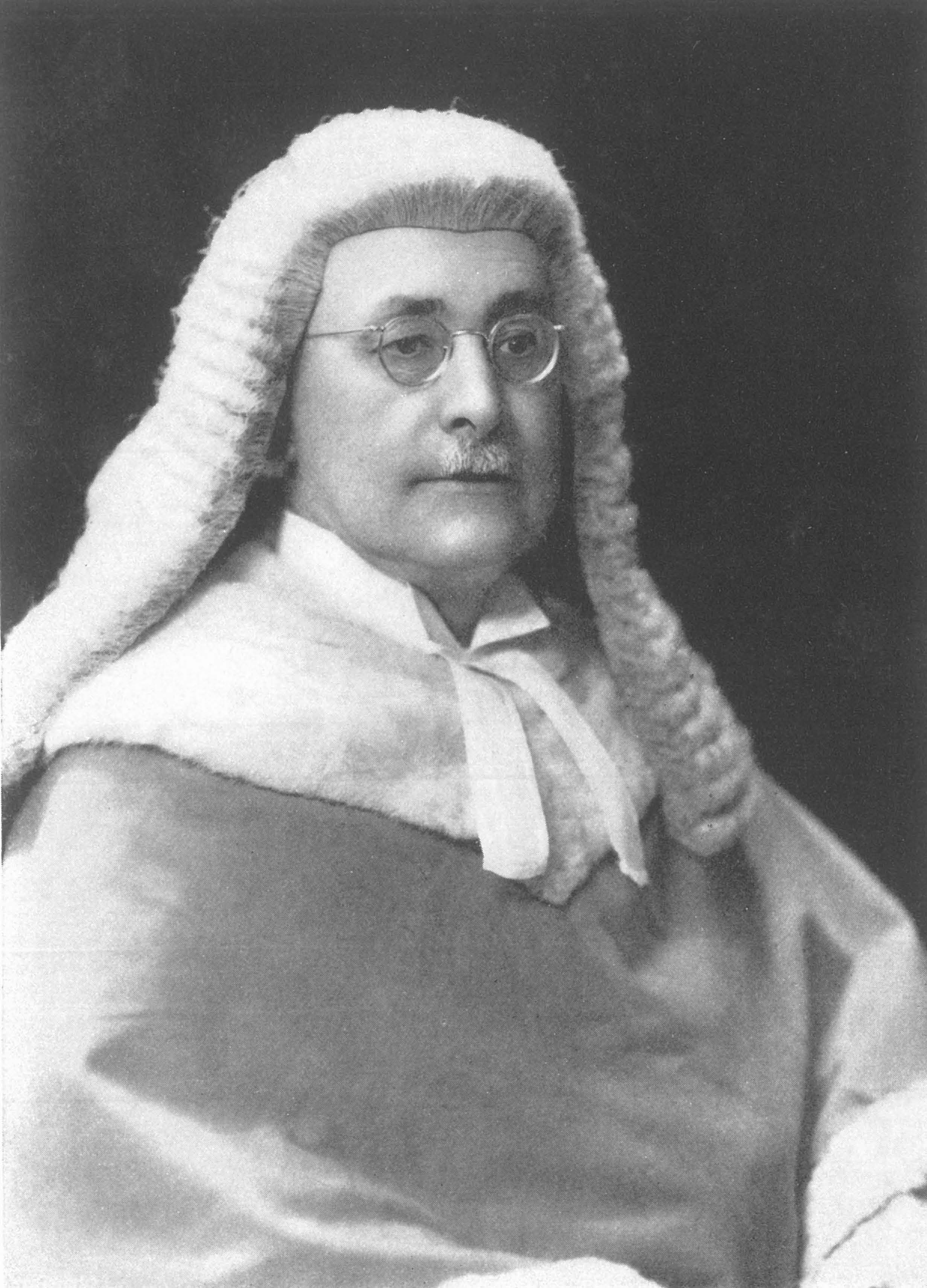

9th Chief Justice of New South Wales
- In office 1 February 1934 – 4 November 1949
- Appointed by: Sir Dudley de Chair
- Preceded by: Sir Philip Street
- Succeeded by: Sir Kenneth Street

Lieutenant-Governor of New South Wales
- In office 17 October 1938 – 4 November 1949
- Appointed by: George VI
- Preceded by: Sir Philip Street
- Succeeded by: Sir Kenneth Street

Personal details
- Born: 13 October 1881 London, England
- Died: 4 November 1949 (aged 68) Vaucluse, New South Wales, Australia

Sir Frederick Richard Jordan KCMG KC (1881–1949) was an Australian barrister, the 9th Chief Justice of New South Wales, and Lieutenant-Governor of New South Wales.

The late Supreme Court Justice Roddy Meagher describes Jordan as being one of New South Wales's foremost Equity Judges. He is described by biographer John Bennett as a "man of bookish tastes, ... respected rather than liked by most of his colleagues who, while recognizing his brilliance as a lawyer, found him cold as a person. He, in turn, despised the narrowness of many of his fellows, writing that 'those who are constrained to think for the purposes of their professions refrain in general from thinking about anything else'. He delighted to relax in his vast library, indulging his voracious appetite for Romance languages, and committing to memory the entire contents of many literary works". According to Bennett, Jordan was a daunting figure in court, and his manner was not just cold but chilling. His manner was bleak and he had no time for service out the strict call of duty. However, Jordan's associate, Justice Slattery recalls Jordan as "quietly spoken, of calm disposition, kind and relaxed but not much given to expressing emotion". Jordan was a man at ease in familiar surrounding, but less relaxed and ill-at-ease at times in public view. Jordan preferred to catch a tram to work each morning, and in the afternoon, would catch to the terminus in the opposite direction to ensure that he obtained a seat for the return journey home.

== Early years and education ==
Jordan was born on 13 October 1881 in London, the son of Frederick Jordan and Sarah Jordan (née Nobel). He grew up in Balmain, a suburb of Sydney, after his parents migrated to Australia in 1886 when Jordan was five. He attended Balmain Superior Public School, (Note: The School is next to Gladstone Park, Balmain, and was also referred to as Gladstone Park State School,) for his primary education and Sydney Boys High School for his secondary education. After leaving school, he was employed as a clerk in the Master in Lunacy's office between 1898 and 1900. He later worked as a shorthand writer and typist in the Public Library of New South Wales (now the State Library of New South Wales) from 1900 and the then State's Intelligence Department from 1906.

Jordan was a sub-editor of publications and compiler in the Bureau of Statistics from 5 June 1907. During this time, he began evening studies at the University of Sydney, which eventually led to him obtaining a Bachelor of Arts in 1904, and an LL.B. with second-class honours in 1907. He was a Wigram Allen Scholar in 1904 and a George and Matilda Harris Scholar in 1905.

Jordan was admitted to the New South Wales Bar on 19 August 1907 and practised from Selborne Chambers. He primarily practised in equity work. He took silk as a King's Counsel in 1928. He also lectured part-time in the law school of the University of Sydney.

He married Bertha Maud Clay on 9 January 1928 at St Stephen's Presbyterian Church, (Note: now a constituent church of the Uniting Church in Australia.) on Macquarie Street, Sydney.

== Judicial career ==
Jordan was appointed Chief Justice of the Supreme Court of New South Wales on 1 February 1934 in succession to Sir Philip Street. Jordan had not been a judge before his appointment and at the time had been a senior equity barrister in New South Wales. He was Chief Justice between 1934 and 1949. This was a difficult time for the court with a shortage of resources and manpower due to the Second World War, although Jordan's administrative skills helped the court through this period. He was appointed KCMG in 1936, two years after his appointment as Chief Justice. Jordan was dominant when presiding on a Full Court, with a reputation for being remote, devoid of "human passions and that he was only at home when plumbing the depths of Equity or when writing judgments replete with citation of authority and exposition of legal principle" and whose public utterances were said to be limited to "a few well-frozen words".

=== Decisions ===
Jordan in his time as Chief Justice sat on many cases. Perhaps the most notable case was Commissioner of Railways v Small. This case involved the issuing of a subpoena to a person not involved in the court proceedings. A subpoena issued in these circumstances is usually called a "fishing expedition" as the legal counsel involved in issuing the subpoena is fishing around for evidence that may or may not be there. The following passage is often cited in court decisions around Australia where Jordan said:

"The writ of subpoena duces tecum may be addressed to a stranger to the case or to a party. If it be addressed to a stranger, it must specify with reasonable particularity the documents which are required to be produced. A subpoena duces tecum ought not to be issued to such a person requiring him to search for and produce all such documents as he may have in his possession or power relating to a particular subject matter".

Another enduring judgment is in the appeal considered in R v Geddes. This decision is often cited in criminal appeals. Jordan held that after making allowance for any relevant considerations, there has to be a reasonable proportionality between a sentence and the circumstances of the crime, and that any sentence should be appropriate to the particular crime having regard to the gravity of the offence viewed objectively. He concluded that it was easier to see that a wrong conclusion had been applied rather than arrive at any fixed rules for solving the problem. He concluded with the classic line "the only golden rule is that there is no golden rule'.

Another notable case is In re Will of Gilbert (decd). This was an early case in which the Supreme Court said it would not unnecessarily interfere with interlocutory orders on an appeal. Jordan said "... I am of opinion that...there is a material difference between an exercise of discretion on a point of practice or procedure and an exercise of discretion which determines substantive rights. In the former class of case, if a tight rein were not kept upon interference with the orders of judges of first instance, the result would be disastrous to the proper administration of justice. The disposal of cases could be delayed interminably, and costs heaped up indefinitely, if a litigant with a long purse or a litigious disposition could, at will, in effect transfer all exercises of discretion in interlocutory applications from a judge in Chambers to a Court of Appeal."

Perhaps the funniest quote is in Ex parte Hebburn Ltd; Re Kearsley Shire Council. Jordan remarked in that case that "there are mistakes and mistakes".

=== The High Court and Jordan ===
Chief Justice Jim Spigelman writing in the Quadrant magazine, noted an interesting case of Browning v The Water Conservation & Irrigation Commission of NSW. This concerned a decision of the then Water Conservation and Irrigation Commission to deny in 1946 an Italian-born naturalised Australian a water license for irrigation. This was a time when irrigation was being introduced into the Riverina area of New South Wales as a result of the Snowy Mountains water scheme. The denial of the licence was based on policy considerations that licenses would not be granted to Italians for a number of policy reasons. Firstly, they had been enemy aliens during the Second World War. Secondly, it was considered that Italians were not good farmers. Lastly, it was undesirable for Italians to aggregate in the irrigation area. Jordan and the other members of the Full Court of the Supreme Court of New South Wales allowed Browning's application. Spigelman notes that in "blunt words" Jordan rejected the commission's use of the three considerations as it was "no business" of the commission to consider those matters in the granting of a license. The commission appealed to the High Court of Australia. The commission's appeal was unanimously allowed and Jordan's decision overturned. Spigelman notes that this was perhaps the low point of High Court jurisprudence particularly as the Chief Justice of the High Court, Latham, supported the commission's policy to exclude immigrants.

Sir Owen Dixon spoke of Jordan saying that it was a tragedy that Sir Frederick Jordan had not been appointed to the High Court stating that "I really do not know what, if anything happened; but at all events he was not appointed and by one of those curious twists which seem to touch the finest natures, this highly scholarly man and a very great lawyer eventually took some queer views about federation. But I do not think he would have taken them if he had been living amongst us."

== Government administration ==
Jordan was appointed as the Administrator of the Government of NSW between 28 October 1937 and 1 November 1937. (Note: Jordan, as the most senior judge of the Supreme Court, was appointed as the administrator in the absence of both the Governor, Lord Wakehurst, and the Lieutenant-Governor, former Chief Justice Sir Philip Street.) Sir Phillip Street died in 1938 and Jordan was appointed to replace him as Lieutenant-Governor of NSW, and Jordan was required to administer the Government of NSW in 1946 in the period between the resignation of Lord Wakehurst on 8 January and the appointment of Sir John Northcott on 1 August. Jordan became seriously ill in 1949 and died in his home at Vaucluse on 4 November 1949. He was accorded a state funeral. He was succeeded in office by Kenneth Whistler Street.

Frederick Jordan chambers in Martin Place is named after Jordan.

== Works ==
Jordan's notes of lectures delivered in the Law School of the University of Sydney were subsequently published as books, which were a major contribution to the practice of equity in Australia. These were reprinted in 1983 as "Sir Frederick Jordan Select Legal Papers". The authority of the books have been little doubted since Jordan first published them all those years ago. The foreword was written by Roddy Meagher QC, then a leading barrister and lecturer in the Faculty of Law at Sydney University, who stated that an indication of the 'current utility' of Sir Frederick's work was the reliance on them in recent High Court decisions, by reference to Legione v Hatley, and Hewett v Court.

On a lighter note, Roddy Meagher, by then a judge on the NSW Court of Appeal, argued that one particular footnote in "Chapters On Equity", was wrong. Meagher JA stated that "Great as is the homage we all owe to Sir Frederick Jordan, one must state that the footnote is nonsense. It has, of course, been approved by the High Court on about four occasions ... but that does not convert it into sense". Meagher JA then sets out why he says the footnote was wrong. Chief Justice Spigelman would later observe that the High Court judgments, to which Meagher JA referred with such scorn, were those mentioned in the foreword by Meagher JA as an indication of the 'current utility' of Sir Frederick's great work.

An article by Justice David Ipp written in a similar vein discusses one of Jordan's decision on malicious prosecution, and humorously suggests that Jordan may have been "recalcitrant".

Jordan was widely read and wrote notes as a review and impression of what he read as well as a collection of quotations and epigrams recording his observation of analogies and parallels found in literary works written across centuries in English, Greek, Latin, French, Italian and German. His long-time friend Sir Lionel Lindsay had these published under the titles Appreciations and Parallels.

== Sources ==
- Who's Who in Australia 1935, p. 262

Legal offices
Preceded by Sir Philip Street	Chief Justice of New South Wales; 1934–1949	Succeeded by Sir Kenneth Street
Government offices
Preceded by Sir Philip Street	Lieutenant-Governor of New South Wales; 1938–1949	Succeeded by Sir Kenneth Street
