= Andrew Bell (judge) =

Australian barrister

The Honourable Justice Andrew Bell AC

18th Chief Justice of New South Wales
- Incumbent
- Assumed office 7 March 2022
- Nominated by: Dominic Perrottet
- Appointed by: Margaret Beazley
- Preceded by: Tom Bathurst

Lieutenant-Governor of New South Wales
- Incumbent
- Assumed office 5 December 2022
- Nominated by: Dominic Perrottet
- Appointed by: Margaret Beazley
- Preceded by: Tom Bathurst

10th President of the New South Wales Court of Appeal
- In office 28 February 2019 – 7 March 2022
- Nominated by: Gladys Berejiklian
- Appointed by: David Hurley
- Preceded by: Margaret Beazley
- Succeeded by: Julie Ward

Judge of the New South Wales Court of Appeal
- Incumbent
- Assumed office 28 February 2019

Judge of the Supreme Court of New South Wales
- In office 28 February 2019 – 7 March 2022

Personal details
- Born: 21 February 1966 (age 60) Sydney
- Education: University of Sydney

Andrew Scott Bell AC (born 21 February 1966) is an Australian barrister serving as the Chief Justice of New South Wales and Lieutenant-Governor of New South Wales. He was appointed a Companion of the Order of Australia in the 2026 Australia Day Honours.

He was a Rhodes Scholar for New South Wales, and practised as a barrister-at-law. He is also an adjunct professor at the University of Sydney, and from 2019 was the President of the New South Wales Court of Appeal. On 7 March 2022, Bell was sworn in as the 18th Chief Justice of New South Wales, succeeding Tom Bathurst, who retired on 5 March 2022. As Chief Justice, he is the President of the Judicial Commission of New South Wales.

== Early life ==
Bell is the son of economist Harold Bell and art historian Pamela Bell. Bell grew up on the North Shore of Sydney and attended four schools, Balmoral Infants, Mosman Primary, Neutral Bay Opportunity and Sydney Grammar School At Sydney Grammar he captained the school cricket and debating teams and was Dux of the School.

== Academic life ==
Bell began his legal studies at the University of Sydney. He graduated in 1987 with a Bachelor of Arts and in 1989 a Bachelor of Laws with first class honours and receiving the University Medal in both degrees. Bell also received the Sydney University Convocation Medal. He was a resident from 1985 to 1989 at St Paul's College. He became a member of the College Council in 2004, and continued to serve as a member until 2013, and served as deputy chairman between 2010 and 2013. He was later in 2018 to commission a sculpture by Ayako Saito called “Heaven’s Door” for the college.

In 1989, Bell and Warren Lee won top honours in the World Universities Debate Championships held at Princeton, New Jersey, defeating debaters from the University of Toronto. The win was after an eight-day tournament organised by the American Whig-Cliosophic Society of Princeton University, involving 116 teams from 18 nations. The pair had in the semi-finals defeated a team from Yale University.

In 1990, Bell was the Rhodes Scholar for New South Wales and undertook a Bachelor of Civil Law at the University of Oxford. He graduated with First Class Honours and was awarded the Vinerian Scholarship for first place in the BCL. The following year he earned his doctorate from Oxford University. His thesis formed the basis for his book Forum Shopping and Venue in Transnational Litigation published by Oxford University Press. He was later to become a selection committee member of the Australian Rhodes Scholar's Association.

== Legal career ==
In 1990–1991, Bell was the Associate to the then Chief Justice of the High Court, Anthony Mason. It was there he met his wife, Joanna Bird, the Associate to Justice Michael McHugh. He was admitted as a barrister in 1995 and read with Phil Greenwood and Paul Brereton (who later became a Supreme Court Justice). He took silk in 2006. He had a broad national practice and appeared in both trials and appeals, including 30 High Court appeals. He was Treasurer, then Senior Vice President of the New South Wales Bar Association, a past chairman of a Professional Conduct Committee of that Association and was for many years the editor of the Bar Association's journal titled "Bar News".

He was twice the chairman of his chambers, Eleven Wentworth and he was a member of "Wentworth Wombats", described in his swearing-in speech as being "one of the finest cricket teams ever to leave these shores but never to taste success".

In 2008 he was appointed an adjunct professor at Sydney University Law School, where he taught private international law. Bell has co-authored three editions of Nygh's Conflict of Laws in Australia.

Bell is a Fellow of the Australian Academy of Law. His notable legal cases have included acting for former New Zealand Prime Minister David Lange against the Australian Broadcasting Corporation, for Qantas against Rolls-Royce, the Rinehart children in trust litigation against Gina Rinehart, and for Channel 7 in relation to cases arising from Australian Federal Police raids.

== Sculpture by the Sea ==
Bell was a long-time board member of Sculpture by the Sea exhibition. He became its chair between 2010 and 2016. He is credited with being instrumental in developing the event from an organisation barely able to stage two large exhibits in Sydney and Perth, to a well established non-for-profit cultural institution regarded as the peak body for sculpture in Australia. He introduced key changes such as a universal minimum income for artists in the Sydney exhibition, and later covering the costs of the heavy installation equipment for artists in both Sydney and Perth. He also developed initiatives such as "Sculpture at Barangaroo", held in 2016 and 2017, as well as the Sydney Sculpture Conference at the Sydney Opera House.

Bell would attend opening nights in Cottesloe wearing a Hawaiian shirt. In 2011 he escorted Crown Prince Frederik and Crown Princess Mary at the Sydney exhibition. Bell was later alleged to have said that his meeting with the Crown Princess was the highlight of their trip to Australia in 2011. At the 20th anniversary dinner for Sculpture by the Sea in 2016, Bell took the stage with a photograph of the Crown Princess with himself looming in the background and exclaimed how delighted the princess looked at seeing him.

== Judicial life ==
Bell was appointed as President of the NSW Court of Appeal on 28 February 2019. As President, he was an official member of the Judicial Commission of New South Wales. On 4 June 2019, he was sworn in as an Administrator of the State of New South Wales. Bell was sworn in on 7 March 2022 as the 18th Chief Justice of New South Wales, succeeding Tom Bathurst, who retired on 5 March 2022. As Chief Justice, he became the President of the Judicial Commission of New South Wales. He was sworn in as Lieutenant-Governor of New South Wales on 5 December 2022. On 9 May 2023, he opened the 58th Parliament of New South Wales while the Governor was in the United Kingdom for the coronation of Charles III.

His lead judgments include Searle v Commonwealth of Australia, an important case on the constitutional doctrine of "fettering" of discretionary powers of Government., R v Taylor concerning tendency evidence, Graylag Goose v Garuda concerning sovereign immunity, and Nyunt v First Property concerning the recognition and enforcement of foreign judgments.

Legal offices
Preceded by Tom Bathurst	Chief Justice of New South Wales; 2022 – present	Incumbent
Preceded by Tom Bathurst	Lieutenant-Governor of New South Wales; 2022 – present	Incumbent
Preceded by Margaret Beazley	President of the New South Wales Court of Appeal; 2019–2022	Succeeded by Julie Ward
