= Tom Bathurst =

Australian judge

The Honourable Tom Bathurst AC KC FRSN

Lieutenant-Governor of New South Wales
- In office 1 February 2012 – 5 December 2022
- Governor: Marie Bashir; David Hurley; Margaret Beazley
- Preceded by: James Spigelman
- Succeeded by: Andrew Bell

17th Chief Justice of New South Wales
- In office 1 June 2011 – 5 March 2022
- Nominated by: Barry O'Farrell
- Appointed by: Dame Marie Bashir
- Preceded by: James Spigelman
- Succeeded by: Andrew Bell

Personal details
- Born: 17 March 1948 (age 78) Richmond, England

Thomas Frederick Bathurst (born 17 March 1948) is an England-born Australian jurist who served as Chief Justice of the Supreme Court of New South Wales from 1 June 2011 to 5 March 2022. He also served as Lieutenant-Governor of New South Wales from 1 February 2012 to 5 December 2022.

== Early years and education ==
Thomas Frederick Bathurst was born on 17 March 1948 in Richmond, England. His parents were both Australian – his mother Joan Hartigan was a champion tennis player, while his father Hugh Moxon Bathurst was a public servant who was private secretary to Senator James Fraser when their engagement was announced. They married at St Mary's Cathedral, Sydney, in April 1947, before flying to Perth to board the Orion for England, where they planned to live for a few years while Joan resumed her tennis career.

In 1950, Bathurst returned to Sydney with his parents on the Strathmore, having spent the first few years of his life in Surrey. He was educated at Saint Ignatius' College, Riverview and in 1969 graduated from the University of Sydney with a Bachelor of Arts. Bathurst graduated in 1972 with a Bachelor of Laws from the Sydney Law School.

== Career ==
Bathurst was admitted as a solicitor in New South Wales in 1972 and joined the Sydney city firm of E. J. (Ernest) Kirby & Co. where his mentor was Ann Plotke.

In 1977, Bathurst was called to the New South Wales Bar; he was made Queen's Counsel in 1987. His primary areas of practice included appellate work in banking law, commercial law and equity. He was president of the Australian Bar Association from 2008 to 2009, and president of the NSW Bar Association from 2010–11.

=== Notable cases as counsel ===
Bathurst appeared for AWA in Daniels v Anderson (1995) 37 NSWLR 438, a leading Australian case on the duties of non-executive directors. He appeared for Dyson Heydon in Heydon v NRMA Ltd (2000) 51 NSWLR 1 in a successful appeal against a finding that Heydon was negligent in giving legal advice to the respondent company, an important case concerning a barrister's liability for professional advice. He appeared before the High Court of Australia in Peters (WA) Ltd v Petersville Ltd (2001) 205 CLR 126, a case which reviewed the scope of the common law doctrine of restraint of trade.

=== Chief Justice ===
On the recommendation of the NSW government, Governor Marie Bashir appointed Bathurst Chief Justice of the Supreme Court of New South Wales, effective 1 June 2011, and Lieutenant Governor of New South Wales from 1 February 2012. Tom Bathurst retired on 5 March 2022 and was succeeded by Andrew Bell.

== Personal life ==
Bathurst is married to Robyn; the couple have two daughters.

== Honours ==
In the 2014 Queen's Birthday Honours List, Bathurst was invested as a Companion of the Order of Australia (AC), for "eminent service to the judiciary and to the law, to the development of the legal profession, particularly through the implementation of uniform national rules of conduct, and to the community of New South Wales". Bathurst was elected Fellow of the Royal Society of New South Wales in 2018.

In the Spring 2023 honours list, Bathurst was made a member of the Order of the Rising Sun, Gold and Silver Star (Second Class).

Professional and academic associations
Preceded by Anna Katzmann	President of the New South Wales Bar Association; 2008 – 2011	Succeeded by Bernie Coles
Legal offices
Preceded by James Spigelman	Chief Justice of New South Wales; 2011 – 2022	Succeeded by Andrew Bell
Government offices
Preceded by James Spigelman	Lieutenant-Governor of New South Wales; 2012 – 2022	Succeeded by Andrew Bell
