= Judicial Commission of New South Wales =

Statutory corporation overview
- Formed: 17 September 1986
- Jurisdiction: New South Wales
- Minister responsible: Attorney General
- Statutory corporation executives: Hon. Andrew Bell, Chief Justice of NSW and President, Judicial Commission NSW; Una Doyle, Chief Executive
- Website: www.judcom.nsw.gov.au

The Judicial Commission of New South Wales is an independent statutory corporation of the New South Wales Government that provides sentencing information and continuing education to and examines complaints made against judicial officers in New South Wales, Australia.

The commission is headed by the Chief Justice of New South Wales, presently Andrew Bell, and consists of the heads of each of the major courts in New South Wales plus community representatives. Its powers are enshrined in the Judicial Officers Act 1986, and the Commission reports to the Attorney General, presently Hon.Michael Daley MP.

While the commission was originally the only body of its type in Australia, similar commissions have now been established in South Australia and Victoria. Similar bodies are also in existence in Canada, India and the United States. The work of the commission is split into two distinct areas. The first is a conduct division which deals with complaints about judicial officers. The other area is the educative function, which provides information on sentencing information, legal development and ongoing training for judicial officers.

The commission marked a significant change in the legal system in New South Wales. It restored public confidence in the judicial system, which had been rocked by a series of scandals and allegations of misconduct in the early 1980s. The commission eliminated the political process from the removal of a judge from public office. Judges were no longer subject to the whim of the government of the day in whether they could be removed from office. Instead, the commission now provides a means outside politics for the dispassionate consideration of misconduct by judicial officers. As one present judge has suggested, the commission has actually improved and safe-guarded independence of the courts. The model for a judicial commission has received support for introduction elsewhere in Australia.

== Historical monitoring of judicial conduct ==
The Crown has always appointed judges in New South Wales since the earliest days of the colony established in 1788 by the British when a deputy judge advocate was appointed. Judges were initially appointed subject to His Majesty's pleasure. Later, they were appointed for life. Now, judges are subject to a mandatory retirement age. A judge's appointment in the colonies was always subject to the Sovereign's pleasure. The judge could be recalled at any time. Jeffery Hart Bent, the first judge appointed in Australia, was removed from office and replaced with Barron Field in 1817 following Bent's unsatisfactory performance. Until the passing of the Australia Acts, a judge could also be suspended or “amoved” (a technical legal term for removal of a colonial judge from office) at any time by the governor of the colony or State. Prior to 1901, two judges, judges John Walpole Willis and Algernon Sidney Montagu, had been removed from office pursuant to the Colonial Leave of Absence Act 1782 (UK) (commonly known as Burke's Act). This was unlike their English counterparts. The Act of Settlement 1701 (UK) provided that judges could only be removed by the Crown on an address by both houses of the British Parliament. This was to overcome the Stuart period in England where judges favourable to the crown were appointed and unfavourable judges were removed. In 1830, Sir Jonah Barrington was the first Common Law judge removed from office under that law, and probably the only English to be so.

In modern Australia, the permanence of judges is one of the major aspects of judicial independence. It is also a feature of most other common law countries. Chief Justice Anthony Mason explained the importance of this feature as follows:

"Judicial independence is a privilege of, and a protection for, the people. It is a fundamental element in our democracy, all the more so now that the citizen’s rights against the state are of greater value than his or her rights against another citizen."

In other words, the public expects that a judge should be free to decide a case in accordance with the law of land even if that is contrary to the government's wishes of the day without fear of retribution to the judge. As a result, there is an expectation that judges should only be removed from office when they have misbehaved in some manner, and that a single judge should not be targeted without due cause. Prior to the establishment of the commission, when a judge misbehaved, there was no established procedures for determining his or her guilt in the matter.

Balanced against the right to permanence is the need for the judiciary to remain accountable. Canadian judge Mr Justice Ridell said that "judges are the servants, not the masters of the people". Shetreet argues that no institution can operate without being answerable to society. The judiciary must also be accountable, as judicial independence cannot be maintained without accountability. The commission provides an impartial means of accountability for the judiciary.

The commission is not involved when a government re-organises a court. This is where a court is abolished completely or replaced with a new court or tribunal. In Attorney-General (NSW) v Quin, the High Court held that it was legitimate for all judicial officers of a court to be removed together provided that it was a "genuine reorganisation" of the court. That case involved a situation in New South Wales where all Stipendiary Magistrates in the Court of Petty Sessions were removed from office. A new court, the Local Courts, were introduced in their place. Most stipendiary magistrates were reappointed magistrates in the new court. However, a number of them were not re-appointed to the replacement Local Court without a satisfactory explanation being given. The High Court overturned the decision by the Court of Appeal of New South Wales directing the New South Wales Government to consider their re-appointment. The views of the High Court on this matter have now been removed through amendments to the New South Wales Constitution. New South Wales now provides protection to all judicial officers against arbitrary removal except through a recommendation through the commission.

== Establishment of the commission ==
On 18 November 1986, Attorney General Terry Sheahan announced a number of reforms to the New South Wales justice system. Along with the creation of the commission, the government was to introduce a Director of Public Prosecutions, abolish the office of Clerk of the Peace, and give courts the sole control over the listing of criminal cases in the justice system. The justice system reforms were brought about following a series of controversies concerning judicial figures in Australia in 1985. That year saw a judge of the High Court of Australia and a judge of the District Court of New South Wales both charged and acquitted of charges of attempting to pervert the course of justice. The Chairmen of the Bench of Magistrates (now called Chief Magistrate), Murray Farquhar, was also to face charges. He was convicted of attempting to pervert the course of justice and served a prison sentence. In the Murphy case, the Australian Government enacted the Parliamentary Commission of Inquiry Act 1986 (Cth) to appoint a commission of inquiry to investigate the question of whether the judge should be removed from the High Court because of the lack of an established procedure. A similar situation arose in Queensland with a Supreme Court judge.

The commission's purpose is to ensure that there is a proper independent process of dealing with misconduct claims against judicial officers and that this process was to be made more transparent. The commission was modeled on the Californian Commission on Judicial Performance. At the time of the establishment of the commission, the commission did not meet with universal approval. Judges resisted the first draft because of its removal the traditional role of parliament in removing a judicial officer. The initial proposal provided that the governor could remove a judge after the conduct division made a report. This was changed to the current situation where a report is made to parliament, which then decides whether to ask the governor to remove the judge concerned.

There were other concerns. Justice Malcolm McLelland of the Supreme Court said:

"the mere establishment of an official body with the express function of receiving complaints against judges as a first step in an official investigation renders judges vulnerable to a form of harassment and pressure of an unacceptable and dangerous kind, from which their constitutional position and the public interest require that they should be protected."

One District Court judge also predicted that there would be "a tidal wave of complaints against judges in criminal cases". Contrary to those expectations, the number of actual complaints is extremely low, and of those, very few are actually substantiated. As anticipated, most complaints have been of a trivial nature or have been made by the disgruntled losers of litigation. Most have been dealt with routinely and dismissed as having no merit. The number of complaints started as around 20 per year, peaked at 55 per year, and reduced back down to 30. The success of the commission is shown in that two investigations have actually resulted in one judicial officer resigning and in the other resulting in parliament considering the removal of another judicial officer.

== Composition ==
The commission is established as the “Judicial Commission of New South Wales” as a corporation under the Judicial Officers Act 1986 (NSW). It is usually referred to as the “Judicial Commission”. There are six official members and four appointed members. The six official members consist of:

- the Chief Justice of New South Wales
- the President of the Court of Appeal of New South Wales
- the Chief Commissioner of the Industrial Relations Commission of New South Wales,
- the Chief Judge of the Land and Environment Court of New South Wales
- the Chief Judge of the District Court of New South Wales
- the Chief Magistrate of the Local Court of New South Wales.

The four appointed members are appointed by the Governor of New South Wales on the recommendation of the Attorney General after consultation with the chief justice.

Whilst judicial officers are members of the corporation, it is an executive body rather than a judicial body.

== Functions ==
The commission has the following general functions:

- to assist the courts to achieve consistency in imposing sentences
- to organise and supervise an appropriate scheme for continuing education and training of judicial officers
- to examine complaints against judicial officers and
- to give advice to the Attorney-General on such matters as the commission thinks appropriate.

The Commission may organise and supervise an appropriate scheme for the continuing education and training of judicial officers. The commission has an extensive educational role in New South Wales. It is a world leader in providing judicial education. It provides orientation classes for new magistrates in New South Wales. It has provided formal programmes for judicial officers about aboriginal cultural awareness and gender awareness. It works with other bodies to provide education to judges from other Australian States as well as overseas countries. The Commission may, for the purpose of assisting courts to achieve consistency in imposing sentences by monitoring sentences and disseminating information and reports on sentences. In carrying out this task, the commission assists the courts in achieving consistency in sentencing. The commission maintains various computerised databases (such as the Judicial Information Research System, commonly known as "JIRS" and the Sentencing Information System "SIS") which record and analyse sentence information from New South Wales courts . The commission also produces bulletins and research papers on sentencing practice in New South Wales. The use of these resources has improved the ability of courts to sentence offenders by providing them with “legal, factual and statistical data” on the types of crimes, trends in other courts, and appeal information.

The commission has a complaints function. Any person may complain to the commission about the judicial conduct of a judicial officer. Complaints to the commission are classified as either serious or minor. A complaint is considered serious if it could justify parliamentary consideration of the removal of the judicial officer complained about from office. This is defined in the New South Wales Constitution as "proved misbehaviour or incapacity". Every other complaint is classified as "minor". This is not a reflection of its importance, only that conduct outlined in the complaint would not result in the New South Wales Parliament removing that judicial officer because of the complaint. Generally, these relate to matters that may affect the performance of the judicial officer concerned.

A serious complaint must be referred to the Conduct Division unless it is a complaint that can be summarily dismissed. A minor complaint must be referred to the Conduct Division unless the commission considers that it should not be referred. In the latter case, the complaint can be referred to the head of the court to deal with it. Allegations of corruption or the commission of criminal offences are handled by the appropriate law enforcement bodies.

== The conduct division of the commission ==
The Conduct Division sits as a panel of three person and deals with any complaint referred to it by the commission. It is technically a separate body to the commission. The members of the division are appointed by the commission, and do not need to be members of the commission. The general practice is that they are not. Two of the members of the panel must be judicial officers. The other is a community representative appointed by the New South Wales Parliament. Parliament appoints two community representatives for this purpose on a non-political bi-partisan basis. The community representative cannot be legally qualified. Hearings may take place in public or in private. The judicial officer complained against may be legally represented and is entitled to call witnesses and is also able to cross-examine any witnesses called against them. In most respects, the examination takes place in the same manner as a royal commission.

The panel may dismiss the complaint if the complaint is not substantiated. If the complaint is substantiated, the panel must send a report to the senior judicial officer of the court concerned, to the governor, the attorney general, the complainant, the judicial officer concerned, and both Houses of Parliament. The report is tabled in both House of Parliament. Parliament after receiving the report may address the governor seeking the removal of the judicial officer concerned.

== Notable cases ==
=== 1998: McDougall and Bruce cases ===
The conduct division has reported to parliament in respect of Magistrate Ian Lanham Ross McDougall and Justice Vince Bruce in 1998. Following the tendering of the report to parliament, McDougall resigned his commission. Bruce had a number of complaints made against him in respect of the delays in the delivery of his judgments. The conduct division inquired as to whether he should be removed from the bench. There was medical evidence that he had suffered from depression but that treatment meant that his depression had plateaued. A majority of the members of the conduct division decided that the Bruce's conduct should be reported to the parliament. Bruce took action in the New South Wales Court of Appeal seeking judicial review of that decision. The court upheld that there was no basis in law for overturning the decision, and the report was tabled in parliament. Parliament declined to remove Bruce from office, and after Bruce delivered his last outstanding judgment, he resigned from the bench. David Flint criticized Bruce for his "campaign" in the media to defend himself. Bruce appeared on an Australian television programme 60 Minutes to argue his case. Flint argues that if this had been an ordinary citizen, both Bruce and the media would have been charged with contempt.

=== 2026: Freund case ===
In 2026, the Judicial Commission made adverse findings against Sharon Freund, the deputy chief judge of the Local Court of New South Wales, following a bullying complaint she had lodged with the commission against Michael Allen, the court's chief judge. Allen was also a member of the Judicial Commission. He subsequently sent a copy of the commission's findings to Attorney-General Michael Daley. The Judicial Commission then referred Freund to the commission's Conduct Division.

Freund subsequently applied to the New South Wales Court of Appeal for review of the Judicial Commission's decision to refer her to the Conduct Division. During the proceedings it was found that Allen had been inadvertently sent copies of the commission's papers in relation to the case and that he had discussed the case with Murugan Thangaraj, another member of the Judicial Commission, via Whatsapp. The Court of Appeal found that these incidents constituted apprehended bias against Freund and overturned the referral to the Conduct Division. Legal commentator Janet Albrechtsen subsequently criticised the Court of Appeal for its refusal to release transcripts and documents from the hearing and the practice of allowing sitting judges to serve on the Judicial Commission and hear complaints relating to their own courts.

== Aftermath of the commission ==
The commission is regarded as a leader in judicial education. The complaint handling process of the commission has the support of the public and the courts. Judges note that the commission has led to an improved perception of the justice system and has actually improved accountability and independence for the judiciary. The safeguards for independence were reinforced in 1998 when the New South Wales Constitution was amended to entrench the provisions that prevent a judge being removed from office except after the preparation of a report by the conduct division of the commission. Indeed, the model for the commission has been recommended for introduction at the federal level in Australia.
