= Samuel Milford =

Australian judge (1797–1865)

Samuel Frederick Milford (16 September 1797 – 26 May 1865) was a barrister and judge, active in colonial New South Wales from 1843, a judge of Supreme Court of New South Wales.

Milford was born in Exeter, Devon, England, the eldest son of Samuel Frederick Milford, D.L., of Heavitree, Devonshire. He received his preliminary education at the High School, Exeter, and afterwards graduated M.A. at St John's College, Cambridge. He was called to the Bar at Lincoln's Inn, London, and practised his profession for several years at Bristol, where he held the appointment of judge of the Diocesan Ecclesiastical Court.

Owing to bad health, he was induced to seek an appointment in Australia. Through the influence of his cousin Sir William Webb Follett, the then Attorney-General of England, he was appointed Master in Equity of New South Wales, and left London in September 1842 for Sydney. He landed on 1 January 1843, and held the post of Master in Equity, together with that of Chief Commissioner of Insolvent Estates, until his appointment as Resident Judge in the district of Moreton Bay (now Queensland) in January 1856. Then he returned to Sydney in February 1859, and was a Supreme Court Judge till his death on 26 May 1865 in Maitland, New South Wales. He held also during this period the offices of Judge of the Court of Vice-Admiralty and Primary Judge in Equity.

== Personal ==
Milford married Eliza Butler. Their family included

- Major General Sussex Charles Milford (1825 – 1 April 1892)
- Herman George Milford (17 March 1830 – 15 November 1865) lawyer
- Dr Frederick Milford (1834 – 1 August 1902), surgeon
- Henry John Bede Milford (1 January 1833 – 29 February 1888), lawyer and politician. He married Catherine Charlotte Dick (1833 – 26 October 1884) c. May 1856. Their son Ernest Alexander Milford (19 December 1858 – 2 October 1942), was a lawyer in Queensland and New South Wales.
- Sophia Milford married Albrecht Feez on 13 October 1857
