= James Spigelman =

Australian judge

The Honourable James Spigelman AC KC
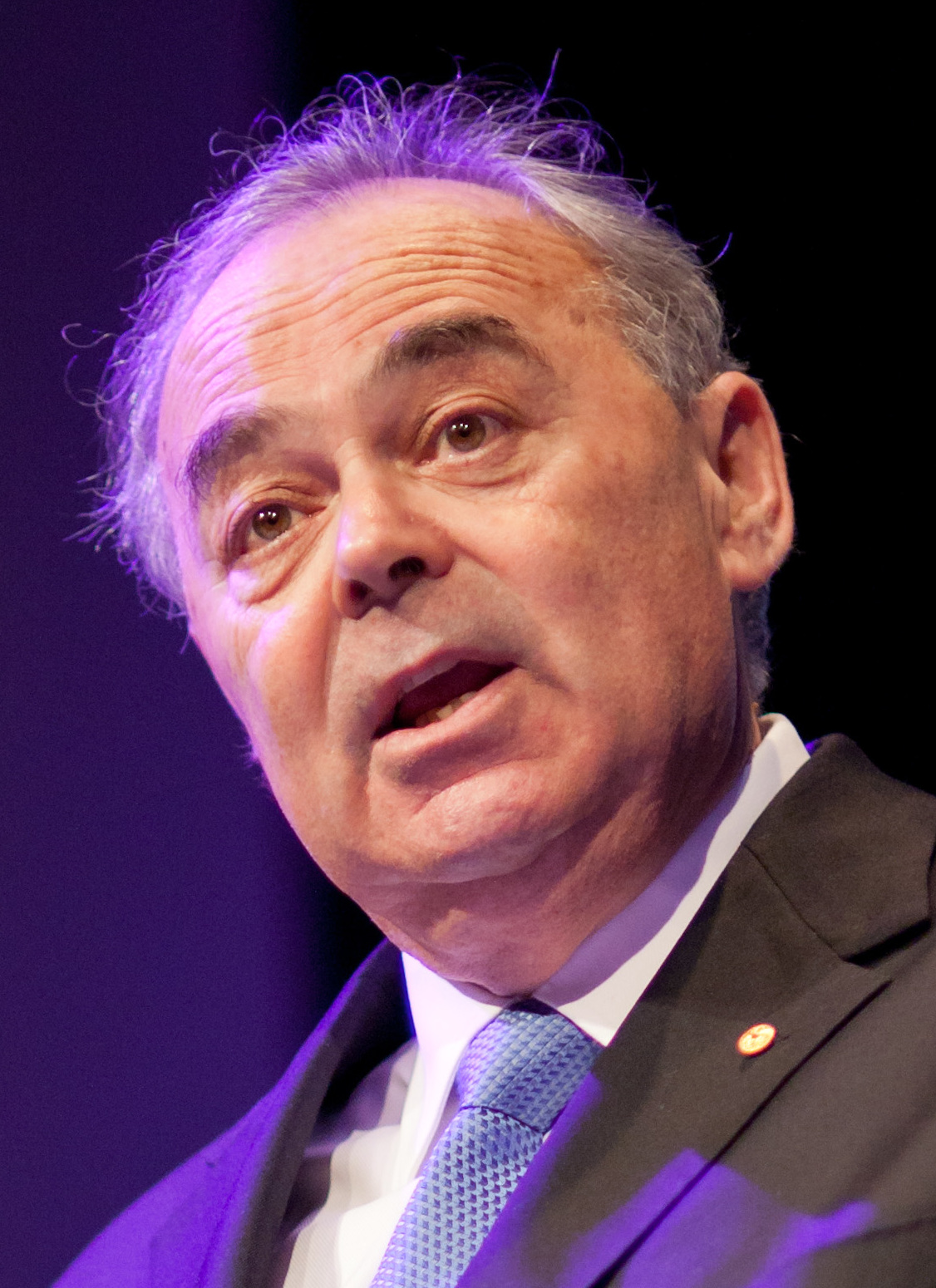
- Spigelman in 2012

16th Chief Justice of New South Wales
- In office 25 May 1998 – 31 May 2011
- Nominated by: Bob Carr
- Preceded by: Murray Gleeson
- Succeeded by: Tom Bathurst

Lieutenant-Governor of New South Wales
- In office 18 June 1998 – 1 February 2012
- Governor: Gordon Samuels; Marie Bashir
- Preceded by: Murray Gleeson
- Succeeded by: Tom Bathurst

Chair of the Australian Broadcasting Corporation
- In office 1 April 2012 – 31 March 2017
- Preceded by: Maurice Newman
- Succeeded by: Justin Milne

Secretary of the Department of the Media
- In office 30 June 1975 – 22 December 1975

Personal details
- Born: 1 January 1946 (age 80) Sosnowiec, Poland
- Spouse: Alice Spigelman

James Jacob Spigelman AC KC (born 1 January 1946) is a former Australian judge who served as Chief Justice of New South Wales from 1998 to 2011, and also as Lieutenant-Governor of New South Wales from 1998 to 2012. He served on the Court of Final Appeal of Hong Kong as a non-permanent judge from other common law jurisdictions from April 2013 to his early resignation in September 2020. Spigelman also served as chairman of the Australian Broadcasting Corporation from 2012 to 2017.

== Early years and education ==
Spigelman was born in Sosnowiec, Poland, on 1 January 1946. He arrived in Australia with his family in 1949 and attended Maroubra Public School and later Sydney Boys High School. He then went on to study Arts at the University of Sydney, where he attained First-Class Honours in Government and Second-Class Honours (Division 1) in Economics. Subsequently, he studied law, graduating in 1971 with First-Class Honours and the University Medal.

Spigelman participated in and helped organise the 1965 Freedom Ride, a project undertaken by students to draw attention to problems faced by Indigenous communities in NSW. In 1969 he was President of the Students' Representative Council. From 1969-1971, he was the Student Fellow of the University Senate.

== Career ==
=== Early legal career ===
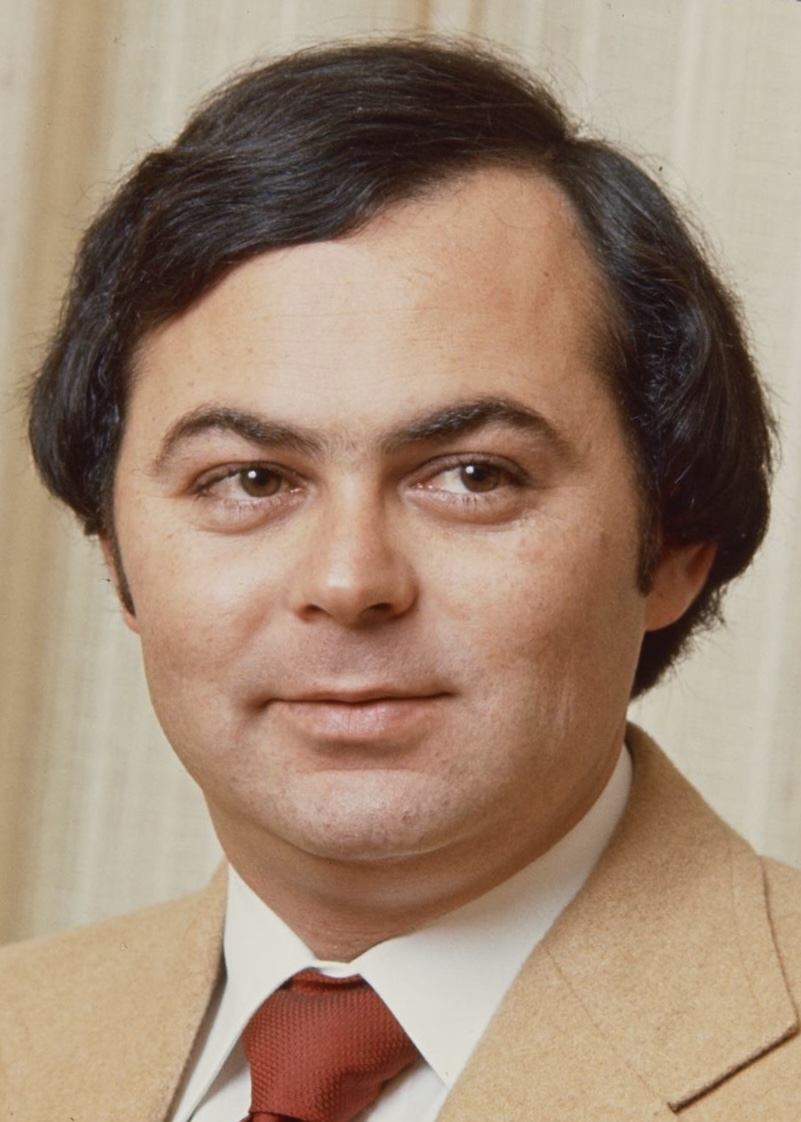
Spigelman in 1974

Spigelman was admitted to practise as a solicitor in 1972. From 1972 to 1975, he served as Senior Advisor and Principal Private Secretary to the Prime Minister Gough Whitlam. In 1975, he was appointed the Secretary of the Department of the Media.

In 1976 Spigelman was admitted to the NSW Bar. He did not commence practice until three years later, when he first served for several years as a member of the Australian Law Reform Commission and also spent time overseas. Spigelman's primary areas of practice at the bar included constitutional law, administrative law, and appellate work.

In 1986, Spigelman was appointed Queen's Counsel; and, in 1997, he served as Solicitor-General of New South Wales.

=== Judicial career ===
Spigelman in 2006

The Premier Bob Carr appointed Spigelman Chief Justice of the Supreme Court of New South Wales, and Lieutenant-Governor of NSW, effective 25 May 1998.

Spigelman was regarded as the favourite to succeed Murray Gleeson as Chief Justice of the High Court of Australia when he stepped down in late 2008. However, this appointment went instead to Robert French.

On 18 March 2011, Spigelman announced his decision to resign as Chief Justice, effective 31 May 2011. Reviewing Spigelman's 13-year term of office, Sydney Morning Herald columnist, David Marr commented that "... the Chief Justice of NSW .... blazed an incomparable trail.... every stage of Jim Spigelman's remarkable career has been like that: briefly surprising and then absolutely convincing". Marr claims that Spigelman's achievements include the renewal of the ranks of the Supreme Court, running a polite and friendly Court, and modernising the Court's business practices and rules. According to Bret Walker SC, Spigelman was renowned for "... showing his decided preference for efficient, better-value-for-money justice."

He retired on 31 May 2011 and was succeeded by Tom Bathurst QC. Spigelman has also been a judge of the Supreme Court of Fiji.

He was also appointed to the Court of Final Appeal of Hong Kong as non-permanent judge from other common law jurisdictions in April 2013 and reappointed to a term that was not due to expire until 2022; however, after the Hong Kong chief executive denied the practice of the separation of powers in Hong Kong in September 2020, he became the first foreign judge to resign from the court, citing concerns over the national security legislation recently imposed by the Chinese government on the territory.

=== Chairman of the ABC ===
On 8 March 2012, Prime Minister Julia Gillard announced Spigelman would become chairman of the Australian Broadcasting Corporation (ABC), starting a 5-year term on 1 April 2012. His term finished in March 2017 and he was replaced by Justin Milne in April 2017.

== Personal life ==
Spigelman is Jewish and is a child of Holocaust survivors, Gustawa and Majloch, who feature in the graphic novel Maus, written by Spigelman's cousin Art Spiegelman. Spigelman’s parents were 2 of 15 survivors among 72 Spigelman relatives. Spigelman's surname was originally spelt Szpiegelman until his parents altered it to Spigelman when moving to Australia after the Holocaust ended.

Spigelman and his two brothers, Mark Spigelman and Allan Spigelman, have been recognised for their respective achievements and contributions to Australia following the family’s Holocaust survival.

Spigelman is married to author and clinical psychologist Alice Spigelman AM. Her directorships have included The Benevolent Society, UNHCR, Bundanon Trust, NIDA, Australian Institute of Music and the Rural Leadership Program. She is currently the Chair of Sculpture by the Sea having been a board member since 2010.

=== Community leadership ===
Spigelman has a strong interest in the arts. His community involvement includes:

- Chairman of the Film Finance Corporation Australia Ltd (1990–1992)
- Chair of the National Library of Australia Council (2010–present)
- Deputy Chairman of the Art Gallery of New South Wales (1983–1988)
- President of the Museum of Applied Arts and Sciences (1995–1998)
- Member of the Council of the National Gallery of Australia (1995–1998)
- Member of the Board of the Brett Whiteley Foundation (1995–1998)
- Councillor of the Australian Film Television and Radio School (1975–1978)

== Honours ==
- Justice Spigelman became a Companion (AC) of the Order of Australia (AC) in 2000, for services to law and to the community through leadership in bringing about change in attitudes to the administration of justice for a more fair and equitable society, and to the support of the visual arts.
- In 2001, Justice Spigelman was one of over 15,000 Australians to be awarded a Centenary Medal.
- He has received honorary doctorates from two universities in Sydney: University of Sydney, Doctor of Laws (honoris causa), 2004; and Macquarie University, Doctor of Letters (honoris causa), 2012.

Legal offices
Preceded by Murray Gleeson	Chief Justice of New South Wales; 1998–2011	Succeeded by Tom Bathurst
Government offices
Preceded by James Oswin	Secretary of the Department of the Media; 1975	Department abolished
Preceded by Murray Gleeson	Lieutenant-Governor of New South Wales; 1998–2012	Succeeded by Tom Bathurst
Media offices
Preceded by Maurice Newman	Chair of the Australian Broadcasting Corporation; 2012–2017	Succeeded by Justin Milne
