= Chief Justice of New South Wales =

Senior judge

The chief justice of New South Wales is the senior judge of the Supreme Court of New South Wales and the highest-ranking judicial officer in the Australian state of New South Wales. The chief justice is both the judicial head of the Supreme Court as well as the administrative head, responsible for arranging the business of the court and establishing its rules and procedures.

The current chief justice is Andrew Bell who was appointed by Governor Margaret Beazley.

== List of chief justices of New South Wales ==
No.	Image	Chief Justice	Term began	Term ended	Time in of office	Governor appointed	Notes
1		Sir Francis Forbes	13 October 1823	1 July 1837	13 years, 261 days	Major General Sir Thomas Brisbane	
2		Sir James Dowling	29 August 1837	27 September 1844	7 years, 29 days	General Sir Richard Bourke	
3		Sir Alfred Stephen	7 October 1844	6 November 1873	29 years, 30 days	Major Sir George Gipps	
4		Sir James Martin	19 November 1873	4 November 1886	12 years, 350 days	Hercules Robinson, 1st Baron Rosmead	
5		Sir Julian Salomons	12 November 1886	27 November 1886	15 days	Charles Wynn-Carington, 3rd Baron Carrington	
6		Sir Frederick Darley	29 November 1886	4 January 1910	23 years, 36 days	Charles Wynn-Carington, 3rd Baron Carrington	
7		Sir William Cullen	28 January 1910	27 January 1925	14 years, 365 days	Frederic Thesiger, 3rd Baron Chelmsford	
8		Sir Philip Street	28 January 1925	31 January 1934	9 years, 3 days	Admiral Sir Dudley de Chair	
9		Sir Frederick Jordan	1 February 1934	4 November 1949	15 years, 276 days	Admiral Sir Dudley de Chair	
10		Sir Kenneth Street	6 January 1950	27 January 1960	10 years, 21 days	Lieutenant General Sir John Northcott	
11		Herbert Evatt	15 February 1960	24 October 1962	2 years, 251 days	Lieutenant General Sir Eric Woodward	
12		Sir Leslie Herron	25 October 1962	22 May 1972	9 years, 210 days	Lieutenant General Sir Eric Woodward	
13		Sir John Kerr	23 May 1972	27 June 1974	2 years, 35 days	Sir Roden Cutler	
14		Sir Laurence Street	28 June 1974	1 November 1988	14 years, 126 days	Sir Roden Cutler	
15		Murray Gleeson	2 November 1988	21 May 1998	9 years, 200 days	Air Marshal Sir James Rowland	
16		James Spigelman	25 May 1998	31 May 2011	13 years, 6 days	Gordon Samuels	
17		Tom Bathurst	1 June 2011	5 March 2022	10 years, 277 days	Dame Marie Bashir	
18		Andrew Bell	7 March 2022		3 years, 198 days	Margaret Beazley	

== See also ==
- Judiciary of Australia
