= Margaret Beazley =

Governor of New South Wales since 2019

Her Excellency The Honourable Margaret Beazley AC, KC
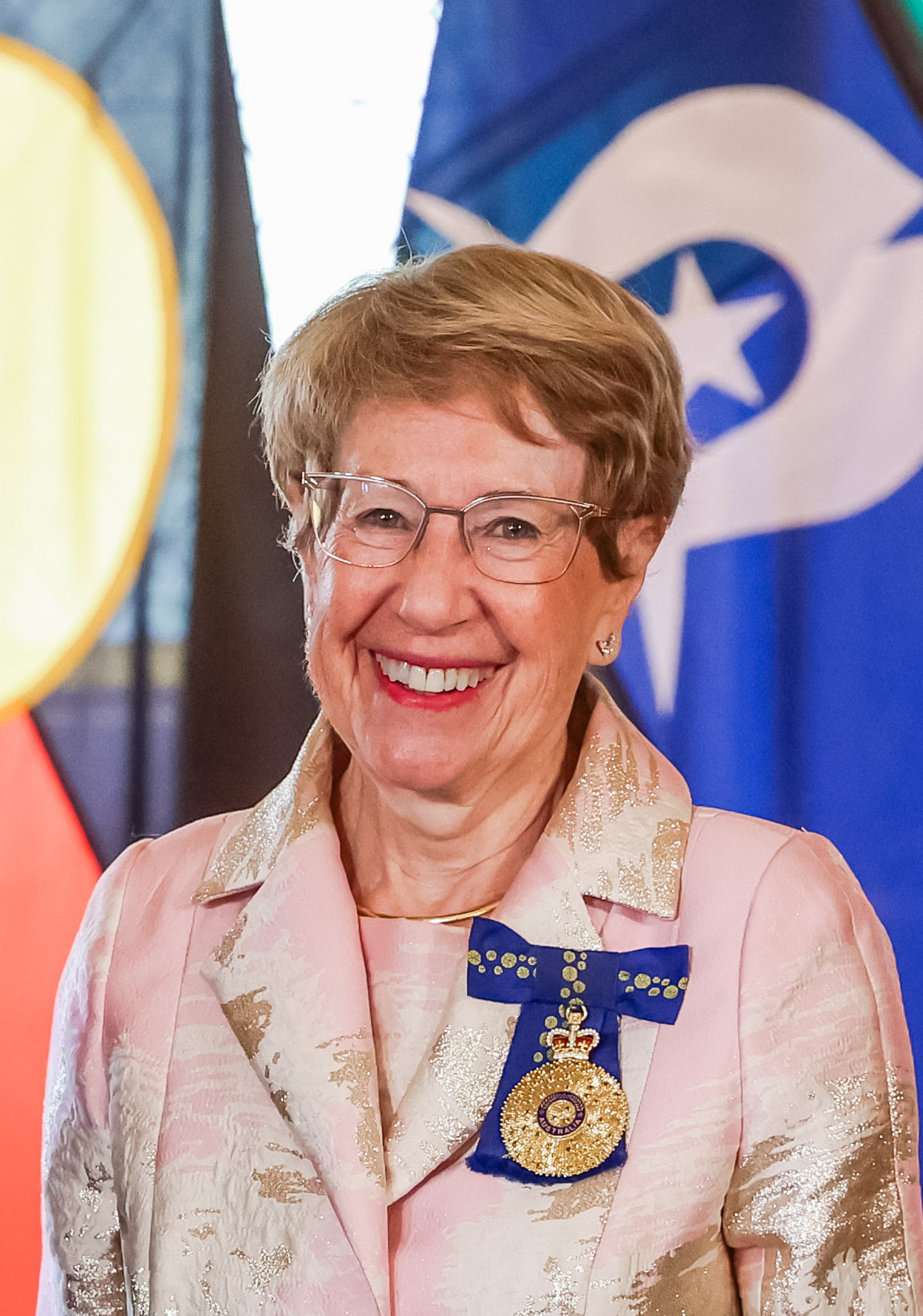
- Beazley in 2025

39th Governor of New South Wales
- Incumbent
- Assumed office 2 May 2019
- Monarchs: Elizabeth II; Charles III
- Premier: Gladys Berejiklian; Dominic Perrottet; Chris Minns
- Lieutenant: Tom Bathurst; Andrew Bell
- Preceded by: David Hurley

9th President of the New South Wales Court of Appeal
- In office 1 March 2013 – 27 February 2019
- Preceded by: James Allsop
- Succeeded by: Andrew Bell

Judge of the New South Wales Court of Appeal
- In office 28 March 1996 – 1 March 2013

Judge of the Federal Court of Australia
- In office 1 January 1993 – 28 April 1996

Personal details
- Born: 23 July 1951 (age 75) Sydney, New South Wales, Australia
- Spouses: Alan Sullivan (divorced); Dennis Wilson
- Children: 3
- Education: Sydney Law School
- Alma mater: University of Sydney

Margaret Joan Beazley (born 23 July 1951) is an Australian jurist who is the 39th and current governor of New South Wales, serving since 2 May 2019. She was the president of the New South Wales Court of Appeal, the first woman to hold the office, from March 2013 until February 2019.

== Early life ==
Beazley was born and grew up in Hurstville, New South Wales, one of five children to Gordon and Lorna Beazley; her father worked as a milkman. She was educated at Catholic schools – St Declan's Primary School in Penshurst, St Joseph's Girls High School in Kogarah, and Mount Saint Joseph, Milperra. Beazley graduated from the Sydney Law School at the University of Sydney in 1974 in law, with honours.

== Legal career ==
Beazley served her articles of clerkship with Winter & Sharp, and was admitted to the New South Wales Bar in 1975. She was appointed Queen's Counsel in 1989.

Beazley was a Judicial Member of the Equal Opportunity Tribunal from 1984 to 1988. She was an Acting District Court Judge from 1990 to 1991. From 1991 to 1992, Beazley served as Assistant Commissioner of the Independent Commission Against Corruption. She was a judge of the Federal Court of Australia from 1993 to 1996, an additional Judge of the Supreme Court of the Australian Capital Territory from 1994 to 1997, and a judge of the Industrial Relations Court of Australia from 1994 to 1996.

From 1996 to 2019, she was a Judge of Appeal of the New South Wales Court of Appeal. She was President of the court, the first woman to hold the office, from 2013 until February 2019.

Beazley has also served on the Australian Executive of Amnesty International (1980).

== Governor of New South Wales ==
In January 2019, Beazley accepted the position of 39th Governor of New South Wales, succeeding David Hurley, and was sworn in as governor on 2 May 2019. In 2020, she was promoted to Companion of the Order of Australia for eminent service to the people of New South Wales, particularly through leadership roles in the judiciary, and as a mentor of young women lawyers.

In November 2021, it was reported that a member of the governor's staff had anonymously lodged whistleblower complaints about bullying with the Department of Premier and Cabinet, which provides staff for the governor's office. Following an investigation, the Department—while not referring to a decision—thanked the complainant and promised measures to foster a "respectful" workplace culture in the office.

Beazley's term in office was extended in March 2024 to May 2026 and then her term was extended again in January 2026 to 1 May 2028.

== Honours and awards ==
Companion of the Order of Australia (AC)	2020
Officer of the Order of Australia (AO)	2006
Dame of Grace of the Order of St John of Jerusalem	2019

=== Honorary appointments ===
- (Australia) 2019: Honorary Colonel of the Royal New South Wales Regiment.
- 2019: Governor of the New South Wales Police Force.
- (United Kingdom) 2019: Deputy Prior of the Order of St John.
- 2019: Honorary Commodore, Royal Australian Navy.
- 2019: Honorary Air Commodore of No. 22 Squadron Royal Australian Air Force.

=== Honorary degrees ===
- (New South Wales) 2008: Honorary Doctorate of Laws (LLD) by the University of Sydney.
- (New South Wales) 2019: Honorary Doctorate of Laws (LLD) by the Australian Catholic University.
- (New South Wales) 2022: Honorary Doctorate of Laws (LLD) by The University of Notre Dame Australia.

== Personal life ==
Beazley is married to Dennis Wilson. She has three adult children from her first marriage to barrister Alan Sullivan. She and Sullivan were reportedly "the first husband and wife from the private legal profession to become QCs".

== See also ==
- List of judges of the Supreme Court of New South Wales

Government offices
Preceded by David Hurley	Governor of New South Wales; 2019–present	Incumbent
Legal offices
Preceded by James Allsop	President of the New South Wales Court of Appeal; 2013–2019	Succeeded by Andrew Bell
