= List of Chinese Australians =

This is a list of notable Chinese Australians.

== Media and the arts ==
=== Actors and filmmakers ===
Natasha Liu Bordizzo

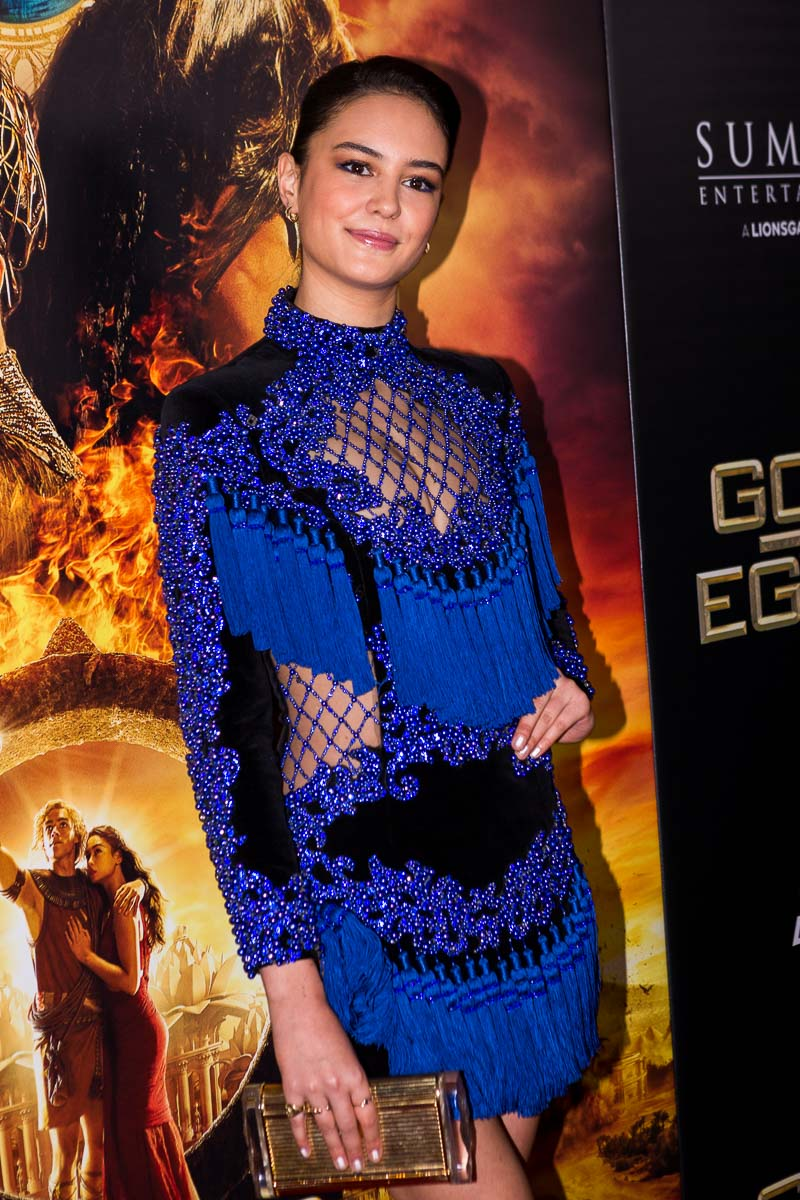
Courtney Eaton

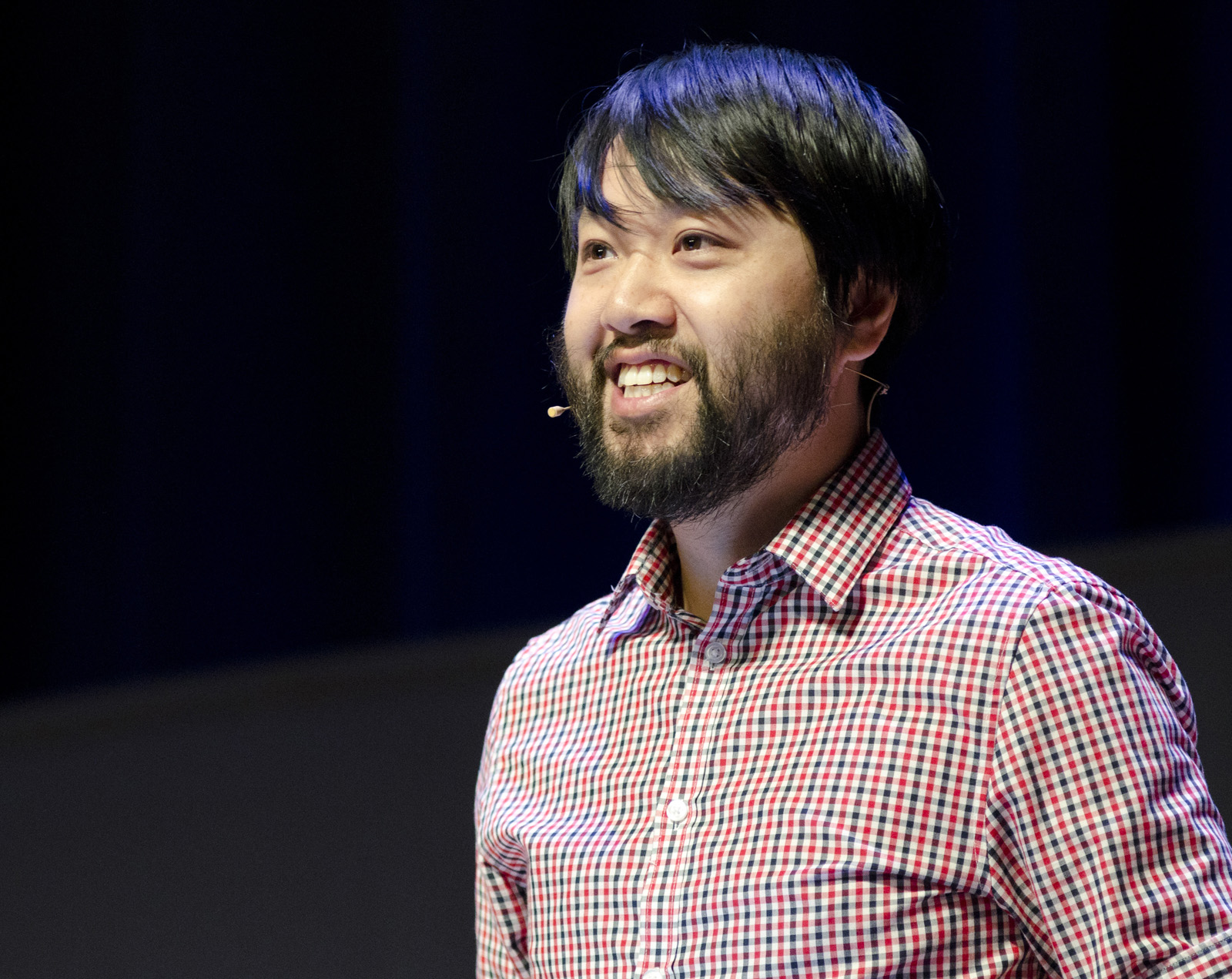
Lawrence Leung

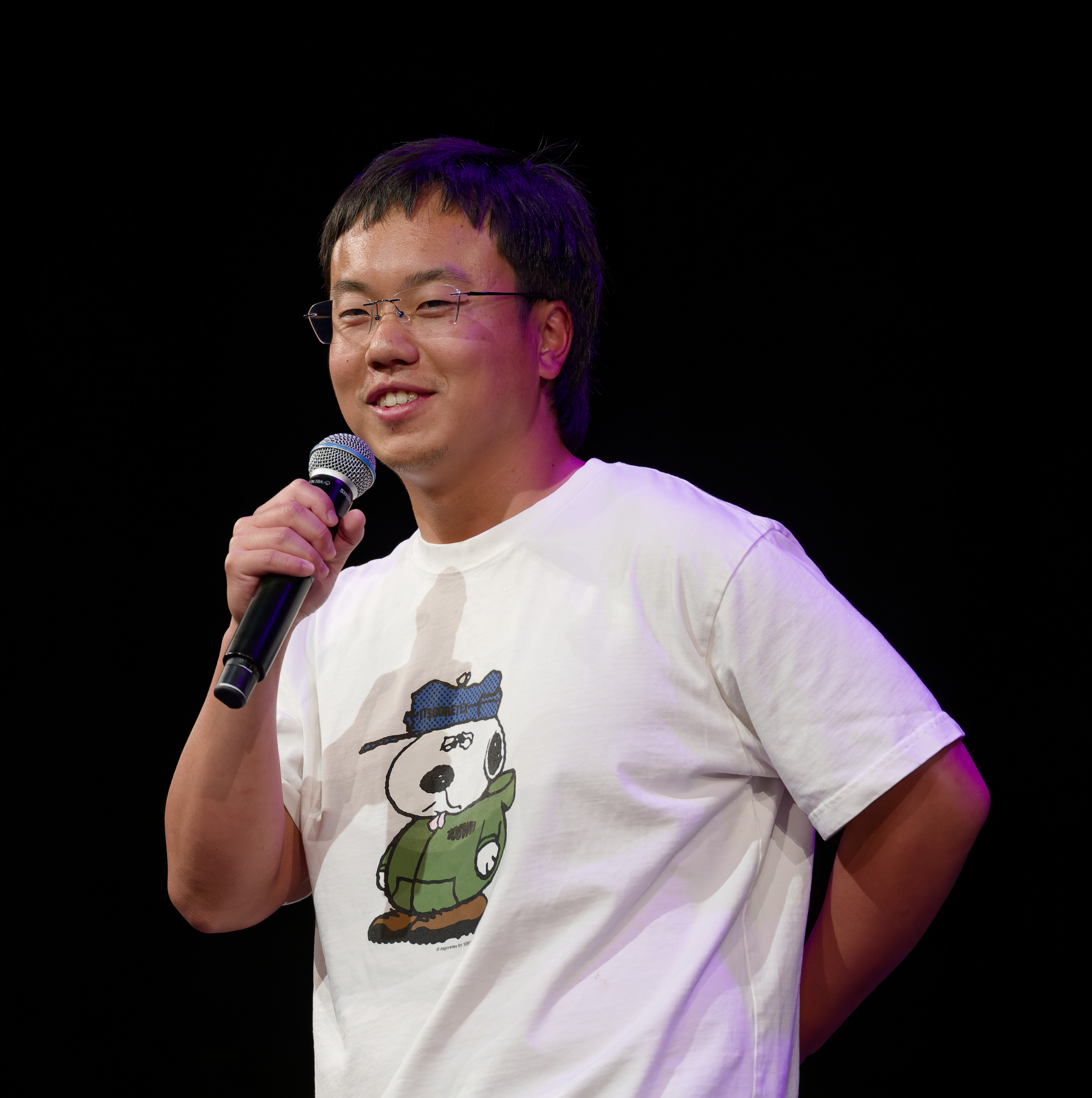
Aaron Chen

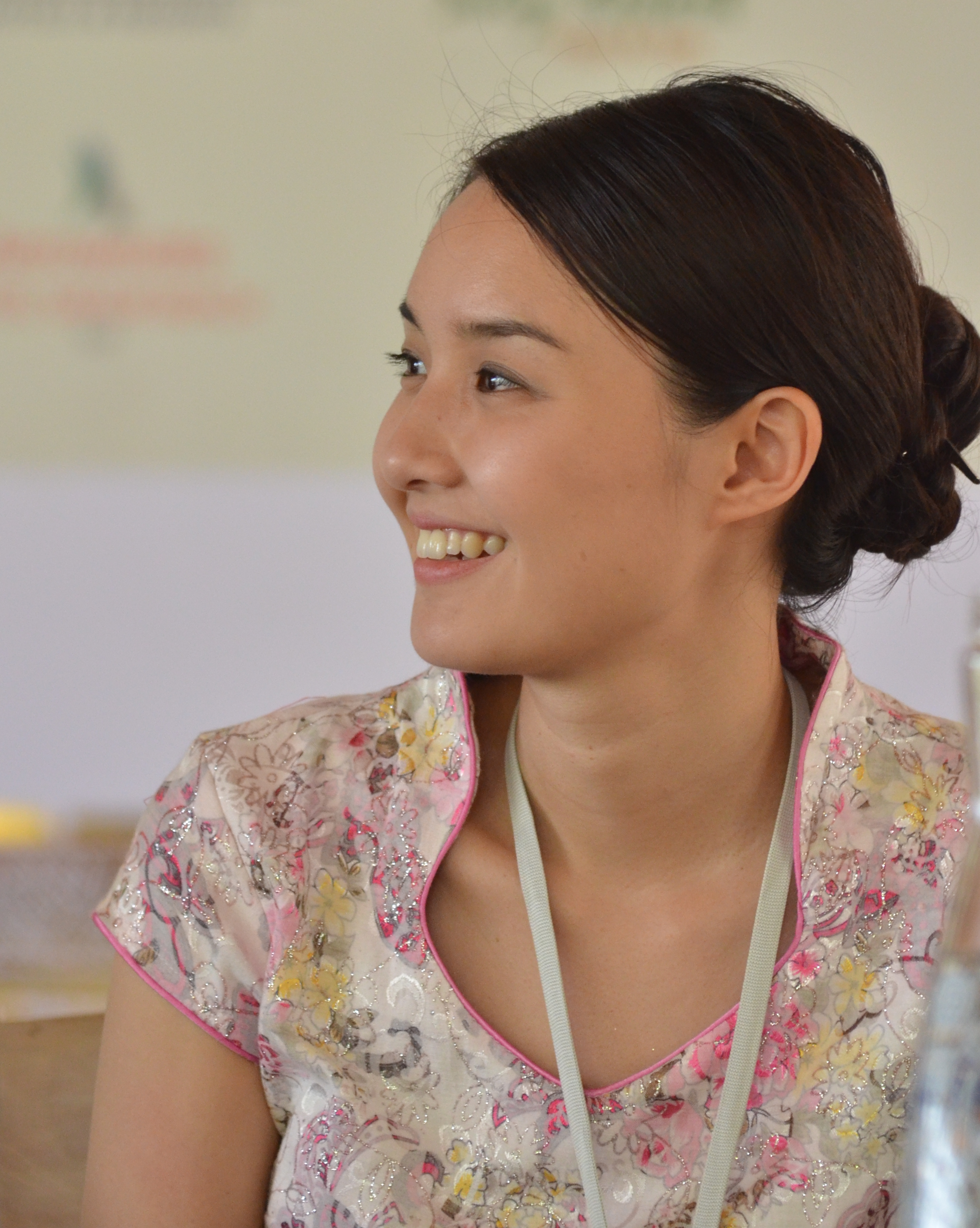
Alice Pung

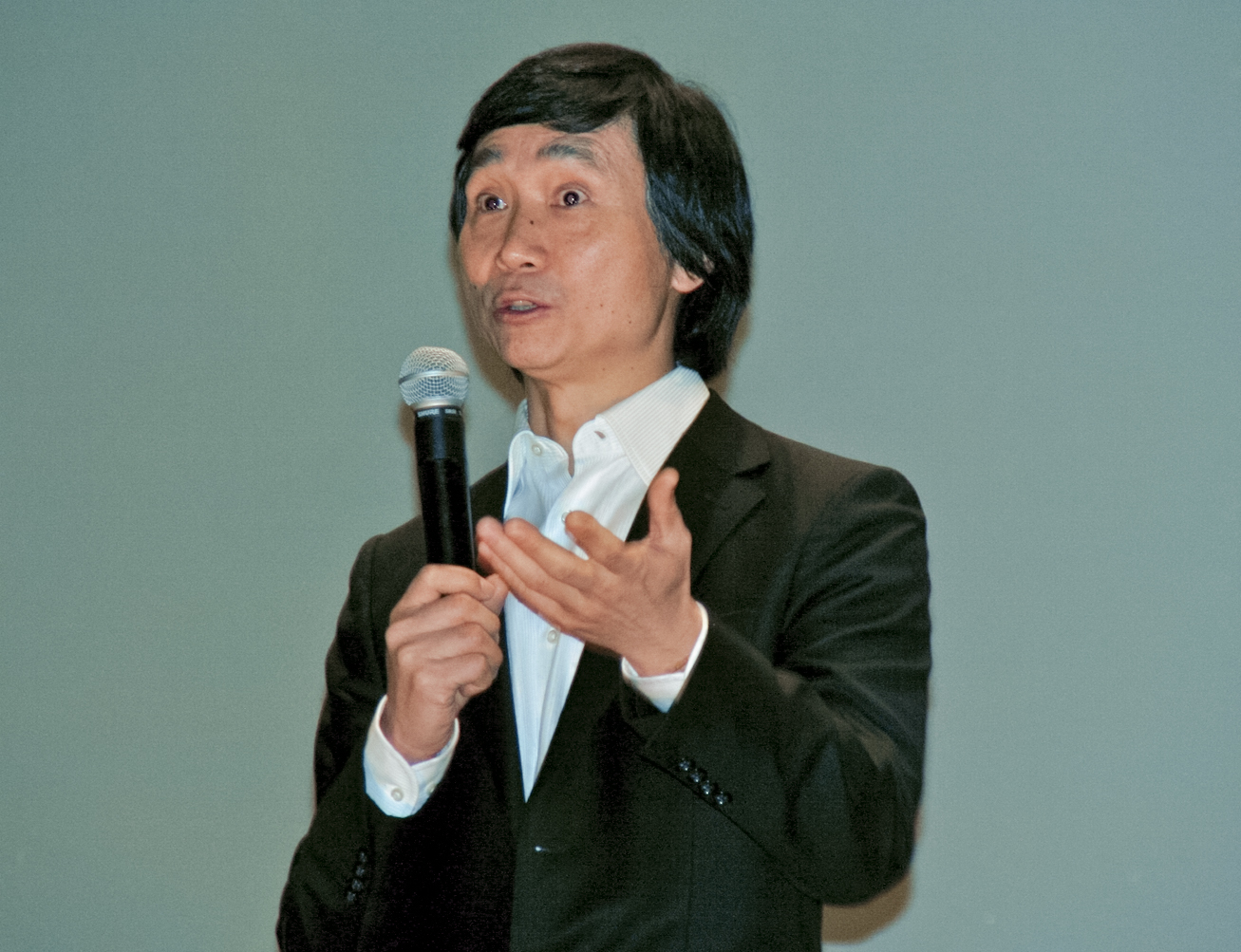
Li Cunxin

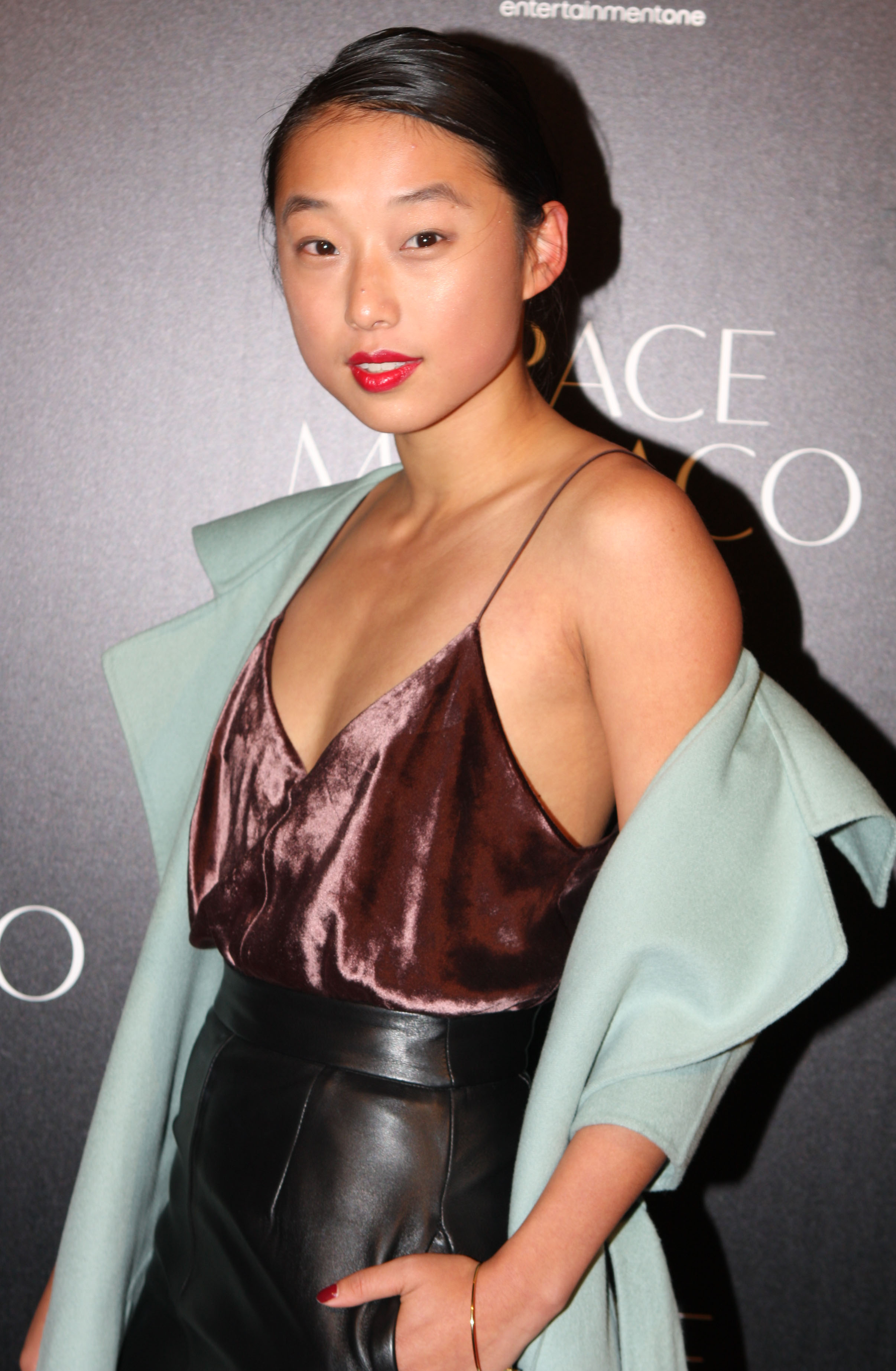
Margaret Zhang

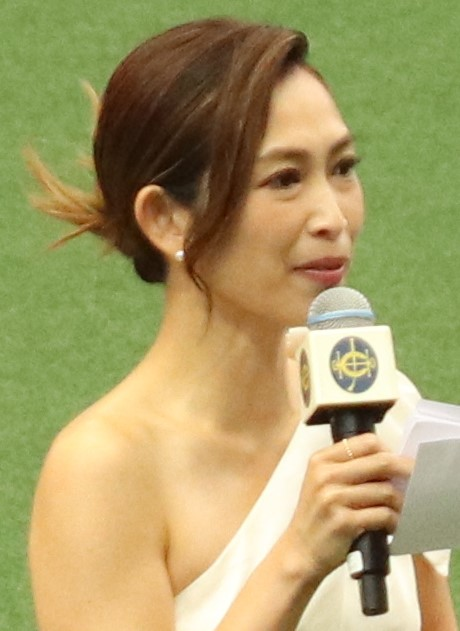
Sarah Song

- Tony Ayres: showrunner, screenwriter and director; known for The Slap, Netflix's Clickbait, The Home Song Stories and Stateless
- Natasha Liu Bordizzo: actor, portrayed Snow Vase in Netflix's Crouching Tiger, Hidden Dragon: Sword of Destiny
- Jason Chan: actor and director, known for portraying the Green Samurai Ranger, in Power Rangers Ninja Storm
- Courtney Eaton: actor and model, her debut role was in Mad Max: Fury Road
- Alexander Hodge: actor, best known for portraying Andrew on the HBO series Insecure
- Guang Li: actor, known for appearing in the 2008 film The Children of Huang Shi, where he played the role of Shi-Kai
- Renee Lim: actor and media personality, known for her role in Please Like Me
- Diana Lin: actor, known for her role as Awkwafina's mother in the 2019 comedy-drama film The Farewell
- Nina Liu: actor, best known for portraying Chloe in the television series The Secret Life of Us
- Jaymee Ong: actor and model, known for her role in Gen-X Cops
- Chris Pang: actor, best known for his roles in the films Tomorrow, When the War Began and Crazy Rich Asians
- Sarah Song: television actor and presenter
- Shaun Tan: artist, writer and filmmaker, won an Academy Award for The Lost Thing
- Ling Cooper Tang: actor, known for her role as Dr. Kylie Preece in the hospital drama TV series All Saints
- Vico Thai: television and film actor, known for his role as Lam Bui on Disney+ series Last Days of the Space Age
- James Wan: film director, writer, and producer of the Saw film franchise

=== Television and radio presenters ===
- Lee Lin Chin: news reader, best known for her 30-year career as the anchor for SBS World News and her fashion
- Elizabeth Chong AM: chef, author and television presenter
- Anna Choy: actress, television presenter and weather presenter
- Kylie Kwong: chef, restaurateur and media presenter
- Benjamin Law: author, screenwriter, and journalist
- Adam Liaw: winner of MasterChef Australia 2010 and television host
- Helene Chung Martin: former ABC correspondent and author
- Cindy Pan: physician and media personality
- Sam Pang: comedian, radio and television presenter, writer and producer
- Annette Shun Wah: media presenter
- Poh Ling Yeow: artist, grand finalist on MasterChef Australia 2009

=== Music and performing arts ===
- Jimmy Chi: composer, musician and playwright who created the iconic 1990 musical Bran Nue Dae
- Richard Clapton: singer-songwriter, most famous hit is his 1975 single "Girls on the Avenue", which reached number one on the Australian charts
- Jeff Fatt AM: musician, best known as 'the purple Wiggle' from the children's group The Wiggles
- Li Cunxin AO: ballet dancer, author and public speaker
- Russell Jack AM: founder and director of the Golden Dragon Museum
- Natalie Ong: singer, season 8 finalist of The X-Factor Australia
- Li-Wei Qin: cellist, won First Prize at the 2001 International Naumburg Competition in New York
- Rose Maud Quong: actor, performer and author; had a transnational career spanning Australia, the United States and United Kingdom
- TwoSet Violin: YouTube violinist duo made up of Brett Yang and Eddy Chen

=== Comedy ===
- Aaron Chen: comedian, television personality, and actor; in 2026 toured the US supporting American comedian Ali Wong
- Michael Hing: comedian, podcaster, actor, and former presenter on Network Ten's The Project
- Lizzy Hoo: standup comedian, writer and television personality
- Lawrence Leung: comedian, writer and director; best known for his TV series Lawrence Leung's Choose Your Own Adventure
- Jenny Tian: standup comedian, television personality

=== Fashion ===
- Claudia Chan Shaw: fashion designer and television presenter
- Lisa Ho: fashion designer, celebrated globally during a special design segment at the Sydney 2000 Olympic Games opening ceremony
- Jenny Kee AO: pioneering Australian fashion designer celebrated for her vibrant "Australiana" knitwear and prints that feature native flora and fauna
- Bowie Wong: fashion and stage designer
- Margaret Zhang: filmmaker, writer, model, creative director, and Editor in Chief of Vogue China

=== Books and writing ===
- Queenie Chan: comic artist, co-wrote and illustrated the graphic novel In Odd We Trust
- Yang Hengjun: political blogger, author of Fatal Weakness series
- Ouyang Yu: poet, novelist and author of The Eastern Slope Chronicle
- Alice Pung OAM: bestselling author of the memoirs Unpolished Gem and Her Father's Daughter, editor and lawyer
- Gabrielle Wang: writer and illustrator for children and young adults
- Wong Shee Ping (c. 1875–1948): author of The Poison of Polygamy, political activist

=== Visual arts ===
- Shen Jiawei: painter, winner of the 2006 Sir John Sulman Prize
- Liang Xiao Ping: pioneer calligrapher, artist, poet and scholar
- Shaun Tan: artist, author and illustrator; known for his graphic novel The Arrival
- John Zerunge Young AM: artist
- Bin Xie: painter, finalist for the 2006 Archibald Prize
- William Yang: social history photographer, playwright, artist, and filmmaker

== Politics ==
=== Cabinet ===
- Penny Wong: leader of the Government in the Senate, minister for Foreign Affairs, minister for Finance and Deregulation, minister for Climate Change

=== Federal Parliament ===
- Sam Lim: Federal member for Tangney (Labor, 2022–present)
- Gladys Liu: Federal member for Chisholm (Liberal, 2019–2022)
- Sally Sitou: Federal member for Reid (Labor, 2022–present)
- Tsebin Tchen: Federal senator for Victoria (Liberal, 1999–2005)
- Dio Wang: Federal senator for Western Australia (Palmer United, 2014–2016)

=== State and territory parliaments ===
- Helen Sham-Ho OAM: Liberal member of the Legislative Council of New South Wales (State Parliament) 1988–2003
- Peter Wong AM: member of the Legislative Council of New South Wales (State Parliament), 1999–2007; founder, Unity Party (Australia), 1998
- Michael Choi: Labor member of the Queensland Legislative Assembly (State Parliament), 2001–2012
- Jing Lee MLC: Liberal member of the Legislative Council of South Australia since 2010 (State Parliament)
- Ernest Wong, Labor MLC: member of the Legislative Council of New South Wales 2013–2019 (State Parliament)
- Hong Lim MP: Labor member of the Legislative Assembly of Victoria 1996–2018
- Bernice Pfitzner MLC: Liberal member of the Legislative Council of South Australia, 1990–1997
- Pierre Yang: Member of the Western Australian Legislative Council: Labor member for Electoral region of South Metropolitan since 2017
- Jack Ah Kit: Labor member for Arnhem in the Northern Territory Legislative Assembly 1995–2005
- Harriet Shing: member of the Victorian Legislative Assembly representing the Eastern Victoria Region for the Labor Party since 2014
- Jenny Leong: member of the New South Wales Legislative Assembly representing Newtown for the Greens since 2015
- Ngaree Ah Kit: Labor member for Karama in the Northern Territory Legislative Assembly since 2016
- Geoff Lee: member of the New South Wales Legislative Assembly representing Parramatta for the Liberal Party 2011–2023
- Jason Yat-Sen Li: member of the New South Wales Legislative Assembly representing Strathfield for the Labor Party since 2022

=== Mayors ===
- Harry Chan: first Chinese mayor of Darwin, Australia
- Wellington Lee AM OBE: deputy lord mayor of Melbourne, 1999–2000
- Alec Fong Lim AM: lord mayor of Darwin, 1984–1990
- Katrina Fong Lim: lord mayor of Darwin, 2012-2017
- John So AO: lord mayor of Melbourne, 2001–2008
- Henry Tsang OAM: parliamentary secretary to the premier; deputy lord mayor, Sydney, 1991–1999

=== Other politics ===
- William Ah Ket: barrister and early 20th-century campaigner for Chinese rights
- Charles Que Fong Lee: diplomat

== Culinary ==
- Elizabeth Chong AM: celebrity chef, restaurateur, cookbook author, media and TV host
- Kylie Kwong: chef, author, television presenter and restaurateur
- Hetty Lui McKinnon: award-winning plant-based cookbook author
- William Chen Wing Young: established Wing Lee, a restaurant and food manufacturing business in Melbourne; inventor of dim sim

== Academia ==
- Chin Liew Ten (C. L. Ten): FAHA FASSA, emeritus professor of Philosophy and former head, Philosophy Department, National University of Singapore
- Mabel Lee: literary scholar and translator
- Terence Tao: math genius winner of Fields Medal
- Wang Gungwu: AO CBE, historian, vice-chancellor of Hong Kong University (1988–1995), president of the Australian Academy of the Humanities (1980–1983)
- Xiaokai Yang: economist
- Yen Ching-hwang: historian
- Jenny Zhang: chemist, BBSRC David Phillips Fellow at the Department of Chemistry, University of Cambridge
- Liangchi Zhang: professor of engineering, University of New South Wales

== Military ==
- William Edward Sing, DCM: served in the Australian Imperial Force during World War I, best known as a sniper during the Gallipoli Campaign
- Jack Wong Sue OAM: World War II special forces soldier, Borneo campaign, post-war businessman, and author

== Business ==
- Ah Hong: Chinese market gardener in Alice Springs
- Louis Ah Mouy: businessman
- Wong Ah Sat: gold digger, farmer, and merchant
- Charlie Houng On Yee: tailor, gardener and businessman from Darwin.
- Myrtle Houng On Yee; businesswoman from Darwin
- Xu Rongmao: billionaire, AFR rich lister, chairman and founder, Hong Kong-based Shimao Property
- David Teoh: billionaire, AFR rich lister, former chairman and founder, TPG (ISP)
- Chau Chak Wing: billionaire, AFR rich lister, Guangzhou-based property developer
- Marita Cheng: founder of Robogals and 2012 Young Australian of the Year
- Kwong Sue Duk: pioneer herbalist and merchant
- Chin Kaw: Tasmanian herbalist, merchant, and mining entrepreneur
- Neale Fong: doctor and sports administrator
- Selina Hassan: businesswoman in Darwin
- Stern Hu: businessman
- Bing Lee: businessman who started up the Bing Lee franchises
- Gloria Ouida Lee: who was also Western Arrernte, miner in Central Australia
- Andrew Leon: businessman in Cairns, Queensland
- Lum Loy: businesswoman in Darwin
- Yew-Kwang Ng: economist at Monash University
- Trevor O'Hoy: former CEO of Foster's Group
- Tom See Poy: department store owner in Innisfail, Queensland
- Ping Que: merchant and miner
- Mei Quong Tart: 19th-century businessman and public figurehead
- David Wang: businessman
- Yet Soo War Way Lee: merchant
- Way Key: merchant

== Sport ==
- Richard Chee Quee: cricketer
- William Cheung: kung fu practitioner
- Jian Fang Lay: table tennis player
- Les Fong: Australian rules footballer
- Kevin Gordon: rugby league footballer
- Priscilla Hon: tennis player
- Lin Jong: Australian rules footballer
- Cheltzie Lee: figure skater
- Anthony Liu: figure skater
- Miao Miao: table tennis player
- Jack O'Chin: rugby league player
- Anne Pang: kung fu practitioner
- Barry Pang: kung fu practitioner and horse racing, first Chinese Australian to own a winner of the Melbourne Cup
- Hunter Poon: first player of Chinese descent to appear in Australian first-class cricket
- Esther Qin: diver
- Amy Sayer: association footballer
- Dannie Seow: Australian rules footballer
- Kenneth To: swimmer
- Brian To’o: rugby league footballer
- Li Tu: tennis player
- Tina Wang: figure skater
- Jin Woodman (born 2009): wheelchair tennis player
- Jack Wunhym: Australian rules footballer
- William Yang: swimmer

== Medicine ==
- Victor Chang AC: heart surgeon
- Cindy Pan: celebrity doctor and sexual/women's health expert
- Charles Teo AM: neurosurgeon
- Jane Elizabeth Tye: midwife in Darwin
- John Yu AC: paediatrician and 1996 Australian of the Year

== Religion ==
- Greg Homeming: Catholic bishop
- Ivan Lee: Anglican bishop
- Shui Kwong Lo: Methodist minister

== Other ==
- James Chung Gon: community leader, merchant, and philanthropist in Tasmania
- Russell Jack AM: founder and director of the Golden Dragon Museum
