= List of people from Darwin =

The following is a list of notable people who come from or who have significant associations with Darwin, Northern Territory, Australia:

== Sport ==
- Robbie Ahmat
- Joe Anderson
- Zac Bailey
- Ben Barba
- Graeme Brown
- Peter Burgoyne
- Anthony Corrie
- Kerry Dienelt
- Frank Farina
- Fabian Francis
- Mark Hickman
- Stephen Holt
- Joel Jeffrey
- Michael Long
- Jesse Makarounas
- Damien Martyn
- Adrian McAdam
- Gilbert McAdam
- Andrew McLeod
- Paul Miller
- Nova Peris-Kneebone
- Cyril Rioli
- Daniel Rioli
- Maurice Rioli
- Rohan Sajdeh
- Horrie Seden
- D'Arcy Short
- Cameron Stokes
- Mathew Stokes
- John Tambouras
- Hamilton Thorp
- Jake Weatherald
- Matthew Whelan
- Erika Yamasaki

== Arts ==
- Rob Collins
- McLean Edwards
- The Groovesmiths
- Jessica Mauboy
- Tex Perkins
- The Poor
- Miranda Tapsell
- Thylacine
- Gregg Turkington
- Vassy

== Health ==
- Sarah Hang Gong
- Jane Elizabeth Tye

== Media ==
- Charlie King
- Michael Tunn
- Ron Wilson

== Politics ==
- John Anictomatis
- Denis Burke
- Bob Collins
- Paul Everingham
- William Forster
- Stephen Hatton
- Goff Letts
- Peter Loveday
- Brian Frank Martin
- Brian Ross Martin
- Clare Martin
- Malarndirri McCarthy
- Dean Mildren
- James Muirhead
- Harold Nelson
- Barry O'Farrell
- Kevin O'Leary
- Trevor Riley
- Stephen Southwood
- Shane Stone
- Ian Tuxworth

== Business ==
- Sue Wah Chin
- Selina Hassan
- Andrew Liveris
- Lum Loy
- V Pappas
- Edward Pretty
- Charlie Houng On Yee
- Myrtle Houng On Yee

== Other ==
- Lillian Dean
- Olga Havnen
- Bruce Litchfield
- Shui Kwong Lo
- Alan Powell
- Lily Ah Toy
