= Peter Loveday =

Peter Loveday may refer to:

- Peter Loveday (singer-songwriter), Australian singer-songwriter
- Peter Loveday (historian), Australian metallurgist, historian and political scientist
- Pete Loveday, British underground cartoonist
