= Myrtle Houng On Yee =

(Australian businesswoman (1914-1997)

Myrtle Houng On Yee (born Fong Kim Lan, 鄺金蘭) (29 June 1914 - 24 November 1997) was a Chinese-Australian businesswoman and soft drink manufacturer from the Northern Territory.

She was a leader within the Darwin Chinese community and a matriarch of her family.

== Life in the Northern Territory ==
Yee was born in the Brocks Creek mining region of the Northern Territory and was the daughter of Chinese-born parents Fong Ding (鄺敬肇) and Wong See (黄氏) who worked as market gardeners and miners. She was the sixth child of nine and, soon after her birth, the family moved to Pine Creek.

In Pine Creek Yee attended school intermittently, due to the care of the younger children in her family, until the age of eleven when her father died and the family moved to Emungalan, in Katherine. There she started helping more with her families businesses, including helping her elder brother (George Lim) at his butchers shop and making flour deliveries by car. Cars were rare at this time and Yee was not legally allowed to drive, as she was only 13, but it appears to have the blessing of the local police sergeant.

In 1928, at the age of 15, it was reported with admiration in the Northern Territory Times that she had driven the dangerous roads between Katherine and Pine Creek, 92 kilometres (57 mi), to assist her mother who needed medical attention. They called these roads "the worst in Australia" and that although the journey took 14 hours she was able to make it without trouble and that the car was "without a scratch".

On 12 May 1930, at the age of 16, Yee married Charlie Houng On Yee (餘洪安) in a marriage that had been arranged for them. Charlie was also an Australian-born child of Chinese migrants. Their marriage, at the Kuo Ming Tang buildings in Darwin, was conducted by the Darwin branch of the Kuomintang. After their wedding they honeymooned in China, which included visiting Charlies mother in Taishan, for a year.

On their return, they lived with Selina Hassan in Darwin and they partnered with in her tailoring business. Soon after the couple also opened their own laundry business, known as ‘Charlie Houng On and Myrtle Laundry’ and Charlie also obtained a contract to sell Malvern Star bicycles; later, in 1940, Yee was the sole agent for this contract.

Between 1930 and 1940 Yee and Charlie had four sons, Ronald, Raymond, Ken and Maurice. Their first child Ronald was delivered by local midwife Jane Elizabeth Tye and Raymond by Selina Hassan but for her youngest children she delivered by herself and returned to work within an hour; going to a doctor was not considered and she believed that 'the show must go on'.

In 1941, along with her husband and two of her brothers, Ernest and William, Yee ran and did the mixing at the Darwin Aerated Water factory until, later that year, she was evacuated from Darwin in the lead up to the Bombing of Darwin. She left with her four sons on the SS Montoro, which was the last civilian ship to leave and, afterwards, her factory was requisitioned by the army until 1946.

Yee first settled in Brisbane, where she stayed with family, until Charlie was later evacuated and they went to live together in Sydney where they operated a market garden in Botany and later opened a fish and chip shop in Glebe.

In 1946 Yee and her family were able to return to Darwin and to their factory which they ran until around 1966 when she took a year long international holiday which included visiting Europe and the United States.

In 1974, during Cyclone Tracy, Yee lost her home and many of their properties and were forced to sell much of it in order to re-establish themselves financially. During the worst of the cyclone Yee hid with her family in a bathroom for many hours and later called it ‘a nightmare … you couldn’t describe it'.

Yee died on 24 November 1997 in Darwin having survived her husband by one year.

== Oral history ==
Yee, alongside her husband, recorded an oral history with Library & Archives NT in 1981.
