= Olga Havnen =

Aboriginal leader, advocate and activist

Olga Havnen AM is an Aboriginal leader, advocate and activist in the Northern Territory of Australia. She is currently the chief executive officer of the Danila Dilba Health Service in Darwin, an Aboriginal Community Controlled Health Service.

== Early life ==
Havnen is of Western Arrente descent and grew up in Tennant Creek. Her great-grandfather was Ah Hong, a Chinese cook who worked on the Overland Telegraph Line and her great-grandmother Ranijika was a Western Arrernte woman. Their daughter Gloria, Havnen's grandmother, was the first Aboriginal woman to own a house in Alice Springs. Havnen's father was a Norwegian sailor who jumped ship in Adelaide and her mother, Pegg, lived in Tennant Creek. Havnen went to boarding school at Blackheath & Thornburgh College in Charters Towers, Queensland.

== Career ==
Havnen has held positions as the Aboriginal and Torres Strait Islander Programs Co-ordinator for the Australian Red Cross, Senior Policy Officer in the Northern Territory Government's Indigenous Policy Unit, Indigenous Programs Director with the Fred Hollows Foundation, and Executive Officer with the National Indigenous Working Group.

Havnen was the Coordinator General of Remote Service Provision from 2011 until October 2012, when the Northern Territory Government controversially abolished the position.

She released one report which detailed deficiencies in Northern Territory and Commonwealth Government’s service provision to remote communities in the Northern Territory.

She is currently the Chief Executive Officer of the Danila Dilba Health Service in Darwin, an Aboriginal Community Controlled Health Service.

Havnen gave evidence at the Royal Commission into the Protection and Detention of Children in the Northern Territory critical of the outcomes and delivery of the Northern Territory National Emergency Response, commonly referred to as the Intervention stating “the experience of the Intervention was such a debacle you’d never want that repeated, but I do think that there is a role for the federal government in here in the Northern Territory.”

She was appointed a Member of the Order of Australia in the 2025 King's Birthday Honours for "significant service to Indigenous health and advocacy".
