= Way Key =

Chinese merchant

- Traditional Chinese: 葉威記
- Simplified Chinese: 叶威记
Transcriptions
Standard Mandarin
- Hanyu Pinyin: Yè Wēijì
Yue: Cantonese
- Jyutping: jip6 wai1 gei3

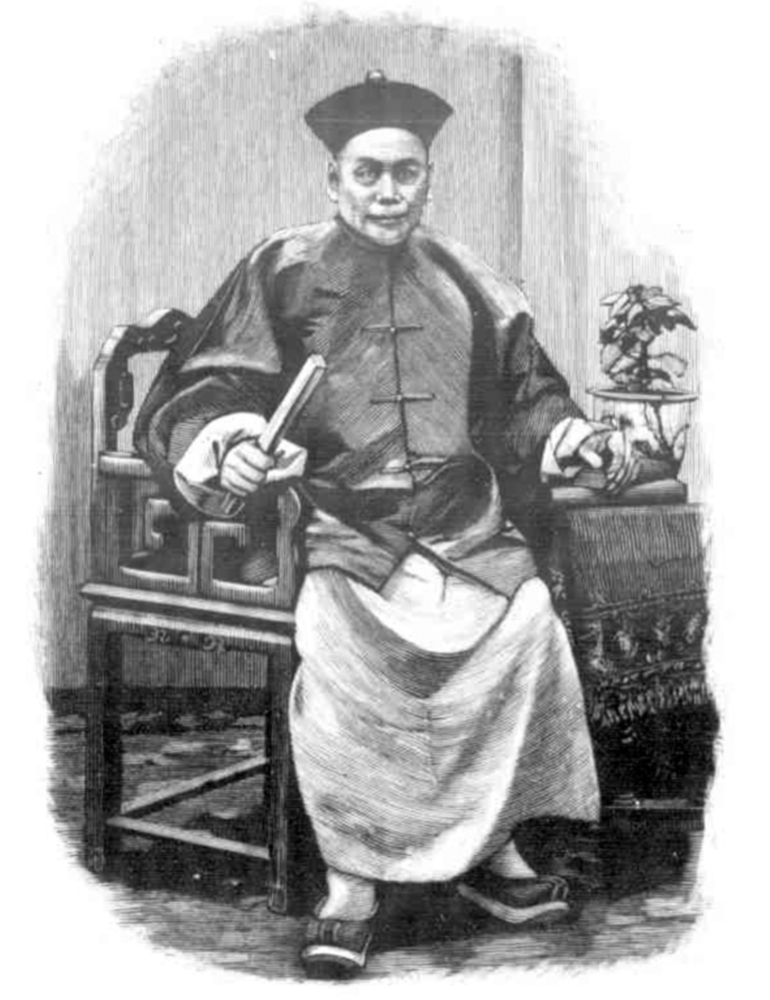
Portrait of Way Key, 17 September 1892

Way Key (Chinese: 葉威記; c. 1824 – 15 August 1892), also spelled Way Kee, was a Chinese merchant, who lived in lower George Street, Sydney, Australia.

== Background ==
Way Key was born in Guangzhou, Guangdong, to the merchant Yip Heng Cheong (葉恒昌), a.k.a. Toy Yue. Way Key's family, the Yip clan, were from King Shan village, part of Chashan in Dongguan. The Yip family's zupu can trace their origins to Taipoo (大圃) village in Henan, where the progenitor of the clan, Yip Wing Ching (葉永青), came from in the 13th-century during the Song dynasty.

As a young man he travelled to America before amassing a fortune in China and deciding to set up business in Australia around 1853.

== Business ==
After setting up business in The Rocks he had leased 164-68 Lower George Street by 1876 and from here he imported Chinese goods for sale in Australia. Although his operations were based in Sydney he also had commercial interests in many small towns across New South Wales and Queensland and owned a large business in Hong Kong.

Way Kee never spoke English and although relatively unknown to Europeans he was highly respected within the Chinese diaspora and was a persistent opponent to the opium trade in Australia. Way established successful trading relationship with Sydney-based European firms like those of Christopher Newton and Sigmond Hoffnung.

Between 1857 and 1889, Way Kee served as treasurer to the Koon Yee Tong. He was also regularly entrusted with the savings of poorer Chinese labourers and later began sponsoring their immigration, provide housing and assistance, and direct them to workplaces around the country. Way Kee returned to China on four occasions, marrying each time and bringing his wife over to Australia.

== Death ==
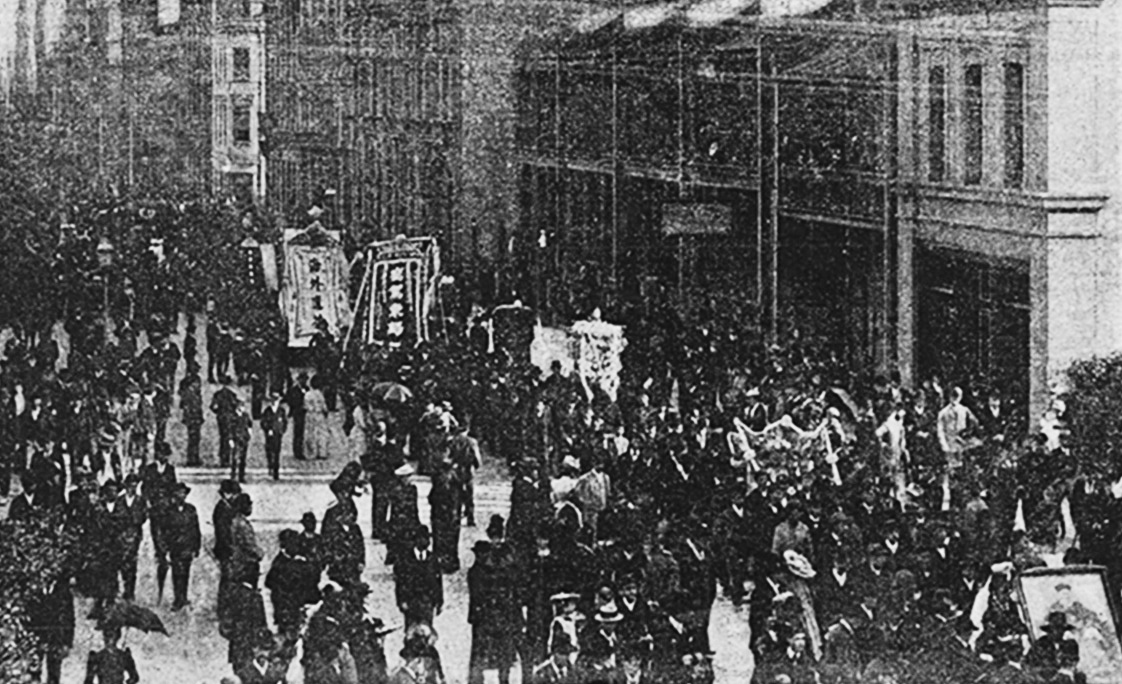
Funeral procession of Mr. Way Key, Sydney, 17 September 1892

Way Kee died of heart disease in Sydney on 15 August 1892. At the time of his death the bulk of his property in Australia was valued as being between £60,600 and £70,090, and his business was inherited by his son and grandson, L. War Mun Way Key. His nephew, Mr. Way Lee, of Adelaide, tried to see his uncle before he died but the stringent Chinese Restriction Act made this impossible.

Way Key held the rank of mandarin or the order of Gaum Shang, and his will directed that his body should be embalmed and placed in a leaden coffin, and taken to the family vault at Hong Kong. His funeral procession was the largest Chinese funeral seen in Sydney up till that time. It was arranged by fellow businessman Mei Quong Tart and started outside his business at 168 George Street before winding its way past the Town Hall and down York Street to Smith's Wharf where his remains were loaded onto SS Tsinan. His wife and family accompanied the remains back to Hong Kong. Photographs of the procession were taken by the studio of Cleeve and Co., Victoria Arcade, Sydney.
