= Gloria Ouida Lee =

Chinese-Australian miner (1908–1995)

- Born: 14 July 1908; Stuart, Australia
- Died: 13 April 1995 (aged 86)
- Other names: Siew Yoke Kwan; Gloria Purdy-Lee; Gloria Hong Lee
- Parent(s): Ah Hong, Ranjika
- Relatives: Olga Havnen (granddaughter)

Gloria Ouida Lee or Siew Yoke Kwan (née Hong), also known as Gloria Purdy-Lee (14 July 1908 – 13 April 1995) was a Chinese-Australian miner. She was the daughter of Western Arrernte woman Ranjika and Alice Springs' Chinese Market gardener Ah Hong. Lee travelled between Australia and China and experienced discrimination because of her mixed parentage. She is included in the archive collection of the Women's Museum of Australia, formerly known as the National Pioneer Women's Hall of Fame. Her oral history is held at the National Library of Australia.

== Early life ==
Lee was born in a dry creek-bed under a tree, in Stuart (what would become Alice Springs), Australia, in 1908, the youngest child of Ranijka and Ah Hong. Lee's family ran a market garden on Todd Street and their house was popular with bush men needing a "good feed" when they came to town. Both her parents had children from previous relationships/marriages.

As a child the government attempted to force Lee and her siblings Ada and Dempsey away to live at The Bungalow, an institution for Aboriginal children. Her father protected them from being taken from him by threatening to shoot the policeman who was sent to take the children. Lee would later attend school as a part of the 'European' class taught by Ida Standley in the mornings rather than with the "half-caste" children in the afternoons. Here she would receive 3 ½ hours of class time rather than the 1 ½ hours given to the children living at The Bungalow. Her brother Dempsey was considered by Standley to be exceptionally bright, and he was made head of the school; this was a decision that led to some backlash. In comparison to other Indigenous-Asian contemporaries Lee and her siblings had privileged access to schooling which showed their negotiation of hybridity and diversity.

Ranjika died in childbirth in 1914 and in 1918 Ah Hong sold his market garden and took his three children to China, to be cared for by relatives. It was a yearlong journey; the family had to first travel to Darwin by horse and buggy before taking a ship. In China she was welcomed by her father's family who, although aware her mother was Aboriginal, welcomed her with open arms and was respectful towards her. Her father spent a year in China with Lee and her siblings, and then returned to Alice Springs alone in 1920. While Lee lived in China, she went to school, learning to read and write in Cantonese, she remained in school until the age of 15 or 16. After completing her education, she helped with household duties, as was customary at the time.

== Life in Alice Springs ==
Lee decided to return to Alice Springs in 1929. Lee was the first Aboriginal woman in Alice Springs to own a house. She purchased the land herself with her earnings from mining and hospital work, and she managed and supervised the construction of her house herself and, in doing so was the first Aborignal woman to own a house in the town. This was despite racial segregation policies in place at the time and was a strong display of her independence.

She struggled to fit in with Aboriginal people who considered her Chinese while Chinese people viewed her as Aboriginal. Though both cultures valued kinship, connection to land and plural female partners there were significant differences, especially as they related to work and the accumulation of wealth and property. This likely contributed to the backlash Lee received from her intersectionality, however also built her the strength in navigating her identity between these cultures.

Lee became pregnant with the child of Englishman Fred 'Lofty' Purdy; she was rejected by her father for not marrying a Chinese man. Lee and Purdy married at the Catholic Church in Alice Springs and lived in a simple house, with dirt floors, near her father's market garden which was now located on Gap Road. They are also recorded as mining together at Hatches Creek for wolframite.

She was known as a hard-working woman miner who was also a well-educated avid reader of history, politics and culture. During her lifetime she was outspoken about social issues, and often wrote letters to the editor of the local newspapers; including the Centralian Advocate.

Lee and Purdy had four daughters together in the 1930s–1940s: Valencia, Olive, Peg and Joyce, all of whom attended school at Our Lady of Sacred Heart Convent School.

When her father died in 1952, she was his only surviving child. In 1953, after the breakup of her marriage, Lee moved to Brisbane where she eventually married William Lee, a Chinese man who she later divorced from.

Following her death in 1995, Lee was buried in Alice Springs.

== Legacy ==
The Gloria Lee Ngale Environmental Learning Centre in Alice Springs was named for Lee by her daughter Olive Veverbrants. The purpose of the centre is to provide Indigenous people with the knowledge and technologies for creating sustainable food production and healthy lifestyles. The centre was built using sustainable architectural design practices. It is powered completely on solar energy, uses composting toilets, and a grey water system for watering the food gardens.

At the centre, Indigenous communities in Alice Springs receive knowledge and technology for food production and lifestyles, and this work illustrates Lee's influence.

Many of Lee's descendants live in around the Northern Territory and Alice Springs. Lee is the grandmother of Olga Havnen, an Aboriginal activist and leader. Havnen cites her grandmother as an inspiration for her advocacy.

== Oral history ==
Lee's oral history was tape-recorded as part of a project for the National Library of Australia documenting the lives of Chinese Australians. The oral history was published in the form of an interview in the book, Astronauts, Lost Souls & Dragons: Voices of Today's Chinese Australians.

Giese’s research directly quotes the discrimination Lee faced navigating her intersectionality as an Indigenous and Chinese woman moving back to Australia in 1929. Lee recalled having felt “queer [like she] wasn’t accepted by anybody" and that she had had been treated “a different person” by the Arrernte and Chinese communities around her.
