= Robogals =

Australian student-run organisation

- Founded: 14 July 2008
- Type: Non-profit organisation
- Location(s): Parkville, Melbourne, Victoria, Australia
- Coordinates: 37.7985°S 144.9618°E
- Region served: Australia, Canada, Japan, United Kingdom, United States, South Africa, Philippines, New Zealand
- Members: 4,713
- Key people: Marita Cheng, founder Mark Parncutt, co-founder Ellen Connor, chair Janaki Saba, CEO
- Website: robogals.org

Robogals is an international student-run organisation that aims to inspire, engage and empower young women to consider studying engineering and related fields. Its primary activity is interactive, engineering based workshops for girls aged between 8-18 (depending on location). Robogals has chapters at 25 universities across the world including Australia, Canada, the United Kingdom, the United States, Japan, Kenya, South Africa, New Zealand, Indonesia and the Philippines. These chapters fall into three regions - Robogals Asia Pacific, Robogals EMEA (Europe, Middle East, & Africa), and Robogals North America.

Robogals also run a range of other activities around this central theme. Past events have included a robotics competition (2008), a mass robot dance that attracted significant media coverage (2009), a robot artwork exhibition, science fair (2010), the Robogals Science Challenge (2012-), and the Robogals Challenge in the UK (2015-).

The organisation is predominately run by university student volunteers, including at the global headquarters in Melbourne, Australia with the Leadership Team of Robogals based around the world.

Robogals' achievements have been recognised on an international level with the awarding of an Anita Borg Change Agent Award by the Anita Borg Institute for Women and Technology. Robogals founder Marita Cheng was named the 2012 Young Australian of the Year.

== History ==
Robogals was founded as a student club at the University of Melbourne in July 2008 by mechatronics engineering undergraduate student Marita Cheng, together with software engineering student Mark Parncutt and three other engineering and science students, Kelly Chiu, Ann Chee Lim and Vi Vu. The idea initially came from efforts by one of Cheng's professors, Jamie Evans, to teach robotics at Lauriston Girls' School as a way to encourage more girls to study engineering.

Following its initial successes in Melbourne, the organisation was expanded throughout Australia in 2009 by inviting female engineering students from four more universities around Australia to a three-day "Bootcamp" at the University of Melbourne where they learned how to run a Robogals chapter back at their home university. It is also helpful if the students have support from their faculty for establishing a Robogals chapter on their campus.

== Activities ==
=== Engineering workshops ===
Robogals' primary activity is running engineering based workshops, either in schools or by having the schools visit the uni; the workshops are aim to inspire gender diversity in engineering by engaging girls and guys in a range engineering topics. These topics are selected by the volunteers running the sessions to reflect their own interest in the field. Robogals volunteers are university students, including male and female, who teach school girls the basics of engineering; an example of this is through the use of robotics and programming using LEGO Mindstorms EV3 and NXT kits. Lessons can range between 1 hour to a full day and can consist of multiple types of workshops.the robot to move, use the sensors and perform specific tasks.

The workshops are run by the local university chapter, which liaises with schools to arrange visits, and arranges for trained volunteers to run the workshops.

=== Community events ===
Robogals Melbourne held a Science and Engineering Expo in August 2010, partnered with National Science Week, attended by girls schools and a few individual families. In 2010, Robogals Perth went on an excursion to Kalgoorlie to demonstrate to school students as part of the seventh annual Science Awareness Festival by Scitech. In March 2011, Robogals London had a stall at the Big Bang Fair.

In 2009, Robogals' Guinness World Record attempt for the 'largest robot dance' received coverage on national television. Over 300 dancers/students turned up at the event on 29 September 2009 at the University of Melbourne.

The Robots Are Coming was an exhibition built by art and design students, held from 6–11 September 2010 of 5 life-size robots at a transportation hub in central Sydney. The event functioned as street art, inviting pedestrians to reflect on 'the impact of technology in today's society'. Over hundreds of thousands of pedestrians had lunch alongside the robots, or stopped to admire them.

2015 also saw the Robogals EMEA region join the BBC Tour across the UK

=== SINE ===
The annual conference in each region, known as a SINE (Seminars Inducting New Executive-committees) brings together the organisation's executive committee members in a region, focussing mainly on training the new committee members; it is the primary means of expanding Robogals to new universities. The meetings during the early Robogals expansion stages (in 2009 and early 2010) were called "Bootcamps", but since late 2010 have been called SINEs.

Past conferences have included:

- Robogals Bootcamp, 29 September – 1 October 2009, University of Melbourne, Melbourne, Australia
- Robogals Bootcamp UK, 24–25 April 2010, Imperial College London, London, England
- Robogals Australia & NZ SINE 2010, 10–12 September 2010, University of New South Wales, Sydney, Australia
- Robogals UK & Europe SINE 2011, 11–13 February 2011, University of Manchester, Manchester, England
- Robogals Australia & NZ SINE 2011, 24–26 September 2011, University of Adelaide, Adelaide, Australia
- Robogals UK & Europe SINE 2012, 28–29 January 2012, University of Bristol, Bristol, England
- Robogals North America SINE 2012, 25–27 February 2012, California Institute of Technology, Pasadena, California, USA
- Robogals Asia Pacific SINE 2012, 22–24 September 2012, University of Queensland, Brisbane, Australia
- Robogals UK & Europe SINE 2013, 9–10 February 2013, University of Manchester, Manchester, England
- Robogals North America SINE 2013 (West Coast), 2–3 March 2013, California Institute of Technology, Pasadena, California, USA
- Robogals North America SINE 2013 (East Coast), 2–3 March 2013, Columbia University, New York, NY, USA
- Robogals Asia Pacific SINE 2013, 28–30 September 2013, Australian National University, Canberra, Australia
- Robogals North America SINE 2014 (West Coast), 18–20 January 2014, University of Arizona, Tucson, Arizona, USA
- Robogals North America SINE 2014 (East Coast), 18–20 January 2014, York University, Toronto, Canada
- Robogals UK & Europe SINE 2014, 8–10 February 2014, Electronics and Computer Science, University of Southampton, Southampton, England
- Robogals Asia Pacific SINE 2014, 27–29 September 2014, University of Western Australia, Perth, Australia
- Robogals North America SINE 2015, 17–19 January 2015, Georgia Institute of Technology, Atlanta, Georgia
- Robogals UK & Europe SINE 2015, 7–9 February 2015, Loughborough University, Loughborough, England
- Robogals Asia Pacific SINE 2015, 26–28 September 2015, Broken Bay (hosted by Robogals Newcastle) Broken Bay, New South Wales, Australia
- Robogals North America SINE 2016, 16–18 January 2016, Columbia University, New York, USA
- Robogals EMEA SINE 2016, 7–9 February 2016, University of Cambridge, Cambridge, England
- Robogals Asia Pacific SINE 2016, 24–26 September 2016, University of Melbourne, Melbourne, Australia
- Robogals North America SINE 2017, 14–16 January 2017, California Institute of Technology, Pasadena, California, USA
- Robogals EMEA SINE 2017, February 2017, 10–12 February 2017, Imperial College London, London, England
- Robogals Asia Pacific SINE 2017, 23–25 September 2017, University of New South Wales, Sydney, Australia
- Robogals EMEA SINE 2018, 10–12 February 2018, University of Aberdeen, Aberdeen, Scotland
- Robogals NA SINE 2018, Robogals AP SINE 2018

== Organisational structure ==
Robogals Global (incorporated as Robogals Ltd), based in Melbourne, Australia, is the parent body of the chapters. It was created to oversee and mentor all the chapters of Robogals, and to facilitate worldwide expansion plans. Robogals is divided into regions, each with several chapters. The chapters operate as independent student clubs, with some degree of autonomy in deciding what activities to pursue, but must at the very least offer the core engineering workshop program in schools.

Robogals Asia Pacific (APAC), with chapters historically and currently at Australian National University, Tokyo Institute of Technology, University of Adelaide, University of Melbourne, University of New South Wales, University of Newcastle, University of Queensland, University of Southern Queensland, University of Western Australia, University of Tasmania, Xavier University - Ateneo de Cagayan and Monash University.

Robogals Europe, Middle East and Africa (EMEA), formerly, UK & Europe, with chapters historically and currently at Imperial College London, University of Nairobi, Loughborough University, University of Bristol, University of Cambridge, University of Exeter, University of Manchester, University of Southampton, University of St Andrews, University of Sussex, University of Leeds and University of Cape Town.

Robogals North America, with chapters historically and currently at California Institute of Technology, Columbia University, Queen's University, York University, Georgia Institute of Technology, University of Toronto and Wellesley College.

== Key people ==
The founders of Robogals are Marita Cheng and Mark Parncutt; they also held the positions of Executive Director and Operations Director respectively until the end of 2012.

Since the founders' departure from day-to-day roles, Robogals has been led as CEO by Nicole Brown (2013-2016), Ami Pasricha (2017-2020), Morgan Marshall (2020-2022), Janelle Dixon (2022-2024) and Janaki Saba (2025- present).
