= Liangchi Zhang =

Australian mechanical engineer

Liangchi Zhang (Chinese: 章亮炽; born July 1958) is a Scientia Professor from the School of Mechanical and Manufacturing Engineering at the University of New South Wales. He was a professor of Mechanical Engineering and the director of the Graduate School of Engineering, University of Sydney, Australia, and a Chair Professor in the Department of Mechanics and Aerospace Engineering, Southern University of Science and Technology (SUSTech), Shenzhen, China.

Zhang has carried out research on both the fundamentals and industrial applications in the cross-disciplinary fields of:

- Precision manufacturing
- Biomanufacturing
- Nanotechnology
- Characterisation of advanced materials
- Tribology
- Solid mechanics
- Computational mechanics

== Biography ==
Zhang was born in Huangyan District, Taizhou, Zhejiang Province, China in July 1958. He earned a BS in 1982 and ME in 1985 both from Zhejiang University in Hangzhou. He obtained a PhD in 1988 from Peking University in Beijing. From 1989 to 1991, Zhang did postdoctoral research at the University of Cambridge in UK. From 1991 to 1992, he was a research fellow in the Mechanical Engineering Laboratory of MITI in Japan. Zhang received an honorary Doctor of Engineering in 2005 from the University of Sydney.

Zhang was the chairman of the 6th Asia-Pacific Symposium on Engineering Plasticity and Its Applications in Sydney in 2002 (AEPA2002), chairman of the 3rd Australasian Congress on Applied Mechanics in Sydney in 2002 (ACAM2002), and chairman of the 1st International Symposium on Advances in Abrasive Technology in Sydney in 1997 (ISAAT'97). He is the editor-in chief of the International Journal of Surface Science and Engineering.

He was elected a fellow of Australian Academy of Technological Sciences and Engineering in 2006.
