= Liang Xiao Ping =

Australian artist

Liang Xiao Ping (Chinese: 梁小萍; born 1959), a pioneer in Australian Chinese calligrapher, also an artist, poet and scholar, is the first Chinese Australian artist to exhibit at Parliament House, Canberra. She was born in Guangzhou, China and migrated to Sydney in 1987.

Liang is the founding president of the Australian Oriental Calligraphy Society. The series of her artwork and poetry was presented to 2008 Beijing Olympic Games as a national gift by the Australian Olympic Committee, it is currently housed in National Sports Museum of China. Her artwork 'Rainbow' was collected by the Parliament House of NSW. Her work 'Prajna-Paramita' (Xin Sutra) was collected by the Art Gallery of New South Wales. Her solo exhibition was held by the China National Association of Calligraphers at the National Art Museum of China in Beijing. She was invited by universities such as Stanford University, University of New South Wales and Sydney Conservatorium of Music to have her solo exhibition, academic activities and onsite demonstration.

== Major art activities ==
Year	Art Activity	Venue
2014	LIANG Xiao Ping · Poetry and Calligraphy, Art and Expression – Soaring to the Sky In celebration of Australian Citizenship Day 2014 and the 50th anniversary of Liang Xiao Ping's dedication to calligraphy Exhibition officiated by the Honourable Philip Ruddock MP Opening addresses: the Honourable Tony Abbott MP, Prime Minister of Australia and Senator the Honourable George Brandis representative: Senator the Honourable Concetta Fierravanti-Wells; Ma Zhaoxu, Chinese Ambassador to Australia and Hans Hendrischke, Professor of Chinese Business and Management, and chair of the executive committee of the China Studies Centre at the University of Sydney.	Great Hall, Parliament House, Canberra
2014	LIANG Xiao Ping · Poetry and Calligraphy, Art and Expression – Theme and Variations Exhibition officiated by Li Huaxin, Consul General of the P.R.C. in Sydney	The Concourse, Civic Pavilion, Chatswood, Sydney
2012	LIANG Xiao Ping · Poetry and Calligraphy, Art and Expression – Splashes of Ink – Tour de Hong Kong Exhibition supported by Australian Consulate-General in Hong Kong Officiated by Paul Tighe, Australian Consul-General in Hong Kong	Hong Kong City Hall, Hong Kong
2011	Opening Ceremony – Collection of LIANG Xiao Ping's Art Piece: Clouds and Mountains, a Palindromic Poem Opening ceremony addresses: Dr Michael Spence, The University of Sydney Vice-Chancellor and Principal and Professor Kim Walker, Dean of Sydney Conservatorium of Music	Sydney Conservatorium of Music, Sydney
2010	A. International symposium The Art of LIANG Xiao Ping and Her Philosophy and Thoughts; B. Exhibition Melody of Lines – the Brush of LIANG Xiao Ping; C. Onsite demonstration of Chinese calligraphy Co-presented by the University of Sydney Confucius Institute and Sydney Conservatorium of Music	Sydney Conservatorium of Music, Sydney
2008	Presentation of Paean to the Beijing Olympiad – Palindromic poems and their expression in Chinese calligraphy by LIANG Xiao Ping, a gift to the 2008 Chinese Olympic Committee presented by the Australian Olympic Committee Hosted by the Chinese Olympic Committee Opening ceremony addresses: Graham Fletcher, Australian Embassy in China on behalf of the Honourable Kevin Rudd MP Prime minister of Australia, LIU Peng, President of Chinese Olympic Committee, John Coates, President of Australian Olympic Committee	Chinese Olympic Committee Headquarters, Beijing
2008	Exhibition Homage to the Olympic Spirit – the Original Scripts of Olympic Gift, Paean to the Beijing Olympiad – Palindromic Poems and their Expression in Chinese Calligraphy by LIANG Xiao Ping	The Parliament House of NSW, Sydney
2007	Unveiling of Parliament's New Art Acquisition of Chinese Calligraphy 'Rainbow' by LIANG Xiao Ping Hosted by the Legislative Council and the Legislative Assembly of the NSW Parliament Officiated by the Honourable Dr Meredith Burgmann, President of the NSW Legislative Council and the Honourable John Aquilina, the Leader of the NSW Legislative Assembly, attended by the Honourable Sir Laurence Street, former Chief Justice of the Supreme Court of NSW and Qiu Shaofang, Chinese Consul-General in Sydney.	The Parliament House of NSW, Sydney
2004	Tribute to the brush – An Exhibition of Chinese Calligraphy by LIANG Xiao Ping & Her Students Celebrating the 40th Anniversary of her dedication to calligraphy Officiated by Edmund Capon, Director of the Art Gallery of NSW	The Parliament House of NSW, Sydney
1999	Spirit of the New Millennium – Chinese Calligraphy, the Brush of Liang Xiao Ping Officiated by Edmund Capon, Director of the Art Gallery of NSW	Quadrivium Art Gallery, Queen Victoria Building, Sydney
1998	A. Exhibition Enlightenment – Chinese Calligraphy: The Brush of LIANG Xiao ping B. Symposium the Art of Chinese Calligraphy of LIANG Xiao Ping Hosted by the China Calligraphers' Association (China)	National Art Museum of China, Beijing
1996	A. Exhibition Chasing Time and Light: The Brush of LIANG Xiao ping B. Lecture on Chinese Calligraphy, a Key to the Understanding of China; C. Onsite demonstration of Chinese calligraphy Hosted by the Stanford University, USA	Stanford University, USA

== Other academic work ==
- Founded the accredited course of Chinese calligraphy for the Department of Chinese Studies, University of New South Wales
- Founded the course of Chinese brush art for the University of New South Wales College of Fine Arts
- Chief Judge of the First, 3rd, 4th, 5th Annual Australian Oriental Calligraphy Competition in 1992, 1994, 1995, 1996

Lectures and Demonstrations

- 2000 Founder and Principal of Academy of Chinese Calligraphy, Sydney
- 1995 Art Gallery of NSW, Sydney
- 1995 Brett Whiteley Studio, Sydney
- 1995 Produced and presented multicultural art program series on SBS radio station, Sydney

== Signature artworks ==
- Soaring to the Sky

Contemporary calligraphy written on canvas, using acrylic paint. Size: 1.2 m × 1.5 m × 4 pieces

- The Thousand Characters Classic

A Thousand Characters Classic written by Liang Xiao Ping that consists of 88 scrolls (xuan paper mounted on silk scroll) in 21 different styles. Size: 1.35 m × 0.35 m × 88 pieces

- Endless Joy

Contemporary calligraphy with palindromic couplets written on canvas, using acrylic paint. Size: 1.2 m × 10.5 m

- Prajnaparamita Heart Sutra

This artwork consists of Prajnaparamita written in five styles on xuan paper mounted on silk scrolls. They have been displayed in various exhibitions of Liang Xiao Ping's, including those held in China National Gallery (Beijing, 1998), Hong Kong City Hall (2001), Parliament House of NSW (2004) and Sydney Conservatorium of Music (2010). Size: 5 m × 1.8 m × 5 pieces

- Poetic Fascination

Three palindromic poem written in the seal script on xuan paper mounted in perspex sheet. They can be viewed both from front and back. This allows each single artwork to have four different narrations. Size: 1.35 m × 0.65 m × 3 pieces

- Eternity

Contemporary calligraphy with palindromic couplets in oracle and cursive scripts, written on canvas using acrylic paint. Size: 1 m × 1.5 m × 4 pieces

- Theme and Variations

Consists of 12 canvases that showcases the elegant morphology of a single art form. This art form can be viewed in three ways:
a. In unison. Size: 2.3 m × 6.1 m × 1 piece
b. As two separate entities where the top rows reflects the contemporary style and the bottom rows represent the traditional long horizontal scrolls. Size: Top 1 m × 6.1 m & Bottom 0.76 m × 6.1 m
c. Each canvas as each individual characters with palindromic effects. This exhibit consists of 6 canvasses of 1.5 m × 1 m and 6 canvasses of 0.6 m × 1 m.

- Paean to the Beijing Olympiad palindromic poems and their expression in Chinese calligraphy

The originals of the gift to the Chinese Olympic Committee, presented by the Australian Olympic Committee on behalf of the Australian people in 2008. Size: 1.4 m × 0.7 m × 32 pieces

== Bibliography ==
- 2014, Liang Xiao Ping's History of Chinese Writing Series – Chinese Calligraphy The Thousand Character Classic Vol. 1 Cursive Script of Liang Xiao Ping's Style
- 2014, Liang Xiao Ping's History of Chinese Writing Series – Chinese Calligraphy The Thousand Character Classic Vol. 2 Bamboo Script of Liang Xiao Ping's Style
- 2012, LIANG Xiao Ping • Poetry and Calligraphy • Art and Expression: Splashes of Ink – Tour de Hong Kong (in English and Chinese) ISBN 978-988-15827-1-3
- 2008, Paean to the Beijing Olympiad - A Gift to the 2008 Chinese Olympic Committee presented by the Australian Olympic Committee on behalf of the Australian People - Palindromic Poems and their expression in Chinese Calligraphy by LIANG Xiao Ping (in Chinese, English and French)
- 2008, Homage to the Olympic Spirit – The art of Calligraphy by Liang Xiao Ping & Her Student (in Chinese)
- 1999, Flowers of Wisdom – Liang Xiao Ping Heart Sutra in Five Scripts (in English, Chinese, Japanese and Korean)
- 1999, Chinese Calligraphy – as developed by Liang Xiao Ping (English)

Textbook developed for Chinese calligraphy course in University of New South Wales

- 1997, Sayings From Beyond – Chinese Calligraphy in the Brush of Liang Xiao Ping (in English and Chinese)
