= Sarah Hang Gong =

Australian businesswoman and midwife (1844–1911)

Sarah Hang Gong née Bowman (23 April 1844 – 6 April 1911) was an interpreter, midwife and Chinese community leader and businesswoman who lived much of her life in Darwin, Northern Territory.

== Early life ==
Hang Gong was born in London to Thomas and Sarah Bowman and, as a family and with at least one sister (Elizabeth), they immigrated to Australia in around 1861. Before this Hang Gong had qualified as a midwife at Guy's Hospital. In Australia they settled in the Creswick area in Victoria where her father worker as a brewer.

Shortly after the family settled in Creswick Hang Gong developed a relationship with Lee Hang Gong, a Chinese merchant, who was involved in the nearby goldfields. When Hang Gong was 20, on 30 November 1864, she gave birth to their first child Thomas George who was followed by Arthur Edward in January 1867. More children followed with Jane Elizabeth in July 1869, Selina (Cissy/Cissie) a few years later, Herbert Doral in 1876 and Ernest Howard Lee in 1878 (who was born while they were travelling to Hong Kong). It is unclear whether the pair ever married legally but they lived together from at least 1867 and Hang Gong practised as a nurse and midwife during this time.

Her sister Elizabeth also partnered with and married a Chinese merchant, a butcher, Lee Long Hearng in 1873; she was 18 and he was 40.

== Life in the Northern Territory ==
Likely lured by a mining boom in the Northern Territory the family relocated to Darwin where Hang Gong's husband started a business in Southport as well as entering into partnership in a grocery business in Darwin's Chinatown on Cavenagh Street with Chim Yan Yan. Hang Gong immediately begun practicing as a midwife here and, in February 1881, registered the birth of her first assisted delivery there to stonemason Alfred Spurgin and his wife Emma

Also in 1881 Hang Gong petitioned Edward William Price, the then Government Resident, for two of her sons (who were then 15 and 18) to be given work as court interpreters. This request does not appear to have been granted immediately but, by May 1884, Arthur had joined the police force and was often mentioned in court cases as the interpreter for Chinese people appearing in court. Hang Gong also appeared in court as a translator and, in one instance, was granted permission to appear in her husbands stead regarding a property dispute because he could not speak English.

When her husband died in 1892 Hang Gong continued to work as a midwife and nurse.

When Thomas, her first born son, died in 1902 she wrote to the Northern Territory Times to correct their description of him as being Chinese and stated that her son was a "native of the colony of Victoria and a British subject" and that, in describing him as Chinese, an error had been committed which had caused her and her family much pain.

In 1904 Alex Dowker, who had recently visited the Northern Territory, published articles in the North Queensland Register regarding the Hang Gong families fortunes, and their success in tin mining. In description of Hang Gong he wrote:

Mrs Hang Gong is also very much in evidence; she is stout, hale and hearty, and converses celestially as readily as in her mother tongue; the Chinese Amban or the Dalai Lama are not in it in Thibet [Tibet] compared with Mrs Hang Gong in Palmerston.

— Alex Dowker, as quoted in 'The Port Darwin tin mining field: interview with Mr Dowker, 14 November 1904

From around 1910 Hang Gong lived with Emiline Lee Hang Gong, the widowed wife of her son Arthur Edward Lee Hang Gong, and they lived together on Cavanagh Street where Emiline ran a small store selling sold tripe soup, snacks and soft drinks. Her granddaughter Selina Hassan cared for her. Hassan recalled often having to stay home from school to care for her grandmother and cleaning out her clay pipe.

Hang Gong died on 6 April 1911 of alcoholism and associated illness.

== Legacy ==
Hang Gong Avenue in Driver (Palmerston) is named for Hang Gong and her family.
