= Edward Pretty =

Australian businessman and lawyer

Edward (Ted) Pretty (born 1957, Darwin, NT, Australia), is an Australian businessman and lawyer.

He is the current chairman of Sustainable Metal Cloud (SMC) and Firmus, two companies leading the transformation in AI infrastructure and sustainable GPU solutions.

== Education ==
Pretty obtained a Bachelor's Degree in Arts (Economics) and First Class Honors Degree in Law.

== Career ==
=== Early career ===
Pretty was a Partner at the Media and Telecommunications Law Firm, Gilbert & Tobin. From there, he moved to Optus, serving as an adviser and director of Optus Communications and Optus Vision.

=== Telstra ===
In October 1997 Pretty was appointed managing director of Australia's public and largest telecommunications company Telstra.

During his time at Telstra, Pretty served in a number of roles, including head of Telstra's Convergent Business Group, and the head of Telstra Retail. In 2003 he became group managing director of the Telstra Technology, Innovation and Products Group.

During his tenure at Telstra, Pretty oversaw the entry and early steps of the company in its internet and online business, before resigning from Telstra in 2005.

=== Macquarie group ===
In 2006, Pretty became a consultant at the Macquarie Group and continued on with the company, becoming executive director of Macquarie Capital. He was instrumental in Macquarie's bid to build the National Broadband Network.

=== Gulf finance house ===
Pretty joined Gulf Finance House as CEO of Investment Capital. In December 2009, was appointed group chief executive officer.

=== Hills Limited ===
On 3 September 2012, Pretty was confirmed as the group managing director of Hills Limited. In association with a major restructure of the company Pretty oversaw its transformation.

With a number of South Australian universities, the SA Government and Premier Jay Weatherill, Pretty established two centres in Adelaide to foster innovation and support start-up companies.

On 27 May 2015, Pretty resigned from his position as group managing director and chief executive officer.

=== Covata and Cipherpoint Limited ===
On 23 December 2016, Pretty was confirmed as managing director and CEO of Covata Limited. Later on, Covata was renamed to Cipherpoint Limited and altered its governance structure. Pretty then moved to part-time executive chair.

=== Directorships ===
Pretty was a director of ASX listed NextDC Limited and was advisory chairman, Australia and New Zealand, of Indian IT company Tech Mahindra Group.

He was chairman and on the Board of ASX listed RP Data Limited for 8 years. He was chairman of Fujitsu Australia and NZ.

=== Investments ===
Pretty is a co-investor, shareholder and director of Bevan Slattery's undersea cable company, SubPartners.

=== Australian Governmental Advisory Roles ===
Pretty is on The Ministerial Advisory Council on Communications for the Honorable Malcolm Turnbull MP, then Minister for Communications.

He advised on the "E-commerce expert group" set up by the then Minister for Financial Services and Regulation, the Honorable Joe Hockey and served as one of the "Members of Foreign Affairs, Trade and Cultural Councils"

=== Firmus and Sustainable Metal Cloud (SMC) ===
In February 2022, Pretty was appointed Chairman of Firmus, the world's first scaled immersion-cooling platform. In May 2023, he was appointed chairman of Sustainable Metal Cloud (SMC), the world's most energy efficient GPU cloud.

As chairman, Pretty oversees two cutting-edge companies that provide AI infrastructure and super-compute solutions using liquid immersion and advanced technologies.
