= Charlie Houng On Yee =

Chinese-Australian businessman (1905–1996)

Charlie Houng On Yee (餘洪安). also known as Charlie Yee (7 July 1905 – 24 January 1996), was a Chinese-Australian man who worked as a tailor, gardener and businessman in Darwin, Northern Territory.

He was a resident of Darwin during the Bombing of Darwin and was subsequently evacuated from there for the remainder of World War II and, on his return, became a very involved member of the Chinese community. He would later lose his home in Cyclone Tracy.

== Life in the Northern Territory ==
Houng On Yee was born in Darwin and was the third of four sons to Yee Hang Pew and his unnamed wife. The couple had migrated to Darwin some years before from China and, in Darwin, Hang Pew had become a well-known herbalist and operated herbalist businesses in Darwin, Sydney and Melbourne. At the age of five, Yee was sent to China for his education and did not return until 1923, when he was eighteen.

When Yee returned to Darwin he became an apprentice tailor at Toy Sing Loong and Company where he worked as an indentured worker, over the 3 years he worked there he received a total amount of £80 for this period. This meant that, while there, he made all of his own clothes and shoes as he could not afford to buy any.

On 12 May 1930 he married Myrtle Fong, who became Myrtle Houng On Yee, and their wedding was celebrated by 90 guests at the Kuo Ming Tang buildings in Darwin's Chinatown, on Cavenagh Street. After the wedding they honeymooned in China for a year. On their return they lived with Selina Hassan. Yee returned to work as a tailor but soon obtained a contract to sell Malvern Star bicycles, and he and Myrtle established a laundry business. This laundry business predominately served army and bank personnel and government workers. This was hard and hot work as they used copper boilers, scrubbed the clothes by hand and ironed with wood-heated irons. Despite this they struggled to make money.

In later years they entered into a partnership with two of Myrtle's brothers, Ernest and William Fong, and operated the Darwin Aerated Waters soft drink factory which continued until the outbreak of World War II when the factory was taken over by the Army. It was returned to them after the war.

During the war Myrtle and their four sons (Ron, Raymond, Ken and Maurice) where evacuated to Brisbane where they stayed with family and then Sydney. Yee stayed in Darwin as he was an able-bodied man and expected to remain. During the Bombing of Darwin, on 19 February 1942, he was riding his bike down the Stokes Hill Wharf and, as a keen amateur photographer, was able to photograph the impact. He was also able to help remove a woman from rubble and later, in the chaos, his bicycle and camera where stolen.

After the bombing Yee was also evacuated from Darwin and travelled, via his own truck, to Adelaide River where it was then confiscated for the war effort. He was eventually able to meet his family in Sydney. There he worked for the shipping firm James Patrick and Co and also as a chauffeur. The wages were very low so the family moved to a 2 hectares (4.9 acres) block of land in Botany, with two friends, where they established a market garden. Later they purchased a fish and chip shop in Glebe. Here his sons helped him hand-peel buckets of potatoes before and after school.

In 1946 the family returned to Darwin when Darwin Aerated Waters was returned to them and, in 1966, they travelled for a year to many places. Yee become involved in many aspects of Darwin's community life including being a member, and at one point vice president, of the Chung Wah Society. He was also a drummer for Darwin's Lion Dance troupe and had a dedicated seat at the Star Theatre as a regular moviegoer.

In 1974 Yee and his family lost their home, in the northern suburbs of Darwin, during Cyclone Tracy.

Yee died on 24 January 1996.

== Oral history ==
Yee, alongside his wife, recorded an oral history with Library & Archives NT in 1981.
