= Yen Ching-hwang =

Chinese Australian historian

Yen Ching-hwang (Chinese: 顏清湟) (born 1937) is a historian of China who has spent most of his life in Australia and is an Emeritus Professor at the University of Adelaide.

Born in Yongchun, he emigrated with his family in 1947 to Pahang. In 1951, he went to Confucian Secondary School in Kuala Lumpur. He was admitted to the History department of Nanyang University in 1957. After graduating he taught high school at Batu Pahat before receiving a scholarship to study at the Australian National University. Upon graduating in 1968, he began to teach at the University of Adelaide.

Yen is best known for his works on Overseas Chinese history, including "The overseas Chinese and the 1911 revolution" (1976), "Coolies and mandarins: China's protection of overseas Chinese during the late Ch’ing period (1851–1911)" (1985) and "A social history of the Chinese in Singapore and Malaya: 1800–1911".
