= Chin Kaw =

Chinese Australian storekeeper and philanthropist

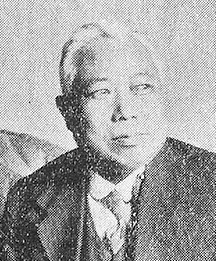
- Chin Kaw
- Born: 17 July 1865; Shui-hu, Guangdong, China
- Died: 11 April 1922 (aged 56); Hawthorn, Victoria, Australia
- Occupation(s): Chinese-Australian storekeeper and mining entrepreneur

Chin Kaw, also known as Ah Kaw or Ah Caw (17 July 1865 – 11 April 1922), was a prominent Chinese Australian storekeeper, philanthropist, and mining entrepreneur in Launceston, Tasmania, Australia, who recruited workers from China for the Tasmanian tin-mining industry and thereby helped Chinese immigrants settle in Australia.

== Early life ==
Ah Kaw was born in Shui-hu village, Kaiping district, Taishan county, Guangdong province, China. His father, Chin Lang Lan, was a merchant. He came to Australia in 1877. Around 1879, he arrived at the Chinese tin-mining community of Thomas's Plains, near Weldborough in north-eastern Tasmania, where his uncle Chin Ah Heang owned a general grocery and herb store. He worked in his uncle's store and later took up mineral leases in the area.

As Tasmania had far less stringent restrictions upon Chinese immigration than other Australian colonies and had less discriminatory attitudes than other colonies, Chin Kaw organised the passage of Chinese labourers who then worked under the tribute system on the tin fields to repay their debts, and those who were naturalised as British subjects in Tasmania were then free to move to other colonies.

== Business Interests ==
Ah Kaw moved to Launceston around 1890. He was a co-founder in the early 1890s (and eventually sole proprietor) of Sun Hung Ack & Co. in Launceston, which served as a meeting point for the local Chinese community, and pioneered the sale of Tasmanian-grown tobacco.

Ah Kaw was also a participant in many mining ventures in Tasmania as an investor, and was a founding shareholder of the National Bank of Tasmania. Along with future Senator Thomas Bakhap and several other prominent Launceston Chinese merchants, Chin Kaw was in the welcome committee which welcomed the Imperial Chinese Commissioner to Launceston in 1906.

== Legal Matters ==
Chin Kaw had numerous interactions with the legal system in Tasmania. While many of these cases were due to him launching civil actions to recover bad debts, and several burglaries of his shop, he was himself prosecuted several times.

In 1884, a police officer witnessed him selling sly gin whilst working in his uncle's store. Despite the policeman's seizure of the liquor being thwarted by a group of angry Chinese, Chin Kaw was convicted and fined £20 in lieu of three months imprisonment. Chin Kaw paid the fine, which was about six months' salary.

Another attempt to prosecute him and three others in 1889 for selling sly grog came to naught when the charge against him was withdrawn and Gee Ah Gouie, the Crown's main witness, proved so unconvincing that he was arrested for perjury at the end of the trial, and was subsequently convicted.

In 1894, Chin Kaw, along with his employee Chin Kit, was prosecuted for passing counterfeit shilling coins, and possessing the same in the till of his Launceston store, but both were acquitted as there was no evidence Chin Kaw or Chin Kit knowingly sought to pass counterfeit coins.

In 1902, Chin Kaw's store was raided by police, who found a group of 25 Chinese sitting at tables with dominoes and money on them, and observed Chin Kaw attempting to sweep the money onto the ground. Despite one of his co-accused suggesting to the court that their activities were more desirable than English larrikinism, Chin Kaw was subsequently convicted and fined £10 for allowing his premises to be used for unlawful gambling.

In 1907, the police raided Chin Kaw's store again and arrested 16 Chinese including Chin Kaw, again charging him with allowing his premises to be used for unlawful gambling. The raid was based on a tip-off made from within the Chinese community. The defence argued that the nature of the gathering was no different to the private bridge parties held by white residents of Launceston. The police did not find evidence of gambling on the tables, so the prosecution case relied on three Chinese witnesses, who by the time of the trial were, respectively, dead, missing, or confined to a mental asylum, and so the case was withdrawn.

Chin Kaw subsequently sued fellow Launceston tobacco merchant Charles Ah Ying for the sum of £300 for malicious prosecution connected with the case, although the case was withdrawn by mutual consent.

In 1914, his shop was raided yet again by the police, who arrested Chin Kaw and others. The prosecution appeared to have a strong case as the police found money and gambling chips on the tables, but the charges were dropped without explanation at the start of the trial.

== Personal life and later years ==
Chin Kaw returned to China in 1886 and married Luei Fong, eventually bringing her out to Tasmania in 1890, making him one of only four former Weldborough miners who was able to bring out a wife from China in the restrictive immigration conditions of the time.

With the winding down of the Tasmanian tin-mining industry and the consequent reduction in size of the Chinese community, Chin Kaw moved from Launceston to Melbourne in 1916. He died in Melbourne in 1922 after a short illness, leaving an estate of several thousand pounds. He was survived by his wife Luei, his six sons (Alexander, Edward, Leslie, Victor, Julian and Herbert), his four daughters (Sybil Ethel, Edith Margaret, Ruby and Elsmene), his brother Chin Ah Lin, and his brother's daughter Irene Lin.

== Legacy ==
Ah Kaw's son Alexander took over the family store in Launceston and took an interest in commerce between Australia and China, founded the Chinese Club in Sydney, and served as Commercial and Political Advisor to the Chinese Consul-General in Australia in the 1930s.

Ah Kaw's son Victor operated his own retail business in Devonport from 1932 until 1947, and distinguished himself as a badminton player, as well as by serving as Honorary Chinese Consul in Tasmania from 1931.

In 1936, Ah Kaw's son Herbert became the second person of Chinese descent to be admitted as a barrister in Victoria.

Many of Ah Kaw's children played prominent roles in organising war relief for China during the 1930s and 1940s.

The contents of the long-closed Kaw family shop in Launceston were eventually donated by Ah Kaw's descendants to the Queen Victoria Museum and Art Gallery in Launceston.
