= Yet Soo War Way Lee =

Chinese (Australian) merchant

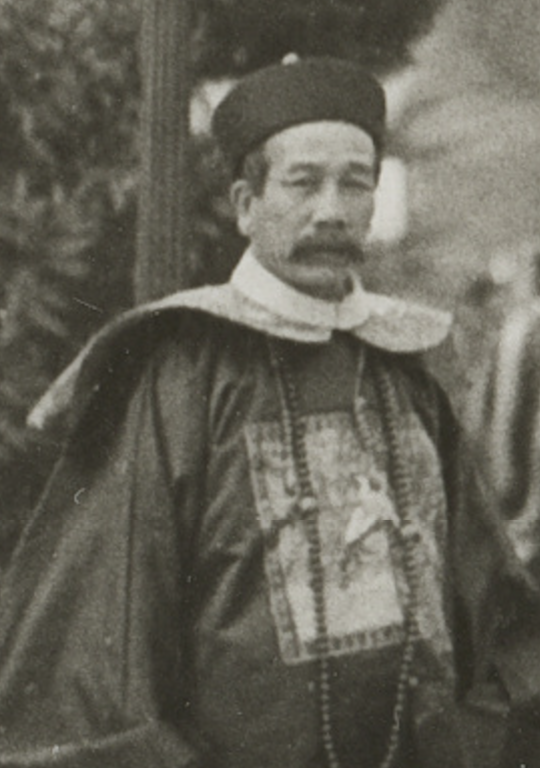
- Born: 1853; Guangdong, China
- Died: 1909 (aged 55–56); Adelaide, South Australia
- Occupation: Businessperson

Yet Soo War Way Lee
- Traditional Chinese: 葉繡華
- Simplified Chinese: 叶绣华
Transcriptions
Standard Mandarin
- Hanyu Pinyin: Yè Xiùhuá
Yue: Cantonese
- Jyutping: Jip6 Sau3 Waa4

Courtesy name
- Chinese: 維利
Transcriptions
Standard Mandarin
- Hanyu Pinyin: Wéi Lì
Yue: Cantonese
- Jyutping: Wai4 Lei6

Yet Soo War Way Lee (Chinese: 葉繡華維利; born Yett Soo War; 6 August 1852 - 21 August 1909), also known as Yett Way Lee and Y. S. W. Way Lee, was a Chinese-Australian merchant who lived in Adelaide, South Australia.

== Early life and move to Australia ==
Yett Soo War was born in King Shan (Chinese: 京山; pinyin: Jīngshān), a village of Tungkun, Guangdong. He was the only child of Yett She Clum, a rice-miller, and Cau She Ho King. His great-grandfather was reportedly an admiral in the Imperial Chinese Navy. As a young man, he married and had a son, Yett King Sum. Before his emigration, Yett had adopted the courtesy name Way Lee, which he used in business, often compounding it with his birth name, using "Way Lee" as a surname in Australia.

Way Lee migrated to Australia in 1874, joining his uncle Way Kee on George Street in Sydney, in the colony of New South Wales. He spent the next two years studying, first in Sydney and later Brisbane, in the colony of Queensland. In 1880, Way Lee settled in Adelaide, in the colony of South Australia, taking English classes at the City Mission of Adelaide.

== Way Lee & Company ==
Having maintained work with his uncle, by 1878, Way Lee had established an importing firm, Way Lee & Co. in Hindley Street, Adelaide. The company dealt in tea, porcelain, fireworks, Chinese medicines and general bric-a-brac. He expanded its operations across regional Australian with branches in Wentworth and Wilcannia in New South Wales, Quorn and Hawker, and further interests in the Daly River, Northern Territory and Millicent, South Australia.

Way Lee had one of the government contracts to supply the Ghan railway from Port Augusta to Hergott Springs/Maree. He partnered with several other Chinese merchants, including Hu Ting, to deliver food and other supplies to the expanding railway in the late 1880s.

Way Lee and other Chinese Australian merchants of the time formed the Chinese Empire Reform Association, of which he was president.

== Advocacy ==
Way Lee was a leader of the South Australian Chinese community, actively participating in community events, including hosting Chinese New Year dinners and providing support for disaster relief efforts in China. He advocated for the rights of Chinese residents of Australia, focusing on education, living conditions, and opposing opium trafficking.

He and Hu Ting authored at least one letter to the editor during the height of the anti-Chinese immigration debates in South Australia in the 1880s, and advocated to remove laws or rules that limited the ability of Chinese individuals to travel freely between the colonies.

In connection with the Jubilee Exhibition of 1887, Chinese Commissioners Wong Yung Ho (Wang Ronghe) and U Taing (Yu Quiong) visited Adelaide and appointed Way Lee, along with three others, including Quong Wing from Melbourne and Mei Quong Tart from Sydney, to deliver a memorial from the Chinese community in Australia to the Beijing Government. During the presentation of this document, Way Lee was honoured with the rank of Mandarin of the fourth degree.

== Personal life ==
Way Lee became a naturalised citizen of the colony of South Australia in 1882 and also joined the United Tradesmen's Masonic Lodge. He had also converted to Presbyterianism.

In 1889, Way Lee married Margaret Ann McDonald. They had three children.

== Death and legacy ==
In 1909, he was appointed Chinese Vice-Consul for South Australia but died before taking up the post, on 21 August 1909, in Adelaide. His cause of death was chronic nephritis and amyloid disease.

He is buried in West Terrace Cemetery, where thousands reportedly attended his funeral, including the South Australian Chief Justice, Sir Samuel Way, represented by his associate, W. L. Stuart.

The Way Lee Building, part of the University of South Australia on North Terrace, Adelaide, was named after him.
