= Marita Cheng =

Australian roboticist (born 1989)

Marita Cheng AM
- Born: 5 March 1989 (age 37); Cairns, Queensland, Australia
- Occupation: Entrepreneur
- Website: www.maritacheng.com

Marita Cheng AM (born 5 March 1989) is the founder of Robogals and co-founder of other companies. She was named the 2012 Young Australian of the Year. She was named as one of the World's Top 50 women in Technology by Forbes in 2018 and was recognised on the Forbes 30 Under 30 list in 2016. In 2019, Cheng was appointed a member of the Order of Australia for significant service to science and technology, particularly to robotics.

== Early life and education ==
Marita Cheng was born on 5 March 1989 in Cairns, north Queensland. She was raised by her mother, a single parent who worked as a hotel room cleaner, in a housing commission apartment in Queensland, Australia.

In 2007, while at university, Cheng founded Nudge, a company which provided reminders by phone or text message to help people manage their prescription drug schedules. She won a prize for the best undergraduate business at the University of Melbourne and then recruited friends to start designing workshops to teach girls about robotics. Cheng later graduated with a Bachelor of Engineering in mechatronics and a Bachelor of Computer Science.

== Career ==
The robotics workshops developed into Robogals, founded in 2008 for the purpose of encouraging young women into careers in STEM fields.

In 2011, Cheng was awarded a Churchill Fellowship, which allowed her to visit the U.S., U.K., Germany and Jamaica to learn about international approaches to science education for young women.

In November 2011, Cheng was named Victorian Young Australian of the Year for 2012, and went on to be named as Young Australian of the Year. In that same year she was also a winner in the Financial Review – Westpac 100 Women of Influence awards' Young Leader category.

Cheng visited China as part of the 40-Year Anniversary of Australia-China Diplomatic Relations, touring Guangzhou, Shanghai, Nanjing, Tianjin and Beijing in 2012.

In 2013 she established a start-up robotics company. She is the founder and current CEO of Aubot, a start-up robotics company.

Cheng delivered the closing keynote speech at the 35th World Congress of the World Association of Girl Guides and Girl Scouts in Hong Kong in 2014.

In 2015, Cheng attended Singularity University's flagship 10-week Graduate Studies Program, where she founded an app that uses AI to enable visually impaired people to recognize objects, receiving TechCrunch coverage during her time at the program. The app won a CES Best of Innovation Award in 2017.

Cheng co-led an Australian delegation of 50 entrepreneurs, industry representatives and government envoys, to Israel alongside Assistant Innovation Minister Wyatt Roy in 2015.

She co-founded Aipoly, which launched in January 2016. Aipoly is an app to assist blind people to recognise objects using their mobile phones.

Cheng returned to her robotics company, receiving a Myer Fellowship, and participated in the Advance Queensland Hot Desq program in 2017, relocating to Brisbane, Australia for 6 months, and the Austrade San Francisco Landing Pad in 2018, which brought her to San Francisco.

From 2012 to 2018, Cheng served on the board of the Foundation for Young Australians. Cheng helped decide on startup investments alongside Eddie McGuire as a board member of RMIT University's New Enterprise Investment Fund (2014-2017), and supported the Victorian startup ecosystem as a board member of the Victorian State Innovation Expert Panel (2016-2018). She was also involved with the Clinton Health Access Initiative as Technology Advisory Board Member (2016-2017).

== Public appearance ==
Cheng has given two TEDx talks, and has been a featured speaker at MIT Technology Review Conference in Singapore, IEEE International Conference on Robotics and Automation (ICRA), the World Entrepreneurship Forum in Lyon, the Global Summit of Women in Tokyo, and the Girl Scout National Convention in Utah.

She appeared live on TV as a panelist on ABC's Q&A, alongside Nobel laureates Brian Schmidt and Peter Doherty, Suzanne Cory and Chief Scientist of Australia Ian Chubb, and in 2011, served as a judge on The New Inventors. She spoke alongside Ashton Kutcher at Lenovo's #TECHmyway.

Cheng has been profiled in Vogue Australia, InStyle magazine, and The Australian Women's Weekly for her work as a technology entrepreneur.

Cheng frequently attends events via her company's Teleport robot, using the device to meet Prince Harry and Meghan, Duchess of Sussex in 2018, to appear on a panel with Israel's Chief Scientist Avi Hasson, and to give a speech at Robogals' 10-year anniversary gala dinner.

== Recognition and honours ==
- 2011 – Churchill Fellowship
- 2011 – Anita Borg Institute's Change Agent ABIE Award
- 2012 – Young Australian of the Year
- 2014 – RoboHub 25 Women in Robotics you need to know about
- 2014 – Global Engineering Deans Council Diversity Award
- 2016 – Forbes 30 Under 30
- 2016 – Asia Society's Asia Game Changer Award
- 2017 – American Australian Association Next Generation Leader
- 2018 – Forbes World's Top 50 Women in Technology
- 2018 – The NSW Award for Excellence in Women's Leadership
- 2019 – Member of the Order of Australia, for significant service to science and technology, particularly to robotics

Awards
Preceded by Jessica Watson	Young Australian of the Year; 2012	Succeeded by Akram Azimi
