= James Chung Gon =

Chinese-Tasmanian businessman (1854–1952)

- 鍾潤
- Pronunciation: Chung Gon
- Born: 23 July 1854; Xinhui, Guangdong, Qing Empire
- Died: 23 February 1952 (aged 97); Launceston, Tasmania, Australia
- Other name: 鍾潮孔
- Occupations: Chinese-Australian storekeeper, tin miner, market gardener and Baptist lay leader

Chinese name
- Traditional Chinese: 鍾潤
- Simplified Chinese: 钟润
Transcriptions
Standard Mandarin
- Hanyu Pinyin: Zhōng Rùn
Yue: Cantonese
- Jyutping: Zung^{1} Jeon^{6}

Chung Chu-Kong
- Traditional Chinese: 鍾潮孔
- Simplified Chinese: 钟潮孔
Transcriptions
Standard Mandarin
- Hanyu Pinyin: Zhōng Cháokǒng
Yue: Cantonese
- Jyutping: Zung^{1} Ciu^{4}Hung^{2}

James Chung Gon (23 July 1854 – 23 February 1952) was a Chinese Australian storekeeper, tin miner, market gardener, and Baptist lay preacher in Launceston, Tasmania, Australia, who became the leader of the Tasmanian Chinese community by the time of his death at 97, and was instrumental in organising the removal of the Weldborough joss house to the Victoria Museum in Launceston in the 1930s.

His funeral procession in 1952 was observed by hundreds of mourners lining the road, and his pallbearers included a Tasmanian Government Minister and the Mayor of Launceston.
