= Lily Ah Toy =

Australian businesswoman (1917–2001)

- Born: Wong Wu Len; October 24, 1917; Darwin, Northern Territory, Australia
- Died: October 15, 2001 (aged 83); Darwin, Northern Territory, Australia
- Children: 5 (5 more adopted)

Lily Ah Toy (born Wong Wu Len) (24 October 1917 – 15 October 2001) was an Australian pioneer and businesswoman famous in the Northern Territory.

== Biography ==
On October 24, 1917, Ah Toy was born in Darwin to Chinese parents. Her father Wong Yueng, who worked as a timber cutter and fencer, had come to the Northern Territory from Hong Kong in the 1880s, where he married Linoy Moo, her mother. She was raised in a "strictly Chinese" household and was raised with the Buddhist and Taoist faiths. The family lived in a small house, constructed of stringy bark, bush timber and second-hand galvanized iron, which her father had built for them, and they grew much of their own food. Ah Toy walked into town each day to collect food the family could not grow; she also said that her clothes were made from flour bags.

Ah Toy attended Darwin Public School. She left when she was 14, in 1931, to become a housemaid for Lyle Tivendale, the Darwin health inspector, in his home at Myilly Point. She worked there for three years and met Jimmy Ah Toy, her future husband, who sold vegetables there. On 9 November 1936 they married in a Chinese style ceremony and she took his surname.

After they married they moved together to Pine Creek, where the Ah Toy family had a store and bakery, and began working there in the bakery section. Ah Toy had five children of her own (Edward, Laurence, Joyce, Grace and Elaine) and adopted five more.

Following the Bombing of Darwin in 1942, she was evacuated to Adelaide, where Jimmy worked in a munitions factory, before being able to return to Pine Creek in 1945. On their return to Pine Creek they found that the shop had been looted, but they started again and reestablished the business. She said of her return: "[w]e had land here, and our roots are here".

In 1982, Ah Toy graduated from Darwin Community College (now Charles Darwin University) with an Associate Diploma of Arts (Ceramics) and she was, at that time, their oldest graduate at 65 years of age.

Ah Toy died in Darwin on October 15, 2001.

== Awards and recognition ==
In 1985, Film Australia produced her biography.

In 1988, as part of Australia's bicentennial celebrations, she was honoured as one of eight Northern Territorians who had made a significant contribution to the territory.

In 2003, she was honoured in the Tribute to Northern Territory Women.

== Resources about ==
Ah Toy has two oral history recordings available through Library & Archives NT: one recorded by Sandra Saunders in April 1981 (NTRS 3164 BWF 424, NTRS 226 TS 1/2), the other by Jane Bathgate in July 1996 (NTRS 3164 BWF 1771, NTRS 1983 TS 8706).

Another recording of Ah Toy was made in December 1982 for the Australia 1938 Oral History Project, at the National Library of Australia.
