= Jane Elizabeth Tye =

Chinese-Australian midwife (1869–1934)

Jane Elizabeth Tye née Hang Gong (28 July 1869 – 12 June 1934) was a Chinese-Australian midwife who spent much of her life living in Darwin in the Northern Territory of Australia.

== Biography ==
Tye was born in Creswick in Victoria and was the daughter of Lee and Sarah Hang Gong. In about 1881, when Tye was still a young child, the family moved to Darwin where he father became a prominent businessman and her mother began working as a midwife. In 1883, not long after the move, Tye travelled to Sydney where she remained, without her family.

In 1885 her mother returned to Sydney to give permission for Tye to marry George Tye, a storekeeper from Canton and, between 1886 ad 1896 the couple had five children all born in New South Wales. In June 1896 Tye moved to Darwin with her husband and family and, in April 1898 gave birth to her final child there; this child appears to not have reached adulthood.

In Darwin Tye began working as a midwife and was highly sought after for her skill; much of which she had likely learned from her mother. Of her skills Lily Ah Toy said: "[t]he whole Chinese community, and others, trusted her" and another local woman, Mary Agostini said "[w]hen you knew you were pregnant you got to get a midwife early because she was always booked up... she delivered... most of the babies in the area. She was the only reliable one".

In addition to serving the Darwin area she would also travel to Borroloola, and other remote areas, with some regularity to assist in births there. To assist in these births she would often arrive a few days before the baby was due and stay for a number of days after the birth to assist the new mother and assist with their post-natal care.

In Darwin George Tye became a contractor and, not able to speak much English, relied on his wife regularly for her interpreting services. Tye would also act as an interpreter in many court cases involving Chinese speakers in the Darwin courts.

Tye died on 12 June 1934 and her death notice stated:

The late Mrs. Tye was for almost 40 years a midwifery nurse in Darwin, and such was her skill in her profession that she never lost a single case either of mother or child.

— Death of Mrs JE Tye, Northern Standard, 12 June 1934

Later, with in the same article:

In the days before motor cars night calls almost invariably meant walking, but rain or fine, near or far, for rich or poor, a call for nursing aid to Nurse Tye was unfailingly responded to, and many mothers scattered throughout the Northern Territory and further afield will shed a silent tear at her passing.

— Death of Mrs JE Tye, Northern Standard, 12 June 1934

== Legacy ==
In 2012 Tye was honoured by Malarndirri McCarthy in the Tribute to Territory Women as a pioneering midwife.
