= Ah Hong =

Chinese market gardener in Australia (c. 1857–1952)

Ah Hong (c. 1857–1952) was a Chinese-Australian miner, cook and market gardener who spent most of his life in Alice Springs, in the Northern Territory of Australia. He a well-regarded figure in an era of considerable prejudice towards Chinese people in Australia.

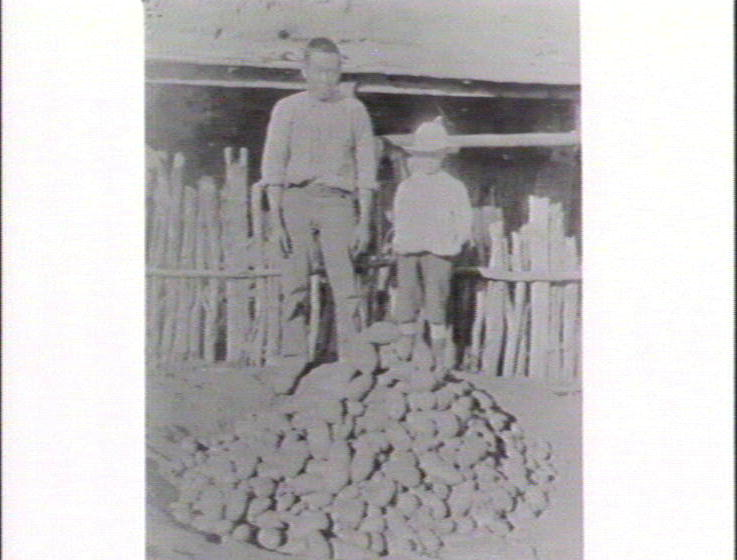
Ah Hong and young child

== Early life ==
Hong was born in Canton, now Guangzhou, around 1857, and little is known of his early life. His descendants believe that he travelled to Australia some time in the 1870s.

== Life in the Northern Territory ==
When Hong first arrived in the Northern Territory, some time in the 1870s, he first worked in the Top End on the Pine Creek goldfields and then the North Australia Railway before moving to Central Australia as a cook for the crews building the Overland Telegraph. He later described witnessing many of the thousands of fellow Chinese immigrants dying in the harsh labour conditions of railway construction. Once in Central Australia, he first worked as a cook at Bond Springs Station and then, briefly, as a miner at Arltunga. He was also, at some point, engaged by the Winnecke survey party (see: Charles Winnecke).

In 1892 Hong settled in Alice Springs, then known as Stuart, and established a market garden on Todd Street on what is now the site of Megafauna Central. At his garden Hong grew a variety of vegetables and raised chickens. He sold his produce using a horse and cart, travelling as far as Arltunga. Walter Smith recalled his visits there and said it was a time of great excitement for him as a boy and that Hong had the best garden in the area; Smith said that "fresh fruit and vegetables were not a luxury so much as a necessity for good health". He also said that, because of the distances involved there was a premium on the produce.

Hong met and married Ranjika, a Western Arrernte woman, and they ran the garden together with the help of Bulabaka, one of Ranjika's three sons from a previous relationship. Hong and Ranjika had three children together: Dempsey, Ada and Gloria. As children of a 'mixed marriage' they were exposed to significant amount of racism. Education for his children was important to Hong and he sent his two eldest children, Dempsey and Ada, to school in Oodnadatta (selling his interests in Alice Springs) before the establishment of the first school in Alice Springs in 1914 where the children were taught, by Ida Standley at The Bungalow.

Following the death of Ranjika in 1918, Hong took his children to China to be cared for by his family there. After a year long journey, Hong spent a year there before returning alone to Alice Springs. Once in Alice Springs again, Hong established a market garden on a new site, on Gap Road, where he also established an eating house for single men who were welcome to 'roll out their swags' in the garden for the price of a meal and built a large stone oven to become one of the town's first bakers.

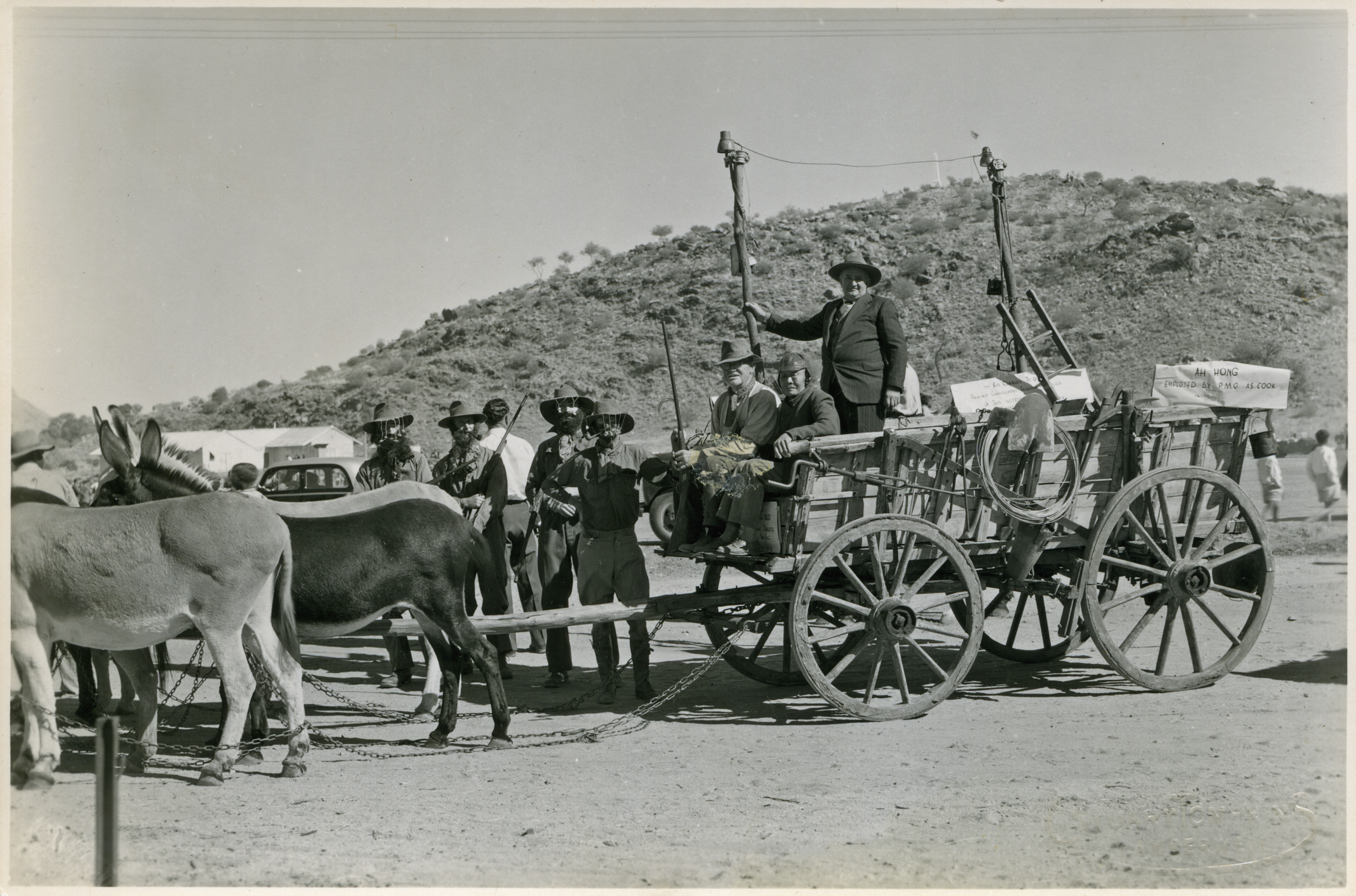
Cart in the Alice Springs Jubilee Day Parade containing Ah Hong, September 1951

Ada, who before the move had been working as a governess at Ryan Well, struggled to adapt to life in a Chinese village and is reported to have died during World War II while living there. His other children did return with Dempsey coming back to work on Thursday Island and in Darwin where he died while still a young man. His youngest daughter Gloria Ouida Lee would also return to Australia and work as a miner.

In 1949 when he was nearing 100 years old, and in need of financial support, the community of Alice Springs joined together to create the "Ah Hong fund", to support him in his retirement; over £160 was raised in recognition of the debt they owed him.

Hong died in 1952, at the approximate age of 102 and, when he died the remainder of the Ah Hong fund was donated to the Australian Inland Mission to be used to support other older men.

== Legacy ==
Hong was highly respected in the community of Alice Springs. When he died, the Centralian Advocate described his passing as marking a milestone in local history:

Even those who did not know Ah Hong personally, felt that he was somehow indestructable, that he was in affinity with the early heroic days in the north of Australia. He is gone now. His name will not be forgotten while one of the pioneers remain. Every person that knew him speaks of Ah Hong as a great and kindly man who did much for people. What better memory to leave behind.

— Centralian Advocate; 6 June 1952

Many of Hong's descendants live in and around the Northern Territory and Alice Springs.

Hong Street in Gillen (a suburb of Alice Springs) is named for him.

A short biography of Hong was written by Alice Springs based historian Adele Purvis and is available as a part of NTRS 1/P1 at Library & Archives NT.
