= Shui Kwong Lo =

Methodist minister in Darwin, Australia (1900–1995)

Shui Kwong Lo (11 November 1900 – 8 September 1995) was a Chinese-born Methodist minister who also ran a Chinese School for children. He spent much of his life Darwin in the Northern Territory of Australia and he also ministered in Sydney and Papua New Guinea

== Life in China ==
Lo was born in Juk-Yuan Village in the Pok-Lo Province in Southern China and both his father and grandfather were Christians due to the presence of the London Missionary Society in the area. However, Lo's mother followed Confucianism and he was raised with these until the age of 12.

As a child Lo was educated locally until entering Hip-Wo University in Guangzhou and, after completing his studies there went on the what was then known as Canton Theological College (Guangdong Union Theological Seminary) where he gained his licentiate of theology in 1929.

After completing his studies he worked for the London Missionary Society in Macau, Guangzhou and Hong Kong until 1941. In these roles his skills in languages were very much in need; Lo could speak Hakka, Cantonese and Mandarin.

On 12 December 1931 he married Wong Yuk Yuen, a teacher, in Hong Kong and they would go on to have four children together.

== Life in Australia ==
On 5 December 1941, during World War II, Lo and his family moved to Darwin under the auspices of the Methodist Overseas Mission and he became the Methodist pastor of the Darwin Chinese Community as well as briefly acting as a school teacher. The school that Lo was teaching at was soon closed, in January 1942, in the lead up to the Bombing of Darwin and as many of the civilian residents were evacuated due to the escalation of the war.

Lo too was soon evacuation at settled in Townsville with his family and a number of other Chinese families from Darwin. Soon after arriving he helped reopen the Townsville Chinese School and was soon teaching 21 students. This was, however, short-lived and, on 21 October 1942, he accepted a position with the Chinese Presbyterian Church in Sydney while also delivering sermons at a number of other Chinese congregations in the area. He was the first Chinese minister in the area for several years and, on 4 March 1943 he was ordained into the ministry of the Methodist Church of Australia.

He would remain here until 1946 when he returned to Darwin to work with the Methodist Overseas Mission.

Lo, his wife and youngest child arrived back in Darwin in September 1946 and their three eldest children remained in Sydney to complete their schooling at Methodist schools. They moved into a war damaged house in Larrakeyah and they made extensive repairs to it which included adding classrooms and an extra bedroom. With the extensions Lo was able to offer Chinese School there and also deliver Chinese language sermons to adults.

== Life in Papua New Guinea ==
In 1948 Lo was requested to go to Rabaul in Papua New Guinea to relieve their minister who was retiring and it was decided that there were more Chinese people there in need of his help then in Darwin. Lo went and left his wife in charge of the school and enjoyed his time there. He would later write home that there were about 1,280 Chinese people living there and that he had more than 300 children at Sunday school.

== Later life ==
Lo returned to Darwin on leave in 1952 and returned there with his wife. They would stay there until 1958 when, experiencing ill health, they decided to move to Brisbane and, in 1964, to return to Darwin.

In Darwin Lo would assist in raising funds for both the building of the Uniting War Memorial Church and the Chung Wah Hall.

Lo died on 8 September 1995 in Darwin.

== Collections ==
A collection of Lo's is available through Library & Archives NT:

- NTRS 1079 Typescript "From my Darwin notebook" and photographs relating to Chinese life in Darwin
