= Mei Quong Tart =

Chinese-Australian merchant (1850–1903)

Quong Tart
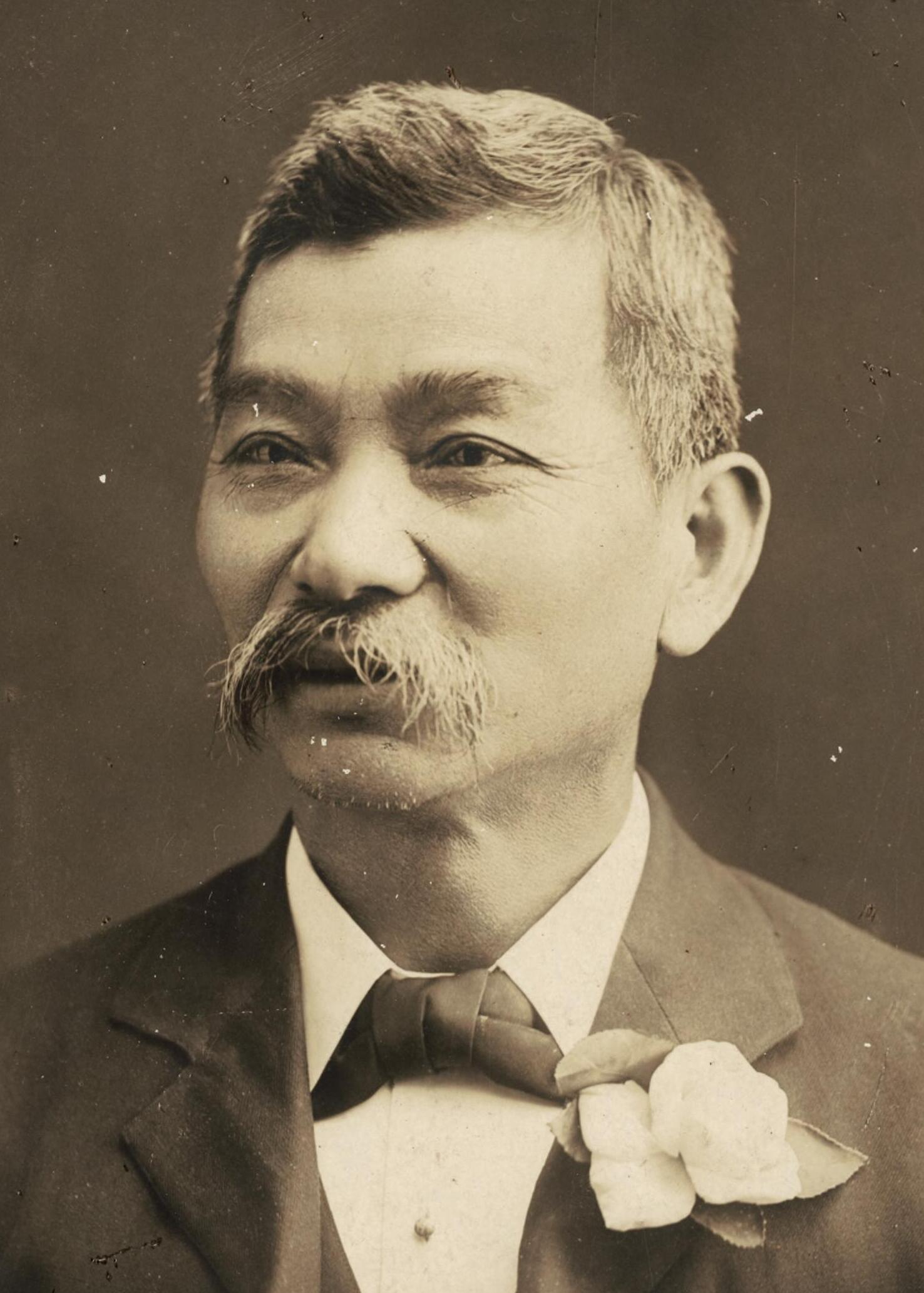
- Born: 1850; Taishan, Jiangmen, Guangdong, China
- Died: 26 July 1903 (aged 52–53); Ashfield, Sydney, Australia
- Spouse: Margaret Scarlett
- Children: 6

Mei Quong Tart
- Traditional Chinese: 梅光達
- Simplified Chinese: 梅光达
Transcriptions
Standard Mandarin
- Hanyu Pinyin: Méi Guāngdá
Yue: Cantonese
- Yale Romanization: Muìh Gwōngdaaht

Moy Quong Tart (1850–1903), often anachronistically known as Mei Quong Tart, was a prominent nineteenth century Sydney merchant from China. He was one of Sydney's most famous and well-loved personalities and made a significant impact on the social and political scene of Sydney at a time of strong anti-Chinese sentiment. His Australian contemporaries referred to him by his Chinese given name, Quong Tart, which would go on to be the surname used by his descendants, such as Josh Quong Tart.

== Public life ==
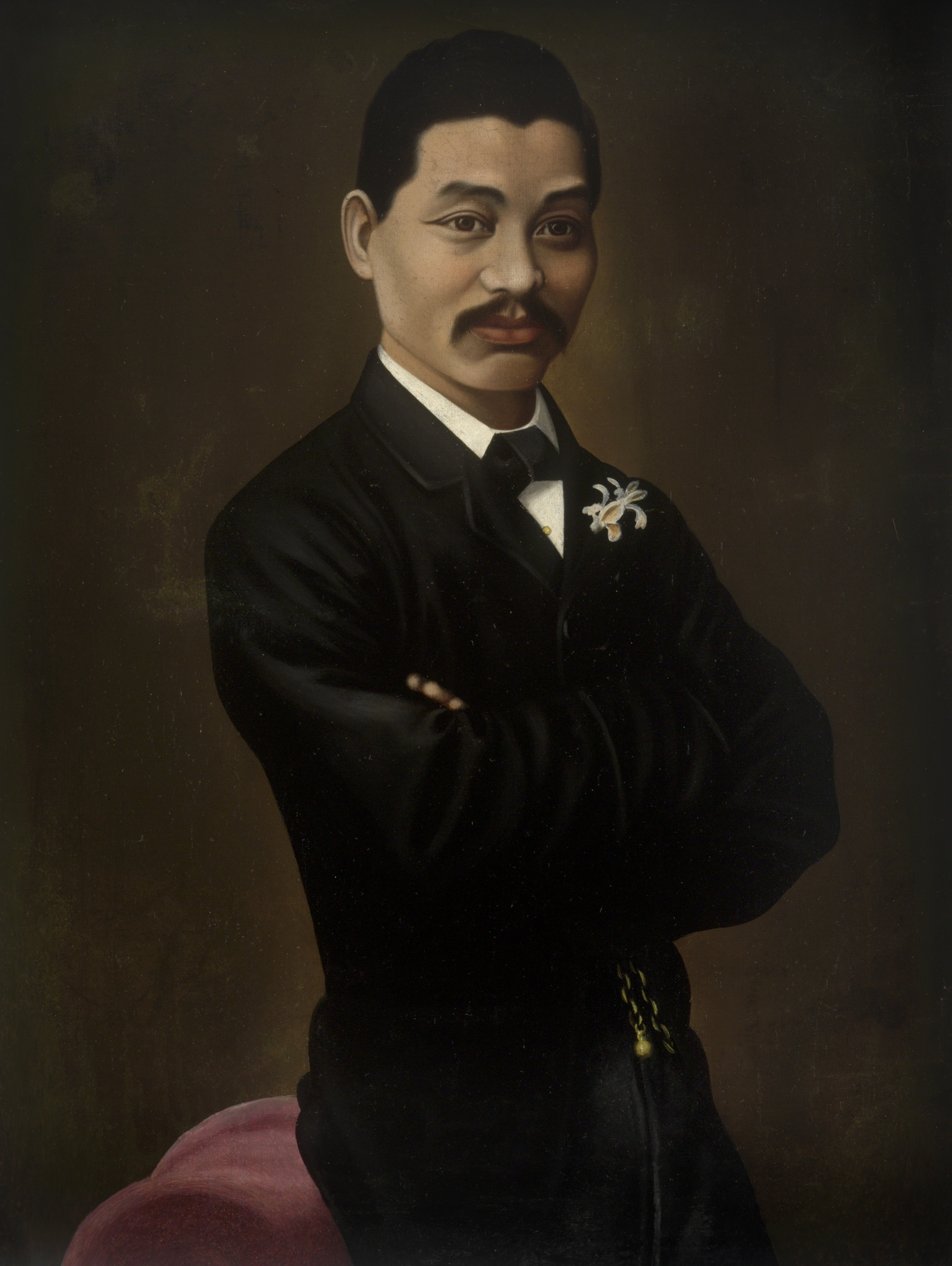
Portrait of Quong Tart, ca. 1880s, State Library of NSW

A prominent businessman, he owned a network of tearooms in the Sydney Arcade, the Royal Arcade and King Street. His crowning success was the ‘Elite Hall’ in the Queen Victoria Market, now the Queen Victoria Building. He was also a community leader, well connected with the local political and social elites. The Imperial government of China awarded him the status of a Mandarin of the fifth degree, with blue feather, in 1887, in acknowledgment of his service to the Overseas Chinese community and to European-Chinese relations in Australia and for assisting with the 1887 Chinese mission to Australia sponsored by Zhang Zhidong, which was the first official Chinese mission to visit Australia. In 1894, he was advanced to the fourth degree by the Emperor personally and was appointed Mandarin of the Blue Button, honoured by the Dragon Throne with the Peacock Feather. Quong Tart's parents and grandparents were also granted titles at the same time.

An active philanthropist, he often provided dinners, gifts and entertainment at his own expense for recipients ranging from the Benevolent Society home at Liverpool, other leading Chinese-born merchants, including Yet Soo War Way Lee of Adelaide, to the newsboys of Ashfield, Summer Hill, Croydon and Burwood. From 1885 to 1888, he provided a series of dinners for the inmates of destitute asylums. He also had progressive ideas about Sydney social politics. His tea rooms were the site of the first meetings of Sydney's suffragettes, and he devised new and improved employment policies for staff, such as paid sick leave.

He was a spokesman for the Chinese community, often advocating for the rights of Chinese Australians and working as an interpreter. He was one of the founders of the first Chinese merchants association in Sydney, titled the Lin Yik Tong. In 1888, he co-signed a petition to Zhang Zhidong requesting that the Chinese government set up a consulate in Australia. In 1889, he sent a petition in his own name requesting the same, and also that the Chinese government raise the issue of maltreatment of Chinese residents in Australia with the British government.

He campaigned against the opium trade, and in 1883 went on an investigation into the Chinese camps in Southern New South Wales. The report revealed widespread opium addiction, and on 24 April 1884, Quong Tart presented a petition to the colonial secretary requesting the ban of opium imports. In June of that year, Quong Tart also tried to win support for a ban on opium in Melbourne and Ballarat, Victoria. In 1887, he presented a second petition to parliament and produced a pamphlet titled A Plea for the Abolition of the Importation of Opium.

He was also part of the NSW Royal Commission on Alleged Chinese Gambling and Immorality and Charges of Bribery Against Members of the Police Force from 1891 to 1892.

== Early life ==
Quong Tart was born in 1850 in the village of Shandi (山底), Duanfen (端芬鎮) in southern Taishan, Guangdong province, China. His father, named Mei Kuoyuan, was a fairly successful merchant dealing in ornamental wares. Quong Tart immigrated to Australia in 1859 with his uncle, transporting a shipload of miners to the goldfields around Araluen and Braidwood in regional New South Wales. Once in Braidwood, Quong Tart lived at Bell's Creek in the store of Scottish Thomas Forsyth. In the following years, he was taken in by the wealthy family of Robert Percy Simpson, whose wife Alice Simpson, née Want, was charmed by his Scottish accent. Under the Simpsons, Quong Tart learnt to behave as a proper English gentleman and converted to Christianity.

Aged just 21, Quong Tart built a cottage at Bell's Creek with a small fortune developed from investing in gold claims and was prominent in sporting, cultural and religious affairs. On 11 July 1871, he became a naturalised British subject, joined the Freemasons in 1885 and was appointed to the board of the Bell's Creek public school in 1877.

In 1881, he returned to Taishan, China at the request of his family, and visited Canton and Nanking to set up operations for a tea trade to Sydney. On returning to Sydney, he established a chain of silk stores and tea shops. The tea shops were intended to provide customers with samples of tea, but became so successful that he turned his shops into tea rooms, the first tea rooms in Sydney. In February 1882, he applied for a trademark with which to market his tea.

On 30 August 1886, he married a young English school teacher, Margaret Scarlett. Her family, although friends with Quong Tart, did not approve of the union and her father refused to attend the wedding. In 1888, Quong Tart and Margaret visited China with their daughter. In Canton, Quong Tart met with Zhang Zhidong, Viceroy of Liangguang, the man who had granted Quong Tart his honours of a mandarin of the fifth degree the previous year. Quong Tart reported to Zhang the anti-Chinese sentiments in Australia and urged the Imperial government to raise the matter with the British government.

== Tea rooms ==
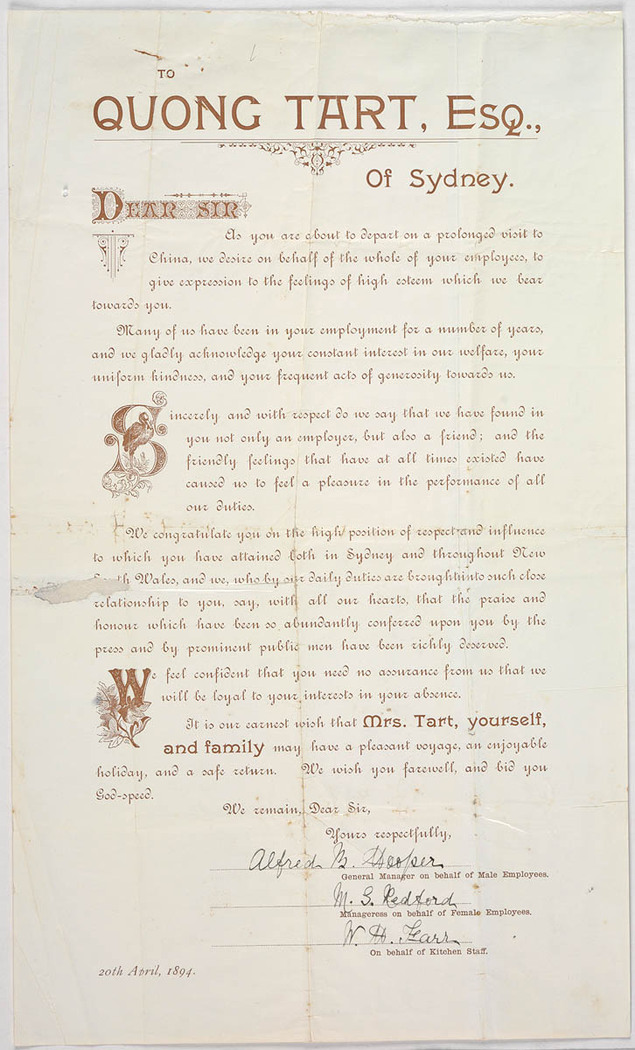
Bon voyage letter from employees (20 April 1894)

In December 1889, Quong Tart opened the Loong Shan Tea House at 137 King Street, Sydney. It was his grandest tea room, with marble fountains and ponds with golden carp. The tea and grill rooms occupied the ground floor while on the first floor, there was a reading room. It soon became one of Sydney's most important meeting places. The site is now part of the Glasshouse shopping complex, home to the Tea Centre.

With construction of the Queen Victoria Market building being completed in 1898, Quong Tart saw it as an opportunity to expand his business and set up a tea room with additional cloak and smoke room.

Quong Tart's Elite Hall in the Queen Victoria Market Building was formally opened by the Mayor of Sydney, Matthew Harris, in 1898. The tea rooms were on the ground floor near the centre of the markets, fronting George Street. A plush-carpeted staircase led to the function hall on the first floor. The Elite Hall had capacity for nearly 500 people and included a stage with an elaborately carved proscenium. At the other end was the Elite Dining Saloon, described as having 'elegant appointments.' His teahouses were popular with high society and VIPs, with members of the 1891 Federation Convention dining at the Elite Hall.

Quong Tart's tea rooms were also located at 777 George St, in Moore Park Zoo, and in the Haymarket theatre district. They were the site of Sydney's first suffragette meetings, and between 1885 and 1888, were home to functions for inmates of destitute asylums. As part of his employment program, he devised new policies for his employees, including sick leave, holiday pay and time off for personal reasons.

== Personal life ==
Quong Tart had two sons and four daughters, whom, although Anglican himself, he baptised in different denominations to avoid charges of prejudice.

Quong Tart and his family lived in his mansion, 'Gallop House,' in the Sydney suburb of Ashfield, while his four daughters attended the nearby Presbyterian Ladies' College at Croydon, the first Asian students to attend the school.

He was well known as a uniquely Victorian character, being a Chinese Australian who adopted the dress and manners of an English gentleman. Quong Tart was "as well known as the Governor himself" and "quite as popular among all classes" in NSW.

Name

Born in Duanfen (端芬),Taishan, “Quong Tart” is a romanization that reflects the local Taishanese dialect (a Yue Chinese dialect, related to Cantonese). In this dialect, his full name, 梅光達, would be romanized as Moy Quong Tart (cf. Cantonese Jyutping Mui4 Gwong1 Daat6). In Mandarin Chinese, the characters are pronounced quite differently and would be written in Hanyu Pinyin as Mei Guangda.

During his life, he was referred to by what non-Chinese Australians assumed was his surname—"Quong Tart," but was in actuality his given name, as a result of others not knowing that the surname goes first in Chinese names: "My lady friends will thus be shocked to hear that for all these years they have been calling the admirable Quong Tart by his Christian name. What should they have called him? That is the question. In full, the appellation by which he would have been known in China appears to be Moy Quong Tart …"

The name Mei Quong Tart is thus a recent Australianism combining the historic Taishanese-based romanisation (Quong Tart) with the surname in the now prevalent Mandarin pinyin, 'Mei.'

== Death ==
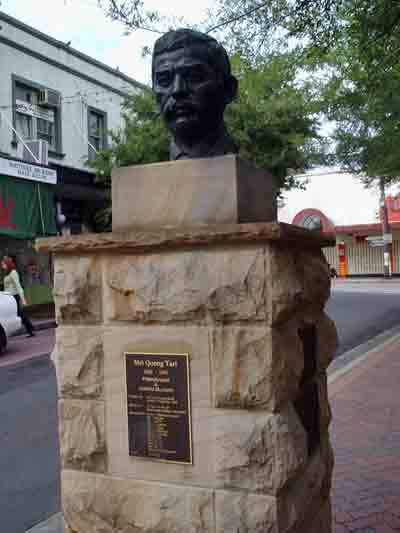
Bust of Quong Tart near Ashfield railway station

On 26th of July 1903, Quong Tart was brutally bashed with an iron bar and robbed of a few pounds at his office in the Queen Victoria Building, a crime that shocked Sydney. The attacker, Frederick Duggan, described as a "dim-witted thug," was jailed for 12 years, a light sentence for a crime that police believed was a simple robbery gone wrong. After the attack, Quong Tart never fully recovered, and he died from pleurisy at his Ashfield home 11 months later on 26 July 1903, aged 53. His funeral, held on 28 July 1903, featured the "who's who" of Sydney and was widely covered in the newspapers. Two hundred men escorted the coffin from his Ashfield mansion to a train which transported the funeral party to Rookwood Cemetery. There, thousands of Sydneysiders gathered to pay their last respects. Quong Tart was dressed in his ceremonial robes of a Mandarin of the Blue Button, under his masonic apron.

Many believe that his attack and consequential death was more than a burglary mishap. Letters from his Chinese friends indicate that many of them had suspicions about Quong Tart's death, believing that it could have been arranged by "the Western people" or by other jealous Chinese businessmen.

As a commemoration, in 1998 a statue was erected for him in Ashfield. He was survived by his wife, two sons, and four daughters.

== Centenary celebrations ==
To mark the centenary since Quong Tart's passing, a 12-month celebration was held in venues throughout Sydney.

During July and August 2004, an exhibition was held in the Queen Victoria Building titled, "No Ordinary Man. Sydney's Quong Tart: citizen, merchant & philanthropist." Curated by Dr Nicola Teffer, it featured information and photographs documenting Quong Tart's busy life in China and Australia and was coordinated by the Quong Tart Commemoration Committee. A 32-page illustrated catalogue was also made available.

The Powerhouse Museum also held a three-day international conference at the start of July, "Quong Tart and his time, 1850–1903" which featured a multimedia performance held at the University of Technology, called "Tales of a Tartan Mandarin – The Story of Quong Tart."

The QVB Tearoom and the Tea Centre on King Street also arranged a special menu item of "quong tarts," a unique fruit tart, to celebrate their historical link with Mei Quong Tart.

== Racehorses ==
Between 1887 and 1927, a number of racehorses were named for Quong Tart.

== Descendants ==
- Josh Quong Tart, Australian actor (Great-grandson)
