= Selina Hassan =

Australian businesswoman (1901–1996)

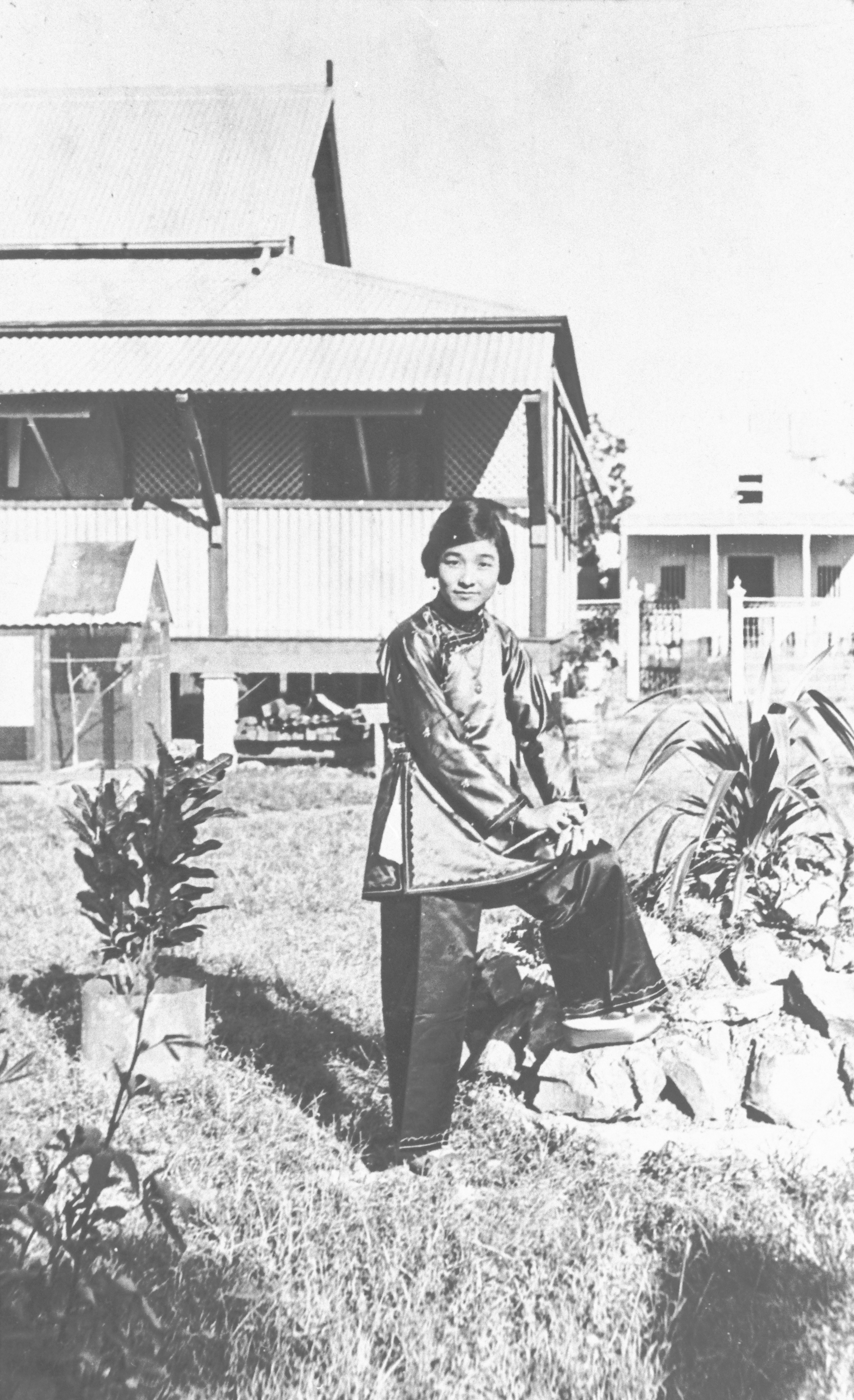
Selina Hassan in 1923

Selina Hassan née Hang Gong (22 February 1901 – 30 May 1996) was a businesswoman and Chinese community leader from Darwin, Northern Territory, Australia.

== Biography ==
Hassan was the daughter, and one of several children, to Emiline Lee Hang Gong (also known as Emily Louey) and Arthur Edward Lee Hang Gong, who was born in Victoria. Her father was a businessman, police constable and interpreter in Darwin and, together, Emiline and Arthur were involved in tin mining in West Arm where they operated the Wheel of Fortune mine. In 1902 or 1903 the family made significant profits from the mine and travelled with their children to Hong Kong in 1905; while there Hassan's youngest sister Florence died and so did her father. In 1908 Emiline returned to Australia and left Hassan and two of her brothers, to live with their father's second wife; they did not return to Darwin until 1910.

Back in Darwin Hassan worked to care for her elderly grandmother, Sarah Hang Gong, who was paralyzed while her mother ran a small shop offering food and drinks including tripe soup on Cavanagh Street. When Bowman died in 1911 Hassan was able to return to school for a short time; first at the convent school and then at Darwin Public School. Hassan would later complain that "really I never had enough education" and that, when she left school she only received a grade 3 certificate.

In 1919 Hassan travelled to Canton (Guangzhou) to marry Ali Hassan, an Islamic, Chinese-Indian man who had immigrated to Australia from Hong Kong on a pearl lugger and was, at the time of their wedding, working as the manager of Darwin's only butcher. He was more than twice her and it is unclear whether Hassan realised that he had married Omaka Sagaguchi in 1903 in Darwin and that she was still alive. Together they had four children; Ruby in around 1920 (who they adopted from a relative), Sophie May in 1920 (who died as a baby) and Serapha Constance (Connie) in 1924 and Allan in 1928. At the age of 15 Hassan had also begun caring for Henry Lee, a 'European' child who had been abandoned by his family, and he became known as the 'White Chinaman'.

Hassan's husband died suddenly of a stroke in 1929, at the age of 53, when the children were young and he left he the majority of his estate, including extensive property holdings on Cavenagh Street. This led to a protracted legal battle between Hassan and her husband's first wife who was now living in Japan, who was formally acknowledged as the legal wife of Ali Hassan, between 1930 and 1935. Ultimately Hassan was successful and able to keep what her husband had left her.

Hassan was also an active member of the Kuomintang branch in Darwin and she served as secretary in 1930 and, in 1932 when she presented an address at a banquet for WP Chen, the consul-general for China in Australia, she praised the party for their comparatively progressive views about the role of women in society.

During this period Hassan continued to support herself as a businesswoman and established, with other members of the Chinese business community, a car hire business and, in 1932, opened her own store 'S Hassan and Company' where she worked as a tailor and a draper; she also imported rubber goods, including toys, from Singapore.

In February 1938 Hassan remarried, this time to Hamdan Bin Mahomed Amid, who was an indentured Malaysian pearler. When he completed his indenture he was forced to leave Australia and in 1940 Hassan and her children joined him in Singapore and part of their motivation for travelling there was so that the children could learn more about their shared Islamic faith. They were ultimately forced to stay there during the Japanese occupation but avoided some of the worst treatment inflicted on the Chinese population as they were living within the Malay Quarter. While there the government compulsorily acquired her land in Darwin and, when she sought legal redress, she was awarded significantly below what it was worth.

After the war Hassan sought to resettle in Australia and, despite difficulty caused by the White Australia policy, they were mostly able to do so. Her husband, Amid, was denied entry altogether and they divorced in 1947.

Hassan settled in Melbourne where she ran a milk bar and newsagency until 1953 before beginning work as a nurse (at the age of 52).

She died on 30 May 1996 in Melbourne.
