= 2024 Australia Day Honours =

Annual honours list

The 2024 Australia Day Honours are appointments to various orders and honours to recognise and reward good works by Australian citizens. The list was announced on 26 January 2024 by the Governor General of Australia, David Hurley.

The Australia Day Honours are the first of the two major annual honours lists, the first announced to coincide with Australia Day (26 January), with the other being the King's Birthday Honours, which are announced on the second Monday in June.

== Order of Australia ==
Order of Australia civil ribbon

Order of Australia military ribbon

=== Companion of the Order of Australia (AC) ===
==== General Division ====
- Emeritus Professor David Vernon Boger – For eminent service to chemical engineering as a scientist, academic and researcher, particularly in the field of non-Newtonian fluid mechanics, and to the environment.
- Catherine Brighid Livingstone, AO – For eminent service to business, particularly through governance and strategic reform, to tertiary education, to science, technology and innovation capability development, and to the arts.
- Professor Lorraine Ann Mazerolle – For eminent service to education, to the social sciences as a criminologist and researcher, and to the development of innovative, evidence-based policing reforms.
- Professor Deborah Jane Terry, AO – For eminent service to tertiary education as an institutional leader and academic, to the strengthening of higher education through collaboration and innovation, and to the community.

=== Officer of the Order of Australia (AO) ===
==== General Division ====
- Julian Bickersteth – For distinguished service to the museum and arts sector, and to conservation and the environment.
- The Honourable Justice Jenny May Blokland – For distinguished service to the judiciary, to the law, to professional associations, and to the community.
- Paul Anthony Briggs, OAM – For distinguished service to the Indigenous community, to social welfare through economic inclusion and reconciliation, and to sporting organisations.
- Bruce James Carter – For distinguished service to business, to charitable organisations, and to the community.
- Professor Deli Chen – For distinguished service to sustainable agriculture, to Australia-China relations, to philanthropic endeavours, and as a mentor.
- Professor Deborah Ann Cobb-Clark – For distinguished service to economic research, to tertiary education, and to the social sciences.
- Professor Sally Lewers Dunwoodie – For distinguished service to medical research as an embryologist and geneticist, particularly in the field of foetal, and neonatal heart disease.
- Margaret Fink – For distinguished service to the arts as a film and television producer, and as a supporter of the visual arts community.
- Lisa Anne Fitzpatrick – For distinguished service to the nursing and midwifery professions through leadership and advocacy roles.
- The Honourable Larissa Tahireh Giddings – For distinguished service to the people and Parliament of Tasmania, and to the community.
- Dr Graham Cameron Grant – For distinguished service to biomedical engineering as a pioneer of innovative equipment development, and to medicine.
- The Honourable Robin Trevor Gray – For distinguished service to the people and Parliament of Tasmania, to economic development, and to the agricultural sector.
- His Honour Professor the Honourable Hugh Crosby Heggie, PSM – For distinguished service to medicine and medical research organisations, and as Administrator of the Northern Territory.
- Bill Henson – For distinguished service to the visual arts as a photographer, and to the promotion of Australian culture.
- Professor Ian Bernard Hickie, AM – For distinguished service to psychiatric research and reforms as an advocate for improved mental health care and awareness.
- The Honourable Justice Judith Clair Kelly – For distinguished service to the judiciary, to the law, to professional associations, and to women.
- The late Emeritus Professor Robin William King – For distinguished service to engineering, to tertiary education, and to professional organisations through executive roles.
- Professor Kuntala Lahiri-Dutt – For distinguished service to natural resource management research and innovation, to gender equality, and to tertiary education.
- Professor Julie-Anne Elizabeth Leask – For distinguished service to health and medical research, to policy advice, and to enhancing community understanding of immunisation.
- Dr Lindy Lee – For distinguished service to contemporary visual arts as a sculptor and painter, and to arts administration through leadership roles.
- Emeritus Professor Helen Marian Lochhead – For distinguished service to architecture and urban design, to building regulation reform, to tertiary education, and to professional organisations.
- James Andrew MacKenzie – For distinguished service to business, and to public administration through leadership roles.
- The late Reverend Robert John Maguire, AM, RFD – For distinguished service to the community, particularly through social welfare initiatives and organisations.
- The late Dr Peter John Maher – For distinguished service to gynaecological medicine, to medical research and education, and to professional societies.
- Conjoint Associate Professor Sally McCarthy – For distinguished service to emergency medicine, and to professional associations through leadership roles.
- Emeritus Professor Peter Francis McDonald, AM – For distinguished service to demographic research, to policy development, and to professional associations.
- The Honourable John Roderick McKechnie, KC – For distinguished service to the law, to the judiciary, and to the community of Western Australia.
- Dr Richard John Mills, AM – For distinguished service to the performing arts as a composer, conductor and artistic director.
- Dr Cynthia Alison Mitchell – For distinguished service to the environment through water resource sustainability as an innovator, leader and academic.
- Gregory Lawrence Moriarty – For distinguished service to public administration in leadership roles, particularly in national and international security.
- David Damien Parer – For distinguished service to wildlife cinematography, to literature as an author, and to the environment.
- Professor Sarah Anne Robertson – For distinguished service to medical research, particularly reproductive biology and immunology, and to professional societies.
- Distinguished Professor Louise Marie Ryan – For distinguished service to biostatistical research and methodology, to environmental science, and to professional societies.
- Dr Brett Sutton – For distinguished service to the people of Victoria through public health administration and governance, and to medicine.
- Emeritus Professor Deborah Gale Theodoros – For distinguished service to community health, to rehabilitation sciences, and to tertiary education.
- Professor Joseph Albert Trapani – For distinguished service to medical research, particularly immunology and the development of immune-based cancer therapies, and to the community.
- Dr Grahame John Webb – For distinguished service to environmental conservation, and to wildlife preservation, particularly crocodiles.
- Winthrop Professor Fiona Melanie Wood, AM – For distinguished service to plastic and reconstructive surgery, to medical research, and as clinician scientist and mentor.

==== Military Division ====
Air Force

- Air Marshal Robert Timothy Chipman, AM, CSC – For distinguished service in responsible positions as Australia’s Military Representative to the North Atlantic Treaty Organisation; and as Head of Military Strategic Commitments Branch.

=== Member of the Order of Australia (AM) ===
==== General Division ====
- Professor Arthur Bruce Abernethy – For significant service to education in the field of health and behavioural science.
- Francis Roger Acquah – For significant service to mental health care, and to the community.
- Lynette Gail Adamson – For significant service to the Indigenous community, and to business.
- Pamela Kay Allen – For significant service to literature as an author.
- Elizabeth Rhonda Ansiewicz – For significant service to the community, particularly through social welfare groups.
- Varvara Athanasiou-Ioannou – For significant service to the community, particularly through inclusion and diversity initiatives, in a range of roles.
- Professor Kirsten Anne Auret – For significant service to palliative care medicine, and to tertiary education.
- Dr Richard John Bailey – For significant service to medicine in the field of anesthetics, and to professional societies.
- Associate Professor Barbara Baird – For significant service to community health through pro-choice advocacy, and to tertiary education.
- John Russell Baker, ESM – For significant service to surf lifesaving, to veterans, and to the community.
- Janine Barrand – For significant service to the museum, arts and cultural sector.
- Associate Professor Felix Cornelius Behan – For significant service to medicine, particularly reconstructive surgery.
- Lorraine Helen Berends – For significant service to the financial and business sectors, and to the community.
- Neil Graeme Bibby, AFSM – For significant service to the community through emergency service organisations.
- Dallas Wayne Booth – For significant service to the insurance industry, and to the community.
- Emeritus Professor Leigh Alexander Burgoyne – For significant service to science, particularly through the development of DNA technologies.
- Michael Bushell – For significant service to sports administration through a range of roles.
- Stephen William Callister – For significant service to community, particularly men's health.
- Cressida Rosemary Campbell – For significant service to the visual arts.
- Adrian Samuel Carson – For significant service to Indigenous health through research and development programs.
- Emily Carter – For significant service to the Indigenous community through social and economic advocacy and initiatives.
- Douglas Scott Chapman – For significant service to the community of Victoria through a range of governance roles.
- Dr Hayley Emma Christian – For significant service to children's health through policy development and research.
- Clinical Associate Professor Matthew Chu – For significant service to emergency medicine, and to professional associations.
- Conjoint Professor Jacqueline Close – For significant service to medical research, and to medicine as an orthogeriatrician.
- Dr Sandra Eleyn Close – For significant service to the mining and resources sector, and to women as an equal opportunity pioneer and advocate, and to professional associations.
- Ellie Victoria Cole, OAM – For significant service to sport as an advocate for diversity and inclusion.
- Dr Robert Robin Cooke, OAM – For significant service to pathology, and to professional organisations.
- Brigid Anne Coombe – For significant service to community health, particularly through advocacy to improve abortion care access.
- Joan Cordell – For significant service to business, and to the community.
- Professor Kim Cornish – For significant service to tertiary education, to psychological science, and to the community.
- Joanne Charlotte Crawford – For significant service to women's rights, to gender equality, and to international development.
- Emeritus Professor Dudley Cecil Creagh – For significant service to science, and to tertiary education.
- Heather Ann Croall – For significant service to the performing arts, as an administrator, advocate and film maker.
- Mark Anthony Cubit – For significant service to the community through charitable organisations.
- Jennifer Ann Cullen – For significant service to people with disability, and to the community through a range of roles.
- Diana D'Ambra – For significant service to the finance and banking industry as a mentor and director.
- Susanne Dahn – For significant service to business, to the finance sector, and to the community.
- Bettina Danganbarr – For significant service to the Indigenous community of Arnhem Land.
- Anastasia Darras – For significant service to community health, particularly to ill children and their families.
- Julia Helen Davison – For significant service to children, to youth, and to the community.
- Dr Grahame Bruce Douglas – For significant service to the community through bushfire governance, research and mentoring roles.
- Conjoint Professor Tracy Elizabeth Dudding-Byth – For significant service to medical research, particularly genetics, and to the community.
- Peter Ian Duras – For significant service to sports physiotherapy, and to the community.
- Bronwyn Elizabeth Edinger – For significant service to the performing arts through administrative roles.
- Margaret Leonie Edmond – For significant service to architecture, to tertiary education, and to professional organisations.
- Dr Judith Mary Edwards – For significant service to the people and Parliament of Western Australia, and to the community.
- Associate Professor Ngaire Joy Elwood – For significant service to medicine, particularly through stem cell research.
- Dr Dorothy Erickson – For significant service to jewellery design, and to the arts in Western Australia.
- Emeritus Professor Michael John Eyles – For significant service to tertiary education, and to science.
- Dr June Factor – For significant service to literature, to history, and to the community.
- Sylvia Faram – For significant service to cricket administration, and to hockey.
- Professor Steven Faux – For significant service to rehabilitation medicine, and to medical research.
- Ronald David Ferster – For significant service to the community through a range of organisations.
- Loreta Giuseppina Fin – For significant service to music, to education, and to professional associations.
- Dr Robin Beryl Fitzsimons – For significant service to tertiary education, to neurology, and to medical research.
- Dr Vicki Jane Flenady – For significant service to medical research, particularly in the field of perinatal mortality.
- John Gregory Foreman, OAM – For significant service to the performing arts, particularly music, and to the community.
- Penelope Anne Fowler – For significant service to the community through a range of organisations.
- Dr Jane Graeme Fox – For significant service to medicine, particularly as a breast surgeon, researcher and educator.
- Robert Bernard French – For significant service to the LGBTIQA+ community, and to history preservation.
- Catherine Tamara Fritz-Kalish – For significant service to the corporate sector through developing public policy.
- Carmen Anne Garcia – For significant service to the multicultural community through diversity and inclusion advocacy and programs.
- Professor Gail Garvey – For significant service to Indigenous health, and cancer research.
- Helen Edith Geard – For significant service to youth, and to the community.
- Emeritus Professor Carolyn Louise Geczy – For significant service to immunology and vascular biology as a researcher and academic.
- Professor Julian Colin Gold – For significant service to medicine as a clinical epidemiologist and researcher, and to community health.
- Amanda Gome – For significant service to media, to business, and to women.
- Virginia Elizabeth Gordon – For significant service to the arts, and to the community.
- Ashleigh Quentin Gore – For significant service to the community through a range of roles.
- Laureate Professor Jennifer Mary Gore – For significant service to tertiary education.
- Dr Jennifer Ann Gowan – For significant service to medicine as a pharmacist, to professional societies, and to community health.
- Dr Jennifer Helen Gray, PSM – For significant service to wildlife management, and to zoological industry organisations.
- Jordan Green – For significant service to business, particularly through Angel investing, and to professional associations.
- Emeritus Professor Roy Herbert Green – For significant service to business, and to tertiary education in the fields of science, technology and innovation.
- Associate Professor Graham John Gumley – For significant service to medicine in the field of orthopaedics.
- Dr Roger Owen Gurr – For significant service to mental health research and initiatives, and to the community.
- Distinguished Professor Anna Elizabeth Haebich – For significant service to literature as an author, historian and academic.
- Sharon Anne Hanlon – For significant service to the community through a range of organisations and leadership roles.
- Dr Ian James Hardingham, KC – For significant service to the law and legal reform in Victoria.
- Emeritus Professor Ross Rudesch Harley – For significant service to tertiary education, and to the arts through a range of roles.
- Clinical Professor Paul Robert Harnett – For significant service to oncology as a clinician and researcher.
- Professor Anthony Walter Harris – For significant service to mental health as a clinician and academic.
- Steven Graeme Harris – For significant service to print journalism.
- Associate Professor Carmel Mary Hawley – For significant service to kidney medicine as a researcher, clinician and mentor.
- John (Jack) William Heath – For significant service to community health, and to social welfare.
- Dr Natasha Hendrick – For significant service to youth, and to earth sciences.
- Avril Cathrine Henry – For significant service to business consultancy, project management, and to women.
- Professor Charlotte Mary Hespe – For significant service to general medicine as a practitioner, academic and mentor.
- Emerita Professor Lesley Patricia Hitchens – For significant service to tertiary education, and to the law.
- Robert Ashley Hoff – For significant service to primary education, and to professional associations.
- Geoffrey William Hone – For significant service to the legal profession, and to charitable and educational foundations.
- Dr Evelyn Johanna Hovenga – For significant service to medicine through health informatics, and digital transformation.
- Dr Patricia Ann Hutchings – For significant service to marine science, and to environmental conservation.
- David William Hynes – For significant service to sports administration, and to baseball.
- Distinguished Professor Buddhima Indraratna – For significant service to civil engineering, particularly through infrastructure development, ground improvement and transportation geotechnics.
- John Irving – For significant service to the arts, and to business.
- Gregory Joseph Johnson – For significant service to community health through diabetes governance, reform and education.
- Matthew Kayrooz – For significant service to the community through social welfare initiatives, and to the insurance sector.
- Caroline Kelly – For significant service to the community through awareness and research funding for pancreatic cancer.
- Beverley Joy Kerr – For significant service to the community through social welfare programs.
- David Barry Kerrigan – For significant service to volunteer and social welfare organisations, and regional rugby league.
- Dr Mary Lindsay Kille – For significant service to public health, and to the community.
- Associate Professor Nicola Mary Kilpatrick – For significant service to dentistry through a range of roles and associations.
- Peter Joseph Kirkwood – For significant service to surf life saving through international, national and local roles.
- Emeritus Professor Hilton John Kobus – For significant service to forensic science through governance and administrative roles.
- David James Koch – For significant service to media as a television presenter, and to economic journalism.
- Professor Kelvin Matthew Kong – For significant service to medicine as an Otolaryngologist, and to Indigenous health.
- Christine Kotur – For significant service to education, and to the community of Victoria.
- Dr Gerald Kuchling – For significant service to turtle research, preservation and conservation.
- Max Lambert – For significant service to music, and to the performing arts.
- The late Emeritus Professor Adrian Lee – For significant service to tertiary education, to microbiology, and to professional organisations.
- The Reverend Canon Professor Dorothy Ann Lee – For significant service to the Anglican Church of Australia.
- Dr Michael Beckett Leigh – For significant service to tertiary education, and to Australian-Asian relations.
- Peter John Lewinsky – For significant service to the community, to public administration, and to business.
- Jimy Liaskos – For significant service to business and to industry as a leader and mentor.
- Peta Maree Libby – For significant service to the mining and natural resources industry, and to the community.
- Kate Jill Llewellyn – For significant service to literature as an author and poet.
- Peter Ernest Lowry, OAM – For significant service to the community through a range of roles and organisations.
- Emeritus Professor Christian Joseph Lueck – For significant service to neurology and neuro-ophthalmology through medical research and clinical practice.
- Dr Helen Louise MacGillivray – For significant service to mathematics and statistics education.
- Jeffrey Douglas Maclean – For significant service to the community through a range of organisations.
- Benedict George Maguire – For significant service to veteran rehabilitation and support, and to the community.
- Professor Christopher Gerard Maher – For significant service to physiotherapy as a researcher, clinician and mentor, particularly in the field of pain management.
- Margaret Anne Martin – For significant service to nursing and midwifery, particularly through education.
- Robert James Masters – For significant service the marketing and communications sector, and to charitable organisations.
- Christina Matthews – For significant service to cricket as a player and administrator, and to women.
- The late Dr James Richard May – For significant service to mining research and governance, and to the community.
- Professor Alexander Broadfoot McBratney – For significant service to soil science through research and education, and to the development of digital mapping techniques.
- The Honourable Sheila Margaret McHale – For significant service to the people and Parliament of Western Australia, and to the community.
- Professor Neal William Menzies – For significant service to science, and to tertiary education.
- Professor Brett Gerard Mitchell – For significant service to nursing, particularly infection prevention and control.
- Nicholas Stephen Moore – For significant service to the aquaculture sector.
- Lyn Morgain – For significant service to the community through a range of organisations.
- Her Honour Chief Judge Elizabeth Jane Morris – For significant service to the law in the Northern Territory, and to the community.
- Associate Professor Julie Ann Mundy – For significant service to medicine, particularly cardiothoracic surgery, and to professional associations.
- Helen Margot Murray – For significant service to the community, particularly as a social worker and educator.
- Patricia Neely – For significant service to community health, and to the community.
- Sarah Kathleen Neill – For significant service to youth, and to the community.
- Dr Matthew Vincent O'Sullivan – For significant service to medicine, particularly in the field of infectious diseases.
- The late Dr Annette Cleo Pantle – For significant service to medical administration, and to professional organisations.
- Dr Helen Elizabeth Parker – For significant service to health science and physical education.
- Professor Donna Lee Pendergast – For significant service to tertiary education.
- Mildren Teresa Penny – For significant service to the Indigenous community through a range of roles.
- Elizabeth Ann Perron – For significant service to the charitable sector; and to the community.
- Richard John Persse – For significant service to public administration, and to the community of South Australia.
- The Honourable Dr Brian Patrick Pezzutti, CSC, RFD – For significant service to the Parliament of New South Wales, and to community health.
- Ronald Geoffrey Pickford – For significant service to the building design sector, and to the community in a range of roles.
- Dr Gordon Henry Pike – For significant service to engineering, and to the aerospace industry.
- The late Jonathan Solomon Pinshaw – For significant service to business, and to the Jewish community.
- Emeritus Professor Adrian Laird Polglase – For significant service to medicine as a surgeon, researcher and educator.
- Douglas Porter – For significant service to education, and to the Anglican Church in Australia.
- Richard Charles Potok – For significant service to the Indigenous community, to education, and to the law.
- Dr John Alan Ramshaw – For significant service to research science, to professional societies, and to the community.
- The Honourable Justice Grant Theo Riethmuller – For significant service to the judiciary, and to the law.
- Professor Paul Roach – For significant service to nuclear medicine, and to medical research.
- Lenore Elizabeth Robertson – For significant service to the community, and to the arts.
- Jane Anne Sanders – For significant service to the law, particularly youth justice.
- The late Emeritus Professor William Hugh Sawyer – For significant service to tertiary education, and to biochemistry.
- Lynne Schickert – For significant service to sport, and to the community.
- Suzanna Sheed – For significant service to the people and Parliament of Victoria, and to the community.
- Her Excellency Harinder Kaur Sidhu – For significant service to public administration, and to foreign affairs.
- Clinical Associate Professor Judith Skinner (Kirk) – For significant service to medicine, and to medical research, particularly in the field of cancer genetics.
- Ivan Roman Slavich – For significant service to business, and to the community through governance and philanthropic endeavours.
- Linda Marilyn Sorrell – For significant service to health administration through a range of roles.
- Alan John Sparks, AM, BEM – For significant service to apprenticeship and vocational training, and to veterans.
- Raymond John Spencer – For significant service to business, and to the community through a range of organisations.
- Colin Robert Steele – For significant service to librarianship, and to digital information sharing.
- Dr Michael Richard Stephens – For significant service to primary industry, and to the community.
- Dr Nicholas James Stephenson – For significant service to medicine, and to medical imaging training.
- Mark Anthony Stickells – For significant service to science, particularly information technology, and to the community.
- Shirley Ann Stokes – For significant service to rowing, and to people with disability.
- The Honourable Dr Sharman Nancy Stone – For significant service to the people and Parliament of Australia, and to the community through executive positions.
- Patricia Muriel Strahan – For significant service to the tourism industry, and to the community of Western Australia.
- Heather Lorraine Stringer – For significant service to youth in Victoria.
- Sandra Lee Sully – For significant service to the media, to charitable organisations, and to the community.
- Dr Brett Anthony Summerell – For significant service to the environment through plant pathology and mycology.
- Diana Clare Taylor – For significant service to Australian rules football, and to the community of Geelong.
- Dr John Joseph Taylor – For significant service to architecture, to heritage conservation, and to professional organisations.
- Associate Professor David Henry Thomson – For significant service to dentistry, particularly in the field of prosthodontics.
- The late Sophie Jessica Trevitt – For significant service to social justice, and to human rights protection for youth and Indigenous people.
- Beverley Anne Trivett – For significant service to community health through brain cancer research.
- Clinical Associate Professor Kathleen Elizabeth Tymms – For significant service to rheumatology, and to professional associations.
- Mary Bernadette Uzelac – For significant service to the community of the Barwon South West Region.
- Dr John Taber Vallance – For significant service to education, to library services and programs, and to the arts.
- Professor Glenda Maria Wardle – For significant service to science in the field of ecology and evolution.
- Emeritus Professor John Dennis Wark – For significant service to medicine, particularly endocrinology, as a clinician, educator, and mentor.
- Dr Muriel Emmeline Watt – For significant service to the photovoltaic and renewable energy sector.
- John Reginald Williams – For significant service to the Parliament of Australia, and to the community.
- Her Honour Judge Wendy Anne Wilmoth – For significant service to the judiciary, and to the law.

==== Military Division ====
Navy

- Rear Admiral Matthew Paul Buckley, CSC, RAN – For exceptional service in senior leadership roles within the Royal Australian Navy.
- Commodore Peter James Leavy, CSM, RAN – For exceptional service to the Australian Defence Force in senior command positions.

Army

- Brigadier David Charles Hafner, CSC – For exceptional service in the field of Army Aviation operations and capability management.
- Major General Jason Kyle Walk – For exceptional service to the Australian Defence Force in strategic logistics, operations support and sustainment.

Air Force

- Group Captain David John Clyde, CSM – For exceptional service in development and realisation of cyberspace capabilities for the Royal Australian Air Force.
- Group Captain Dennis Davison – For exceptional service in Space capability development for Australia and its allies.
- Air Commodore Gretchen Elizabeth Fryar – For exceptional service in Personnel Management and International Engagement for the Australian Defence Force.
- Air Commodore Anthony John Hindmarsh, CSC – For exceptional service in Personnel Capability Management and organisational sustainment for the Royal Australian Air Force.
- Group Captain Hannah Louise Jude-Smith – For exceptional service in intelligence capability development, strategic planning and international relations for the Australian Defence Force.

==== Honorary ====
- Colin Hiscoe – For significant service to people with a disability through advocacy roles.
- Emeritus Professor Gisela Kaplan – For significant service to science education through research into animal behaviour.
- Sharon McGowan – For significant service to community health, particularly stroke prevention and awareness.
- Professor Deborah Parker – For significant service to community health, particularly through palliative and aged care research.

=== Medal of the Order of Australia (OAM) ===
==== General Division ====
- Majida Abboud-Saab – For service to the Arab community, and to the media.
- Belinda Maree Adams – For service to community health.
- Julie Rose Adams – For service to pharmaceutical oncology.
- Richard Shane Adams – For service to the community of Mogo.
- George Albert Adler – For service to the community through a range of organisations.
- Michael John Aitken – For service to optometry.
- Nasiba Akram-Haidari – For service to humanitarian organisations.
- Barbara Cecilia Alderton – For service to the community through a range of roles.
- Victor Alhadeff – For service to the Jewish community, and to the media.
- Angela Altair – For service to the community, and to local government.
- Geraldine Joy Anderson – For service to vocational education.
- Stephanie Joy Armstrong – For service to Indigenous health and education.
- Francis (Frank) Neville Avis – For service to broadcast media, particularly radio.
- Peter Bacha – For service to football, and to the community.
- Fiona Bamford-Bracher – For service to community radio.
- Dr John (Jack) Peter Bana – For service to tertiary education.
- William Ernest Barber – For service to the community of Parkes.
- Graeme Wilfrid Barker, RFD – For service to the communities of Port Sorrell and Penguin.
- Dr Jennifer Joan Barnes – For service to the performing arts through opera, and to the community.
- Rodney Harold Barnes – For service to music, and to the community.
- Heather Lorraine Barrie – For service to the communities of Cobram and Moira.
- Councillor Victor Edward Bartley – For service to local government, and to the community of Bourke.
- David Alexander Bean – For service to secondary education, and to rowing.
- Dr Starlette Anne Beaumont (Isaacs) – For service to medicine, and to community health.
- Penelope Anne Becchio – For service to the community through a range of organisations.
- Neville Charles Begg – For service to horse racing as a trainer.
- George Belperio – For service to the Italian community of South Australia.
- Adrian Joseph Bendt – For service to music as a violinist and choir master.
- Dr Joan Benjamin – For service to tertiary education.
- Craig Bennett – For service to broadcast media as an entertainment journalist.
- Associate Professor Ian James Bickerton – For service to tertiary education, and to mental health support organisations.
- Daryl Bruce Binning – For service to the film industry.
- George Leslie Bird – For service to the community of Wonthaggi.
- Mary Kaye Blackburn – For service to the community of Ararat.
- Graeme Leonard Bland – For service to veterans.
- John Stephen Bligh – For service to Australian rules football.
- Judith Anne Blyth – For service to conservation and the environment.
- Connie Boglis – For service to mental health reform, to veterans, and to the community.
- Arch Boonen – For service to the community through a range of roles.
- Anne Michele Bootes – For service to surf lifesaving.
- Sheree Anne Bourke – For service to education.
- Elizabeth Murray Bourne – For service to orienteering, and to conservation and the environment.
- Suzanne Marion Bowen – For service to women, and to dragon boating.
- Rosie Anne Boylan – For service to the creative arts as a milliner.
- Terri Rae Brabon – For service to the theatrical arts.
- Clover Dawn Bradley – For service to the community through a range of organisations.
- Laraine Brennan – For service to the community through a range of roles.
- Paul Brophy – For service to aged welfare, and to the community.
- Joan Dorothy Brotherton – For service to lawn bowls.
- Bronwyn Alice Brown – For service to the community through music.
- Vicki Lynnette Brown – For service to education, and to the community.
- Dr Paul David Browning – For service to education.
- Valda Alice Brunker – For service to netball, and to the community.
- Roslyn Bryant – For service to the community through a range of roles.
- Patricia Mae Bull – For service to the community through social welfare organisations.
- Noel Mervyn Bultitude – For service to the community of Woolgoolga.
- Dennis Burgess – For service to the performing arts, and to the music industry.
- The late Maxwell Mckay Burnet – For service to the community through a range of roles.
- Christine Florence Butters – For service to the community through music and sport.
- Andrew Holden Buttfield – For service to Australian and international Indigenous communities.
- Wayne Geoffrey Buttner – For service to the print media, and to the community.
- Louise Elizabeth Buxton – For service to aged care.
- Raymond Valentine Byrnes – For service to the community of Yungaburra.
- Dr Ian Bruce Cameron, RFD – For service to medicine, and to community music.
- Maria Stella Cameron – For service to veterans, and to the community.
- Fiona Campbell – For service to the performing arts through music.
- Hume Kenneth Campbell – For service to the maritime industry.
- Mervyn Allan Cann – For service to the community through a range of organisations.
- Shirley Ann Cann – For service to the community through a range of roles.
- Daphne Maud Cantrill – For service to lawn bowls, and to hockey.
- Heather Ruth Carr – For service to athletics.
- Patrick Francis Carroll – For service to community health, and to athletics.
- Daphne Muriel Carswell – For service to the community of Wagga Wagga.
- Carlsa Joyce Carter – For service to conservation and the environment.
- Margaret Lorna Carty – For service to athletics.
- Ellen Diane Casimaty – For service to the museums and galleries sector.
- David John Chalk – For service to veterans and their families, and to the community.
- Eric Charles Chaplin – For service to veterans, and to the community.
- John Clifford Chapman – For service to public administration in South Australia.
- Janette Leanne Child – For service to community health.
- Peter George Christopher – For service to community history.
- Eddie Chung – For service to the community through social welfare organisations, and to business.
- Kerry Francis Clancy – For service to surf lifesaving.
- James Andrew Claven – For service to veterans, and to community history.
- Nicole Louise Cleary – For service to animal welfare.
- Councillor Janet Louise Clifford – For service to women in local government, and to the community of the Whitsundays.
- Cyril David Cockshell – For service to the community through a range of organisations, and to geophysics.
- Catherine Margaret Cole – For service to surf lifesaving, and to the community.
- Associate Professor Allen-John Edward Collins – For service to medicine through a range of roles.
- Joan Elizabeth Common – For service to the community of Ulverstone.
- John Francis Compton – For service to the community of Yungaburra.
- Lois Evelyn Congram – For service to veterans and their families, and to the community.
- Joy Lynette Connor – For service to the community through social welfare organisations.
- Roberta Louise Conroy – For service to the community of the Northern Beaches of Sydney.
- Michael Francis Cooper – For service to community sport.
- Leon Francis Costermans – For service to conservation and the environment.
- Claire Frances Cotter – For service to people with disability.
- Isaac Te Ao Cotter – For service to the Maori community of Australia and New Zealand.
- Margaret Covi – For service to bushwalking.
- Kyira Louise Cox – For service to softball.
- John Graham Craig – For service to cricket.
- Raymond Cronin – For service to aviation.
- Elizabeth Anne Crummy – For service to youth, and to the community.
- Pastor Philip Milton Cutcliffe – For service to the community, particularly through the church.
- Richard Patrick Dalton – For service to the law, and to the community.
- Elizabeth Jan Dawes – For service to the community through social welfare organisations.
- Jill Maree Dawson – For service to the community through a range of roles.
- The late Beth Mary Dayton – For service to the museum and galleries sector.
- Professor Barbora de Courten – For service to medical research, and to healthcare.
- Arthur De Main – For service to equestrian sports.
- Cheryl Maree Dedman – For service to community health.
- Mihiri Dissanayake – For service to Sri Lankan community of Victoria.
- Elizabeth Anne Docksey, APM – For service to police veterans.
- Major Graham William Docksey, OAM (Retd) – For service to the community of Albury, and to veterans.
- Anne Rochelle Doherty – For service to medical administration, and to the community.
- Marea Ellen Donovan – For service to the Catholic Church of Australia.
- Terrence William Donovan – For service to the community, particularly Indigenous health.
- Raymond Paul Dorsett – For service to hockey.
- Elias Doufas – For service to the Greek community of Victoria.
- Councillor De-Anne Douglas – For service to the community of Muswellbrook.
- Vivienne Jean Drew – For service to gliding.
- Jeffrey Dry – For service to community sport, and to the church.
- Donisha Marie Duff – For service to the community through a range of organisations.
- Linda Irene Duncombe – For service to the financial sector.
- Colin Robert Dunn – For service to the community of Pambula, and to education.
- Susan Constance Dunn – For service to the community of the New England region.
- Tanya Dupagne – For service to youth, and to the community.
- Gail Margaret Eastaway – For service to the print media, and to the community.
- John Gilbert Ebbott – For service to the community through a range of organisations.
- Denise Leane Edwards – For service to business.
- Dr Barry Elsey – For service to tertiary education.
- Dr Vivienne Elton – For service to psychiatry, and to the community.
- Alan Douglas Evers-Buckland – For service to the community through a range of roles.
- Kylie Anne Facer – For service to community health.
- Matthew Fargher – For service to the performing arts, particularly through music.
- Dr Sabrin Farooqui – For service to the community, and to multicultural affairs.
- Dr Glendon Betts Farrow – For service to military medicine and patient safety.
- Michael Bernard Fay – For service to international relations, and to education.
- Vincent John Feeney – For service to secondary education.
- Rosslyn Denise Ferguson-Pelley – For service to the community through a range of organisations.
- Fernando Ferrante – For service to the community through a range of organisations.
- Dr Benjamin James Field – For service to osteopathy.
- Trevor James Fisher – For service to the community of Busselton.
- Peter Michael Fitze – For service to the community through a range of organisations.
- Dr Barry Charles Fitzgerald – For service to the community of Buninyong.
- Christine Lempick Fitzherbert – For service to the community through a range of organisations.
- Kevin Michael Fitzpatrick – For service to the community through a range of roles.
- Eric George Flood – For service to veterans and their families.
- Dr Margaret Anne Folkard – For service to gnomonics, and to the community.
- Leila Doris Forde – For service to community health.
- Delys Elaine Forrest – For service to the community of Busselton.
- Garry Fowler – For service to the community through a range of organisations.
- Guy Stuart Fowler – For service to business, and to the community.
- Lynette Edith Franklin – For service to the community in a range of roles.
- Dr Peter Charles Frederiksen – For service to dermatology.
- George Lawrence Freund – For service to the Jewish community of Sydney.
- John Norman Gallimore – For service to business, and to the community.
- Sally Gamble – For service to education, and to the community.
- Alexander Garlin – For service to veterans and their families.
- Lesley Pamela Gaspar – For service to the Jewish community of Victoria.
- Peter Stephan Gaspar – For service to the Jewish community of Victoria.
- Glenys Annette Gayfer – For service to the community through charitable initiatives.
- Marjorie Ann Gerlinger – For service to the community through a range of roles.
- Professor Michelle Giles – For service to medicine.
- Reverend Patrick Joseph Gillespie – For service to youth through school-based sport programs.
- Eris Daniel Gleeson – For service to the community of the Hilltops region.
- John Edward Glennon – For service to veterans and their families, and to the community.
- Flavia Gobbo – For service to business, and to public administration.
- Ian Malcolm Goldfinch – For service to the community of Ravensthorpe.
- Richenda Janey Goldfinch – For service to the community of Ravensthorpe.
- Lynese Elizabeth Goldie – For service to veterans and their families.
- Gary Marsden Golding – For service to science in the field of chemistry.
- Ivan Roy Golding – For service to speedway racing.
- Dr David Angus Goldsmith – For service to dentistry, and to the community.
- Merrilyn Jay Gollan – For service to the agricultural show sector.
- Adrian John Gorman – For service to the community of Balranald.
- Zoe Jean Goss – For service to cricket.
- Graeme Alexander Grant – For service to the finance and superannuation sectors.
- Robert Hugh Grant – For service to local government, and to the community.
- Gordon Wilson Gray – For service to the community through a range of organisations.
- The late Brian Green – For service to the community in a range of roles and organisations.
- Frank Greenstein – For service to the community through political engagement.
- David Maynard Greenwood – For service to the performing arts, and to business.
- Barbara Denise Grove – For service to youth through Girl Guides.
- Elisabeth Frances Grove – For service to the community of Hobsons Bay.
- Georgina Sarah Gubbins – For service to primary industry, and to the community.
- Dr Ronald Barry Hacker – For service to primary industry, and conservation.
- Councillor Mazhar Hadid – For service to the community of Liverpool.
- Jane Catherine Haley – For service to the arts through administrative roles.
- Evelyn Marie Halls – For service to sports administration, and to fencing.
- Jacqueline Margaret Happ – For service to the community through a range of organisations.
- Jen Hargrave – For service to people with disability, and to the community.
- Isabel May Harkensee – For service to the community through a range of organisations.
- Christopher Patrick Harper – For service to sailing.
- John Derek Harper – For service to community health.
- Professor Paul David Harpur – For service to people with disability.
- Dr Suzanne Margaret Harrison – For service to rural medicine.
- Lisa Hasker – For service to sports administration.
- David Charles Hatherly – For service to the community of the Australian Capital Territory.
- Margaret-Anne Hayes – For service to the community through a range of charitable organisations.
- Yvonne Hazell – For service to the community through a range of roles.
- The late Roy Maxwell Hazlewood – For service to the Anglican Church of Australia.
- Warwick John Heckendorf – For service to the community of Narrandera.
- Paul Anthony Hede – For service to architecture, and to the community.
- Darrell Raymond Hegarty – For service to veterans.
- Klaus Friedrich Helms – For service to the Indigenous community of the Northern Territory.
- Pascale Annelise Helyar-Moray – For service to business, and to women's affairs.
- Wendy Joy Hewitt – For service to the community of Warracknabeal, and to education.
- Stephen James Hewson – For service to rugby league.
- Johan Peter Hietbrink – For service to the community of the Northern Tablelands region.
- Noel Arthur Hiffernan – For service to people with disability, and to the community.
- Peter Raymond Hille – For service to the community through a range of organisations.
- Robert Ian Hirst – For service to oenology, and to industry associations.
- Peter Alexander Hodge – For service to architecture, and to the community.
- Dr Brian Arthur Hoepper – For service to education.
- Dr Andrew James Hogan – For service to the community of Seymour.
- Michael John Holland – For service to the community through emergency response organisations.
- Dionne Honeychurch – For service to community health.
- The late Anthony Ronald Hope – For service to the mining industry, and to Australia-China relations.
- Dr Ian Michael Hosegood – For service to aerospace medicine.
- Janette Kerry Hyde – For service to the community of Port Macquarie.
- Clinical Associate Professor Jenny Louise Hynson – For service to palliative care medicine.
- Gary Mark Inberg – For service to the Jewish community of New South Wales, and to business.
- Elizabeth Rosanne Ivimey – For service to medicine, particularly nursing.
- Adrian Bernard Jackson – For service to the community, particularly through the church.
- Caroline Mary Jackson – For service to language education.
- Peta Elizabeth Jamieson – For service to community health, and to business.
- Councillor Mary-Lou Jarvis – For service to local government, and to the community.
- Tonina Rochelle Joel – For service to the community through social welfare initiatives.
- Robert Andrew Johnson – For service to the community through a range of roles.
- Councillor Winston Evans Johnston – For service to local government, and to the community of the Sunshine Coast.
- The late Geoffrey Colin Jones – For service to the community of Mildura.
- William Richard Jones – For service to the community through a range of organisations.
- Anna Clare Jones-Speedie – For service to local government, and to the community of Wodonga.
- Ruth Katherine Judd – For service to the international community through medical aid programs.
- Dr Ramananda Kamath – For service to paediatric gastroenterology.
- Sarkis Chahine Karam – For service to the Lebanese community of Sydney.
- Brian Francis Keenan – For service to the community of Yarrawonga.
- The late Mary Isabel Kell – For service to the community through a range of volunteer roles.
- Rosemary Elsie Kennett – For service to the community of Numurkah.
- Barbara Helene Kessel – For service to the community through social welfare organisations.
- Steven John Kidd – For service to the theatre, and to education.
- Professor Dudley John Kingsnorth – For service to mining, and to the community.
- Anne Bell Knight – For service to the arts.
- Dr Anne Therese Knight – For service to medicine through a range of roles.
- Sandra Elizabeth Knight – For service to people who are blind or have low vision.
- Devorah Anne Komesaroff – For service to the Jewish community of Victoria.
- Colin Henry Krycer – For service to the LGBTIQ community.
- Dr Tamara Kwarteng – For service to the Pacific islands through public health programs.
- Joanne Kwok – For service to the youth, and to the community of Bayside.
- The late Dr Sachint Kumar Lal – For service to tertiary education, and to the community.
- Loc Huu Lam – For service to the Vietnamese community of Victoria.
- Jennifer Kay Lambert – For service to business.
- Winsome Kathlyn Lambkin – For service to conservation and the environment.
- Dr Johanna Lammersma – For service to the community through a range of roles.
- Bilawara Lee – For service to the Indigenous community of the Northern Territory.
- Nicole Lee – For service to people with disability, and to women.
- Donald Charles Leeson – For service to youth, and to the community.
- Dianne Leggo – For service to women through Zonta International.
- Peter Leondaritis – For service to the Greek community of New South Wales.
- Kathleen Letch – For service to the broadcast media, particularly to community radio.
- Peter Derek Levi – For service to business, and to the community.
- Anthony Terrence Lewis – For service to sport, and to the community of Bathurst.
- Robert Lions – For service to the community through a range of roles.
- Jayne Lloyd – For service to the community through social welfare organisations.
- Joyce Gertrude Loas – For service to the community of the Newcastle region.
- Dr Virginia Grace Longley – For service to medicine as a General Practitioner.
- Dr Christine Anne Longman – For service to medicine through a range of roles.
- Sue-Ellen Lovett – For service to horse sports, and to the community.
- Julie Katherine Low – For service to the community of the Lower Eyre Peninsula.
- Desmond James Lum – For service to the communities of Holbrook and Thurgoona.
- Warren Joseph Lupica – For service to surf lifesaving.
- Associate Professor Zarnie Lwin – For service to medicine in the field of neuro-oncology.
- William Maxwell Lyle – For service to the creative arts as a sculptor.
- Rachael Anne Lynch – For service to hockey.
- Dawn Lorraine Macdonald – For service to golf, and to the community.
- Marina Jane Maguire – For service to veterans, and to the community.
- Lois Pearl Maiden – For service to primary and early childhood education.
- Lorraine Gwenyth Mairinger – For service to the community through a range of organisations.
- Nicholas Maksymow – For service to the Russian community of Sydney.
- Christine Male – For service to the community through disaster response roles.
- John Male – For service to the community through disaster response roles.
- Professor Clifford John Mallett – For service to sport as a coach, and to tertiary education.
- Joyce May Marshall – For service to the community through a range of roles.
- Kathleen Marshall – For service to the Indigenous community of Mount Isa.
- Kenneth Brian Martin – For service to community music.
- Dr Kuruvilla Mathew – For service to tertiary education, and to the community.
- Jeffrey Grant Maurice – For service to veterans, and to business.
- Florence Tafadzwa Mauwa – For service to women, and to the African community of Victoria.
- Valrie Morris Mayger – For service to equestrian sports.
- David Philip McCabe – For service to the community of Wangaratta.
- Arthur John McCarroll – For service to community sport, particularly through surf lifesaving.
- Dr Christine Anne McConnell – For service to medicine through a range of roles.
- Dr Judith Marilyn McKay – For service to the museums and galleries sector.
- Robert Edward McKeown – For service to community of inner western Sydney.
- Rosemary Cochrane McLeod – For service to historical preservation, and to the community.
- Timothy Ross McLeod – For service to music through pipe bands.
- Michael Joseph McMahon – For service to sailing.
- Leo John McManus – For service to local government, and to the community of Nedlands.
- Cyril James McMaster – For service to Australian rules football in the Barwon South West Region.
- David Burnett McNeil – For service to business, and to professional associations.
- Leone Rhonda Meatchem – For service to jewellery design.
- Dominique Mecoy – For service to business, and to the community.
- Colin Francis Meng – For service to the community through a range of organisations.
- Dr Katarina Miljkovic – For service to science as a researcher.
- Frank William Miller – For service to the community through a range of organisations.
- Ronald Noel Miller – For service to the community of Gundaroo.
- Richard Mcrae Mills – For service to the community of the Armidale and Uralla regions.
- Nicola Minicozzi – For service to the Italian community of South Australia.
- Colin Douglas Mitchell – For service to the performing arts.
- The late Richard Charles Mitchell – For service to sport as an athlete and administrator.
- Janet (Jan) Mock – For service to the community of the Alpine Shire.
- Peter Moore – For service to cricket in New South Wales.
- John Charles Moran – For service to the communities of Mount Isa and Karumba.
- Ellena Margaret Morris – For service to swimming, and to people with disability.
- Peter Wayne Morris – For service to the community of the Illawarra.
- Yvonne Margaret Morrison – For service to equestrian sport.
- Noel Henry Moulder – For service to veterans.
- Catherine Mundy – For service to music as a performer, and to choral music.
- Kate Munro – For service to youth through social welfare organisations.
- Carmel Patricia Murdoch – For service to the community of Maryborough.
- The late Christopher Mark Murphy – For service to the performing arts through music.
- Brett Alan Murray – For service to children.
- Bruce Lindsay Murray – For service to secondary education, and to the community.
- The late Paul Simon Murray – For service to gymnastics as an administrator and coach.
- Peter Thornton Murray – For service to the community of Canberra.
- Carly-Anne Myers – For service to community health, and to people with disability.
- Kathleen Elizabeth Neehouse – For service to youth through Girl Guides.
- Professor Elizabeth Joy New – For service to science as a researcher.
- Dawn Newman – For service to the community through Zonta International, and to cricket.
- Andy Huu Nguyen – For service to veterans.
- John Patrick Nihill AFSM – For service to the community of Ouyen.
- Sarah Jane Nilsson – For service to nursing.
- James Allan Niven – For service to the building and construction industry.
- Cathryn Norma Nixon – For service to choral music, and to conservation and the environment.
- Dr Robert Alan North – For service to medicine, and to the community.
- Raymond James Norton – For service to the community of Adelaide.
- Dr Kristen Jean Nowak – For service to medical research.
- Maria (Marysia) Helena Nowak – For service to the Polish community of New South Wales.
- Noel Donald O'Brien – For service to the community through a range of roles.
- Elizabeth O'Callaghan – For service to education.
- Victor John O'Callaghan – For service to restorative practices.
- Dr Margaret Mary O'Donnell – For service to education, and to the community.
- Gregory Mark O'Mullane – For service to catholic education, and to school rugby union.
- Bernadette Margaret O'Neill – For service to rugby league, and to the community.
- Francis Joseph O'Neill – For service to the community through a range of organisations.
- Claire Louise O'Toole – For service to the building industry.
- Daniel Michael Oakes – For service to journalism.
- Marie Gay Oberlander – For service to the community through a range of charitable organisations.
- Nicole Oborne – For service to the financial sector, and to the community.
- Ruth Bronwyn Osborne – For service to the performing arts, particularly dance.
- The late John Wesley Owsnett – For service to the community through a range of roles.
- Barbara Joan Page-Hanify – For service to people with intellectual disability.
- Constantine Pagonis – For service to the multicultural community of Victoria.
- Evdokia Yvonne Panagacos – For service to the Greek community of Melbourne.
- Anthony Kwong Ming Pang – For service to the community through a range of roles.
- Morgan Benn Parker – For service to business.
- Raelene Helen Parker – For service to the Law.
- Wendy Parsons – For service to animal welfare.
- Christopher Allen Pash – For service to the media and communications sector.
- Rhian Patrick Patching – For service to people with disability, particularly through sport.
- Michael Clyde Patten – For service to the community through a range of organisations.
- The Reverend Barbara Ann Paull-Hunt – For service to the Anglican Church of Australia.
- Stuart Paxton – For service to the community through a range of roles.
- Janice Helen Peacock – For service to the museums and galleries sector.
- Milly Petriella – For service to the performing arts through administrative roles.
- Geoffrey Pickard – For service to the law, and to the aquaculture industry.
- Margaret Edith Pieroni – For service to botanical art.
- Edward Leonard Pitfield – For service to youth, and to the community.
- Paul Raymond Pollett – For service to the community through a range of roles.
- Barbara Josephine Power – For service to child welfare organisations.
- Councillor Carol Ann Provan – For service to local government, and to the community of the Sutherland Shire.
- Dr Stuart John Quarmby – For service to primary and secondary education.
- Diané Ranck – For service to the community through a range of organisations.
- Lynette Margaret Read – For service to community health.
- Allen Reed – For service to the community of Maroochydore.
- Suzanne Rees – For service to the community through a range of roles.
- Professor Michael David Reilly – For service to the community through a range of organisations.
- Peter Reynolds – For service to local government, and to the community.
- Susan Lynette Rice – For service to volleyball.
- Marion Joan Richardson – For service to the communities of Bendigo and Cohuna.
- Trevor Anthony Ricketts – For service to the community of Monbulk.
- Lilian Margaret Ries – For service to community health.
- Susan Maree Riley – For service to local government, and to the community of Melbourne.
- Warren Robert Riley – For service to swimming, and to surf life saving.
- Wilma Dawn Robarts – For service to the community of Williamstown.
- The late Dorothy Ann Robert – For service to community health.
- Allan Mcnaughton Robinson – For service to secondary education.
- Ian Scott Robinson – For service to the retail sector, and to professional associations.
- Dr Jeffrey Bruce Robinson – For service to medicine.
- Stephen Daniel Robinson – For service to the community through a range of organisations.
- The late David Patrick Robson – For service to aviation.
- Donald Kenneth Rogers – For service to school sport, and to education.
- Paul Edwin Rogers – For service to the community through a range of organisations.
- The late Lorraine Dale Rose – For service to community health as a psychologist.
- Dr Donald Graeme Ross – For service to science, and to lacrosse.
- Thelma (Tess) Marion Rowley – For service to community social welfare.
- Dr Arne Rubinstein – For service to youth.
- Timothy William Ryan BM – For service to surf lifesaving, and to the community.
- Elaine Ruth Sandow – For service to the community through a range of roles.
- Dr Toni Schofield – For service to community health, and to women.
- Adele Marie Schonhardt – For service to the arts.
- Craig Ernest Scott – For service to the community through a range of organisations.
- Olwyn Charis Scott – For service to the creative arts, particularly lacemaking.
- Catherine Ann Sedgwick – For service to the community through history preservation.
- Warwick Frank Shanks – For service to business, and to the community through a range of organisations.
- Margaret Ann Sheedy – For service to the community of the Shoalhaven region.
- Dr Adrian Cross Sheen – For service to medicine through a range of roles.
- Brian Robert Short – For service to secondary education.
- Professor Debbie Sue Silvester-Dean – For service to chemistry.
- Loretta Nancy Simmons – For service to the community through a range of roles.
- Kerry Margaret Skellern – For service to the community through a range of organisations.
- The late Dermot (Des) Arthur Skinner – For service to lawn bowls.
- Charles Francis Smith – For service to the arts as a sculptor.
- Susan Smith – For service to the visual arts as an artist and administrator.
- Michael Snell – For service to business, and to the community.
- Samuel William Southall – For service to the community through a range of roles.
- Dr Alan Lansell Soward – For service to cardiology.
- Colin Sidney Sparkes – For service to surf lifesaving, and to rugby league.
- Elizabeth Tracey Spicer – For service to the community through a range of roles.
- Dr David Arley Squirrell – For service to people with disability, and to the community.
- Dr David Stabler – For service to orthopaedic surgery.
- Adele Merilyn Staggs – For service to community health.
- Graham Phillip Staggs – For service to community health.
- Jane Stanley – For service to the community through social welfare organisations.
- Ellen Elizabeth Stanmore – For service to the community of Dubbo.
- David John Stanton – For service to the community of Illawarra.
- Nemira Aurelija Stapleton – For service to the Lithuanian community of Adelaide.
- Anthony (Shane) Stedman – For service to the surfing industry.
- Tony Steel – For service to Buddhism.
- Suzanne Denise Stothers – For service to the community of Central Gippsland.
- Mary Sutcliffe – For service to the community through music.
- Ann Sutton – For service to the community through a range of organisations.
- Nicholas Simon Swingler – For service to Australian rules football.
- Janet Faith Symons – For service to the community of Huon.
- John (Jack) Raymond Synnott – For service to the community of Cygnet.
- Mary Elizabeth Synnott – For service to the community of Cygnet.
- Caroline Talbot – For service to the community through a range of organisations.
- Pamella June Taylor – For service to nursing, and to the community.
- Rita Mary Taylor – For service to surf lifesaving.
- Michael Henry Tehan – For service to the community of the Goulburn Valley.
- Rose Temple – For service to the Jewish community.
- Dr Jan Maree Tennent – For service to research science, and to business.
- Roy Henry Teymant – For service to chess.
- Lavinia Joyce Tharle – For service to the community through a range of organisations.
- Lindsay Victor Tharle – For service to the community through a range of organisations.
- Malcolm Alwin Thiele – For service to veterans, and to the community.
- Anne-Catherine Thompson – For service to Modern Pentathlon.
- Ian Douglas Thomson – For service to the community through a range of organisations.
- Mary Patrice Tobin – For service to the performing arts through administrative roles.
- Benjamin Tory – For service to the community through emergency response organisations.
- Gerald Stanley Tucker – For service to swimming.
- The Honourable Charles Wilson Tuckey – For service to the people and Parliament of Australia.
- John Younie Tulloch – For service to oenology.
- Jay Turner – For service to music as a performer.
- Michael Geoffrey Turner – For service to the community of the Gold Coast region.
- Lorraine Elizabeth Tyler – For service to the community through a range of roles.
- Yvonne Jean Tyler – For service to community music.
- The Reverend Dr John Langton Tyman – For service to cultural and religious education.
- Suzanne Maree Urbaniak – For service to secondary education.
- Willem Van Keulen – For service to community music.
- Brenton Ivan Vanstone – For service to the community of Port Pirie.
- Corina Vucic – For service to business, and to the community.
- Catherine Verlie Walker – For service to education, and to the community.
- Helen Louise Walker – For service to women through a range of roles.
- Lee (Gidja) Isabel Walker – For service to conservation and the environment.
- Elaine Wallbridge – For service to the community through a range of roles and organisations.
- Joan Walsh-Smith – For service to the visual arts as a sculptor.
- Dr Margaret Louise Ward, PSM – For service to the building industry.
- Peter Charles Waterman – For service to the media as a journalist.
- Dr Christopher Lex Watson – For service to the community of Belconnen.
- Jon Richard Watts – For service to the community of Inverell.
- Cheryl Anne Waye – For service to softball, and to community health.
- Maxine Lola Webb – For service to the visual arts, and to the community of Wangaratta.
- Phillip Garth Weston – For service to the Anglican Church of Australia.
- The late Reverend Donald Graham Whebell – For service to the Uniting Church in Australia.
- Arthur Bruce Whitchell – For service to athletics in Victoria.
- Barbara Ann Whitcher – For service to the community through a range of organisations.
- Dr Amanda White – For service to tertiary education.
- Geoffrey Richard White – For service to youth through Boys Brigade.
- Kathleen Edith Whiteley – For service to community sports administration.
- Peta Whitford – For service to orienteering, and to the community of Steels Creek.
- Andrew Sidney Whitton – For service to the community through a range of roles.
- Ralph Clayton Wiese – For service to secondary education, and to cricket.
- Lucia Wilcox – For service to netball.
- David Allan Williams – For service to veterans, and to the community.
- Nuala Margaret Williams – For service to youth through choral music.
- Carol Joyce Willis – For service to the community through a range of roles.
- William David Willis – For service to the community of Newcastle.
- Bruce James Wilson – For service to the community, and to agricultural education.
- Associate Professor Hannah Catherine Wilson (Moore) – For service to epidemiology as a researcher.
- Richard Albert Winch – For service to the community through a range of organisations.
- Janet Maree Withers – For service to youth through guiding.
- Jennifer Woodward – For service to the broadcast media, particularly to television.
- Elizabeth Karen Wynne – For service to the community of Yarram.
- Zeynep Yesilyurt – For service to multicultural communities, and to women's affairs.
- Dr Matthew Thomas Young – For service to community health.

==== Military Division ====
Navy

- Commander Steven John Bliss, RAN – For meritorious service in the fields of joint and combined exercise design and evaluations.
- Captain Jacqueline Margaret King, RAN – For meritorious service to the Australian Defence Force in seaworthiness, explosive ordnance safety and policy.
- Warrant Officer David John Passmore – For meritorious service to the Australian Defence Force in diving safety, governance and policy.
- Chief Petty Officer Steven David Paterson, CSM – For meritorious service in the fields of Navy Engineering and Training.
- Commander Liza Jane Stephenson, RAN – For performance of duty in the delivery of operational intelligence to Defence.

Army

- Major David Graeme Brown, CSM – For meritorious service in the delivery of strategic human resource capability for the Australian Army.
- Warrant Officer Class One Glen Andrew Donalson – For meritorious service as the Afghan National Army Sergeant Major Academy Senior Soldier Advisor, Career Advisor Royal Australian Engineers and the Regimental Sergeant Major of the 5th Brigade and Joint Task Group 629.1.
- Warrant Officer Class Two Tommy Munyarryun – For meritorious service in cross cultural leadership within the Regional Force Surveillance Group.

Air Force

- Sergeant Justin Luke Kurban – For meritorious service in delivery of maintenance outcomes for C-27J Spartan and C-130J-30 Super Hercules tactical airlift capability for the Australian Defence Force.
- Flight Sergeant Grant William Reibel – For meritorious service in design and development of Military Working Dog training, operational policy and for driving best practice operational models.

==== Honorary ====
- Paul Grimshaw – For service to conservation and the environment.
- William Humble – For service to the community of Stanthorpe.
- Denise Hylands – For service to community radio.
- Judith Jane Perrin – For service to gymnastics, and to the community.
- John Ward – For service to gnomonics.

== Meritorius Service ==
=== Public Service Medal (PSM) ===
Public Service Medal ribbon

Commonwealth

- Elizabeth Jane Baxter – For outstanding public service to organisational capability and culture at Australian Skills Quality Authority.
- Nicholas Patrick Carbines – For outstanding public service in the provision of payments and supporting those most vulnerable and experiencing homelessness across inner city Melbourne.
- Dr John Harold Dawson – For outstanding public service to government, industry and the community to improve social, environmental and economic outcomes for Australia.
- Nicholas John Housego – For outstanding public service in developing and embedding the practice of facilitation services within government departments and agencies.
- Dr Andrew Kenneth Johnson – For outstanding public service through leadership in developing and stewarding Australia’s capability in the environmental and physical sciences.
- Amanda Lee – For outstanding public service in leadership and professionalism in the development and delivery of the Commonwealth budgets and fiscal policy.
- David Pringle – For outstanding public service to the Federal Circuit and Family Court of Australia through innovative leadership and vision.
- Chantelle Stratford – For outstanding public service in leadership and innovation in gender equality and women’s policy within the Australian Government.
- Gemma Van Halderen – For outstanding public service in delivering significant statistical developments for better use of data for public policy purposes, both in Australia and internationally.
- Sally-Anne Vincent – For outstanding public service in contributing to the safety of Australians, security of missions and protection of bilateral relationships through difficult environments and overseas crises.

Australian Capital Territory

- Kareena Arthy – For outstanding public service to economic development and recovery during the COVID-19 pandemic.
- Fiona Barbaro – For outstanding public service to the ACT Government's COVID-19 vaccination program.
- Natalie Jayne Cooper – For outstanding public service in communications for the ACT Government's COVID-19 vaccination program.
- Rodney Dix – For outstanding public service to environmental protection services across the ACT.
- Karen Elizabeth Doran – For outstanding public service to community safety through leadership, policy advice and program administration.
- Emma May Gowling – For outstanding public service to the Office of the COVID-19 Local Business Commissioner for the ACT.
- Michael Hatswell – For outstanding public service to public education as the principal of Evatt Primary School.
- Jonathan Kobus – For outstanding public service to the Canberra and region tourism industry through the COVID-19 pandemic.
- Victor Hugo Martin – For outstanding public service in managing the COVID-19 Proactive Compliance Inspection Program for the ACT's COVID-19 response.
- Jenny Anne Priest – For outstanding public service in leading the delivery of Business Support Grants to businesses in the ACT impacted by COVID-19.
- Charmaine Smith – For outstanding public service to the ACT Government's COVID-19 vaccination program.
- Susan Ruth Vroombout – For outstanding public service as the Deputy Under Treasurer in the ACT Treasury during COVID-19.
- Joanne Margaret Wood – For outstanding public service in supporting vulnerable Canberrans throughout the ACT's COVID-19 response.

New South Wales

- Muhammad Humair Ahmad – For outstanding public service to social and affordable housing reforms across public and community housing.
- Patricia Monica Barone – For outstanding public service to the local government sector and Resilient Sydney.
- Wendy Bleney (Hoey) – For outstanding public service and dedication to the delivery of health care to vulnerable populations in correctional and secure settings.
- Rosemary Anne Burke – For outstanding public service in the implementation and running of the COVID-19 vaccination program and Special Health Accommodation pharmacy support for the NSW Department of Health.
- Tammy Childs – For outstanding public service through community leadership during the 2022 NSW Northern Rivers floods.
- Jacqueline Marie Cross – For outstanding public service to nursing and midwifery.
- Glenn James Downie – For outstanding public service to the community and students, in particular, the delivery of COVID-19 related services.
- Diane Elfleet – For outstanding public service to healthcare, in particular, the delivery of COVID-19 related services.
- Lisa Michelle Freeman – For outstanding public service to the NSW District Court, particularly across the COVID-19 pandemic response.
- Simon Bernard Geraghty – For outstanding public service in the development of technology platforms providing vital services and access to government services.
- Dillon Kombumerri – For outstanding public service to the field of architecture and design and relationships with Aboriginal and Torres Strait Islander cultures and cultural practices.
- Wenche Margrethe Kverneland – For outstanding public service to healthcare, in particular, the delivery of COVID-19 related services.
- Graeme Andrew Loy – For outstanding public service to healthcare, in particular, the delivery of COVID-19 related services.
- Nicholas Magriplis – For outstanding public service to public education, in particular, the delivery of COVID-19 related services.
- Rachael Marlow – For outstanding public service to healthcare, in particular, the delivery of COVID-19 related services.
- Suzie Matthews – For outstanding public service to the community and students, in particular, the delivery of COVID-19 related services.
- Lorna McNamara – For outstanding public service to members of the NSW community who experience disadvantage, inequality and injustice.
- Christopher John Sullivan – For outstanding public service through leadership in establishing and delivering critical protocols.
- Emma Tan – For outstanding public service to healthcare, in particular, the delivery of COVID-19 related services.
- Elizabeth Karen Vandy – For outstanding public service to NSW, particularly through data analytics and workforce reporting.
- Nicholas Andrew Weller – For outstanding public service to the NSW Police Force, in particular, the delivery of COVID-19 work, health and safety policies.

Northern Territory

- Luccio Franco Cercarelli – For outstanding public service to the Northern Territory Local Government.
- Christopher John Cox – For outstanding public service to the Northern Territory public sector.

Queensland

- Dr Peter John Aitken – For outstanding public service during COVID-19 to Queensland's emergency health response and to the field of disaster management.
- Mary Narrida Campbell – For outstanding public service to vocational education and training in Queensland.
- Associate Professor David William Cartwright – For outstanding public service to Queensland in the field of neonatal medicine.
- Darren Cleland – For outstanding public service to regional and rural communities in Queensland.
- Dr Allison Crook – For outstanding public service during COVID-19 to animal welfare and the protection of biosecurity in Queensland.
- Tracey Leanne Graham – For outstanding public service to the community of Pormpuraaw.
- David Llewellyn Meredith – For outstanding public service to public prosecutions in Queensland.
- Dennis John Walsh – For outstanding public service to transport and road safety in Queensland.

South Australia

- Rebecca Anne Bates – For outstanding public service to the people of South Australia during the COVID-19 pandemic response.
- David Martin Brown – For outstanding public service in correctional services and public administration.
- Professor Robert Alwyn Fitridge – For outstanding public service in the provision of vascular surgery and high-quality care for patients in public hospitals.
- Sally Janet Smith – For outstanding public service in urban and regional planning across South Australia.

Tasmania

- Patricia (Rae) Burrows – For outstanding public service through the management of Tasmania's biosecurity policies and programs in response to the COVID-19 pandemic.
- Simon Andrew Hiscock – For outstanding public service in emergency management and recovery throughout various community disasters and the COVID-19 pandemic.
- Sophie Jane Muller – For outstanding public service and leadership in Tasmania's COVID-19 pandemic response through the instrumental development of essential policies and documents.
- Elizabeth Ann Owen – For outstanding public service to the LGBTIQA+ community through the facilitation and integration of legislative reforms.
- Laura Pyszkowski – For outstanding public service through exceptional leadership and innovation to acute care and the community during the COVID-19 pandemic.

Victoria

- Bree Bolst – For outstanding public service and leadership in response to COVID-19.
- Rex Bewick Candy – For outstanding public service in waterway management.
- Dr Emma Cassar – For outstanding public service and leadership in Victoria's response to the COVID-19 pandemic.
- Jennifer Margaret Green – For outstanding public service in public administration to successive Secretaries of the Victorian Department of Premier and Cabinet.
- Christine Howlett – For outstanding public service in preventing social harm and exceptional contribution to public sector integrity.
- Heather Joan Macalister – For outstanding public service to public education.
- Trudie Maree Nagle – For outstanding public service to public education.
- Catherine Anne Quinn – For outstanding public service to forensic science and reform in the scientific field in support of community safety.
- Kelly Marie Stanton – For outstanding public service in the area of family violence and pioneering world-leading reforms to improve the lives of victim survivors.
- Kassem Younes – For outstanding public service, particularly in the areas of foreign investment and trade.

Western Australia

- Dr Revle Diane Bangor-Jones – For outstanding public service through strategic leadership of the public health response to COVID-19, including the management of COVID-19 outbreaks on vessels in Western Australian waters.
- Iain Findlater Cameron – For outstanding public service through leadership in road safety in Western Australia.
- Fiona Maree Fischer – For outstanding public service through innovation in the delivery of human services in the Kimberley Region of Western Australia.
- Dr Robyn Ann Lawrence – For outstanding public service through substantial contributions to Western Australia's response to COVID-19.

=== Australian Police Medal (APM) ===
Australian Police Medal ribbon

Australian Federal Police

- Detective Inspector Peter Charles Dean
- Detective Leading Senior Constable Katherine Laidler
- Commander Melinda Jane Phelan

New South Wales Police Force

- Superintendent Gina Kathrin Bostick
- Detective Superintendent Despa Fitzgerald
- Detective Chief Inspector Neil Robert Grey
- Chief Superintendent Toby Christopher Lindsay
- Chief Inspector Gregory David Mahon
- Superintendent Michael John Rochester
- Superintendent Joanne Schultz
- Chief Inspector Raymond Peter Stynes
- Superintendent Sonya Tabor
- Detective Chief Superintendent Jason Weinstein

Northern Territory Police

- Sergeant Isobel Anne Cummins
- Commander Hege Ronning-Burns

Queensland Police Service

- Inspector Lynne Angela Asher
- Chief Superintendent John Mario Bosnjak
- Sergeant Patricia Ann Brennan
- Superintendent Peter David Brewer
- Detective Senior Sergeant Paul Leonard Fletcher
- Chief Superintendent Chris Andrew Hodgman
- Superintendent Shane Michael Holmes
- Inspector Brett Page Jackson
- Detective Chief Superintendent Roger Alexander Lowe
- Detective Superintendent Andrew Peter Massingham
- Sergeant Lesley Marlane Walker
- Senior Sergeant Stephen Wyatt

South Australia Police

- Chief Superintendent Yvette June Clark
- Detective Chief Inspector Brett Martyn Featherby
- Senior Sergeant First Class Darren Craig McCue

Tasmania Police

- Commander Kate Elizabeth Chambers
- Mr Jason John Elmer

Victoria Police

- Inspector Andrew John Glow
- Superintendent David Matthew Griffin
- Detective Senior Sergeant Barry Grant Jenks
- Inspector Wayne Grant Martin
- Detective Senior Sergeant Andrew William McGowan
- Detective Sergeant Roslyn Valerie Wilson

Western Australia Police Force

- Detective Sergeant Andrew Roy Coen
- Inspector Robyn Clare Greene
- Superintendent Jonathan Norman Kazandzis
- Commander John Michael Leembruggen

=== Australian Fire Service Medal (AFSM) ===
Australian Fire Service Medal ribbon

New South Wales

- Roberta Colbran
- Keith Thomas Driver
- Sally Jane Foote
- Michael John Gilder
- Paul William Jones
- Assistant Commissioner David John Lewis
- Jamie Grant Loader
- John Columba McGarvey
- Barry William Myers
- George Alfred Nicholson
- John Thomas Page
- Barry Lawrence Richard

Victoria

- Kathryn Gosby
- Stephen Roy Grant
- Paula Louise Grosveld
- William Gordon Johnstone
- John Katakouzinos
- Costa Katsikis
- Damian Paul O'Toole
- Ross Michael Sullivan

Queensland

- Simon Nicholas Ball
- David John Heck
- Paul Mardon
- Assistant Commissioner Gary David McCormack
- Colin Ross Santacaterina

Western Australia

- Craig Brendan Garrett
- Christopher Lindsay Scott
- Craig James Stewart
- Ronald Leslie Winstone

South Australia

- Robert Andrew Cadd
- Dylan Nathan Faber
- Peter John Reynolds

Tasmania

- Evan George Cram
- Lyndon Ian Gabites
- David John Hean

Australian Capital Territory

- Gerald Peter Muhldorff

Northern Territory

- Stephen Ronald Sewell

=== Ambulance Service Medal (ASM) ===
Ambulance Service Medal ribbon

New South Wales

- Jacqueline Kay Armstrong
- Martin Nichols
- Acting Assistant Commissioner Brian Michael White

Victoria

- Lindsay Norman Bent
- Barry Clifford Curtain
- Lindsay Kirstyn Mackay
- Ian Walsh
- Alan Wilkins

Queensland

- Kevin John Homer
- Erin Maree Saltmarsh

Western Australia

- John Backo
- Paul James Beech
- Melissa Anne Gardiner
- Dane Shaw Hendry

South Australia

- Andrew Paul Albury
- Kathleen Ruth Hutchinson
- Peter Michael McEntee

Tasmania

- Suzanne Brigette Smith

Northern Territory

- Kylie Marie Killalea

=== Emergency Services Medal (ESM) ===
Emergency Services Medal ribbon

Federal

- Susan Sheldrick

New South Wales

- Rodney James Coombes
- John Andrew Gonzalez
- Geoffrey Thomas Hanson
- Andrew Maxwell McKellar
- Brian William Wilcox

Victoria

- Graeme Charles Hurrell
- Stanislaw (Stanley) Jezewski

Queensland

- Mark Edward Dole
- Brian John Higgins
- Peta Lawlor
- Andrew Paul McNeilly
- Colin Denis Neil, OAM
- Susan Maree Neil, OAM

South Australia

- Christopher James Beattie
- Andrea Kay Geytenbeek

Tasmania

- Raymond Keith Cooper
- Brian Ray James
- Frances Ann Manning

Australian Capital Territory

- Tristan Wesley Peemoeller

=== Australian Corrections Medal (ACM) ===
Australian Corrections Medal ribbon

New South Wales

- Alissa Beddy
- Donna Marie Brotherton
- Sheryn Carroll
- Samantha Nanita Efu
- Cathryn Gibson
- Janine Wendy Powell
- Rebecca Anne Rowan
- Patrick Joseph Towns
- Samantha Rose Wager

Victoria

- Miranda Ellul
- Wayne Maxwell Jackson
- Mark Kenneth Jones
- Philip David Sellman

Queensland

- Renee Natalie Rieson
- Geoffrey Phillip Robins
- Stephen Glen Wright

Western Australia

- Lisa Maree Cross
- Sandra Patten
- Michael John Reynolds

South Australia

- Jennifer Margaret Colley
- Dr Yilma Woldgabreal

Tasmania

- Matthew David Shadwick

Australian Capital Territory

- Dean Matthew Smith

=== Australian Intelligence Medal (AIM) ===
Australian Intelligence Medal ribbon

- Cameron Ashe
- Jenny Gianakis
- Wayne H
- Dominique Labutte
- Claudio S
- Reyner W

== Distinguished and Conspicuous Service ==
=== Distinguished Service Medal (DSM) ===
Distinguished Service Medal ribbon

Army

- Lieutenant Colonel M – For distinguished leadership in warlike operations as a Task Force Commander on Operation AUGURY from April to November 2022.

=== Conspicuous Service Cross (CSC) ===
Conspicuous Service Cross ribbon

Navy

- Chief Petty Officer Gillian Louise Bryant – For outstanding achievement as a member of the Royal Australian Navy Sea Training Group Defence Cooperation Program.
- Commander Claire Elizabeth Jones, RAN – For outstanding achievement in armaments engineering management and acquisition for the Australian Defence Force.
- Commander Nathan Wyllie Lockhart, RAN – For outstanding achievement in the field of Navy Communications and Information Warfare.
- Commodore Gustaaf Henri Nord-Thomson, RAN – For outstanding devotion to duty as a senior leader within Australia’s Collins-class submarine program.

Army

- Brigadier Mark Norman Armstrong – For outstanding achievement as Commander Joint Task Group 629.3 on Operation FLOOD ASSIST 2022 from April 2022 to December 2022.
- Lieutenant Colonel Alana Burkitt – For outstanding achievement as an Australian Defence Force Officer while seconded to the Office of National Intelligence’s Joint Analysis Team.
- Lieutenant Colonel Gwenda Margo Caspersonn – For outstanding devotion to duty as the Army Coordination Officer to the Royal Commission into Defence and Veteran Suicide.
- Colonel John Angus Dougall – For outstanding achievement as the Director Business Intelligence, Army Headquarters.
- Lieutenant Colonel David James Evans – For outstanding devotion to duty on Operation MAZURKA as the Commander Australian Contingent and Force Operations Team Commander in the Multinational Force and Observers Headquarters, South Camp, Sharm el- Sheikh, Egypt from October 2021 to October 2022.
- Brigadier G – For outstanding achievement in operational command of special and sensitive operations from 18 May 2020 to 5 November 2022.
- Colonel Michael James King – For outstanding devotion to duty as the Commanding Officer of 7th Combat Signal Regiment.
- Brigadier Robert Barton Lording, CSM – For outstanding achievement as Commander Joint Task Group 629.1 on Operation FLOOD ASSIST 2022 from February to October 2022.
- Colonel Rodney Waldemar Petersen – For outstanding devotion to duty as Staff Officer Class One, Military Employment Classification and Review Service, Joint Health Command.
- Lieutenant Colonel Jonathan David Pollard – For outstanding achievement as Staff Officer Grade One 12th Chief Engineer Works Capability Implementation Team and Commanding Officer 12th Chief Engineer Works.
- Lieutenant Colonel Benjamin Lytton Watson – For outstanding achievement as an Operational Planner for the Indo-Pacific Integrated Operations Team and lead planner in Headquarters Joint Operations Command for developing an Australian Defence Force operational contingency plan.

Air Force

- Warrant Officer Paul Ernest Argus – For outstanding achievement in aircraft maintenance reform and technical workforce career management in the Royal Australian Air Force.
- Wing Commander David Norman Bell – For outstanding achievement in introducing the F-35A Lightning II into operational service for the Australian Defence Force.
- Wing Commander Brett Andrew Clarke – For outstanding achievement in international engagement in the multi-national Five Power Defence Arrangements forum through development and advancement of Communications Information Systems.
- Group Captain Daniel Christopher Drinan – For outstanding achievement as the Director Select Strategic Issues Management in Australian Defence Force Headquarters, managing the Defence response to enterprise-wide serious and sensitive issues.
- Wing Commander Andrew Michael Jackson, OAM – For outstanding achievement during the introduction into service of the F-35A Lightning II.
- Squadron Leader Malith Jayasinghe – For outstanding achievement in Cyber Security and Information and Communications Technology Management for the Royal Australian Air Force.
- Warrant Officer Martin James Miller – For outstanding achievement in the training, development and technical leadership of the maintenance workforce for the Royal Australian Air Force Maritime Patrol capability.
- Air Commodore Scott Matthew Parry, AM – For outstanding achievement in strategic air mobility sustainment as the Officer Commanding Heavy Air Lift Systems Program Office.
- Warrant Officer Melinda Jane Skinner – For outstanding achievement in movements coordination for the Australian Defence Force as a Movements Warrant Officer in the Royal Australian Air Force.

=== Conspicuous Service Medal (CSM) ===
Conspicuous Service Medal ribbon

Navy

- Lieutenant Commander Simon Craig Abley, RAN – For meritorious achievement as the Commanding Officer of the Maritime Deployable Robotic and Autonomous Systems Experimentation Unit.
- Chief Petty Officer Dennis Andrew Anning – For meritorious achievement in engineering and technical mastery within the Mine Warfare and Clearance Diving Group.
- Warrant Officer Jessica Amy Buley – For devotion to duty as Communications and Information Warfare Manager in HMAS Sydney.
- Lieutenant Commander Michael Copland, RAN – For devotion to duty in developing and delivering intelligence to the Headquarters United States Indo-Pacific Command and the Intelligence Enterprise of Australia, United Kingdom, Canada, New Zealand and the United States of America.
- Captain Roger Fonhof, RAN – For devotion to duty to the Royal Australian Navy in the field of workforce development and personnel management.
- Lieutenant Commander Mark Gallagher, RAN – For devotion to duty as the Executive Officer HMAS Penguin.
- Petty Officer Keigan James Gunther – For meritorious achievement as the Senior Systems Maintainer in HMAS Rankin.
- Warrant Officer Steven Alexander McConnachie – For devotion to duty as the Warrant Officer Electronics Technician – Weapons in Fleet Command.
- Lieutenant Matthew Alex Parritt, RAN – For meritorious achievement in the field of engineering within the Australian Destroyer Group.
- Commander Peter Dennis Shirley, RAN – For meritorious achievement in the field of Navy combat system engineering.
- Warrant Officer Cheryl Valerie Young – For meritorious achievement as the Maritime Personnel Manager in HMAS Canberra.

Army

- Captain Jackson Harris Cail – For meritorious achievement as the Construction Officer and Infrastructure Program Manager, Defence Cooperation Program, Papua New Guinea.
- Warrant Officer Class One Damien Mark Chueng – For meritorious achievement as Career Manager Electronic Warfare Operator.
- Warrant Officer Class One Steven Owen Davies – For devotion to duty to the Australian Defence Force in supporting Joint Military Police operations in the most complex and demanding circumstances.
- Bombardier Adam James Davies-Moore – For meritorious achievement in advancing Army’s counter- unmanned aerial system capability.
- Warrant Officer Class One Nigel Roy Dobson – For meritorious achievement in the field of signals planning, and the development and implementation of survivable telecommunication networks.
- Warrant Officer Class Two David Robert Elliott – For meritorious achievement while posted as the Uncrewed Aircraft Systems subject matter expert within the 2nd Commando Regiment, and the 9th Regiment, Royal Australian Artillery from January 2019 to October 2022.
- Captain Nicholas Paul Goldsworthy – For meritorious achievement in explosive ordnance operational training at the Defence Explosive Ordnance Training School for the Australian Defence Force.
- Warrant Officer Class One Shawn Glenn Goodbody – For devotion to duty to Army's transitioning veterans as Member Support Coordinator within the Army Personnel Support Unit.
- Signaller Thomas Anthony Grayham – For meritorious achievement as the Information Systems Technician for capability development on Joint Task force 629 on Operation COVID-19 ASSIST from July to November 2021 and Operation FLOOD ASSIST 2022 from April to November 2022.
- Warrant Officer Class One Megan Jennifer Griffiths – For devotion to duty as the Chief Clerk, Defence Signals Intelligence and Cyber Command.
- Colonel Alison Kim Kaine – For meritorious achievement in the field of sensitive and strategic personnel case management in the Australian Army.
- Warrant Officer Class Two Benjamin James Kilgour – For meritorious achievement as the Senior Enlisted Advisor and Operations Warrant Officer deployed to Headquarters Middle East on Operation ACCORDION from July 2022 to January 2023.
- Major Benjamin Kreis – For meritorious achievement as the career manager within the Senior Warrant Officer portfolio for the Australian Regular Army.
- Major L – For meritorious achievement as the Legal Officer in support of a Special Operations Task Force deployed on Operation AUGURY - GLOBAL, April 2022 to November 2022.
- Lieutenant Colonel James Thomas Pidgeon – For meritorious achievement as the Formation Operations Officer and Chief of Staff within the 16th Aviation Brigade.
- Lieutenant Colonel Meng Wang – For meritorious achievement as the Staff Officer Grade One Rotary Wing Development, Headquarters Aviation Command.
- Warrant Officer Class One Sean Heinz Weber – For devotion to duty as the Regimental Artificer Sergeant Major of the 2nd Cavalry Regiment.
- Major Sally Williamson – For meritorious achievement as the Staff Officer Grade Two Training Transformation, Headquarters Army Logistic Training Centre.

Air Force

- Chaplain (Wing Commander) Lindsay Brian Carey – For devotion to duty in Moral Injury research and the development of resources and training to support Australian Defence Force personnel.
- Wing Commander Denis Brian French – For meritorious achievement as an Operational Planner for the Indo-Pacific Integrated Operations Team, Headquarters Joint Operations Command.
- Corporal Matthew Palmer – For meritorious achievement as an Air Intelligence Analyst – Signals at Number 87 Squadron in developing and implementing world leading signals intelligence support to Number 81 Wing, significantly improving survivability and lethality of F-35A in an enduring capability.
- Corporal Jack Clifford Simpson – For meritorious achievement in C-17A Globemaster workforce training, development and maintenance management for the Royal Australian Air Force.
- Squadron Leader Melissa Jane Vreugdenburg – For meritorious achievement in the development and progression of collaborative Space Control capabilities for the Australian Defence Force.
