= Nadine Caron =

Canadian surgeon

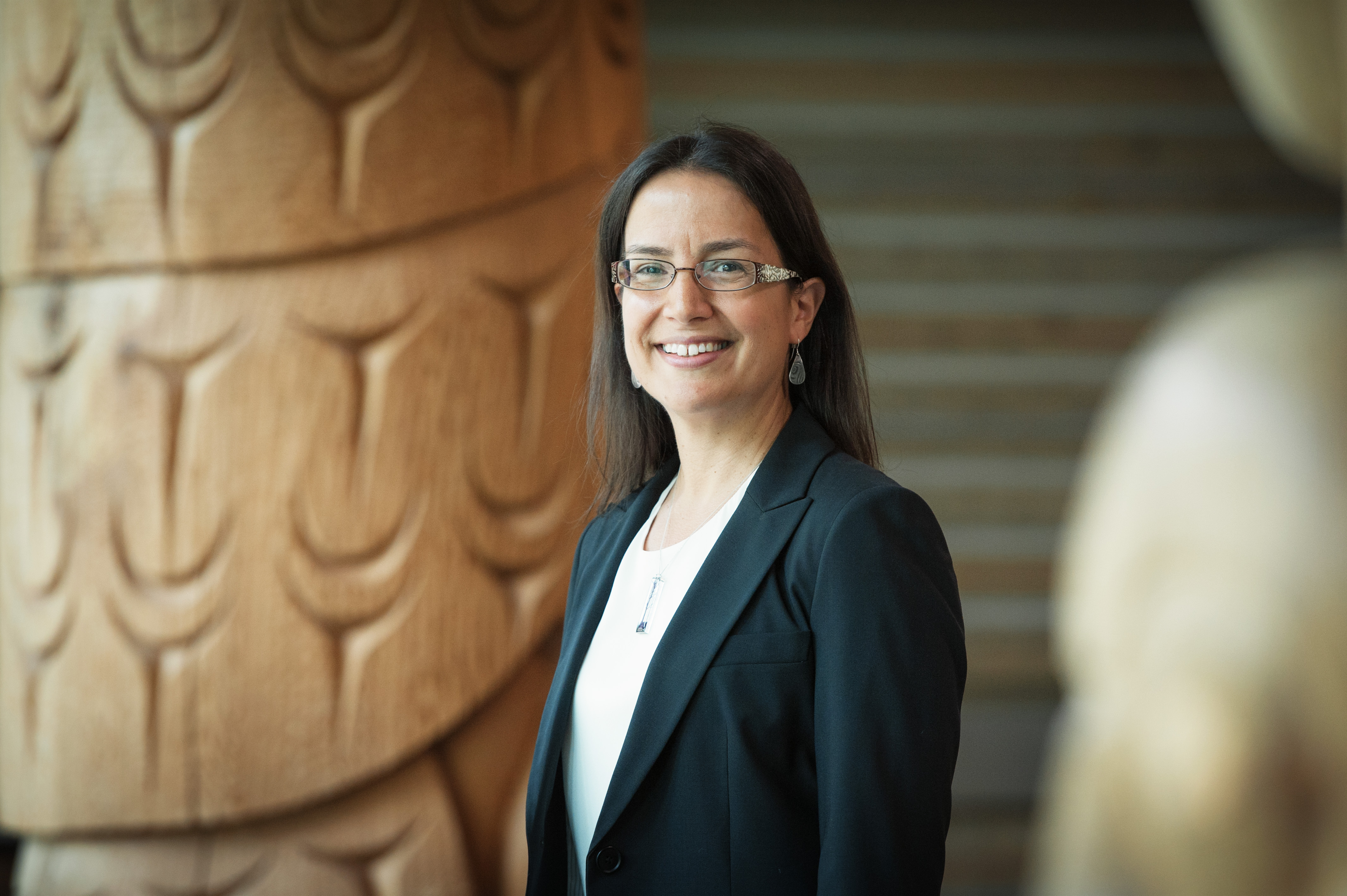
- Nadine Caron in 2015
- Born: 1970 (age 55–56); Kamloops, British Columbia
- Education: Simon Fraser University; University of British Columbia; Harvard University
- Scientific career
- Workplaces: Prince George Regional Hospital; UBC Faculty of Medicine; Johns Hopkins Bloomberg School of Public Health

Nadine Rena Caron FACS, FRCSC, (born 1970), is a Canadian surgeon. She is the first Canadian female general surgeon of First Nations descent (Ojibway), as well as the first female First Nations student to graduate from University of British Columbia's medical school.

== Early life and education ==
Caron was born in Kamloops, British Columbia, to an Ojibwe mother and an Italian immigrant father. Her mother was a teacher and her father was a mason. She is an Anishnawbe from Sagamok Anishnawbek First Nation.

After growing up in Kamloops, she completed her BSc in Kinesiology at Simon Fraser University in 1993, where she was also a star basketball player and the winner of numerous awards, including the Shrum Gold Medal, awarded to the top undergraduate student. While completing her MD at the UBC Faculty of Medicine, Caron was again recognized as being the top ranked student. Caron also completed an MA in Public Health from Harvard University, while completing her surgical residency, as well as a postgraduate fellowship at the University of California, San Francisco, focused on endocrine surgical oncology. In June 2017, she received an honorary Doctorate of Laws from the University of the Fraser Valley. In October 2019, she received an honorary degree from Simon Fraser University.

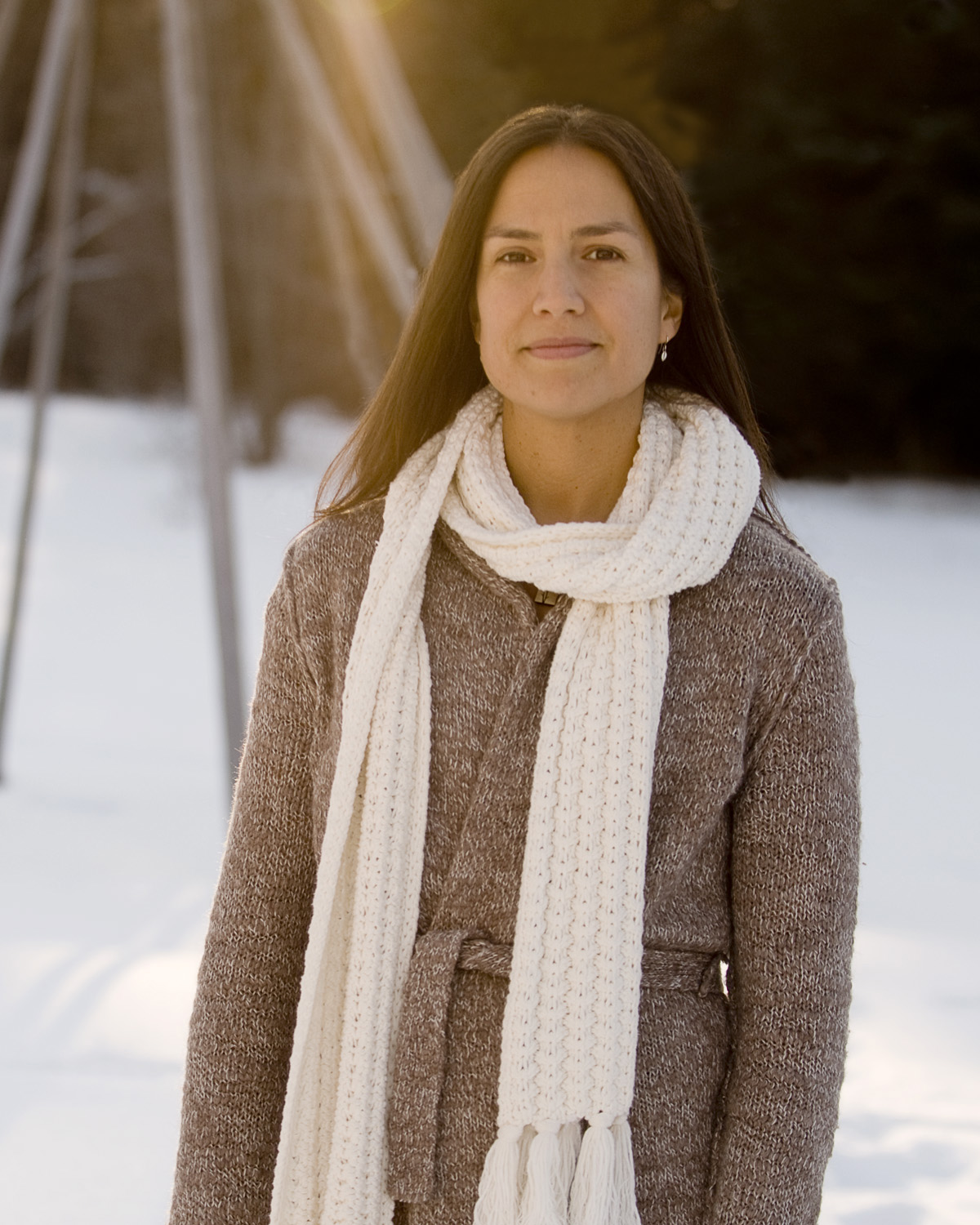
Nadine Caron in 2010

== Career ==
Caron works as a general and endocrine surgeon at Prince George Regional Hospital. She is an associate professor in the Department of Surgery, UBC Faculty of Medicine, and was appointed co-director of UBC's Centre for Excellence in Indigenous Health in 2014. She received the 2016 Thomas Dignan Indigenous Health Award from the Royal College of Physicians and Surgeons of Canada. In 2023, she won the James IV Association of Surgeons Canadian Travelling Fellowship. Caron was rewarded for public health studies concerning Rural and First Nations populations. Caron leads the Northern Biobank Project, which will improve patients' access to participate in personalized medicine research in northern British Columbia. Caron currently works as an associate faculty member at Johns Hopkins Bloomberg School of Public Health.

Caron has served on several committees, including the Native Physicians Association of Canada, the British Columbia's Medical Association's Committee on Health Promotion, and the Ministry of Health's Advisory Committee on Provincial Health Goals.

Caron was appointed the inaugural First Nations Health Authority (FNHA) Chair in Cancer and Wellness at the University of British Columbia in 2020. She helped found UBC's Centre for Excellence in Indigenous Health with Martin Schechter.

She is an adjunct professor at the University of Northern British Columbia, associate faculty at the University of British Columbia's School of Population and Public Health, and a BC Cancer Agency scientist at the Genome Sciences Centre.

== Select publications ==
- Caron, Nadine; Pasieka, Janice (2009). "What Symptom Improvement Can Be Expected After Operation for Primary Hyperparathyroidism?". World Journal of Surgery. 33 (11): 2244–2255. doi:10.1007/s00268-009-9987-4. ISSN 0364-2313. PMID 19288279. S2CID 22857624.
- Caron, Nadine; Clark, Orlo (2006). "Papillary thyroid cancer". Current Treatment Options in Oncology. 7 (4): 309–319. doi:10.1007/s11864-006-0040-7. ISSN 1527-2729. PMID 16916491. S2CID 19369109.
- Caron, Nadine R.; Clark, Orlo H. (August 2006). "Papillary thyroid cancer". Current Treatment Options in Oncology. 7 (4): 309–319. doi:10.1007/s11864-006-0040-7. PMID 16916491. S2CID 19369109.
- Caron, Nadine R.; Sturgeon, Cord; Clark, Orlo H. (August 2004). "Persistent and recurrent hyperparathyroidism". Current Treatment Options in Oncology. 5 (4): 335–345. doi:10.1007/s11864-004-0024-4. PMID 15233910. S2CID 45386082.
- Tan, Yah Yuen; Ogilvie, Jennifer B.; Triponez, Frederick; Caron, Nadine R.; Kebebew, Electron K.; Clark, Orlo H.; Duh, Quan-Yang (May 2006). "Selective Use of Adrenal Venous Sampling in the Lateralization of Aldosterone-producing Adenomas". World Journal of Surgery. 30 (5): 879–885. doi:10.1007/s00268-005-0622-8. PMID 16680603. S2CID 24728458.
- Triponez, Frederic; Wong, Mariwil; Sturgeon, Cord; Caron, Nadine; Ginzinger, David G.; Segal, Mark R.; Kebebew, Electron; Duh, Quan-Yang; Clark, Orlo H. (May 2006). "Does Familial Non-Medullary Thyroid Cancer Adversely Affect Survival?". World Journal of Surgery. 30 (5): 787–793. doi:10.1007/s00268-005-0398-x. PMID 16479341. S2CID 10442757.
- Scudamore, Charles H.; Erb, Siegfried R.; Morris, Chris; Hemming, Alan; Poostizadeh, Ahmad; Buczkowski, Andrzej K.; Caron, Nadine (May 1996). "Medium aperture meso-caval shunts reliably prevent recurrent variceal hemorrhages". The American Journal of Surgery. 171 (5): 490–494. doi:10.1016/S0002-9610(97)89610-9. ISSN 0002-9610. PMID 8651392.
- Sippel, Rebecca S.; Caron, Nadine R.; Clark, Orlo H. (May 2007). "An Evidence-based Approach to Familial Nonmedullary Thyroid Cancer: Screening, Clinical Management, and Follow-up". World Journal of Surgery. 31 (5): 924–933. doi:10.1007/s00268-006-0847-1. PMID 17429563. S2CID 25334126.
- Clarkson, Adam F.; Christian, Wayne M.; Pearce, Margo E.; Jongbloed, Kate A.; Caron, Nadine R.; Teegee, Mary P.; Moniruzzaman, Akm; Schechter, Martin T.; Spittal, Patricia M. (2015). "The Cedar Project: Negative health outcomes associated with involvement in the child welfare system among young Indigenous people who use injection and non-injection drugs in two Canadian cities". Canadian Journal of Public Health. 106 (5): e265–e270. doi:10.17269/cjph.106.5026. ISSN 0008-4263. PMC 6972141. PMID 26451986.
- Olson, R. A.; Nichol, A.; Caron, N. R.; Olivotto, I. A.; Speers, C.; Chia, S.; Davidson, A.; Coldman, A.; Bajdik, C.; Tyldesley, S. (2012). "Effect of Community Population Size on Breast Cancer Screening, Stage Distribution, Treatment Use and Outcomes". Canadian Journal of Public Health. 103 (1): 46–52. doi:10.1007/BF03404068. JSTOR 41995705. PMC 6973821. PMID 22338328.
- Martin, Danielle; Miller, Ashley P.; Quesnel-Vallée, Amélie; Caron, Nadine R; Vissandjée, Bilkis; Marchildon, Gregory P. (April 2018). "Canada's universal health-care system: achieving its potential". The Lancet. 391 (10131): 1718–1735. doi:10.1016/S0140-6736(18)30181-8. ISSN 0140-6736. PMC 7138369. PMID 29483027.
- Martin, Danielle; Adams, Evan; Caron, Nadine R (December 2018). "Canada's global leadership and Indigenous people – Authors' reply". The Lancet. 392 (10162): 817–34. doi:10.1016/S0140-6736(18)32747-8. PMID 19709728.
- Sarfati, Diana; Garvey, Gail; Robson, Bridget; Moore, Suzanne; Cunningham, Ruth; Withrow, Diana; Griffiths, Kalinda; Caron, Nadine R.; Bray, Freddie (May 2018). "Measuring cancer in indigenous populations". Annals of Epidemiology. 28 (5): 335–342. doi:10.1016/j.annepidem.2018.02.005. ISSN 1047-2797. PMID 29503062.
- Besserer, Floyd A.; Caron, Nadine R. (December 2013). "Patterns of Outdoor Recreational Injury in Northern British Columbia". Wilderness & Environmental Medicine. 24 (4): 397–401. doi:10.1016/j.wem.2013.04.004. ISSN 1080-6032. PMID 24075058.
- Caron, Nadine R.; Clark, Orlo H. (August 2005). "Papillary thyroid cancer: Surgical management of lymph node metastases". Current Treatment Options in Oncology. 6 (4): 311–322. doi:10.1007/s11864-005-0035-9. PMID 15967084. S2CID 37304708.
- Kornelsen, Jude; Iglesias, Stuart; Humber, Nancy; Caron, Nadine; Grzybowski, Stefan (2012). "GP Surgeons' Experiences of Training in British Columbia and Alberta: A Case Study of Enhanced Skills for Rural Primary Care providers". Canadian Medical Education Journal. 3 (1): e33–e41. doi:10.36834/cmej.36571. PMC 4563642. PMID 26451170.

== Honours and awards ==
- Shrum Gold Medal, top undergraduate student, Simon Fraser University, 1993
- Awards received from the University of British Columbia, Faculty of Medicine, 1997:
  - Hamber Medal
  - Dr. Jay C. Cheng Memorial Education Foundation Prize
  - Dr. Jack Margulius Memorial Prize
  - Top graduating student in Medicine, MD degree, and best cumulative record in all years of study
- Dr. John Big Canoe Memorial Scholarship, Canadian Medical Association, 1997
- "100 Canadians to Watch," Maclean's Magazine, 1997
- Outstanding Alumni Award, Simon Fraser University, 2011
- Dr. Thomas Dignan Indigenous Health Award, Royal College of Physicians and Surgeons of Canada, 2016
- "Women of the year: 12 Canadians who rocked 2016," Chatelaine Magazine
- Honorary Doctor of Science, Simon Fraser University, 2016
- Wallace Wilson Leadership Award, University of British Columbia Medical Alumni Association, 2017
- Honorary Doctor of Laws, University of the Fraser Valley, 2017
- Athletic Hall of Fame, Terry Fox Humanitarian Category, Simon Fraser University, 2019
- Inclusive Excellence Prize, Canadian Cancer Society, 2020
- Member of the Order of BC, 2022
- Director, Terry Fox Foundation (2024-)
- Inductee of the Canadian Medical Hall of Fame (formal induction June, 2025)

== Indigenous health and Canadian health policy research ==
Caron's research focuses on Indigenous health and Canadian health policy. She has made several important discoveries regarding health inequities in Canada, including the discovery that First Nations in British Columbia have higher rates of some cancers, and lower survival rates of almost all cancers, compared to non-First Nations in B.C. She also instigated a study that discovered that Indigenous peoples are 30% more likely to die after surgery than non-Indigenous peoples.
