= Sarah Robertson =

Sarah Robertson may refer to:

- Sarah Robertson (painter) (1891–1948), Canadian painter
- Sarah Robertson (field hockey) (born 1993), Scottish field hockey player
- Sarah Robertson (biologist), Australian professor of reproductive immunology
