= Ranjith Pathegama Gamage =

Geomechanical engineer and researcher

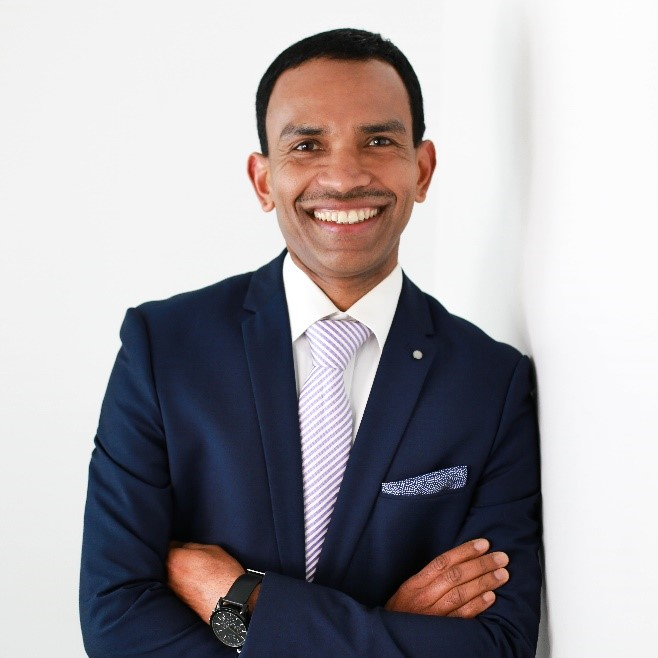
- Ranjith Pathegama Gamage.
- Born: Matara, Sri Lanka
- Education: Telijjawila Central College; University of Moratuwa(BSc); University of Wollongong(Ph.D); Monash University(DSc)
- Known for: Sustainable resource extraction and carbon sequestration
- Awards: Humboldt Research Award; Senior Fulbright Scholar
- Scientific career
- Fields: Geomechanics, critical Mineral and Resources
- Workplaces: Nanyang Technological University; Present: Monash University
- Thesis: Stress-strain and permeability characteristics of two-phase (water+gas) flow through fractured rocks (2000)
- Doctoral advisor: Buddhima Indraratna
- Other academic advisors: Winton Gale
- Doctoral students: Samintha Perera, Pabasara Wanniarachchige, Chatura Dodangodage, Treshan Perera, Fiona Harshini
- Website: University site; YouTube channel

Ranjith Pathegama Gamage is an Australian engineer and academic at Monash University, where he is a Vice-Chancellor’s Distinguished Professor in the Department of Civil and Environmental Engineering. He is known for his research of the Carbon sequestration and his development of sustainable technologies for extracting resources from deep earth and natural gas from coal seams, shale, and tight geological formations. He is a Fellow of the Australian Academy of Technology and Engineering as well as the American Society of Civil Engineers (ASCE) and Engineers Australia.

== Early life and education ==
Ranjith Pathegama Gamage was born in Sri Lanka and he received his BSc in Engineering with first class honours from the University of Moratuwa, after which he gained a PhD from the University of Wollongong, Australia. His PhD was on the “Analytical and Experimental Modelling of Coupled Water and Air Flow through Rock Joints”. His first job after the PhD was as an assistant professor at Nanyang Technological University, Singapore. He returned to Australia in 2003 to work at Monash University where he is Director of International Affairs, Professor in Geomechanics Engineering, Department of Civil Engineering.

== Academic and research career ==
Gamage is the founder and director of the Deep Earth Energy Research Lab at Monash University. In 2025–2026, he serves as a Senior Fulbright Scholar at Lawrence Berkeley National Laboratory (LBNL) in California, United States. His research areas include Carbon sequestration, unconventional oil, unconventional gas (shale gas, tight gas, coal seam gas, gas hydrate), deep geothermal energy, geomechanics, rock mechanics, enhanced oil recovery (EOR) methodologies, hydraulic fracturing, sand production from unconsolidated reservoirs, and future technologies for in-situ mining. He has also done work in converting industrial waste products into useful and environmentally sustainable materials, such as cement or fertiliser. Around 2015 he began developing a new product for sustainable deep earth resource recovery: called SREMA. He also serves as the Editor-in-Chief of the journal Geomechanics and Geophysics for GeoEnergy and GeoResource. and is the founder and Chair of the International Conference on Geomechanics for GeoEnergy and GeoResources (IC3G) which runs every two years.

In June 2026, Gamage was appointed to the inaugural cohort of Vice-Chancellor’s Distinguished Professors at Monash University, a title recognising senior professors for sustained international pre-eminence in their discipline.

== Awards and honours ==
In 2010 Gamage was named a fellow of the American Society of Civil Engineers (ASCE) and Engineers Australia. In 2017 he received a Elsevier Scopus award for Sustainability. Then in 2019, Gamage was elected as a Fellow of the Australian Academy of Technology and Engineering. In 2020 he was named a finalist for 2020 R&D 100 Awards, and was named a Fellow of Institute of Materials, Minerals and Mining (IOM3) and the Geological Society in the UK. From 2020-21 The Australian listed him as one of nine global leaders in Mining and Mineral Resources technology, and in 2021 the publication named him an Australian Field Leader in the field of Environmental and Geological Engineering. In 2021 he was also elected as Member of European Academy of Science and Arts, Europe (MAE), and in 2022 he was elected as Foreign Fellow of Indian National Academy of Engineering, India (FINAE).

In 2023 he was elected as Foreign Fellow of Chinese Academy of Engineering (FCAE). The Australian named him a Global Research Leader in Mineral Resources and Geotechnical Engineering that year, and in 2024 in Mining & Mineral Resources. In 2024, Gamage was named a Highly Cited Researcher by Clarivate. He became a Senior Fulbright Scholar in 2025, where his project “Revolutionising Critical Mineral Extraction for the Renewable Energy Transition” will be pursued at the Lawrence Berkeley National Laboratory (LBNL) in California. For his contributions to mineral and resources engineering, including advancements in geothermal energy, Gamage was awarded the Humboldt Research Award in 2025.

In 2025, he was elected a Fellow of the Royal Academy of Engineering in recognition of his significant contributions and impact in the field of sustainable resource recovery. In the same year, he was named a Clarivate Highly Cited Researcher, recognising sustained global research influence and citation impact. He also received the Australia–China Alumni Award Medal for Contribution to Cultural Exchange at the 2025 Beijing Awards Ceremony, awarded by the Australia–China Alumni Association. Additionally, he was recognised as an Australian Leader in Mining & Mineral Resources by The Australian Research Magazine for his contributions to the field. He further received the University of Wollongong Alumni Award for Research Excellence in 2025, acknowledging his research leadership and global impact. He also received the Chinese Government Friendship Award, the highest honour awarded to foreign experts for outstanding contributions to China’s development.
