= John McKechnie =

Australian judge

The Hon. John Roderick McKechnie AO KC

Commissioner of the Corruption and Crime Commission
- In office 28 June 2021 – present 28 April 2015 – 28 April 2020
- Preceded by: Roger Macknay KC

Judge, Supreme Court of Western Australia
- In office 2 March 1999 – 22 April 2015

Director of Public Prosecutions, Government of Western Australia
- In office December 1991 – 1 March 1999

Personal details
- Born: 1 November 1950 (age 75)

John Roderick McKechnie AO KC (born 1 November 1950) is the Commissioner of the Corruption and Crime Commission of Western Australia. He is a former Justice of the Supreme Court of Western Australia, the highest ranking court in the Australian State of Western Australia, and formerly served as the State's first Director of Public Prosecutions.

He attended Scotch College from 1963 until 1967, then graduated in law from the University of Western Australia in 1972. He then took articles with Jackson McDonald & Co, before joining the Crown Law Department. He became a Queen's Counsel in 1989, and then in December 1991 was appointed by the Government of Western Australia as the state's first Director of Public Prosecutions. During his eight-year term in this role, the department processed on average 2,500 prosecutions per year.

On 2 March 1999, he was sworn in as a justice of the Supreme Court of Western Australia.

He retired from the Supreme Court on 22 April 2015 to take up an appointment as the Commissioner of the Corruption and Crime Commission.

== Corruption and Crime Commissioner ==
On 28 April 2015, McKechnie was first appointed as the Commissioner of the Corruption and Crime Commission for a five-year term. During his tenure, the Corruption and Crime Commission found that a State Parliamentarian had misused an electoral allowance. McKechnie was involved in controversy following the expiration of his term as Commissioner on 25 April 2020, when his reappointment to the position was blocked by a bipartisan Parliamentary joint standing committee. In June 2021, the Western Australian Parliament passed legislation reappointing McKechnie as Commissioner without requiring the agreement of the joint standing committee, to take effect on 28 June 2021.

McKechnie was appointed an Officer of the Order of Australia in the 2024 Australia Day Honours for "distinguished service to the law, to the judiciary, and to the community of Western Australia".

== See also ==
- Judiciary of Australia
