= Gisela Kaplan =

Australian ethologist, ornithologist and primatologist

Gisela Kaplan AM
- Education: Monash University BA(Hons), DipEd, MA, PhD (1984); University of Queensland PhD(Vet.Sc.) (2005)
- Known for: Research in vocal behaviour, animal communication and cognition
- Scientific career
- Fields: Ethology, ornithology, primatology
- Workplaces: Monash University, University of New England
- Theses: The Politics of Survival (a critical study in Sociology of Literature) (1984); The Vocal Behaviour of Australian Magpies (Gymnorhina tibicen) (2005)

Gisela Kaplan AM FRSN is an Australian ethologist who primarily specialises in ornithology and primatology. She is a professor emeritus in animal behaviour at the University of New England, Australia, and also honorary professor of the Queensland Brain Institute.

== Academic career ==
Kaplan graduated from Monash University with a Doctor of Philosophy.

She published her first book with Clive Kessler, Hannah Arendt: Thinking, Judging, Freedom in 1989, followed by Contemporary Western European Feminism in 1990. In 2005, she submitted a second thesis, titled Vocal behaviour of Australian magpies (Gymnorhina tibicen).

In 2011, Kaplan was awarded an honorary Doctorate of Science by the University of New England. In 2015, she was conferred honorary fellow of the American Ornithological Society. The following year, she was awarded the status of emeritus professor by the University of New England. She also received the Whitley Award in Behavioural Zoology for her book Bird Minds in 2017.

She has given interviews for ABC Radio.

In March 2021 Kaplan was elected Fellow of the Royal Society of New South Wales. She was appointed an Honorary Member of the Order of Australia in the 2024 Australia Day Honours for her "significant service to science education through research into animal behaviour".

== Personal life ==
In the 1990s, she began hand-raising and rehabilitating native birds, which she continues to do in her spare time.

== Publications ==
Kaplan has published over 250 research articles and 23 books in total. Since 2000, she has focused on animal vocal behaviour, communication and cognition specifically in birds and primates.

=== Selected books ===
- Kaplan, G. (2019) Bird Bonds. Sex, mate-choice and cognition in Australian native birds. Macmillan Australia, Sydney. ISBN 9781760554200 368 pp https://www.panmacmillan.com.au/9781760554200/gkaplan/
- Kaplan, Gisela (2019) Australian Magpie: Biology and Behaviour of an Unusual Songbird. 2nd edition, CSIRO Publishing, Melbourne. ISBN 9781486307241 pbk. 280 pp
- Kaplan, Gisela (2007, 2018) Tawny Frogmouth. 2nd ed., CSIRO, Melbourne. ISBN 9781486308163 pbk.168 pp
- Kaplan Gisela (2015) Bird Minds. Cognition and behaviour of Australian native species. CSIRO Publishing, Melbourne. ISBN 9781486300181 286 pp
- Kaplan, Gisela (2004, 2005, 2008) Australian Magpie: Biology and Behaviour of an Unusual Songbird. Natural History Series, University of New South Wales Press, Sydney & CSIRO 1st ed., Melbourne. ISBN 0-643 09068 1 pbk.142 pp
- Kaplan, G (2005) The Vocal Behaviour of Australian Magpies (Gymnorhina tibicen): A Study of Vocal Development, Song Learning, Communication and Mimicry in the Australian Magpie. PhD thesis, School of Veterinary Sciences, University of Queensland, St. Lucia, Brisbane.
- Rogers, Lesley J. and Kaplan, Gisela eds. (2004) Comparative Vertebrate Cognition: Are Primates Superior to Non-primates? Kluwer Primatology Series: Developments in Primatology: Progress and Prospect. Kluwer Academic /Plenum Publishers, New York, Boston, Dordrecht, London, Moscow. ISBN 0-306-47727-0 Hbk, 386 pp
- Kaplan, G (2003) Famous Australian Birds. Allen & Unwin, Melbourne. ISBN 1 86508 835 8 Hbk 48 pp
- Kaplan, G and Rogers, LJ (2001) Birds. Their Habits and Skills, Allen & Unwin, Sydney. ISBN 1 86508 376 3, 272 pp
- Kaplan, G and Rogers, L.J. (2000) The Orang-utans. Their Evolution, Behavior, and Future. Perseus Publishing, Cambridge, Mass. ISBN 0 7382 0290 8 (re-edited from 1999), 191 pp
- Rogers, L.J. and Kaplan, G (2000) Songs, Roars and Rituals. Communication in birds, mammals and other animals. Harvard University Press, Cambridge (completely rev. version of 1998 pub. Not Only Roars and Rituals). ISBN 0674000587, 207 pp
- Kaplan, G and Rogers, LJ (1994) Orang-Utans in Borneo, University of New England Press. ISBN 1-875821-13-9, 196 pp

=== Selected book chapters ===
- Rogers, L.J. and Kaplan, G. (2024) Advances in understanding cognition in animals. Ch.4 in L.Levitt, D. B. Rosengard, J.Rubin (eds.) Animals as Crime Victims: Multidisciplinary implications of moving beyond the property paradigm. (pp.53-66) Edward Elgar Publishing. https://doi.org/10.4337/9781802209884.00012
- Palmer, G.C., Kaplan, G,. Teixeira, D., Stojanovic, D., Peters, A., Douglas, T.K. (2022) “Perching birds and parrots”, pp. 584-592 (Ch 33) in Wildlife Research in Australia (Eds B Smith, HP Waudby, C Alberthsen & JO Hampton). CSIRO Publishing, Melbourne.
- Kaplan, G. (2021) You can make friends with magpies. Here is how. In: A. Hansen (Ed.) No, you’re not entitled to your opinion. And 49 other essays that got the world talking. Thames & Hudson Australia., Port Melbourne.
- Rogers, LJ and Kaplan G (2019) Does functional lateralization in birds have any implications for their welfare? Special Issue: Brain Functional Lateralization in Animals. (Ed. A. Quaranta). Symmetry, 11, 1043; doi:10.3390/sym11081043
- Kaplan, G (2018). Passerine Cognition. (10,000-word entry): In: Encyclopedia of Animal Cognition and Behavior. Ed. by Jennifer Vonk, Todd K. Shackelford, Springer International Publishing AG/Nature, 6330 Cham, Switzerland
- Kaplan, G (2016) Don Quixote's Windmills. Ch. 14 in Thinking about Animals in the Age of the Anthropocene. (eds. M. Tønnessen, K. Armstrong-Oma and S. Rattasepp) pp. 284–305. Lexington Books (imprint of Rowman & Littlefield). New York, London.
- Kaplan, G (2008). The Australian Magpie (Gymnorhina tibicen): An alternative model for the study of songbird neurobiology. In P. Zeigler and P. Marler (eds). The Neuroscience of Birdsong. Cambridge University Press, Cambridge, UK, ISBN 9780521869157 pp. 153–170.
- Rogers, LJ and Kaplan, G (2005). An Eye for a Predator: Lateralization in birds, with particular reference to the Australian magpie (Gymnorhina tibicen). Behavioral and Morphological Asymmetries in Vertebrates, eds. Yegor Malashichev and Wallace Deckel. Landes Bioscience, Georgetown, TX. ISBN 1-58706-105-8 (online)
- Kaplan, G and Rogers, LJ (2004) Charles Darwin and animal behavior. In M. Bekoff and Jane Goodall (eds.) Encyclopedia of Animal Behavior. 3 vols, Greenwood Publishing, Westport, CT, ISBN 0-313-32745-9, vol.2, pp. 471–479 (introductory essay to vol.2).
- Kaplan, G (2004) Magpie Mimicry. In M. Bekoff and Jane Goodall (eds.) Encyclopedia of Animal Behavior. 3 vols., Greenwood Publishing, Westport, CT, ISBN 0-313-32745-9, vol.2, pp. 772–774
- Rogers, LJ and Kaplan, G (2004) All animals are not equal: the interface between scientific knowledge and the legislation for animal rights. In: CR Sunstein and M Nussbaum (eds.) Animal Rights: Law and Policy. Oxford University Press, Oxford, ISBN 0-19-515217-4, pp. 175–204.
- Kaplan, Gisela (2004). "Meaningful Communication in Primates, Birds, and Other Animals". Comparative Vertebrate Cognition. pp. 189–223. doi:10.1007/978-1-4419-8913-0_6. ISBN 978-1-4613-4717-0. In Rogers, LJ and Kaplan, G (eds) Comparative Vertebrate Cognition: Are Primates Superior to Nonprimates? Kluwer Primatology Series: Developments in Primatology: Progress and Prospect. Kluwer Academic /Plenum Publishers, New York.
- Kaplan, G (1998). Economic Development and Ecotourism in Malaysia. The Shaping of Malaysia. Eds. A Kaur & I Metcalfe, St. Martin's Press. London, New York. ISBN 1349270792, 9781349270798
- Kaplan, Gisela (1999). "Environment and Ecotourism". The Shaping of Malaysia. pp. 173–195. doi:10.1007/978-1-349-27079-8_8. ISBN 978-1-349-27081-1. In: Kaur A., Metcalfe I. (eds) The Shaping of Malaysia. Studies in the Economies of East and South-East Asia. Palgrave Macmillan, London
- Kaplan, G.; Rogers, L. (1995). "Of Human Fear and Indifference". The Neglected Ape. pp. 3–12. doi:10.1007/978-1-4899-1091-2_1. ISBN 978-1-4899-1093-6. In RD Nader, B Galdikas, L Sheehan & N Rosen (eds.) The Neglected Ape. Plenum Press, New York
