= Leigh Burgoyne =

Australian molecular biologist

Leigh Alexander Burgoyne AM (born 1939) is an Australian molecular biologist. He is emeritus professor at Flinders University.

The 1973 paper Burgoyne co-authored with Dean Hewish was important in developing chromatin theory.

Burgoyne became a Member of the Order of Australia in the 2024 Australia Day Honours for "significant service to science, particularly through the development of DNA technologies."
