= Joan Benjamin =

Australian academic

Joan Benjamin OAM
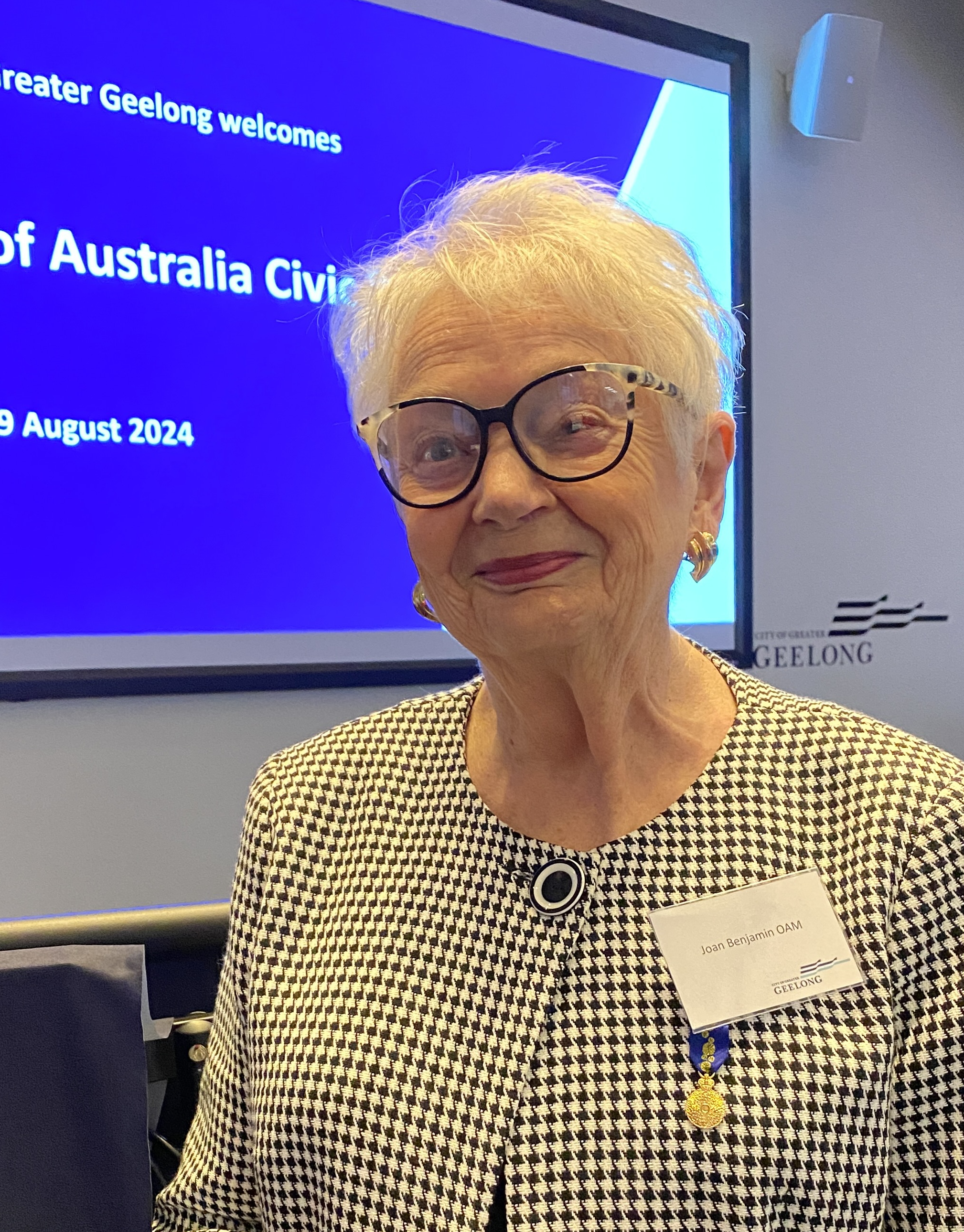
- Occupations: Educator, academic, social researcher, activist
- Known for: Poverty education, Youth Work education, Medical education
- Awards: Medal of the Order of Australia (2024)

Joan Benjamin is an Australian academic and educator from Highton, Victoria. She has held teaching and research positions at several Victorian universities, including the University of Melbourne, RMIT, Deakin University, and Monash University.

Her career has focused on social justice and tertiary education, spanning research on poverty at the Brotherhood of St Laurence to leadership in school governance, youth affairs, and medical education.

Benjamin was awarded the Medal of the Order of Australia (OAM) in the 2024 Australia Day Honours for her "service to tertiary education."

== Career ==
Benjamin began her career teaching children in their first years of schooling at inner suburban schools in Melbourne, Victoria. She taught in government schools for seven years after completing a Certificate of Teaching at Melbourne Teachers College in 1964. Whilst in her final year, she edited the annual magazine, Trainee.

In the early 1970s, Benjamin worked with social reformer Concetta Benn at the Brotherhood of St. Laurence (BSL) in Fitzroy. Together, they developed the 4 Power "Developmental Model" of empowerment, which analyzed the redistribution of resources, decision-making, information, and relationships to those living in poverty.

During this period, Benjamin led the Poverty Education Project, which aimed to analyse poverty as a structural issue. Her research and final reports from this era are held in the collections of the National Library of Australia and the State Library Victoria:

- Poverty Education Resource Centre: Progress Report (1979)
- The Poverty Education Project: Final Report (1981)

From 1989 to 1993, Benjamin served as Chair of the Youth Affairs Council Victoria (YACVic) following her time as a member of the State Youth Council of Victoria. During this period, she was a lecturer in Youth Work and Community Development courses at the Phillip Institute of Technology and later a Senior Lecturer at RMIT University. While at RMIT, Benjamin wrote the textbook Making Groups Work: Rethinking Practice (1997), with Judith Bessant and Rob Watts. The text proposed a sociological approach to group work in the youth and community sectors. Applying principles from her poverty research, Benjamin argued that practitioners must address structural power imbalances between facilitators and participants.

Her "three themes" of youth work enlightenment, empowerment, and enterprise, established a framework for training youth workers in Australia and continues to be cited in academic literature regarding the sector's professionalisation.

Whilst at RMIT, Benjamin was involved in teaching, academic development and research; contributing to conference presentations and journal articles. Notably working on the introduction of the Scholarship of Teaching and Learning into Australia.

Benjamin served as a Medical Education Officer for the Postgraduate Medical Council of Victoria (PMCV). She participated in the development of the Victorian Junior Doctor Curriculum and convened the Victorian Medical Education Officers Group (2001–2004). Her research regarding clinical learning environments was published in the Medical Journal of Australia.

== Community service ==
- Australian Health Practitioner Regulation Agency (AHPRA): Member of the Professional Performance and Standards panels (2007–2019), overseeing professional conduct and competency.
- National Convenor, Community Australia: (1994–1996).
- Director and Board Member, Northern Futures Ltd: A Geelong-based organisation addressing socio-economic disadvantage (2017-2023).

Benjamin served as the Chair of the School Council for Exhibition Girls High School from 1976 to 1983. Her tenure coincided with the school’s 1976 renaming from Fitzroy Girls’ High and its transformation into an academically diverse institution serving the inner-city migrant community. Records of her leadership are preserved in the Public Record Office Victoria (PROV):

- Agency VA 3771: Exhibition High School No. 7831 (formerly Fitzroy Girls' Secondary School).

Benjamin also served as Chair of the School Council of Princes Hill Secondary College in 1992.

== Selected publications ==
- Benjamin, Joan; Bessant, Judith; Watts, Rob (1997). Making Groups Work: Rethinking Practice. Allen & Unwin. ISBN 1864483040.
- Benjamin, Joan (2000). "The Scholarship of Teaching in Teams: What Does It Look Like in Practice?". Higher Education Research & Development. 19 (2): 191–204. doi:10.1080/072943600445646.
- Benjamin, Joan (1981). The Poverty Education Project: final report. Brotherhood of St Laurence. ISBN 0-909571-88-0.
- Benjamin, Joan (1985). Australian values: do young people share them?. Youth Affairs Council of Australia. ISBN 0908017278.
- Benjamin, Joan; Morgan, Lyn (November 2017). "From jobless to job ready: Understanding transformational outcomes at Northern Futures" (PDF). National Employment Solutions Conference Proceedings. Australian and New Zealand Mental Health Association. pp. 4–17. ISBN 978-1-922232-63-2.
- Benjamin, J (2006). "Learning opportunities for Australian prevocational hospital doctors". Medical Journal of Australia. 184 (9): 436–440.
- Benjamin, Joan (1977). Life's Not Meant To Be Impossible (PDF). Brotherhood of St Laurence.
- Benjamin, Joan (2017). "The Heart of the Matter: Supportive Pathways to Sustainable Employment". Northern Futures, Geelong.

== Honours and awards ==
- Medal of the Order of Australia (OAM) in the General Division (2024) – "For service to tertiary education."
