= Julie Leask =

Public health researcher

Julie Leask AO
- Born: Sydney, Australia
- Other name: Julie-Anne Leask
- Occupation: Social scientist
- Employer: University of Sydney
- Known for: Vaccine research
- Title: Professor

Julie Leask AO is an Australian social scientist and professor in the School of Public Health and Sydney Infectious Diseases Institute at the University of Sydney, Australia. She is a leading researcher on social and behavioural aspects of vaccination and infectious disease prevention. Leask's research focuses on vaccine uptake, communication, trust, strengthening vaccination programs and policy. Her flagship project is Sharing Knowledge About Immunisation (SKAI), a vaccination communication package designed to improve vaccination conversations between parents and health care workers. Additionally, Leask is an advisor to the World Health Organization (WHO) on vaccine acceptance and demand issues and was the chair of the WHO Measuring Behavioural and Social Drivers of Vaccination working group (2018–2022).

== Education ==
Leask holds a Diploma in Health Science (Nursing) from the University of Technology Sydney (1990), a Certificate of Midwifery Theory and Practice from the Northern Sydney Area Midwifery School (1992), a Master of Public Health from the University of Sydney (1998) and a Doctor of Philosophy (Ph.D.) also from the University of Sydney (2002). Her Ph.D. thesis was titled Understanding Immunisation Controversies.

== Professional academic life ==
Leask's Masters treatise in 1997 described the major themes in anti-vaccination reporting in the Australian print media. After completing her Ph.D. in 2002, Leask established the Social Science Unit at the National Centre for Immunisation Research and Surveillance. In 2012, she was appointed as an NHMRC Career Development Fellow at the School of Public Health, University of Sydney. In 2017, she moved to the Susan Wakil School of Nursing and Midwifery, Faculty of Medicine and Health, The University of Sydney, becoming Professor in 2018. She is Visiting Professorial Fellow at the National Centre for Immunisation Research and Surveillance. She currently co-leads the Social and Behavioural Insights in Immunisation research group at the University of Sydney – a team of postdoctoral researchers, research assistants, and higher degree research students.

== Research and impact ==
Leask's research and impact extend over more than two decades. Her research centres around: (1) identifying the causes of low vaccination with quality data; (2) synthesising and translating evidence for raising vaccination rates; (3) building the capacity of researchers, practitioners, and program managers in closing coverage gaps and improving program delivery; and (4) improving public communication in health emergencies.

Leask led the development of Sharing Knowledge About Immunisation (SKAI) - a vaccination communication package designed to improve vaccination conversations between parents and healthcare workers. SKAI provides communication strategies, tailored resources, a website, and a training module. SKAI was implemented nationally in Australia through the National Centre for Immunisation Research and Surveillance.

Leask's current focus is on global tools to diagnose and act on the causes of low vaccination. Her chairing role with WHO focused on quality measures of the reasons for the under-vaccination of children and COVID-19 vaccination in adults and healthcare workers. These surveys and interview guides measure the Behavioural and Social Drivers of Vaccination (BeSD) within the domains of (1) Thinking and feeling about vaccines; (2) Social processes that drive or inhibit vaccination; (3) Motivation (or hesitancy) to seek vaccination; and (4) Practical issues involved in seeking and receiving a vaccination. These tools are now being used in multiple countries to determine barriers to routine immunisation.

== International expert contributions ==
Leask's international expert contributions to vaccination include the World Health Organization (WHO), UNICEF, International Federation for the Red Cross and Red Crescent Societies, US Centre for Diseases Control and Prevention, and the US President's Cancer Panel. She has held international advisory roles with the WHO working group for measuring the Behavioural and Social Drivers of Vaccination (Chair 2018–2022); the WHO Immunization and Vaccines related Implementation Research advisory committee (2019-2023); the WHO South East Asia Region Immunisation Technical Advisory Group (2020-2023); and was the lead guidance writer for the COVID-19 vaccine safety communication manual for the WHO Global Advisory Committee of Vaccine Safety. She was a co-author on a commissioned review paper on increasing vaccination uptake for Psychological Sciences in the Public Interest.

== Publications ==
Leask has over 154 publications, as at August 2025. Select publications include the following:

- Robinson P, Degeling C, Wiley K, Carter S, Leask J. Evidence gaps and challenges in maintaining and increasing vaccine uptake: A Delphi survey with Australian stakeholders. Health Promot J Austral. 2024. https://doi.org/10.1002/hpja.875.
- Leask, J., Seale, H., Williams, J.H., Kaufman, J., Wiley, K., Mahimbo, A., Clark, K.K., Danchin, M.H. and Attwell, K. (2021), Policy considerations for mandatory COVID-19 vaccination from the Collaboration on Social Science and Immunisation. Med J Aust, 215: 499-503. https://doi.org/10.5694/mja2.51269.
- Carlson, S.J., Blyth, C.C., Beard, F.H., Hendry, A.J., Cheng, A.C., Quinn, H.E., Leask, J. and Macartney, K. (2021), Influenza disease and vaccination in children in Australia. Med J Aust, 215: 64-67.e1. https://doi.org/10.5694/mja2.51100.

== Awards and honours ==
- Appointed Officer of the Order of Australia in the 2024 Australia Day Honours for "distinguished service to health and medical research, to policy advice, and to enhancing community understanding of immunisation"
- Rosemary Bryant Award, Australian Primary Health Care Nurses Association, July, 2023
- President's Award, Public Health Association of Australia – group award for the Collaboration on Social Science and Immunisation, 2022
- Supervisor of the Year (Medicine), Sydney University Postgraduate Representative Association, 2021
- Vice-Chancellor's Award for Outstanding Contribution to the University Community, University of Sydney, 2021
- Overall winner of the Australian Financial Review's 100 Women of Influence awards in recognition of her work in improving vaccination rates both in Australia as well as on a global level, 2019
- Vice-chancellor's Award for Excellence -Outstanding Research Engagement and Innovation, for Sharing Knowledge About Immunisation, 2019 http://www.talkingaboutimmunisation.org.au/
- Winner, Art in Science Competition, Westmead Research Hub, video category, 2018
- Public Health Impact Award, PHAA NSW, 2015
- Sax Institute Research Action Award, 2015 (inaugural)
- National Health and Medical Research Council Career Development Fellowship, 2013-2017
- Teaching Award: Excellence in Postgraduate Supervision. Discipline of Paediatrics and Child Health, University of Sydney, 2011
