= Gail Garvey =

Indigenous Australian Researcher

Gail Garvey AM
- Education: Charles Darwin University
- Scientific career
- Fields: Indigenous health and wellbeing
- Workplaces: Menzies School of Health Research
- Thesis: Psychosocial aspects of cancer care for Indigenous Australians (2016)

Gail Garvey AM is an Indigenous Australian Health Services Researcher with a core focus on Psycho-oncology and Indigenous people. Garvey is a Kamilaroi woman whose family originated from Moree in western New South Wales. She was a professor at the Menzies School of Health, and served as a Senior Principal Research Fellow and Deputy Division Leader for the Wellbeing and Preventable Chronic Diseases Division. In 2021, she was appointed as a Professor at the University of Queensland, Brisbane.

== Academic career ==
Garvey began her career in education. She completed a Bachelor of Education (Physical Education) at Newcastle College of Advanced Education in 1986 and a Master of Education (Research) at the University of Newcastle in 2000 and a PhD at Charles Darwin University in 2016. Her thesis investigated Psychosocial aspects of cancer care for Indigenous Australians.

Garvey's research career has focused on investigating cancer experiences and outcomes of Indigenous Australians. She has publicly advocated for better prevention and treatment of cancer in remote areas in Australia. Her work in cancer has illuminated critical shortcomings in health system performance for Indigenous Australians affected by cancer and has identified pathways to improve equity of access and outcomes. Garvey has been very active in developing protocols that reduce cancer rates in indigenous populations, and putting in place screening strategies that are more culturally appropriate for local populations.

== Awards and recognition ==
In 2009 Garvey won the Our Women, Our State Awards award.

In 2015 Garvey won the Harry Christian Giese – Research into Action Award.

In 2016 Garvey won both the Bupa Health Foundation Award – Emerging Health Researcher and the Lowitja Institute Cranlana Award.

In 2020 Garvey won the Alumni Medal for Professional Excellence.

Garvey was appointed a Member of the Order of Australia in the 2024 Australia Day Honours for her "significant service to Indigenous health, and cancer research".

In 2025 Garvey won the Tom Reeve Award for Outstanding Contributions to Cancer Care.

== Selected works ==
- Celebrating 20 years : Aboriginal and Torres Strait Islander medical education. Newcastle, NSW: University of Newcastle, [2006].
- Diana Sarfati; Bridget Robson; Gail Garvey; Teresa Goza; Sunia Foliaki; Elinor Millar; Nina Scott; participants of the Indigenous Peoples and Cancer Symposium (1 June 2018). "Improving the health of Indigenous people globally". The Lancet Oncology. 19 (6): e276. doi:10.1016/s1470-2045(18)30336-x. ISSN 1470-2045. PMID 29893251. Wikidata Q89074104.
