= Buddhima Indraratna =

Australian academic

Buddhima Indraratna AM
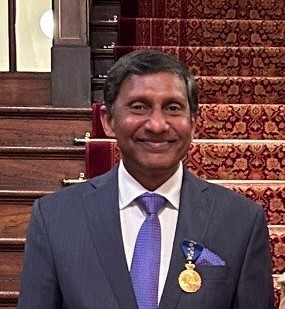
- Indraratna in 2024
- Born: Kandy, Sri Lanka
- Citizenship: Australia, Sri Lanka
- Occupations: Civil Engineer, Academic
- Known for: Transportation geotechnics, Ground improvement, Railway engineering
- Awards: Member of the Order of Australia (2024); Sir John Holland Civil Engineer of the Year (Institution of Engineers Australia) (2024); 6th International Civil Engineer Award by Jose E. Ibarra Foundation, Madrid, Spain. (2024); IACMAG “Outstanding Contributions Medal” in recognition of life-time contributions to geotechnical engineering (2017); Railway Technical Society of Australasia (RTSA) & Engineers Australia Award for contributions to rail innovations (2015)

Academic background
- Education: Ananda College; United World College of the Atlantic; Imperial College London; University of Alberta
- Thesis: Application of Fully Grouted Bolts in Yielding Rock (1987)
- Doctoral advisor: Peter K. Kaiser
- Other advisors: Dave Chan, D. J. Laurie Kennedy

Academic work
- Doctoral students: Ranjith Pathegama Gamage, William Glamore, Cholachat Rujikiatkamjorn, Behzad Fatahi, Trung Ngo, Ana Heitor, Shiran Gunasena Galpathage, Yujie Qi, Thanh Nguyen
- Notable works: Utilisation of mining waste and recycled rubber for railway ballast

Buddhima Indraratna is a Sri Lankan-born Australian civil engineer and academic specializing in geotechnical engineering. He is a Distinguished Professor of Civil Engineering at the University of Technology Sydney and the Director of its Transport Research Centre. He is recognized for his contributions to transportation geomechanics, particularly rail and road infrastructure, ground improvement, and sustainable use of recycled materials. In 2024, he was appointed a Member of the Order of Australia for significant service to civil engineering. He is also the winner of 6th International Civil Engineer Award in 2024 for lifetime outstanding contributions to Civil Engineering (José E. Ibarra Foundation, Madrid, Spain) and 2024 Sir John Holland Civil Engineer of the Year (Institution of Engineers Australia).

During the 50th Anniversary of the Australian Geomechanics Society (AGS) in 2022, Indraratna was honoured as an AGS Life Member for outstanding contributions over many years to the geotechnical community. He is also a Fellow of the Australian Academy of Technological Sciences and Engineering (FTSE), Fellow of the Royal Society of NSW (FRSN), Institution of Engineers Australia (FIEAust), Life Member and Fellow of the American Society of Civil Engineers (FASCE), Geological Society of UK (FGS), Australasian Institute of Mining and Metallurgy (FAusIMM) and Institution of Engineers Sri Lanka (FIESL).

== Early life and education ==
Indraratna was born in Sri Lanka to a family of doctors. He attended Ananda College and later received the Lord Mountbatten Scholarship to study at the United World College of the Atlantic in Wales, UK. His youngest uncle was a civil engineer in the UK and he was fascinated by his drawings, getting him keen to explore more about his drawings and got interested to pursue civil engineering. He earned his BSc (Hons) in Civil Engineering from Imperial College London and went to the industry, realising that his undergraduate knowledge is near the knowledge of understanding complicated field problems when working on dams and tunnel projects. This prompted him to head back to Imperial College London to earn a MSc in Soil Mechanics and Engineering Seismology. He completed his PhD in Geotechnical Engineering at the University of Alberta in 1987.

== Academic career ==
After working as a senior research engineer at the Geomechanics Research Centre in Ontario, Canada, Indraratna began his traditional academic career at the Asian Institute of Technology (AIT) in Thailand (1988–1991), followed by a long tenure at the University of Wollongong for nearly 3 decades. He started doing research on railways once he arrived in Australia when realising that Australia needs significant improvements when compared to the rest of the developed countries and no other researcher in Australia was working on railway tracks. His research caught the attention of railway organisations in New South Wales when the Summer Olympic Games was announced in 1997 and they interested in him doing further research to cater for the higher demand during that time. He later joined the University of Technology Sydney (UTS) as Distinguished Professor and Director of the Transport Research Centre.

== Research and contributions ==
Indraratna is known for his work on:

- Stabilising soft soils, transport embankments and landslides using principles of ground improvement such as stone columns, prefabricated vertical drains and vacuum preloading
- Track foundation design, ballast degradation modeling, and lateral confinement using geosynthetics
- Recycled material use in transport infrastructure, including patented rubber tyre–reinforced foundations
- Geoenvironmental solutions for acid sulfate soils and groundwater contamination

He has published over 1,100 scholarly works, including nearly 550 peer-reviewed journal articles and 14 books. His work has been cited over 35,000 times, with an h-index of 97. According to ScholarGPS, Indraratna is ranked second worldwide in Geotechnics over the past five years and fourth all-time. He is also listed among the top three scholars of all time in Geotechnical Engineering. In his career, he has successfully supervised over 90 PhD students and nearly 50 Postdoctoral fellows.

== Patents and standards ==
He holds a patent for the tyre-cell track foundation (Australian Patent No. 2018214448), and contributed to:

- AS 2758.7 (Railway ballast standards)
- AS 8700 (Vertical drains)
- AS 1726 (Geotechnical site investigations)

== Awards and honors ==
- 2009 – EH Davis Memorial Lecture of the Australian Geomechanics Society for distinguished contributions to Geomechanics.
- 2009 – B-HERT (Business-Higher Education Round Table) Award: "Best Research & Development Collaboration: Rail Track Innovations in Australia". c/o Australian Commonwealth, Dept. of Education, Employment & Workplace Relations.
- 2010 – Vice-Chancellor's Award for Outstanding Research, Uni. of Wollongong Australia.
- 2011 – Engineers Australia Transport Medal for distinguished contributions to transport infrastructure through original research
- 2012 – Robert M. Quigley Commendation Award by the Canadian Geotechnical Society for outstanding contribution through article in Canadian Geotechnical Journal in the field of soft soil stabilisation by vacuum consolidation
- 2014 – CS Desai Excellence Medal for outstanding contributions to geotechnical teaching and research, IACMAG.
- 2015 – Railway Technical Society of Australasia (RTSA) & Engineers Australia Award for contributions to rail innovations
- 2016 – Ralph Proctor Inaugural Lecture of ISSMGE (delivered in Portugal, Sept 2016) for outstanding academic and research achievements and professional contributions in the field of transportation geotechnics.
- 2017 – IACMAG “Outstanding Contributions Medal” in recognition of life-time contributions to geotechnical engineering. awarded by the International Association of Computer Methods & Advances in Geomechanics (IACMAG).
- 2017 – 4th Louis Menard Lecture, ISSMGE
- 2021 – Robert M. Quigley Commendation Award (Canadian Geotechnical Society) for outstanding contribution to the profession through publication in the Can. Geotech. J. (Undrained Soil Instability under Triaxial Conditions)
- 2022 – 9th Stephen Marich Annual Lecture for distinguished services and achievements in Railway Technology
- 2022 – Honorary Life Member, Australian Geomechanics Society
- 2023 – ICE (UK)- Sir Visvesvaraya award for outstanding overseas contribution
- 2023 – Henry Steel Olcott Memorial Oration, Ananda College, Colombo, Sri Lanka (Topic: Recent Advances in Transport Infrastructure)
- 2024 – Member of the Order of Australia (AM) (26 January 2024; Australia Day)
- 2024 – Sir John Holland Civil Engineer of the Year (Institution of Engineers Australia) for lifetime contributions
- 2024 – International Civil Engineer award by José Entrecanales Ibarra Foundation (Madrid, Spain) for lifetime outstanding contributions to Civil Engineering.
- 2025 – Fellow, Royal Society of New South Wales
- 2025 – 5th CGS Distinguished Lecturer of the year 2025, Canadian Geotechnical Society
- 2025 – Thomas Keefer Medal, Canadian Civil Engineering Society.
