= Carolyn Geczy =

Australian immunologist

Carolyn Geczy AM is an Australian scientist in the field of immunology and a former professor. Geczy's scientific achievements include generating the first neutralising antibody against cytokine macrophage migration inhibitor factor and major contributions to our understanding of S100 proteins in inflammatory diseases.

== Awards ==
- 2024, Member of the Order of Australia (AM).
- 2018, Sydney Local Health District Mentor of the Year Award.
- 2005, Women in Inflammation Science Award, International Association of Inflammation Societies.
