= Debbie Silvester =

British-Australian chemist

Professor Debbie Silvester OAM FRACI FRSC
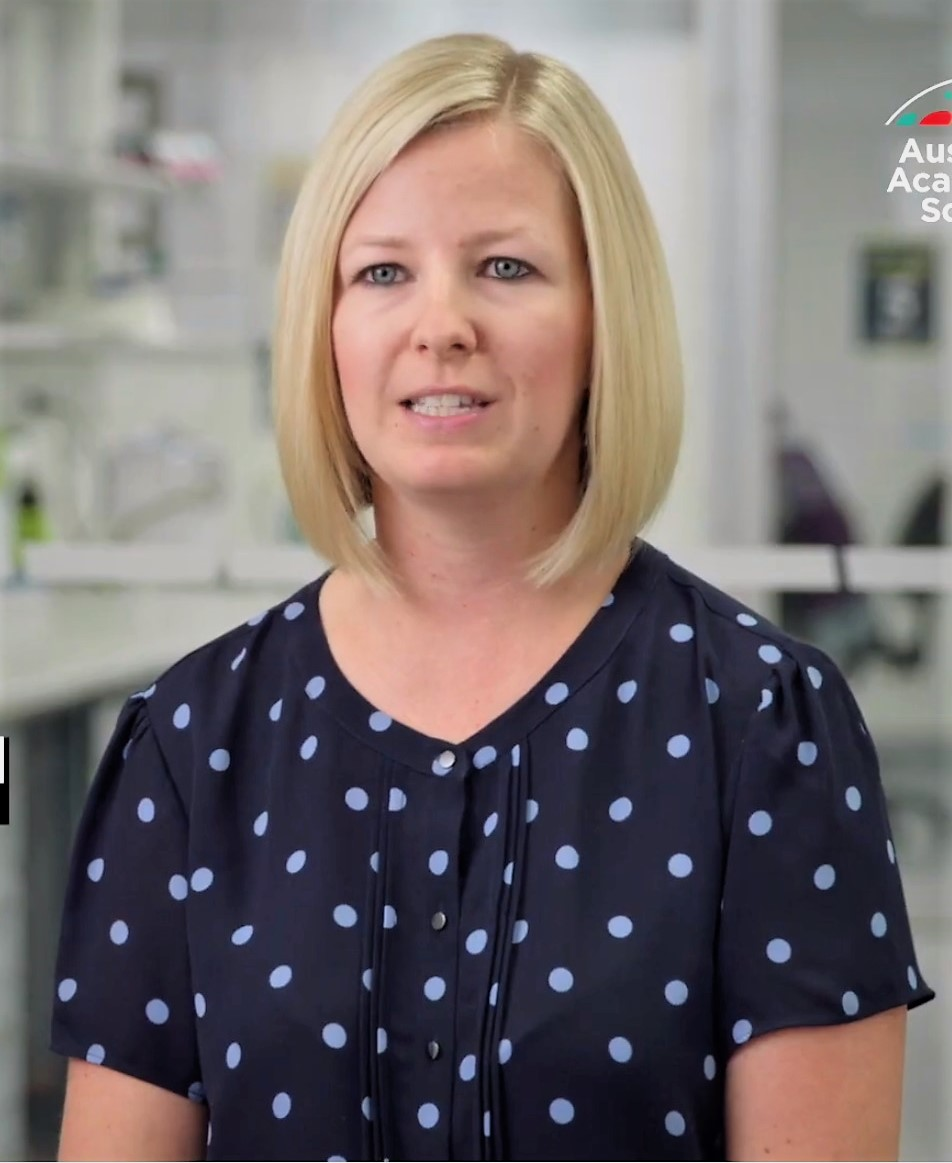
- Debbie Silvester-Dean in an Australian Academy of Science video in 2021
- Born: Chelmsford, Essex, England
- Education: University of Bristol; University of Oxford
- Scientific career
- Workplaces: Curtin University
- Thesis: Electrochemical studies in room temperature ionic liquids (2008)
- Doctoral advisor: Richard G. Compton

Debbie Sue Silvester-Dean is a British-Australian chemist who is a professor at Curtin University. Her research considers electrochemical processes and sensing. She has explored room-temperature ionic liquids. In 2021, she was awarded the Australian Academy of Science Le Fèvre Medal.

== Early life and education ==
Silvester was born in Essex in the United Kingdom. She was an undergraduate student at the University of Bristol, where she earned a master's degree in 2005. She competed her third year project with Royce W. Murray at the University of North Carolina, USA. She moved to the University of Oxford for graduate studies, where she studied room temperature ionic liquids using electrochemistry. Her doctoral research was supervised by Richard G. Compton. After a two-month internship Schlumberger Cambridge Research Centre, Silvester joined Curtin University as a postdoctoral scholar.

== Research and career ==
Silvester has studied the electrochemical behaviour of room-temperature ionic liquids, which can be used to sense toxic gases and explosives. The electrochemical interactions of ionic liquids can be used to detect gases such as ammonia and chlorine. Silvester has shown that ionic liquids that contain hexafluorophosphate ions cannot detect hydrogen chloride because they form hydrogen fluoride. Redox active explosive compounds including TNT can be detected using electrochemistry by monitoring the reduction of the nitro groups. She showed that the reaction mechanisms are different in ionic liquids to how they behave in water. In ionic liquids, the nitro groups undergo a 1 electron reduction, whilst in water they undergo a 6 electron reduction at every nitro group.

Owing to their large sizes and complexities of miniaturisation, electrochemical cells are inappropriate for real-world sensing applications. Silvester developed a variety of device architectures with planar electrodes, including screen printed, thin film and microarray thin film electrodes. To enhance the sensitivity of the devices, Silvester has proposed surface-modified electrodes (including platinum nanoparticles and electrodeposited porous nanostructures). This patterning improves the radial diffusion, allowing for sub ppm gas sensing.

Silvester showed that by combining her ionic liquids with poly(methyl methacrylate) it was possible to form a gel-like material that can remain stable in various orientations, making the devices much more robust and adaptable to the demands of gas sensing. Ionic liquid - PMMA blends can be used for the long term detection of high oxygen concentrations. Her room-temperature ionic liquids can also permit the detection of ions in water with high levels of sensitivity. She believes that this occurs due to void-assisted pairing between the protons within the ions of the water with the anions of the room-temperature ionic liquids.

Beyond ionic liquids, Silvester has developed mesoporous materials for hydrogen storage.

== Awards and honours ==
- 2013 Royal Australian Chemical Institute electrochemistry division Alan M Bond Medal
- 2017 Royal Australian Chemical Institute analytical & environmental division Peter W Alexander Medal
- 2019 Australian Institute of Policy and Science WA Young Tall Poppy Award
- 2019 Royal Australian Chemical Institute Rennie Memorial Medal
- 2020 Analytical Scientist Power List
- 2020 Elected Fellow of the Royal Australian Chemical Institute
- 2021 Australian Academy of Science Le Fèvre Medal
- 2021 Royal Australian Chemical Institute Physical Chemistry Lectureship
- 2021 Women in Technology WA Awards: Tech [+] 20 winner, Outstanding STEM Educator and First Among Equals winner.
- 2021 Royal Society of Chemistry Analyst Emerging Investigator Lectureship
- 2022 International Society of Electrochemistry Tajima Prize
- 2024 Medal of the Order of Australia
