= Sarah Robertson (biologist) =

Australian reproductive biologist and researcher

Sarah Robertson AO FAA FAHMS
- Education: University of Adelaide
- Scientific career
- Workplaces: University of Adelaide

Sarah Anne Robertson is an Australian biologist who is a fellow of both the Australian Academy of Science and Australian Academy for Health and Medical Sciences, and Professor of Reproductive Immunology at University of Adelaide, Australia, and Director of the Robinson Research Institute. She was an NHMRC fellow for more than 15 years.

== Career and research interests ==
Robertson was ranked as one of South Australia's most influential women. Robertson’s career involves research on reproductive health, pregnancy, and immunology, with three main themes.

- Signalling of male seminal fluid within the female reproductive tract.
- Cytokine and leukocyte control, within conception and pregnancy
- Maternal immune regulation, with respect to the implantation of embryos, placental development and outcomes of reproduction.

Robertson's work has described a process whereby if male sperm is not of sufficient quality, the female will not invest her reproductive processes in that particular sperm. This may reflect the evolutionary biology of pregnancy, and processes where the female body decides if the body is ready for pregnancy. Her work has included reproductive health and preparing for successful pregnancies by 3–6 months by not using birth control to prepare for healthier babies.

== Early career ==
Robertson's career is notable for starting her early life a young parent, and then continuing on to win multiple prizes, and then become a fellow of two of Australia academies. Robertson was also the first RD Wright Fellow to have not had overseas lab experience. Her overseas experience was obtained via visiting fellowships, and making overseas contacts and collaborations through conferences and workshops.

== Selected publications ==
As at August 2019, Robertson had an H-Index of 66 and over 13,000 citations.

- Robertson SA, Chin PY, Glynn DJ, Thompson JG (2011) Peri-conceptual cytokines—setting the trajectory for embryo implantation, pregnancy and beyond. American Journal of Reproductive Immunology 66 Suppl 1:2-10.
- Robertston, SA, (2005) Seminal plasma and male factor signalling in the female reproductive tract (2005). Cell and Tissue Research. 322:(2)43-52
- Bromfield, J., Schjenken, JE., Chin, PY,. Care, AS. Jasper, MJ. SA Robertson Maternal tract factors contribute to paternal seminal fluid impact on metabolic phenotype in offspring (2014) Cell and tissue research 322 (1), 43-52.
- JJ Bromfield, JE Schjenken, PY Chin, AS Care, MJ Jasper, SA Robertson Proceedings of the National Academy of Sciences 111 (6), 2200-2205.

== Awards, honours and recognition ==
- Young Tall Poppy Science Award of the Australian Institute of Policy and Science (2000).
- J Christian Herr Award of the American Society for Reproductive Immunology for Excellence in Reproductive Immunology Research (2005).
- Fellow of the Society for Reproductive Biology (2011-)
- Senior Investigator Award of the European Society for Reproductive Immunology (2013).
- Elected Fellow, Australian Academy of Health and Medical Science (2015).
- Louis Waller Lecturer, Victorian Assisted Reproduction Treatment Authority (2015).
- Elected Fellow, Australian Academy of Science (2016).
- Appointed Officer of the Order of Australia for "distinguished service to medical research, particularly reproductive biology and immunology, and to professional societies".
