= Deaths in August 1980 =

The following is a list of notable deaths in August 1980.

Entries for each day are listed alphabetically by surname. A typical entry lists information in the following sequence:

- Name, age, country of citizenship at birth, subsequent country of citizenship (if applicable), reason for notability, cause of death (if known), and reference.

== August 1980 ==
=== 1 ===
- Editha Olga Bailey, 77, English-Australian philanthropist.
- Gardner Boultbee, 73, Canadian Olympic sailor (1932).
- Patrick Depailler, 35, French racing driver, racing crash.
- Bob Godwin, 69, American boxer.
- Guan Linzheng, 75, Chinese general.
- Daniel Hogan, 80–81, Irish politician, TD (1938–1943).
- M. V. Krishnappa, 62, Indian politician.
- Strother Martin, 61, American actor (Hawkins, Cool Hand Luke), heart attack.
- Frode Sørensen, 68, Danish Olympic cyclist (1932, 1936).
- Jacob Wallenberg, 87, Swedish banker and businessman.

=== 2 ===
- Fred Abel, 77, American football player.
- Guy Arkins, 91, Australian politician.
- Ramkinkar Baij, 74, Indian sculptor and painter.
- Gigi Ballista, 61, Italian actor.
- Page Belcher, 81, American politician, member of the U.S. House of Representatives (1951–1973).
- David Braden, 62, American football player.
- Hsu Shih, 60, Taiwanese composer, heart disease.
- Herbert Koschel, 58, German Olympic javelin thrower (1952, 1956).
- Peter O'Grady, 77, Irish hurler.
- Austin Prokop, 59, American Olympic fencer (1948).
- Verdun Scott, 64, New Zealand cricketer and rugby player.
- Serengdongrub, 86, Chinese politician.
- Cully Simon, 62, Canadian ice hockey player.
- Rudolf Soenning, 75, German Olympic bobsledder (1928).
- Leo Soileau, 76, American Cajun fiddler.
- Donald Ogden Stewart, 85, American writer and screenwriter, heart attack.
- Gene Weltfish, 77, American anthropologist.

=== 3 ===
- Arthur Greenup, 78, Australian politician and trade unionist, MP (1953–1955).
- Bill Hubbell, 83, American baseball player.
- Dionýz Ilkovič, 73, Czechoslovak physicist.
- Erich Schneider, 85, German general.

=== 4 ===
- Ioan Arhip, 90, Romanian general.
- Joseph Ashbrook, 62, American astronomer.
- Georg Aumann, 73, German mathematician.
- Willis D. Crittenberger, 89, American general.
- Vicente de la Mata, 62, Argentine football player and manager.
- Dorice Fordred, 77, South African-English actress.
- Pietro Genovesi, 78, Italian football player and manager.
- Mario Gutiérrez, 62, Bolivian politician.
- Lefty Jamerson, 80, American baseball player.
- Irving P. Mehigan, 82, American politician, member of the Wisconsin Senate (1925–1935), cancer.
- Duke Pearson, 47, American jazz musician, multiple sclerosis.
- Pekka Pöyry, 40, Finnish jazz and rock musician, suicide.
- Édouard Ramonet, 71, French politician.
- H. P. Ruffell Smith, 69, British pilot and physician.

=== 5 ===
- Arturo Carvajal Acuña, 71, Chilean politician.
- Norman Fulton, 71, English composer.
- Joachim Hämmerling, 79, German-born Danish biologist.
- Rosa Lee Ingram, 78, American sharecropper and civil rights case subject.
- Geoffrey Hugo Lampe, 67, British theologian.
- William Perrett Mead, 90, New Zealand engineer and writer.
- José María Puig, 76, Spanish Olympic water polo player (1924, 1928).
- Vladimir Razuvayev, 80, Soviet diplomat.
- Harold L. Runnels, 56, American politician, member of the U.S. House of Representatives (since 1971), respiratory failure.
- Carlo Tamberlani, 81, Italian actor.
- Warren A. Taylor, 89, American politician, member of the Alaska House of Representatives (1959–1967)
- Ella Winter, 82, Australian-British journalist and activist, stroke.

=== 6 ===
- Aino Bach, 78, Estonian artist.
- Leslie Hilton Brown, 62, British agriculturalist and ornithologist.
- Rodolfo Crespi, 58–59, Argentine actor.
- Marino Marini, 79, Italian sculptor.
- Nikolaus Müller, 88, German politician.
- Bronté Woodard, 39, American screenwriter (Grease, Can't Stop the Music), liver failure.

=== 7 ===
- Clare Annesley, 87, British peace activist and politician.
- Albert Bittner, 79, German conductor.
- Henry Everard, 83, British-Rhodesian politician, acting president (1975–1976, 1978, 1979).
- Kathleen Fidler, 80, English children's author.
- Hilde Goldschmidt, 82, German painter.
- John Graham Hearn, 50, British Olympic speed skater (1952, 1956).
- Lan Rongyu, 65, Chinese politician and general.
- Harold Loukes, 68, British academic administrator.

=== 8 ===
- Mirta Aguirre, 67, Cuban poet and novelist.
- Arman, 59, Iranian actor.
- Ivan Buresh, 94, Bulgarian biologist.
- Romano Caneva, 75, Italian Olympic boxer (1928).
- Chua Jim Neo, 73, Singaporean chef and cookbook writer.
- Allan Collamore, 93, American baseball player.
- Henry Henderson, 75, American baseball player.
- Kim Hong-il, 81, South Korean diplomat, politician and general.
- Simon Lack, 66, Scottish actor.
- David Mercer, 52, English playwright and screenwriter, heart attack.
- François Moreels, 76, Belgian racing cyclist.
- Anna Piasecka, 98, Polish politician and educator.
- Paula Rueß, 78, German political activist.
- Paul Triquet, 70, Canadian general.
- Erzsébet Metzker Vass, 65, Hungarian politician.
- Laska Winter, 74, American actress.

=== 9 ===
- Nazeer Abbasi, 27, Pakistani politician, torture murder.
- Harry Bell, 83, Australian footballer.
- Blackbear Bosin, 59, American artist, heart failure.
- Jacqueline Cochran, 74, American pilot and business executive, first woman to exceed the speed of sound.
- George Dahm, 64, American Olympic rower (1936).
- Saraswati Devi, 67–68, Indian music director and composer.
- Denis Glover, 67, New Zealand poet, bronchopneumonia.
- Ruby Hurley, 70, American civil rights activist.
- Audrey Jeans, 51, English singer and comedian, traffic collision.
- Mel Kerr, 77, Canadian-born American baseball player.
- Philip Lee, 75, Australian cricketer.
- Sam Mark, 83, American soccer executive.
- J. K. Mehta, 78, Indian philosopher and economist.
- Elliott Nugent, 83, American actor, playwright and film director.
- Cor van Nus, 75, Dutch footballer.
- Horace Waring, 69, English-Australian zoologist.

=== 10 ===
- Gareth Evans, 34, British philosopher, cancer.
- Peter Fick, 66, American Olympic swimmer (1936).
- Yahya Khan, 63, Pakistani general and politician, president (1969–1971), stroke.
- Freddy Koch, 64, Danish actor.
- Isac Peltz, 81, Romanian writer and journalist.
- William J. Sebald, 78, American diplomat, emphysema.

=== 11 ===
- Joan Coggin, 82, British novelist.
- Willi Forst, 77, Austrian actor, singer and filmmaker.
- Sir Mostyn Hanger, 72, Australian jurist.
- Verner Emil Hoggatt Jr., 59, American mathematician.
- José Lascar, 62, Chilean politician.
- Erika Leuchtag, 71, German physiotherapist.
- Erna Pomerantseva, 81, Soviet folklorist.
- Paul Robert, 69, French lexicographer.
- Jacques Singer, 70, Polish-born American violinist and conductor, cancer.
- Edmund Stinnes, 84, German-born American industrialist.
- Vimy, 27–28, French Thoroughbred racehorse.
- Mikhail Vodopyanov, 80, Soviet pilot and general.
- Ranny Williams, 67, Panamanian-born Jamaican comedian and actor.
- Billy Wrigglesworth, 67, English footballer.

=== 12 ===
- Siegfried Borries, 68, German violinist.
- Birthe Bovin, 74, Danish painter.
- Vojo Dimitrijević, 70, Yugoslav painter.
- Clement Eaton, 82, American historian.
- Billy Hartill, 75, English footballer.
- F. S. Platou, 76, Norwegian architect.
- Whitey Rawl, 75, American football player and coach.
- Jan Frederik Schouten, 70, Dutch physicist.
- Leopold Spinner, 74, Austrian-born British composer.
- Masaaki Tachihara, 54, Japanese novelist, esophageal cancer.
- Manuel Tato, 73, Argentine Roman Catholic prelate.
- Luis Uribe Barra, 83, Chilean politician and physician.
- Jan Wessel, 76, Norwegian radio engineer.
- Witold Zawadowski, 92, Polish radiologist.

=== 13 ===
- Otto Mønsted Acthon, 62, Danish Olympic equestrian (1948, 1952).
- Purushottam Bhaskar Bhave, 70, Indian writer.
- Bogislaw von Bonin, 72, German soldier and journalist.
- Eqrem Çabej, 72, Albanian linguist.
- James Duggan, 76, Canadian politician.
- George Haslam, 82, English footballer.
- Leonas Juozapaitis, 79, Lithuanian footballer.
- Tom Miller, 83, American baseball player.
- Ya'akov Mizrahi, 60–61, Israeli politician, MK (1972–1974), heart attack.
- Kolbjørn Varmann, 75, Norwegian politician.
- Bill Whittaker, 96, New Zealand lawn bowler.

=== 14 ===
- Ronald Brooks, 81, English cricketer.
- Diego Fabbri, 69, Italian playwright.
- Raymond Hakim, 70, Egyptian-born French film producer.
- Chick Hannan, 79, American actor and rodeo performer.
- John Lord, 70, Australian footballer.
- Henri Marquet, 72, French screenwriter.
- Cyril Gordon Martin, 88, English soldier.
- Paul Snider, 29, Canadian nightclub owner, suicide by gunshot.
- Dorothy Stratten, 20, Canadian model (Playboy) and actress, shot.
- Robert S. Travis, 71, American politician.
- Earle Cathers Westwood, 70, Canadian politician.
- Zezinho, 50, Brazilian footballer.
- Marion Zinderstein, 84, American tennis player.

=== 15 ===
- Giovanni Astegiano, 39, Italian Olympic biathlete (1972), avalanche.
- Gilles Bellemare, 47, Canadian politician.
- Hans Berg, 78, Norwegian politician.
- Aage Bertelsen, 78, Danish humanitarian.
- Alice Willson Broughton, 91, American civic leader, first lady of North Carolina (1941–1945), heart attack.
- Glenn B. Hamm, 44, American artist, amyotrophic lateral sclerosis.
- Murray Linton, 76, New Zealand politician.
- José Antonio Mayobre, 66, Venezuelan economist.
- Saeed Mehdiyoun, 52, Iranian fighter pilot, participant in the Nojeh coup plot, execution by hanging.
- Sigrun Otto, 84, Norwegian actress.
- Ronald Park, 85, New Zealand soldier.
- Imru Haile Selassie, 87, Ethiopian politician, nobleman and diplomat.
- William Hood Simpson, 92, American general.
- Beverly M. Vincent, 90, American politician, member of the U.S. House of Representatives (1937–1945).
- Alan Welch, 69, Australian footballer.

=== 16 ===
- Justicia Acuña, 87, Chilean civil engineer.
- Kevin Blackwell, 24, New Zealand racing cyclist.
- James Dallas Egbert III, 17, American former missing persons case, suicide by gunshot.
- Antonio Fayenz, 80, Italian footballer.
- Thomas Kiely Gorman, 87, American Roman Catholic prelate.
- John Greenwood, 11, English unsolved murder victim, bludgeoned.
- Robert Kirsch, 57, American literary critic, cancer.
- James B. Longley, 56, American politician, governor of Maine (1975–1979), cancer.
- Gary Miller, 11, English unsolved murder victim, bludgeoned.
- Mick O'Connor, 77, Australian rugby player.

=== 17 ===
- Harold Adamson, 73, American lyricist ("Time on My Hands").
- Gwen Bristow, 76, American writer and journalist, lung cancer.
- Azaria Chamberlain, 9 weeks, Australian child, dingo attack.
- Jonah Goldman, 73, American baseball player.
- William Jaffé, 82, American economic historian.
- William Keeton, 47, American zoologist, heart failure.
- Jakob Klaesi, 97, Swiss psychiatrist.
- Kodavatiganti Kutumbarao, 70, Indian writer.
- William Linvill, 61, American electrical engineer.
- Ethel Bergstresser McCoy, 87, American philatelist.
- Thomas Nevill, 78, English Anglican priest and academic administrator.
- Albert Scheflen, 59, American psychiatrist.

=== 18 ===
- Fred Beaver, 69, American painter.
- Debabrata Biswas, 68, Indian singer.
- Norman Cazden, 65, American composer.
- Harold Kitching, 94, British Olympic rower (1908) and police officer.
- Artūrs Motmillers, 79, Latvian Olympic runner (1924, 1928, 1936).
- Elizabeth Stern, 64, Canadian-born American pathologist, stomach cancer.

=== 19 ===
- Carman Barnes, 67, American novelist.
- Otto Frank, 91, German businessman and publisher (The Diary of a Young Girl), lung cancer.
- Harcourt Godfrey, 75, New Zealand wrestler.
- Hans Offerdal, 70, Norwegian politician.
- Noémi Raymond, 91, French-born American artist.
- Eric Underwood, 74, Australian scientist and agriculturalist.

=== 20 ===
- Aghakhan Aghabeyli, 75, Azerbaijani geneticist and agriculturalist.
- Astaman, 80, Indonesian actor, stroke.
- Celestina Bottego, 84, American-born Italian nun and missionary.
- Naemi Briese, 72, Swedish actress.
- Richard Creagh-Osborne, 52, English Olympic sailor (1956).
- Joe Dassin, 41, American singer and songwriter ("L'Été indien"), heart attack.
- Wolfgang Gröbner, 81, Austrian mathematician.
- Al Hermann, 81, American baseball player and politician.
- A. K. Hamilton Jenkin, 79, English historian and writer.
- Yuri Lavrov, 75, Soviet actor.
- Lum Loy, 96, Chinese-Australian businesswoman.
- Bernardo Santareno, 59, Portuguese writer.
- Dame Lucy Sutherland, 77, Australian-born British historian and academic administrator.
- Perc Tucker, 60, Australian politician.
- Agathe Turgis, 88, French Olympic fencer (1936).

=== 21 ===
- James d'Orma Braman, 78, American politician, mayor of Seattle (1964–1969).
- Jack Cheetham, 60, South African cricketer.
- Afonso de Castro, 68, Brazilian Olympic rower (1936).
- Carl Dentzel, 67, American historian and preservationist.
- Kazys Markevičius, 75, Lithuanian Olympic boxer (1928).
- Alfred Neubauer, 89, Austrian-German racing manager.
- Jennifer Nicks, 48, British Olympic pair skater (1952), heart attack.
- Zenon Nowak, 75, Polish politician.
- Walter E. Sachs, 96, American banker and financier (Goldman Sachs).
- Norman Shelley, 77, British actor.

=== 22 ===
- L. C. Bates, 76, American civil rights activist and publisher.
- Cyril Beach, 71, English footballer.
- Tsolak Bekaryan, 57, Soviet Armenian violinist and composer.
- Charlie Fletcher, 74, English footballer.
- Gabriel González Videla, 81, Chilean politician, president (1946–1952), cardiac arrest.
- James Smith McDonnell, 81, American aviator and businessman (McDonnell Aircraft Corporation), stroke.
- Cosmé McMoon, 79, Mexican-born American pianist and composer, pancreatic cancer.
- DeWitt Carter Reddick, 76, American journalist and academic administrator.
- Clive Rush, 49, American football player and coach, heart attack.
- Kishore Sahu, 64, Indian actor and filmmaker.
- George R. Stewart, 85, American novelist, historian and toponymist.
- Ruth Stout, 96, American author and gardener.
- Columbus Vance, 75, American baseball player.

=== 23 ===
- Antonio Cassi Ramelli, 75, Italian architect.
- Gerhard Hanappi, 51, Austrian footballer, cancer.
- Toshichi Iwata, 87, Japanese glass artist.
- Rudolf Kochendörffer, 68, German mathematician.
- Hugh Morton, 77, Scottish footballer.
- Wim Steijn, 66, Dutch painter.

=== 24 ===
- Idrus Nasir Djajadiningrat, 60, Indonesian diplomat and naval admiral.
- Herman Fink, 69, American baseball player.
- D. Logan Giffin, 90, American politician and lawyer.
- Frederick Maurice Watson Harvey, 91, Irish-born Canadian soldier and rugby player.
- Yootha Joyce, 53, British actress (Man About the House, George and Mildred), liver failure.
- Arthur T. Mason, 77, American general.
- André Parrot, 79, French archaeologist.
- Roy Pascal, 76, English literary scholar.
- Louise Porter, 62, American politician, member of the Kansas Senate (1965–1970), heart attack.
- Gerard Shelley, 88–89, British linguist and Roman Catholic prelate.

=== 25 ===
- Santos P. Amadeo, 78, Puerto Rican politician.
- Bill Brown, 101, British Olympic racewalker (1908).
- Gower Champion, 61, American actor, dancer and theatre director, Waldenström macroglobulinemia.
- Lester Dorr, 87, American actor.
- Henry Fewin, 84, Australian rugby player.
- Joseph Godber, 66, British politician, MP (1951–1979).
- Ali-Asghar Hekmat, 88, Iranian diplomat, politician and writer.
- Claude B. Hutchison, 95, American botanist and politician.
- Li Minghao, 82, Chinese politician, lung cancer.
- José Medina, 87, Brazilian filmmaker.
- Herbert Panse, 66, German footballer.
- Robert Campbell Reeve, 78, American pilot and politician.
- Maud Reuterswärd, 60, Swedish author and radio presenter.
- Dumitru D. Roșca, 85, Romanian philosopher.
- C. Gus Rys, 68, American politician, member of the New Jersey General Assembly (1972–1978).
- Aurel Toma, 69, Romanian boxer.

=== 26 ===
- Rosa Albach-Retty, 105, Austrian actress.
- Tex Avery, 72, American animator and voice actor (Looney Tunes), co-creator of Bugs Bunny and Daffy Duck, oesophagogastric junctional adenocarcinoma.
- Howard F. Bremer, 81–82, American historian.
- Jimmy Forrest, 60, American jazz musician, heart disease.
- Dick H. Guinn, 62, American naval admiral, cardiac arrest.
- Albert Heux, 88, French racing cyclist.
- Rudolf Inzinger, 73, Austrian mathematician.
- Miliza Korjus, 71, Polish-American opera singer, heart attack.
- Knox Manning, 76, American actor.
- Lucy Morton, 82, English Olympic swimmer (1924).
- George William Symes, 84, British general.
- Barney Traynor, 85, American football player and coach.
- Arthur Weiss, 68, American screenwriter.

=== 27 ===
- Ehud Avriel, 62, Austrian-Israeli diplomat and politician, MK (1955–1957), heart attack.
- Herman Beam, 50, American racing driver.
- James A. Byrne, 74, American politician, member of the U.S. House of Representatives (1953–1973).
- Peter Folger, 74, American businessman (Folgers) and socialite, prostate cancer.
- Carl von Haartman, 83, Finnish actor and director.
- Douglas Kenney, 33, American magazine editor (National Lampoon) and film writer (Animal House, Caddyshack), fall.
- Hugh Lambie, 75, New Zealand politician.
- Sam Levenson, 68, American humorist, journalist and television host, heart attack.
- André Marchal, 86, French organist.
- T. P. Meenakshisundaram, 79, Indian writer and academic administrator.
- Grover Sellers, 87, American politician, Texas attorney general (1943–1946).
- Arabella Scott, 94, Scottish teacher and suffragette.
- John Wilson, 77, American baseball player.

=== 28 ===
- Konniyoor Meenakshi Amma, 79, Indian writer and educator.
- Austin Letheridge Bender, 64, American politician, heart failure.
- A. P. Jayasuriya, 78, Sri Lankan politician, MP (1947–1952).
- Gheorghe Manoliu, 92, Romanian general.
- Klaus Serck-Hanssen, 94, Norwegian engineer and mining executive.
- Harry Smythe, 75, American baseball player.
- Rampie Stander, 35, South African rugby player, stroke.
- Boris Tishin, 51, Soviet Olympic boxer (1952).
- Beno Zupančič, 55, Slovene writer and journalist.

=== 29 ===
- Franco Basaglia, 56, Italian psychiatrist and disability advocate.
- Guy Bond, 76, American educational psychologist.
- Carl Wilhelm Correns, 87, German minerologist.
- Louis Darquier de Pellepoix, 82, French politician and Nazi collaborator.
- Billy Furness, 71, English footballer.
- Anthony Giordano, 66, American mobster (St. Louis crime family).
- Lewis Joslyn, 72, American politician and lawyer.
- Ray Wittelsberger, 55, American Olympic hockey player (1956).

=== 30 ===
- Big Brown, 59, American poet and recording artist, murdered.
- Wanda Capodaglio, 91, Italian actress.
- Franco Enriquez, 52, Italian theatre and television director, liver disease.
- Ryszard Fandier, 39, Polish Olympic sports shooter (1968).
- Joseph T. Higgins, 89, American politician and lawyer.
- Helena Lewyn, 90, American pianist and composer.
- Jimmy Van Dyke, 81, American football player.

=== 31 ===
- Rodolfo Arena, 69, Brazilian actor.
- Alexander Bogolepov, 94, Russian-American theologian.
- Dahmane El Harrachi, 54, Algerian singer, traffic collision.
- Clifton Firth, 76, New Zealand graphic designer and photographer.
- Tom Godwin, 65, American science fiction author.
- Merle Hollis, 65, New Zealand cricketer.
- Arthur Sard, 71, American mathematician.
- Bud Sherrod, 52, American football player.
- Jan Ślusarczyk, 76, Polish sculptor.
- Juan Felipe Toruño, 82, Nicaraguan writer.
