= Vaghinak =

Vaghinak (in Armenian Վաղինակ) or in Western Armenian Vaghinag is a given name. It may refer to:

- Shahnour Vaghinag Aznavourian (1924–2018), birth name of French Armenian singer songwriter Charles Aznavour
- Vaghinag Bekaryan (1891-1975), Armenian pedagogue, poet, and writer
- Vaghinak Galstyan (born 1973), Armenian Greco-Roman wrestler
