= Süruri =

Azerbaijani poet

Süruri (Azerbaijani: Süruri )(15th century, Aq Qoyunlu state) was an Azerbaijani poet who lived in the late 15th and early 16th centuries.

== Biography ==
He lived in the late 15th and early 16th centuries. He continued the Nasimi literary school. His poems promoting letters were very popular. Especially after Shah Ismail Khatai came to power (1502–1524) he was able to express his views more freely. After Sultan Selim's armies captured the city of Tabriz in 1515, Süruri was sent to Turkey along with a number of scientists and artists. Here, too, he gained great fame as a poet.

Although Süruri's work consisted mainly of works dedicated to the alphabet, it is found in his ghazals written on the theme of love. In 2013, copies of some Azerbaijani manuscripts were brought to Baku from the Vatican by Farid Alakbarli and handed over to the Institute of Manuscripts. Süruri's Divan is one of the most valuable sources available. His "Divan" has not been studied and published yet. Pasha Karimov, deputy director for Scientific Affairs of the Institute of Manuscripts of ANAS, found Suleymaniye and Manisa copies of Süruri divan and brought them to Azerbaijan. According to Karimov, the poems in the copies are close to Nasimi's language: "Süruri was a poet who continued Nasimi's traditions and worshiped Fazlullah Naimi at the level of God. "Süruri's divan kept in the Suleymaniye Library in Istanbul has been copied on 26 pages and consists of 667 verses." It includes 90 ghazals and 3 jams. The Manisa copy is a collection, which includes Süruri's poems in Azerbaijani Turkish, as well as Persian poems by Nasimi and Nur Seyid Ali. The manuscript even contains a scribe's note. B. in the city of Aleppo Ayram was transferred to a sheikh named Baba by a secretary named Dervish Mustafa. Copies and distributors of this manuscript are also letters. A number of poems that we do not find in other copies of the Süruri divan in this manuscript, including jam dedicated to Shah Ismail Khatai, are of great interest."

Karimov also noted that work is underway on the available version of the Divan. On the basis of manuscript materials obtained from Turkish and Vatican libraries, the works of the Azerbaijani poet Süruri are being studied by Doctor of Philology Pasha Karimov and “Süruri. Divan ”is being prepared for publication.
