= Marie Landré =

Dutch musician

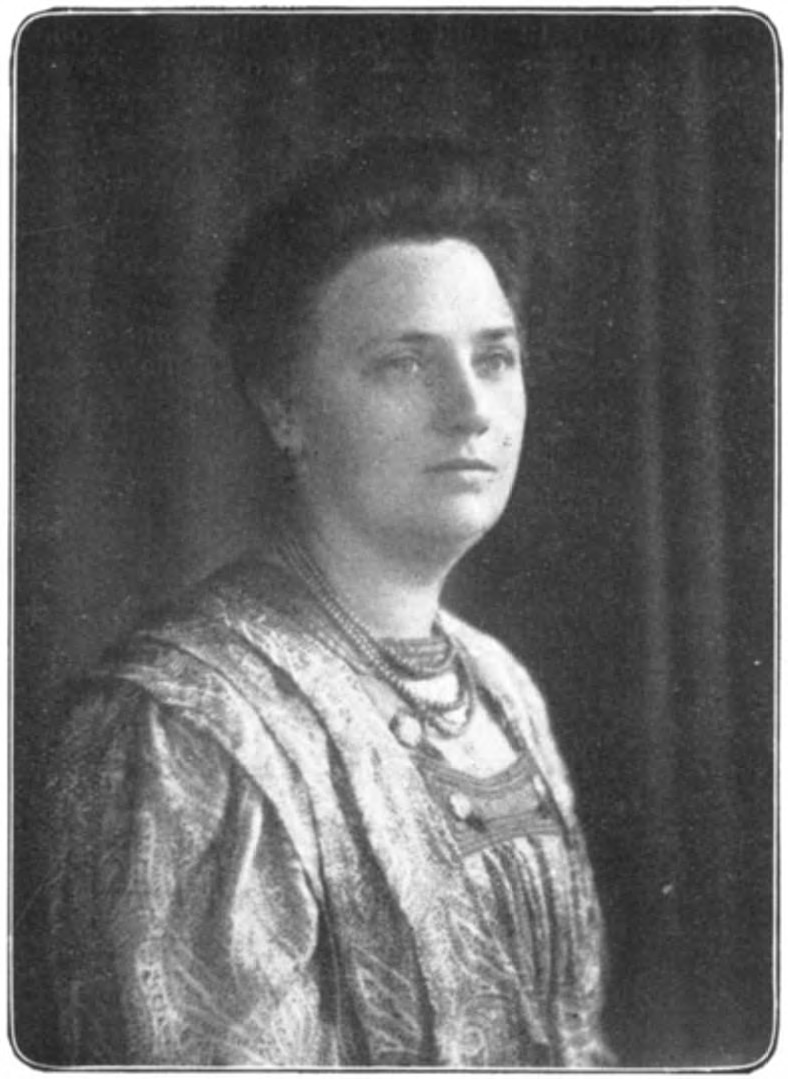
Marie Landré in Onze Musici (1911)

Marie Evrardine Landré (9 May 1877 – 6 May 1957) was a Dutch pianist and harpsichordist.

== Life ==
Landré was born in Amsterdam on 9 May 1877, the daughter of Jean Daniël Landré, a merchant, and Louiza Johanna Jacoba Francisca Koning. She herself remained unmarried.

She was trained by Henri Tibbe at the music school of the Maatschappij tot Bevordering der Toonkunst in Amsterdam. Julius Röntgen was her teacher at the Amsterdam Conservatory. She also studied for a time in Frankfurt am Main.

She arranged concert tours with Nella Gunning and Anna Tijssen-Bremerkamp and was active in Het Gooi with musicians such as Christiaan Freijer and Johan Schoonderbeek. She also accompanied Carl Flesch, Bram Eldering, Tilia Hill and Hendrik C. van Oort. She was also a piano teacher at the Bussum music school. She was involved with the Koninklijke Christelijke Oratorium Vereniging Amsterdam, helping with rehearsals of works by Felix Weingartner, Gabriel Pierné, Willem de Haan and Georg Henschel. Under the direction of Johan Wagenaar, she accompanied his cantata "De Shipbreuk". Through Schoonderbeek, she was one of the founding members of the Nederlandse Bachvereniging and was involved for many years in performances of Bach's St Matthew Passion.

She lived for a long time in Laren (Noord-Holland), where she died in 1957 in the Sint Jan Hospital and was buried in the Laren General Cemetery.
