= List of people from Springfield, Illinois =

Notable people from Springfield, IL

The following list includes notable people who were born or have lived in Springfield, Illinois. For a similar list organized alphabetically by last name, see the category page People from Springfield, Illinois.

== Arts and culture ==
- Adrian Belew, musician best known for solo career song "Oh Daddy" and work with King Crimson, Talking Heads, and Tom Tom Club; lived in Springfield during the 1980s
- Patricia Carey, an opera singer and Juilliard educated vocalist better known as the mother of Mariah Carey
- June Christy, cool jazz singer with The Stan Kenton Orchestra
- Morris Day, musician and actor best known for work with Morris Day and the Time and Purple Rain, born in Springfield
- Vachel Lindsay, poet, considered the father of modern singing poetry, wrote first book of film criticism, The Art of the Moving Picture, in 1915
- Theodore Lorch, early 20th-century actor, widely seen in Three Stooges shorts, born in Springfield
- Sarah Danielle Madison, actress in Training Day, Jurassic Park III, 90210, 7th Heaven, Judging Amy
- Jay Manuel, reality show host, America's Next Top Model
- Bobby McFerrin, musician best known for song "Don't Worry, Be Happy", attended Sangamon State University (now UIS) in 1975, son of opera baritone singer Bobby McFerrin Sr.
- Brendon Small, sitcom writer, producer, actor, and musician
- Louise Stanley, early 20th-century actress, born in Springfield
- Cecily Strong, cast member of Saturday Night Live, born in Springfield
- Jeff Stryker, actor, model, producer, director, adult film and stage performer
- Bobby Watson, early 20th-century actor, born in Springfield
- Russell Smith, film producer

== Business and institutional leadership ==
- Marsha J. Evans, CEO of American Red Cross and US Navy Admiral
- C. W. Post, businessman and founder of Postum Cereal Company
- Marjorie Merriweather Post, businesswoman, founder of General Foods Corporation, and leader in developing the frozen food market. One of her four marriages was to Edward Francis Hutton, founder of E.F. Hutton.
- Julius Rosenwald, President and Chairman of Sears, Roebuck and Co. and important philanthropist. Rosenwald was born in Springfield in 1862. He attended public schools and lived in Springfield until 1879. His philanthropy included establishing the Rosenwald Fund which was noted for donations to African American education and YMCAs. Rosenwald played a leading role in the creation of the Museum of Science and Industry.
- Damola Adamolekun, CEO of Red Lobster Investor Holdings and former CEO of P.F. Chang's. (Adamolekun spent part of his youth in Springfield before his family relocated to Columbia, Maryland, and it was referenced in a segment of a June 25, 2025 broadcast of The Breakfast Club.)

== Politics and law ==
- John Peter Altgeld, Governor of Illinois from 1893 to January 1897, best known for role in Haymarket Affair pardons, the Pullman Strike and 1896 Democratic National Convention
- Stanley P. V. Arnold, Illinois state representative and newspaper editor
- William W. Billson, Minnesota state senator and lawyer
- Nikki Budzinski, U.S. representative, former Chief of Staff to the Director of the Office of Management and Budget and Senior Adviser to JB Pritzker's exploratory committee
- Shelby M. Cullom, 17th Governor of Illinois
- Stephen Arnold Douglas, Register of Federal Land Office, Springfield, 1837–1840; Illinois Secretary of State, 1840–41, associate justice of Illinois Supreme Court, 1841–1843; U.S. Representative, 1843; U.S. Senator, 1847 until death June 3, 1861; Democratic Presidential Candidate, 1860
- Dick Durbin (born 1944), U.S. Senator from Illinois (1997–present)
- John Porter East (1931–1986), U.S. senator from North Carolina (1981–1986)
- D. Logan Giffin (1890–1980). Illinois state legislator and lawyer.
- Ulysses S. Grant (1822–1885), 18th President of the United States of America, stationed in Springfield at the outbreak of the American Civil War
- John Hay, statesman, diplomat, author, journalist, and private secretary and assistant to Abraham Lincoln, grandfather of Ambassador John Hay Whitney
- William H. Herndon, law partner and biographer of Abraham Lincoln
- William Brown Ide (1796–1852), Vermont State Legislator, central figure in California's Bear Flag Revolt of 1846, named President of the Republic of California
- William Jayne, first governor of the Dakota Territory, personal friend of Abraham Lincoln
- Otto Kerner, Jr., Governor of Illinois (1961 to 1968). Son-in-law of Anton Cermak, Kerner led the National Advisory Commission on Civil Disorders, the Kerner Commission. He was convicted of corruption.
- John L. Lewis, president of the United Mine Workers of America (1920 to 1960)
- Abraham Lincoln, 16th President of the United States of America
- Mary Todd Lincoln, First Lady of the United States, wife of Abraham Lincoln, died in Springfield in 1882
- Robert Todd Lincoln, U.S. Secretary of War and son of Abraham Lincoln, born in Springfield
- David T. Littler, Illinois state legislator and lawyer
- Tracey Meares, Walton Hale Hamilton Professor of Law at Yale Law School and was appointed by President Barack Obama to the President's Task Force on 21st Century Policing
- Dana Perino, White House Press Secretary for the George W. Bush administration, reporter for WCIA and earned MA in Public Affairs Reporting from the University of Illinois Springfield (UIS)
- Frank P. Sadler, Illinois state senator and lawyer, born in Springfield
- Paul Simon, U.S. Senator and Presidential candidate, served in the Illinois State legislature from 1955 to 1968, served as Illinois Lt. Governor from 1969 to 1973, taught at Sangamon State University (now UIS) from 1973 to 1975 Father of Illinois Lt. Governor Sheila Simon.
- Adlai Stevenson, 31st Governor of Illinois, Democratic Party's nominee for president in 1952 and 1956
- Sharon Tyndale, Illinois Secretary of State
- Brand Whitlock, journalist, mayor of Toledo, Ohio, ambassador to Belgium, and author. Lived in Springfield from 1892 to January 1897 while serving as reporter for Chicago Herald and then working for Secretary of State during Gov. Altgeld's administration.

== Religion ==
- The Rt. Reverend Albert Arthur Chambers, seventh Bishop of Springfield
- Kevin Vann, bishop of the Roman Catholic Diocese of Orange

== Academics ==
- Nan Dieter-Conklin, radio astronomer
- Robert Fitzgerald, Harvard poetry professor
- William H. Luers, diplomat, Metropolitan Museum of Art president, Columbia University professor
- Seth Barnes Nicholson, astronomer
- Susan Nolen-Hoeksema, Yale psychology professor
- Raymond E. Zirkle (1902-1988), radiation chemist, a member of the Manhattan Project

== Sports ==
=== Baseball ===
- Sam Antonacci, outfielder for the Chicago White Sox, played for Team Italy in the 2026 World Baseball Classic
- Al Barlick, Hall of Fame baseball umpire
- Ed Barrow, was an American manager and front office executive in Major League Baseball. He served as business manager (de facto general manager) of the New York Yankees from 1921 to 1939 and as team president from 1939 to 1945, and is credited with building the Yankee dynasty. Barrow was elected to the Baseball Hall of Fame in 1953.
- Don Erickson, pitcher for the Philadelphia Phillies
- Roger Erickson, pitcher for the New York Yankees and Minnesota Twins
- Jeff Fassero, pitcher for nine MLB teams (1991–2006)
- Tyler Fitzgerald, shortstop for the San Francisco Giants; born in Springfield
- Rose Folder, pitcher in the All-American Girls Professional Baseball League
- Tim Hulett, third baseman for the Chicago White Sox, Baltimore Orioles, and St. Louis Cardinals; born in Springfield
- Tug Hulett, second baseman for the Seattle Mariners, Kansas City Royals, and Philadelphia Phillies; son of Tim Hulett; born in Springfield
- Bob Kinsella, outfielder for the New York Giants
- Justin Knoedler, catcher for the San Francisco Giants
- Ryan O'Malley, pitcher for the Chicago Cubs
- Robin Roberts, pitcher and member of the Baseball Hall of Fame
- Billy Rogell, shortstop for the Boston Red Sox, Detroit Tigers and Chicago Cubs
- Johnny Schaive, infielder for the Washington Senators
- Dick Schofield, shortstop for the California Angels, New York Mets, Toronto Blue Jays and Los Angeles Dodgers; son of Ducky Schofield
- Ducky Schofield, infielder for nine MLB teams
- Kevin Seitzer, former third baseman for the Kansas City Royals, Milwaukee Brewers, Oakland Athletics, and Cleveland Indians; hitting coach for the Atlanta Braves from 2015 thru 2024.The hitting coach with Seattle Mariners since 2025.
- Allan Simpson, pitcher for the Cincinnati Reds, Colorado Rockies and Milwaukee Brewers
- Art Sunday, outfielder for the Brooklyn Ward's Wonders
- Lou Sylvester, outfielder for the Cincinnati Outlaw Reds, Cincinnati Red Stockings, Louisville Colonels and St. Louis Browns
- Betty Wanless, infielder for the Grand Rapids Chicks and South Bend Blue Sox (AAGPBL)
- Eric Weaver, pitcher for the Los Angeles Dodgers, Seattle Mariners and Anaheim Angels
- Jayson Werth, outfielder for the Toronto Blue Jays, Los Angeles Dodgers, Philadelphia Phillies and Washington Nationals
- Helen Westerman, catcher for the Kenosha Comets (AAGPBL)
- Roy Wise, pitcher for the Pittsburgh Pirates
- Brad Ziegler, pitcher for the Miami Marlins

=== Basketball ===
- Kevin Gamble, shooting guard and small forward for Boston Celtics and Sacramento Kings.
- Andre Iguodala, four-time NBA champion player for Golden State Warriors, MVP of 2015 NBA Finals
- Alex Harden, guard in the WNBA and EuroBasket player for Israel
- Dave Robisch, forward/center in the ABA and NBA

=== Football ===
- Nick Broeker, offensive guard for Houston Texans
- Peter Christofilakos, kicker and soccer player
- John Kidd, NFL punter 1984-98
- Albert Okwuegbunam, tight end for Denver Broncos
- Ray Ramsey, aka "Rocket" Ramsey, defensive back for Chicago Cardinals (1950–1953); also had a brief professional basketball career
- Joey Sternaman, quarterback for Illinois and 1920s pro football teams including Chicago Bears
- Otto Stowe, wide receiver for Miami Dolphins 1972
- Bob Trumpy, tight end for Cincinnati Bengals (1968–1977)
- Malik Turner, wide receiver for Dallas Cowboys

=== Mixed Martial Arts ===
- Matt Mitrione, professional mixed martial artist formerly competing in the UFC, and now competes in Bellator was born and grew up in Springfield

=== Motorsports ===
- Tim Wilkerson, NHRA funny car driver
- Justin Allgaier, NASCAR Xfinity Series Champion

=== Tennis ===
- George Lott, five-time U.S. Open doubles champion, member of International Tennis Hall of Fame; born in Springfield

=== U.S. Olympic medal winners ===
- Dick Boushka, Gold Medal, Basketball, 1956
- Kelci Bryant, Silver Medal, Diving, 2012
- Steve Christoff, Gold Medal, Hockey, 1980, Miracle on Ice at Lake Placid
- Sarah Glaser, Silver Medal, Sailing, 2000
- Gracie Gold, Bronze Medal, Figure Skating, 2014
- Ryan Held, Gold Medal, Men's 4×100-meter freestyle relay team, 2016 and 2024
- Will Simpson, Gold Medal, Equestrian, 2008

== Writers ==
- James Hollis, Jungian analyst, writer and public speaker
