= Hiraji Cursetji =

Military Surgeon in British Indian Army

Sir Hiraji Jehangir Manekji Cursetji
- Born: 14 August 1885
- Died: 26 July 1964 (aged 78)
- Military career
- Allegiance: United Kingdom
- Branch: British Indian Army
- Service years: 1912-1946
- Rank: Major-General
- Conflicts: World War I; Mesopotamian Campaign; World War II
- Awards: Knight Commander of the Order of the Indian Empire; Companion of the Order of the Star of India; Distinguished Service Order

Major-General Sir Hiraji Jehangir Manekji Cursetji, KCIE, CSI, DSO (14 August 1885 – 26 July 1964) was an Indian military surgeon and general in the British Indian Army during the Second World War.

== Biography ==
Born in Mumbai (then Bombay), to a prominent Parsi family, Cursetji initially aspired to a cavalry commission in the British Indian Army due to his fondness for riding, but ultimately opted for the Indian Medical Service. He studied at Gonville and Caius Colleges at Cambridge University and at London Hospital before entering the Indian Medical Service as a lieutenant on 27 January 1912.

=== World War I ===
During the First World War, he served in Egypt, Gallipoli and Mesopotamia. He was promoted to captain on 27 January 1915. In October 1916, he was appointed a Knight of the Order of the White Eagle of Serbia (5th Class, with swords).

As a medical officer attached to the 14th King George's Own Ferozepore Sikhs during the Mesopotamian campaign, Captain Cursetji was awarded the Distinguished Service Order on 26 May 1919 for his service at the battles of Mushaq (26–27 October 1918) and Sharqat (29 October 1918):

For conspicuous gallantry and devotion to duty at Mushaq, 26th-27th October and at Sharquat, 29th October. Throughout the operations he displayed the greatest zeal and disregard for danger while tending the wounded under heavy fire, working unceasingly for forty-eight hours. He has previously rendered excellent service, and once was severely wounded.

=== Inter-war service ===
Cursetji was promoted to major in the IMS on 27 January 1924, and was brevetted to the rank of lieutenant-colonel in the Indian Army on 1 January 1931. On 8 January of that year, he was appointed a deputy assistant director of medical services, and was promoted to the substantive rank of lieutenant-colonel on 27 July. In 1938, he was appointed as the Officer-in-Charge of Hospitals, Lucknow District. He was promoted to colonel on 1 December 1938 (with seniority from 1 January 1934).

=== World War II ===
On 23 February 1941, Cursetji was appointed an Honorary Surgeon to the King (KHS). On 12 July, he was promoted to major-general, the first Indian to achieve a substantive general officer rank in the British Indian Army. During the Second World War, the IMS was integrated with the Indian Army Medical Corps. In September, Cursetji was appointed as Deputy Director of Medical Services, Northern Command, and transferred to the North-Western Army in the same role in April 1942. He was appointed a Companion of the Order of the Star of India (CSI) in the 1943 New Year Honours list.

=== Post-war service ===
Cursetji was knighted as a Knight Commander of the Order of the Indian Empire (KCIE) in the 1946 New Year Honours list.

=== Post-retirement ===
He retired on 1 June 1946, and settled in England. He was looked after by his niece Sherene Rustomjee in his later years, until his death in an automobile accident on 26 July 1964. His estate was assessed for probate on 23 October, with a valuation of £10,641 (equivalent to £188,445 in 2025).

== Awards and decorations ==
Ribbon bar (as it would look today):

Knight Commander of the Order of the Indian Empire (KCIE)	1946
Companion of the Order of the Star of India (CSI)	1943
Companion of the Distinguished Service Order (DSO)	1919
1914–15 Star	1918
British War Medal	1918
Victory Medal (United Kingdom)	1918; with bronze oak leaf for MID
General Service Medal (1918)	with clasp for "Iraq"
India General Service Medal (1909)	with clasp for "Waziristan 1921-1924"
War Medal 1939–1945	
India Service Medal	
King George V Silver Jubilee Medal	
King George VI Coronation Medal	
Knight of the Order of the White Eagle	1916; with Swords
