= Vera Barstow =

American violinist (1891–1975)

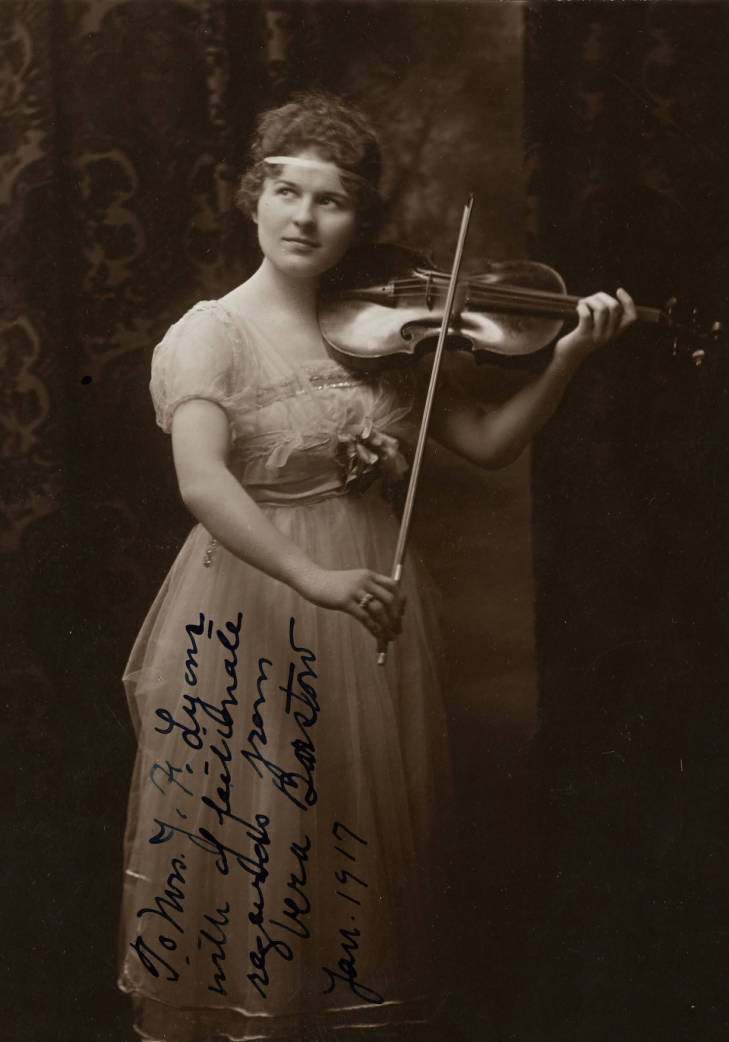
Vera Barstow in 1917.

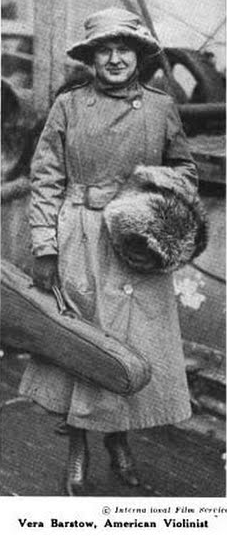
Vera Barstow in France during World War I, from a 1919 publication.

Vera Barstow (June 3, 1891 – June 10, 1975) was an American violinist and teacher. She made a three-month tour playing for troops in France during World War I.

== Early life ==
Vera Barstow was born in Celina, Ohio, but described as being from Pittsburgh, Pennsylvania. She trained in Europe. Luigi von Kunits was one of her teachers.

== Career ==
Barstow had a busy performing schedule, beginning with appearances in Pittsburgh, Philadelphia, Boston, and New York in 1912–1913 season. In 1916–1917 her tour of Canada was interrupted by an emergency surgery in Toronto. Of her 1917 appearance in Texas with Leo Ornstein, a critic reported that "Miss Barstow was delightful in every way and unquestionably one of the greatest women violinists we have heard."

In the spring of 1918, she toured Pennsylvania and Virginia, including a stop at Camp Lee with pianist Herma Menth, to play for American troops during World War I. She and Menth played gave further concerts for troops at Ellis Island and Camp Upton, working with the Stage Women's War Relief Society and the Jewish War Relief Society. She went to France to entertain the troops there for three months in 1918–1919. She described appearances of the all-female "Musical Foursome" at field hospitals and playing for German prisoners. "I have never seen so much mud in my life," she wrote. She also fell ill in the 1918 flu pandemic while in France.

Barstow made several recordings. Later in life, Barstow moved to southern California, where she gave concerts with pianist Helena Lewyn in the 1920s, and taught private students in Pasadena and also at the California State University, Long Beach. Among her students were Akira Endo, Elizabeth Morgridge Mills, Arlene Gattuso, Stanley Ellison Plummer, and Eric McCracken. She also coached the string section of the Pasadena Symphony. She announced her retirement in 1962, but was still teaching in 1969. Isaac Stern was among the musicians performing at a gala concert in her honor in 1968, in Pasadena, with proceeds to fund a scholarship named for Barstow.

== Personal life ==
Vera Barstow married William Pinkney Lawson; they had a daughter. Later she married John H. Meyers. She was widowed in 1935. She died in 1975, aged 84 years.
