= Farid Alakbarli =

Azerbaijani scholar (1964–2021)

Alakbarli
- Born: Farid Urxan oglu Alakbarov; January 3, 1964
- Died: April 7, 2021 (aged 57)
- Occupation: researcher
- Title: PhD, Doctor of Science, Professor
- Website: www.alakbarli.aamh.az

Farid Alakbarli (Azerbaijani: Fərid Ələkbərli; 3 January 1964 – 7 April 2021) was an Azerbaijani scholar, PhD and professor in history, specialist in the field of history of science, culturology, and medieval medical manuscripts, the head of Department of Information and Translation of the Institute of Manuscripts of the Azerbaijan National Academy of Sciences, president of the Azerbaijan Association of Medical Historians (AAMH), National Delegate from Azerbaijan to International Society for the History of Medicine (ISHM), author of more than 200 scientific and educational works including 23 books and booklets in Azeri Turkish, Russian, English, German and Italian.

Alakbarli was a significant researcher of the history of medicine in Azerbaijan. In 2005, Alakbarli created the first society on the history of medicine in this country – Azerbaijan Association of Medical Historians (AAMH), and organized in Baku first scientific conferences in this field in 2005 and 2006.

Alakbarli was the author of the first books in English on the history of medicine and medical manuscripts in ancient and medieval Azerbaijan. He also is the author of many books in Azeri and Russian, where many problems of the history of medicine and medieval medical manuscripts are researched.

In 2004–2005, he was responsible for the Memory of the World Programme of UNESCO in the Institute of Manuscripts in Baku. On 29 July 2005, UNESCO officially included three medieval medical manuscripts from the Institute of Manuscripts of the Azerbaijan National Academy of Sciences into the register of the Memory of the World Programme, which includes the most unusual and irreplaceable written monuments of the humankind.

In 2011–2013, he was the first Azerbaijani scholar who worked during long time in the Vatican Secret Archives and in Vatican Apostolic Library, where valuable medieval manuscripts related to Azerbaijan were discovered.

== Early life and youth ==
Farid Alakbarli was born in Ganja, Azerbaijan, and grew up in Baku, where he moved with his family at the age of one. He graduated from the secondary school No 134 (1981), and from Baku State University (1986)

== Scientific contribution ==
=== Traditional medicine ===
Based on the study of medieval (10th to 18th centuries) sources in the field of medicine and pharmacy, Alakbarli identified and studied in detail for the first time the concept of health protection, which existed in medieval Azerbaijan. He identified and studied the main features of this concept: health protection through the protection of the environment (air, soil, water), health protection through the proper management of dwellings, healthy living and disease prevention (nutrition, exercise, work and rest, and emotion regulation etc.), disease treatment (medicine and pharmacy). 724 species of plants, 150 species of animals, and 115 species of minerals used in the traditional medicine of medieval Azerbaijan have been explored and identified. A list was compiled with a detailed systematic review of examined species and the information on their medicinal properties. The information on 866 species of multi-component drugs, their classification dosage forms and therapeutic groups was identified and analyzed.

In 2004, Alakbarli with a group of colleagues founded the Azerbaijan Association of Medical Historians (AAMH). It was the first association for the study of the history of medicine in Azerbaijan. Alakbarli was elected the first president of this organization. In the same year, he became the first national representative of Azerbaijan in the International Society for the History of Medicine (ISHM).

=== Medieval Manuscripts ===
Alakbarli attracted to the study more than one hundred medieval manuscripts. As a result, for the first time the following unique manuscripts: "Arvah al-Ajsad" by Kamaladdin Kashani (15th century), "Khirga" by Murtuza Gulu Khan Shamlu (17th century), “Mualijati-munfarida” by Abulhasan Maragi (18th century) were discovered and investigated. Alakbarli translated a number of medieval manuscripts from Azerbaijani, Arabic and Persian into Russian and English. A total of 7 books of translations were published in Azeri, Russian and English. Translation of “Tibbname” was published by the St. Petersburg State University. It was the first medieval Azerbaijani treatise on medicine, published in Russian.

Books of Alakbarli about medieval manuscripts of Azerbaijan were published in Italian in 2011 and in English in 2012: "Azerbaijani manuscripts". Text by Alakbarli. Baku, Heydar Aliyev Foundation, 2012.

From 2011 to 2013 Alakbarli conducted research at Vatican libraries where he discovered numerous documents and medieval manuscripts related to Azerbaijan in Arabic, Persian and Turkish (Azeri and Ottoman).

=== History and Philosophy ===
Alakbarli is the author of the section in a special volume of the Azerbaijan National Encyclopedia, devoted to the history of the development of scientific knowledge in Azerbaijan since ancient times to the beginning of the 20th century.

In 2012 in Moscow, the Rudomino All-Russian Library of Foreign Literature published a collection of selected, including previously unpublished works of the Azerbaijani philosopher and playwright of the 19th century Mirza Fatali Akhund-Zadeh (Akhundov) compiled by Prof. Alakbarli co-authored with Dr. Ilya Zaytsev.

In 2013, in New York, there was published a book "Memories of Baku". The author of the chapter, which tells the history of Baku from ancient times to the beginning of the 20th century, is Alakbarli. The book is richly illustrated with historical photos of Baku of the 19th and early 20th centuries.

Alakbarli is the author of the philosophical book "Between Lie and Truth: Crisis of the Antihumane Civilization" which was published in Baku in Russian (2006) and Azerbaijani (2010)

== Selected works ==
=== Books in English ===
Alakbarli is the author of 12 books in different languages. These are some of them:

"Azerbaijan: medieval manuscripts, history of medicine, medicinal plants". (Baku, 2005).

"Medical Manuscripts of Azerbaijan" (Baku, 2006)

Co-author of the book "Memories of Baku" (Edited by Nicolas V. Iljine. Text by Fuad Akhundov, Alakbarli, Farah Aliyeva, Jahangir Selimkhanov, Tadeusz Swietochowski. New-York, Marquand Books, 2013)

=== Scientific papers ===
Alakbarli is the author of 150 scientific papers and educational articles. Some of them are cited below.

- Alakbarov, Farid U. (March 2001). "Medicinal Properties of Cannabis According to Medieval Manuscripts of Azerbaijan". Journal of Cannabis Therapeutics. 1 (2): 3–14. doi:10.1300/J175v01n02_02.
- Alakbarov, F. U. (January 2001). "Medicinal Plants Used in Medieval Azerbaijan Phytotherapy". Journal of Herbal Pharmacotherapy. 1 (3): 35–49. doi:10.1080/J157v01n03_04. S2CID 73345510.
- Alakbarov, Farid U. (2003). "Aromatic Herbal Baths of the Ancients - American Botanical Council". HerbalGram (57): 40–49.
- Alakbarli, F (June 2006). "Systematic analysis of animals used in medieval Azerbaijan medicine". Vesalius. 12 (1): 18–22. PMID 17153727.
- "Edwin D. Lawson, Alakbarli, Richard F. Sheil. Pronunciation and Meaning of Azeri Names". fredonia.edu.
- "Alakbarli Farid, Esmira Hajiyeva. "Tuhfat Al-Muminin" (1669 AD) by Muhammad Mumin as an Important Source on Traditional Islamic Medicine" (PDF). ishim.net.
- Khalili, Majid; Shoja, Mohammadali M.; Tubbs, R. Shane; Loukas, Marios; Alakbarli, Farid; Newman, Andrew J. (August 2010). "Illustration of the heart and blood vessels in medieval times". International Journal of Cardiology. 143 (1): 4–7. doi:10.1016/j.ijcard.2009.11.061. PMID 20060606.
- Hosseini, Seyed Fazel; Alakbarli, Farid; Ghabili, Kamyar; Shoja, Mohammadali M. (September 2011). "Hakim Esmail Jorjani (1042–1137 ad): Persian physician and jurist". Archives of Gynecology and Obstetrics. 284 (3): 647–650. doi:10.1007/s00404-010-1707-7. PMID 20931210. S2CID 2681493.
- Edwin D. Lawson, Alakbarli, Richard F. Sheil. The Mountains (Gorski) Jews of Azerbaijan: their Twenty-Century Naming Patterns. “These are the Names”. Studies in Jewish Onomastics. Vol. 5, Bar-Ilan University Press, Ramat Gan, 2011, p. 158-177

=== Educational articles ===
- Alakbarov Farid. The Institute of Manuscripts: Early Alphabets in Azerbaijan. Azerbaijan International Magazine, 8.1, 2000, pp. 50–53
- Alakbarov Farid. Voices from the Ages: Baku's Institute of Manuscripts. Azerbaijan International Magazine, 8.2, 2000, pp. 50–55
- Alakbarov Farid. Nutrition for Longevity. Azerbaijan International Magazine, 8.3, 2000, pp. 20–24
- Alakbarov Farid. Etiquette: Minding Your "P's and Q's" In Medieval Azerbaijan. Azerbaijan International Magazine, 8.3, 2000, pp. 32–36
- Alakbarov Farid. Ancient Wines: Exactly What the Doctor Ordered. Azerbaijan International Magazine, 8.3, 2000, pp. 38–42
- Alakbarov Farid. You Are What You Eat: Islamic Food Practices and Azerbaijani Identity. Azerbaijan International Magazine, 8.3, 2000, pp. 48–52
- Alakbarov Farid and Isgandar Aliyev. Silk Road: Origin of the Mulberry Tree. Azerbaijan International Magazine, 8.3, 2000, pp. 52–55
- Alakbarov Farid. Early Practice of Aromatherapy. Azerbaijan International Magazine, 9.1, 2001, pp. 37–40
- Alakbarov Farid. A 13th-Century Darwin? Tusi's Views on Evolution. Azerbaijan International Magazine, 9.2, 2001, pp. 48–49
- Alakbarov Farid. Writing Azerbaijan's History. Digging for the Truth. Azerbaijan International Magazine,9.3, 2001, pp. 40–49
- Alakbarov Farid. Baku's Architecture. Identity Of Architects And Financiers Revealed. Azerbaijan International Magazine, 9.4, 2001, pp. 30–36
- Alakbarov Farid. Koroghlu: Tbilisi Manuscript About Azerbaijani Hero. Azerbaijan International Magazine, 10.1, 2002, pp. 54–58
- Alakbarov Farid. Baku: City That Oil Built. Azerbaijan International Magazine, 10.2, 2002, pp. 28–33
- Alakbarov Farid. Baku's Old City: Memories of about How It Used to Be. Azerbaijan International Magazine, 10.3, 2002, pp. 38–45
- Alakbarov Farid. Baku's Institute of Manuscripts. Azerbaijan International Magazine, 10.3, 2002, pp. 45–46
- Alakbarov Farid. Atashgah As Seen By French Writer Alexander Dumas 150 Years Ago. Azerbaijan International Magazine, 11.2, 2003, pp. 52–53
- Alakbarov Farid. Azerbaijan – Land of Fire. Observation from the Ancients. Azerbaijan International Magazine, 11.2, 2003, p. 54
- Alakbarov Farid. Music therapy. What Doctors Knew Centuries Ago. Azerbaijan International Magazine, 11.3, 2003, p. 60
- Alakbarli Farid. Cures Through The Ages. Lion Hearts, Rhinoceros Horn and Wolf Paws. Azerbaijan International Magazine, 12.4, 2004, pp. 66–68
- Alakbarli Farid. Childagh. How to Cure a Bad Case of Nerves. Azerbaijan International Magazine, 12.4, 2004pp.68–70
- Alakbarli Farid. Aghakhan Aghabeyli: Azerbaijani genetist. Azerbaijan International Magazine, 2005, 13.1, p. 28
- Alakbarli Farid. The Science of Genetics under Stalin. Azerbaijan International Magazine, 13.1, 2005, p. 29
- Alakbarli Farid. Water Buffalo in Azerbaijan: Prized for its Milk and meat. Azerbaijan International Magazine, 13.1, 2005, p. 31
- Betty Blair and Alakbarli Farid. Sofi Hamid: Life Mirrored in Pastel Colors. Azerbaijan International Magazine, 13.1, 2005, pp. 40–63
- Alakbarli Farid. Amazons: Legends in History: Fearless Women Warriors in Life and Lore. Azerbaijan International Magazine, 13.1, 2005, pp. 74–77
- Alakbarli Farid. First International Medical Manuscript Conference. Azerbaijan International Magazine, 14.3, 2006, pp. 74–75
