= Sherene Rustomjee =

Indian Girl Guide executive

- Rustomjee from a 1958 newspaper
- Born: Sherene Behramjee Rustomjee; Approx. 1901; Bombay, India
- Died: 3 April 1967; Ledbury, England
- Occupation: Social worker
- Family: Sir Hiraji Cursetji (uncle)

Sherene Rustomjee (c.1901 - 3 April 1967) was an Indian Girl Guide executive and trainer. She worked for the Indian Red Cross Society Hospital Welfare Service in the 1940s, establishing its first training school in Bangalore. Through her friendship with German physiotherapist Erika Leuchtag, Rustomjee played a small part in helping to plan the King of Nepal's escape to India and consequently bringing about the end of the Rana dynasty in 1951.

== Personal life ==
Rustomjee was a Parsee. She was born and grew up in Bombay. She had a brother, Jamie (1904-1984).

She was good friends with Erika Leuchtag, the German physiotherapist who in 1949 travelled to Nepal to treat King Tribhuvan of Nepal and his first wife Queen Kanti of Nepal, who were being held captive by Nepal's Prime Minister, Mohan Shumsher Jung Bahadur Rana. By collecting and sending Leuchtag clippings from the Indian press that referenced the King, Nepal, the Rana dynasty and the Nepalese Congress party, Rustomjee contributed towards the plans to overthrow the Ranas, and ultimately return the King to the throne.

Rustomjee moved from India to Gloucestershire, England in 1954. She looked after her elderly uncle, Sir Hiraji Cursetji from 1962 until his death in 1964. She died at Ledbury Cottage Hospital.

== Girl Guides ==
Rustomjee started her Guiding career as captain of 13th Bombay Rangers. She was Girl Guiding's district commissioner for Byculla, Bombay from 1927 to 1929. In 1932 she travelled to England with ten Indian Girl Guides to earn the "Girl Guide diploma". While there they attended a training camp at Albury Park, also attended by the Chief Guide, Lady Baden-Powell. Upon Rustomjee's return to India she trained Guides, Rangers and their leaders in Bombay and Lahore.

In 1935, in order to "refresh her training", she returned to England, where she attained the red cord diploma. This earned her a mention in Iqbalunnisa Hussain's 1940 book "Changing India: A Muslim Woman Speaks". She then travelled to Adelboden where she attended international training courses and the Girl Guides Round Table of Trainers. Here she discussed the important role Guiding had played in India since its introduction to the country 20 years earlier: "In the early years of Guiding it was not possible to mix girls of different castes and religions; they could not cook together, not eat together. Today, I can safely say […] this attitude has changed; we have come to understand each other's point of view."

As a 'member for camping' she wrote an article entitled "Camping in 1935", which appeared in "The Indian Guide" magazine and also in "Matilda" magazine, its Australian counterpart. In 1936, Rustomjee met the Chief Guide again, as she was on a tour of India.

That same year, Rustomjee published an article entitled "Guiding Mutual Understanding" in World Association of Girl Guides and Girl Scouts (WAGGGS) Council Fire magazine, which asked "the movement's self-congratulatory and mostly white imperial internationalists to rethink their assumptions about 'other' populations and parts of the world." She would go on to become an Indian correspondent for Council Fire in the 1940s. She subsequently "gained the attention of the white leadership corps" of the WAGGGS in 1942, when her Guide companies took on the care of 161 Polish children, who had been displaced by the war in Europe. After WWII, WAGGGS appointed her to represent a number of newly independent Asian countries. Rustomjee joined the All-India Girl Guides Association committee in 1950.

After permanently moving to the UK in 1954, she continued her involvement with Guiding, including holding the role of Gloucestershire Guides' extension secretary.

== Red Cross ==
=== Indian Red Cross welfare service ===
In 1944 she became a staff officer for the newly-formed Indian Red Cross Hospital Welfare Service. She was put in charge of its central training school at St Mary's Home in Bangalore, which trained people who would go on to provide welfare services overseas, including Indonesia, Iraq and Iran. She spent time in Burma and Singapore.

After the partition of India in 1947 she worked in camps for refugees from Pakistan. In the same year she received the Kaisar-i-Hind medal for her service.

=== British Red Cross ===
After moving to the UK in 1954, Rustomjee worked for the Red Cross in Gloucestershire, where her role included running the picture library at Cashes Green Geriactric Hospital, Stroud.

== Awards and medals ==
Rustomjee received the following awards, diplomas and medals:

- Medal of Merit (1927)
- Chief's Diploma (1937)
- Jubilee medal (1935)
- King George VI Coronation Medal (1937)
- Indian Independence Medal (1947)
- Kaisar-i-Hind Medal (1947)
- The Order of St John of Jerusalem
- Burma Star
