= Kyohei Fujita =

Japanese glass artist

'Red and White Plum Blossoms', glass, silver, gold leaf and platinum leaf work by Kyohei Fujita, 1992, Metropolitan Museum of Art

Kyohei Fujita (藤田 喬平, Fujita Kyōhei, 1921 – September 18, 2004) was a Japanese glass artist. He received training early in his career as a worker in the factory of Toshichi Iwata and his early work shows Iwata's influence in style and materials. Fujita later matured as a glass artist and developed his own, unique style. With Histoshi Iwata, son of Toshichi Iwata, and fifty other artists, Fujita established the Japan Glass Artcrafts Association in 1972.

Kyohei Fujita is best known for his glass boxes with complicated surface decorations, and his work was included in the exhibit One of a Kind: The Studio Craft Movement at the Metropolitan Museum of Art in New York City, December 22, 2006 – September 3, 2007.
