= Hans-Ludwig Schilling =

German composer and music educator

Hans-Ludwig Schilling (9 March 1927 – 18 August 2012) was a German composer and music educator.

== Life ==
Born in Mayen, Schilling was musically instructed from early childhood on by his grandfather Johann Stoll. At the age of 13, he had studied music theory with the Cologne professors Heinrich Lemacher and violin in Bram Eldering's class. He studied composition with Harald Genzmer, Paul Hindemith, Nadia Boulanger, Antoine-Elisée Cherbuliez and Wolfgang Fortner. In addition to piano and bassoon, he also completed a degree in philosophy, literature and musicology. After earlier teaching positions (Freiburg im Breisgau and Karlsruhe), he has been head of the composition-theory-musicology department at the Hochschule für Musik Nürnberg since 1973.

== Work ==
Focal points in the compositional œuvre for all musical genres except opera (360 titles) are wind music, organ music and choral music. There are also 16 solo concertos with orchestra as well as symphonic wind music among other orchestral works.

- Concerto Tuba & Co Streichorchester ISMN M-2054-0523-6
- Weihnachts Partita Nr. 1 trumpet B/C, Streicher (2 violins, viola, violoncello, double bass) ISMN M-2054-0634-9
- Weihnachts Partita Nr. 1 trumpet B/C, Orgel ISMN M-50000-091-4
- Weihnachts Partita Nr. 2 trumpets B/C, Streicher (2 violins, viola, violoncello, double bass)
- Weihnachts Partita Nr. 2 trumpets B/C, Orgel ISMN M-50000-233-8
- Bagatelles en Suite / Clarinet or bass clarinet ISMN M-50000-815-6
- Osterhymnus Trompete B/C, organ ISMN M-50000-092-1
- Konzert in einem Satz / 2 trumpets B/C, organ ISMN M-2054-0571-7
- Impromptus (4)/3 trombone ISMN M-2054-0572-4
- Chant á sentiment trumpet B/C, Oogan ISMN M-2054-0154-2
- Tak - Dank Orgel ISMN M-2054-0141-2
- IV Pezzi Notturni / Vl, Va, Vc ISMN M-2054-0138-2
- Salonstücke (3) / violin, piano ISMN M-2054-0139-9
- Trois Èpisodes Lyriques / violin, piano ISMN M-2054-0136-8
- Drei lyrische Stücke Trompete B/C or (flügelhorn), Organ: Nr. 1 Consolati, ISMN M-50000-124-9; Nr. 2 Lamento ISMN M-50000-126-3; Nr. 3 Oratio ISMN M-50000-125-6
- Missa Brevis "Eibacher Messe" mixed Choir (S.A.T.B.) a cappella or with organ colla parte ISMN M-2054-0595-3
- Sonatina Trompete, piano ISMN M-50000-173-7
- Sonatina "Positano" flute Solo ISMN M-2054-0140-5
- Sonatina 2003 Klarin, piano ISMN M-2054-0493-2
- Trombola Suite, 4 trumpets (B or C); TP29, Editions Bim, CH-1674 Vuarmarens, Switzerland
- Adagio Lamentoso Streichertrio: Vl, Va, Vc ISMN M-2054-0137-5
- Suite in Memoriam Paul Hindemith Violine Solo ISMN M-2054-0491-8
- Divertimento for trumpet B/C, oboe, bassoon, harpsichord, double bass ISMN M-2054-0492-5
- St. Edmundsbury Music (Canzon’e Ricercare a 7) Brass Septet: 3 trumpets Bb/C, horn, 2 trombones, tuba or Brass Septet: 3 trumpets Bb/C, horn, 2 trombones, tuba ISMN M-2054-0489-5
- Floriani Suite for trumpet ISMN M-50000-597-1
- Sonatina Capricciosa clarinet, piano ISMN M-50000-599-5
- Mimus clarinet, piano ISMN M-50000-598-8
- Favorite Trompeten, piano ISMN M-50000-588-9
- Suite Palatium / 3 trumpets ISMN M-50000-593-3
- Amalfi Flöte Solo ISMN M-50000-594-0

== Literature ==
- T. Brandmüller, J. Dorfmüller, E.-M. Houben, K. Ch. Kratzenstein, S. Müller-Murrhardt, V. Olive, H. L. Schilling, A. J. Schmid, F. A. Stein, G. Theis (2001). Alexander L. Suder (ed.). Hans Ludwig Schilling. Tutzing: Hans Schneider. 962762873.
- Adolf J. Schmid (1982). Der Komponist Hans-Ludwig Schilling : Grafisches, Biografisches, Autobiografisches, Antiautobiografisches. Wiesbaden: Breitkopf und Härtel. 820827622.
