= Herma Menth =

Austrian pianist

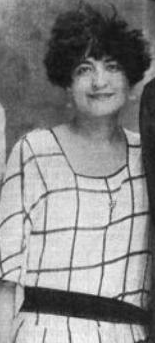
- Herma Menth, from a 1923 publication.
- Born: 1890; Vienna
- Died: February 25, 1968 (aged 77–78); New York City
- Occupation: Pianist

Herma Menth (1890 – February 25, 1968) was a pianist from Vienna. She lived in New York City and toured the U.S.

== Early life ==
Menth was from Vienna. She was a student of Ferruccio Busoni and Emil Sauer.

== Career ==
Menth played in New York in 1912. In the spring of 1918, Menth toured Pennsylvania and Virginia, including a stop at Camp Lee with American violinist Vera Barstow, to play for American troops. She and Barstow played gave more concerts for troops at Ellis Island and Camp Upton, sponsored by the Stage Women's War Relief Society and the Jewish War Relief Society. She also gave wartime benefit concerts at the Brooklyn Museum during World War II.

Menth played at the Hollywood Bowl in 1923. A New York Times reviewer described her as "a pianist of the most varied resources", because of the difficult program selections she set for her 1927 recital in New York, with works from Liszt and Mendelssohn to Scriabin and Dohnányi. She lived in New York, and played there often, including recitals in 1929, and in 1944, and at Carnegie Hall several times in the 1950s.

Menth made many piano roll recordings, and promoted the Angelus Reproducing Piano. One feature of her performances in the 1920s was a duet with herself, using a piano roll recording for the second piano, or "comparison pieces", in which she played live to fill gaps in a recording. She also gave radio concerts where the listeners were challenged to guess which pieces were recorded and which were live.

Menth made her final performing tour of the eastern United States in 1966.

== Personal life ==
Herma Menth was an avid cyclist and swimmer into her fifties. By 1911 she married Moritz Stoehr, a Viennese professor of bacteriology at the College of Mount Saint Vincent and invented a new keyboard, and a "music typewriter" for transcribing and transposing music. They lived in separate, adjacent apartments, an arrangement that was considered newsworthy. She died in 1968, aged 77 years, in New York.
