= Elizabeth Stern =

American physician

- Born: September 19, 1915; Cobalt, Ontario, Canada
- Died: August 18, 1980 (aged 64); Los Angeles
- Education: University of Toronto
- Known for: cancer
- Scientific career
- Fields: pathology

Elizabeth Stern (married name Elizabeth Stern Shankman, September 19, 1915 – August 18, 1980) was a Canadian-born American pathologist, especially well known for her insights on the cell's progression from a healthy to a cancerous state. Stern was one of the first scientists specializing in cytopathology, the study of diseased cells.

== Career ==
Stern received her medical degree from the University of Toronto in 1939 and the following year migrated to the United States, where she became a naturalized citizen in 1943. She completed residencies at the University of Pennsylvania School of Medicine and at Cedars of Lebanon and Good Samaritan Hospital, and was certified by the American Board of Pathology. She began her career as the Director of Laboratories and Research at the Cancer Detection Center of Los Angeles, California. During this time, Stern became interested in the progression of cervical cancer and published her first papers on the subject. In 1961 she became a research coordinator at the University of Southern California Medical School and began teaching classes in the department of pathology at the University of California at Los Angeles Medical School. In 1963 she joined the UCLA School of Public Health as an associate researcher, and was promoted to professor of epidemiology at UCLA in 1965.

== Research ==
Stern's research spanned multiple avenues of cervical cancer research, combining epidemiology and cytopathology to describe the progression and risk factors of cervical cancer.

She was a driving force in defining dysplasia as the earliest histological sign of cervical cancer development. In 1963 she published a study describing 10,000 women that her team observed over a two-year time period.^{[AC]} She found that the new cases of cervical cancer diagnosed at the end of the two-year period almost exclusively came from women that displayed cervical dysplasia at the beginning of the study. Future follow-up studies from her lab would further validate that dysplasia, although reversible, demonstrates increased risk for development of cervical cancer. In 1974 she published a paper detailing a 100-point scale for histological analysis of cervical cancer.^{[CR]} This article described all stages of cervical cancer, including the earliest stages of dysplasia, and detailed the abnormal cellular morphology observed in each category. Today, following a routine Pap test, women that have dysplastic cervical cells are monitored closely for potential cervical cancer development.

Stern was also interested in the possible connections between combined oral contraceptive pills and cervical cancer. She conducted epidemiological studies, surveying more than 10,000 women in the Los Angeles County area and keeping track of their contraceptive choice and Pap test results over a 7-year period. She found that women on the pill for the duration of the 7-year study had a 6-fold increased risk for the development of cervical cancer. Her results were published in Science in 1977, and helped prompt the reformulation of the high-dose Enovid birth control pill.^{[S]}

In order to have access to the most high-risk patients, Stern's lab set up free women's medical clinics in poor communities of Los Angeles county. She set up several sociological and epidemiological studies to determine the factors that drive women to participate in free clinics and receive free preventative health care.^{[NCI]} Her team made several observations that remain true today: women need help with childcare, transportation, and more flexible hours, in order to take advantage of free medical services. They also noted that many women were more willing to participate in their studies if the physician or nurse performing the exam was also a woman.^{[MC]}

Her breakthrough studies of cervical cancers changed the disease from fatal to one of the most easily diagnosed and treatable. This allowed the development of effective diagnostic techniques and prophylactic measures (excision of abnormal tissue), which, combined with this cancer's slow rate of metastasis, reduced its fatality rate drastically.

== Selected publications ==
- AC.	Stern, E; Neely, PM (November–December 1963). "Carcinoma and dysplasia of the cervix: A comparison of rates for new and returning populations". Acta Cytologica. 7: 357–361. PMID 14074943.
- CR.	Stern, E; Forsythe, AB; Youkeles, L; Dixon, WJ (September 1974). "A cytological scale for cervical carcinogenesis". Cancer Research. 34 (9): 2358–2361. PMID 4843536.
- S.	Stern, E; Forsythe, AB; Youkeles, L; Dixon, WJ (June 1977). "Steroid contraceptive use and cervical dysplasia: Increased risk of progression". Science. 196 (4297): 1460–1462. Bibcode:1977Sci...196.1460S. doi:10.1126/science.867043. PMID 867043.
- NCI.	Stern, E; Misczynski, M; Damus, K; Coulson, A (December 1977). "Papanicolaou testing and hysterectomy prevalence in low-income communities: A survey in Los Angeles County". National Cancer Institute Monograph. 47: 113–9. PMID 613231.
- MC.	Misczynski, M; Stern, E (March 1979). "Detection of cervical and breast cancer: A community-based pilot study". Medical Care. 17 (3): 304–13. doi:10.1097/00005650-197903000-00008. JSTOR 3763963. PMID 763008.

== See also ==
- Timeline of women in science
