= Konniyoor Meenakshi Amma =

Konniyoor Meenakshi Amma (March 3, 1901 – August 28, 1980) was an educator and writer who was active in the socio-cultural scene of Kerala in the early 20th century.

== Early life and education ==
She was born into a Nair family in Konniyoor.

Meenakshi Amma completed her schooling in Konni and Chengannur and pursued higher education in Thiruvananthapuram. She experimented with innovative methods in literature at that time.

== Career ==
Meenakshi Amma became a social worker and educator who became the first woman in the district to obtain a postgraduate degree.

She had a teaching career in Thiruvananthapuram (1925–1956) and was inspired by Mahatma Gandhi to engage in social work. After retiring, she went back to Konniyoor and helped with infrastructure development, healthcare improvements, and access to electricity.

She was an author and translator of books including Atmabali, Pushpakam, and Neenda Nizhal. The narrative of her book Neendazhingal is told through a sequence of letters.

== Legacy ==
She was honoured with a library name in 1975.

== Other writings ==
- Flower
- Self sacrifice
- Heroic warrior
