= Toshichi Iwata =

Japanese glass artist (1893–1980)

- 岩田 藤七
- Born: Tojiro Iwata; March 12, 1893; Nihonbashi, Tokyo, Japan
- Died: August 23, 1980 (aged 87)
- Education: Hakuba-kai Western Painting Institute, Tokyo School of Fine Arts
- Alma mater: Tokyo School of Fine Arts
- Known for: Making in Japan, glass art design

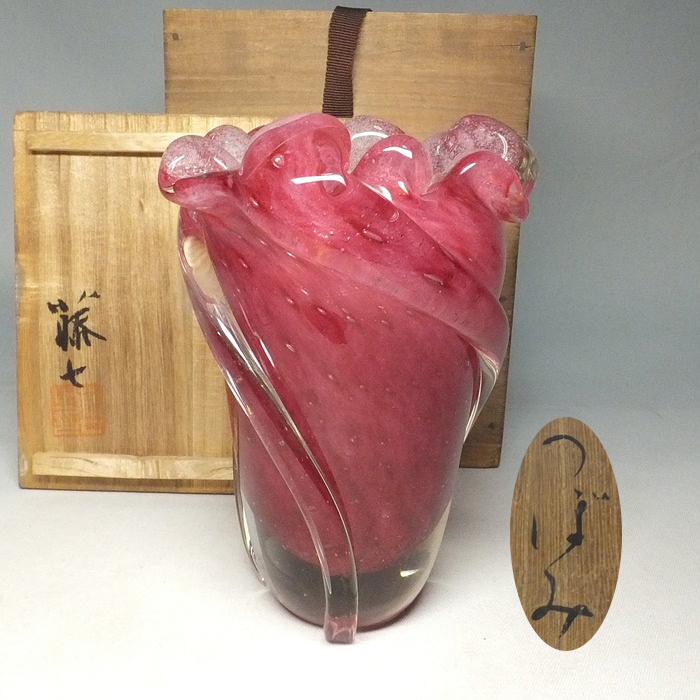
Glass vase titled "Flower Bud", by Toshichi Iwata with wood tomobako made by the artist, circa 1950, private collection. This vase was later reproduced in a simpler form for production in the Iwata factory with the factory label.

Toshichi Iwata (岩田 藤七, Iwata Tōshichi; 12 March 1893– 23 August 1980) was a Japanese glass artist considered to be the founding father of modern art glass making in Japan. Active from 1927 until his death, he created unique studio works as well as production pieces. During his lifetime, Iwata was considered to be Japan's foremost authority on modern glass craft.

== Career ==
Toshichi Iwata studied Western painting under Saburosuke Okada at the Hakuba-kai Western Painting Institute in 1911. Iwata attended the Tokyo School of Fine Arts for twelve years, where he studied in the metal work and Western oil painting departments. He learned engraving from Shomin Unno and Shigeyuki Hirata, and lacquer art from Shisui Rokkaku. He studied sculpture under Taimu Tatehata in 1922.

Iwata graduated in 1918 from the metal craft department and earned a BA in Western oil painting in 1923. It was during this time that he became interested in crafting art glass and ultimately chose to pursue a career as a glass artist. Iwata next studied under Imamura Shigezo at the Tachibana Glass Factory. From 1927 until 1937 he worked as a designer for the Tokyo Tokei watch company and also participated in glass research at the Iwaki Glass Laboratory before 1930. In 1931 he founded the Iwata Glass Manufacturing Co., Ltd. He became a member of the Tokyo Prefectural Art Preservation Council and Tokyo Crafts Association Exhibition of Arts and Crafts Department Exhibition Jury in 1941.

His studio, in 1943, was designated as a glass manufacturing residual factory and Iwata, individually, as a person qualified in preserving important craft technology by the Ministry of Commerce and Industry. His 10th solo exhibition was temporarily suspended, in 1944, due to the intensification of the war. He exhibited at a special wartime exhibition which was purchased by the government.

World War II apparently disrupted Iwata's endeavors and in 1947 he and his wife founded the Iwata Glass Industrial Company where factory art glass was produced by workers and unique pieces were produced by members of the Iwata family.

He was appointed a Chief Judge of the Japan Exhibition in 1957 and Advisor to the Japan Exhibition in 1958. He was a member of the Japan Glass Crafts Association Award Selection Committee in 1962 and became Standing Director of the Japan Glass Crafts Association in 1966. In 1972 he was one of the founders of the Japan Glass Art and Crafts Association and became an Honorary Member. Other founders included his previous student Kyohei Fujita and his son Hisatoshi Iwata.

== Exhibitions and awards ==
Iwata exhibited at the 4th Imperial Exhibition "Deep Sky" (sculpture) for the first time in 1922. He received a Certificate of Commendation from the 12th Craft Exhibition (Metalworking) of the Ministry of Commerce and Industry in 1925. He won the Ministry of Commerce and Industry 13th Craft Exhibition (Metalworking) 3rd prize in 1926. After being selected three times in a row from the 9th Imperial Exhibition in 1928, Iwata then exhibited every year at the Imperial Exhibition, Bun Exhibition, and Nitten Exhibition. Iwata established a workshop in Kosuge-cho, Katsushika-ku in 1931 and exhibited glass from the 8th Imperial Exhibition onward. Iwata exhibited his work at the Nitten National Exhibition, before and after the Second World War. He served as an exhibition judge there later in life. He held his first solo exhibition in 1935.

=== Awards ===
- 1937 Paris Universal Crafts Exhibition Silver Award
- 1951 Japan Art Academy Prize
- 1969 Mainichi Art Award
- Person of Cultural Merit (1970)
- Order of the Sacred Treasure (1980)

== Public collections ==
Works by Toshichi Iwata have been collected by numerous museums and galleries, including The National Museums of Modern Art, in Tokyo and Kyoto and the Hokkaido Museum of Modern Art in Sapporo, Hokkaido. Several of his pieces are held in the Metropolitan Museum of Art, New York. A survey of his work in book form was published in Japan in 1993.

Works bearing the Iwata Glass Company label are often attributed as the work of Toshichi Iwata, or other members of his family, but are hand made art glass produced by workers in his factory. The original design for the factory glass was typically created by a member of the Iwata family, especially in the early years of operation. Toshichi Iwata was known to join his workers on the factory floor, from time to time, but labeled work should not be attributed to him but to his factory. Studio works by Toshichi Iwata were typically accompanied by a wooden tomobako, which he also made and signed. His studio works were not signed or labeled. Iwata factory produced art glass is also often found in museum and gallery collections, though not always properly attributed.

== Personal life ==
Iwata was born on 12 March 1893 in Nihonbashi, Tokyo. As a child, Iwata was known as Tojiro. He married Kuniko "Kuni" Kyuichi, the eldest daughter of sculptor Takeuchi Kyuichi.

The oldest son of Toshichi and Kuniko Iwata, Hisatoshi "Kuri" Iwata, was also a well known glass artist as were Hisatoshi's wife, Itoko and their daughter, Ruri.

Toshichi Iwata died on 23 August 1980.
