= Albert Heux =

French cyclist

Personal information
- Born: 15 February 1892
- Died: 26 August 1980 (aged 88)

Cycling career
- Sport: Cycling
- Role: Rider

Albert Heux (15 February 1892 – 26 August 1980) was a French racing cyclist. He rode in the 1919 Tour de France.
