= Antonio Fayenz =

Italian footballer (1899-1980)

Personal information
- Full name: Antonio Fayenz
- Date of birth: 2 November 1899
- Place of birth: Padua, Italy
- Date of death: 16 August 1980 (aged 80)
- Place of death: Padua, Italy
- Position: Midfielder

Senior career*
Years	Team	Apps	(Gls)
1919–1930	Padova	174	(11)
1930–1931	Bassano	?	(?)

International career
1925–1926	Italy	4	(0)
- * Club domestic league appearances and goals

Antonio Fayenz (Italian pronunciation: [anˈtɔːnjo ˈfaːjents]; 2 November 1899 – 16 August 1980) was an Italian footballer who played as a midfielder. On 22 March 1925, he represented the Italy national football team on the occasion of a friendly match against France in a 7–0 home win. He was also part of Italy's squad for the 1924 Summer Olympics, but he did not play in any matches.
