= Alan Welch =

Australian rules footballer

Personal information
- Full name: Alan Robert Welch
- Born: 3 November 1910; Ballarat East, Victoria
- Died: 15 August 1980 (aged 69); Canberra, ACT
- Original team: South Surfers
- Height: 184 cm (6 ft 0 in)
- Weight: 85 kg (187 lb)
- Position: Forward

Playing career^{1}
Years	Club	Games (Goals)
1933–1937	South Melbourne	49 (24)
- ^{1} Playing statistics correct to the end of 1937.

Alan Robert Welch (3 November 1910 – 15 August 1980) was an Australian rules footballer who played for the South Melbourne Football Club in the Victorian Football League (VFL).
