= Harold Loukes =

Harold Loukes (1 March 1912 – 7 August 1980) was a British academic in India and at the University of Oxford.

Loukes was born in Ecclesall, Sheffield, Yorkshire. He was educated at the Central Secondary School in Sheffield before studying English at Jesus College, Oxford. He obtained a first-class degree in 1934 and then spent 10 years teaching at the University of Delhi and at the New School in Darjeeling, where he was headmaster. In 1945, he returned to Britain, teaching for four years before being appointed a lecturer in the Department of Education of the University of Oxford. In 1951, he was promoted to Reader in Education; he spent a total of 30 years in the department. In addition to his publications, he was a magistrate and member of Oxford City Education Committee.

He was a devoted member of the Society of Friends, known as the Quakers, and his books on the subject included Friends Face Reality, The Discovery of Quakerism, and The Quaker Contribution.
