= Bram Eldering =

Deutch violinist and music pedagogue (1865-1943

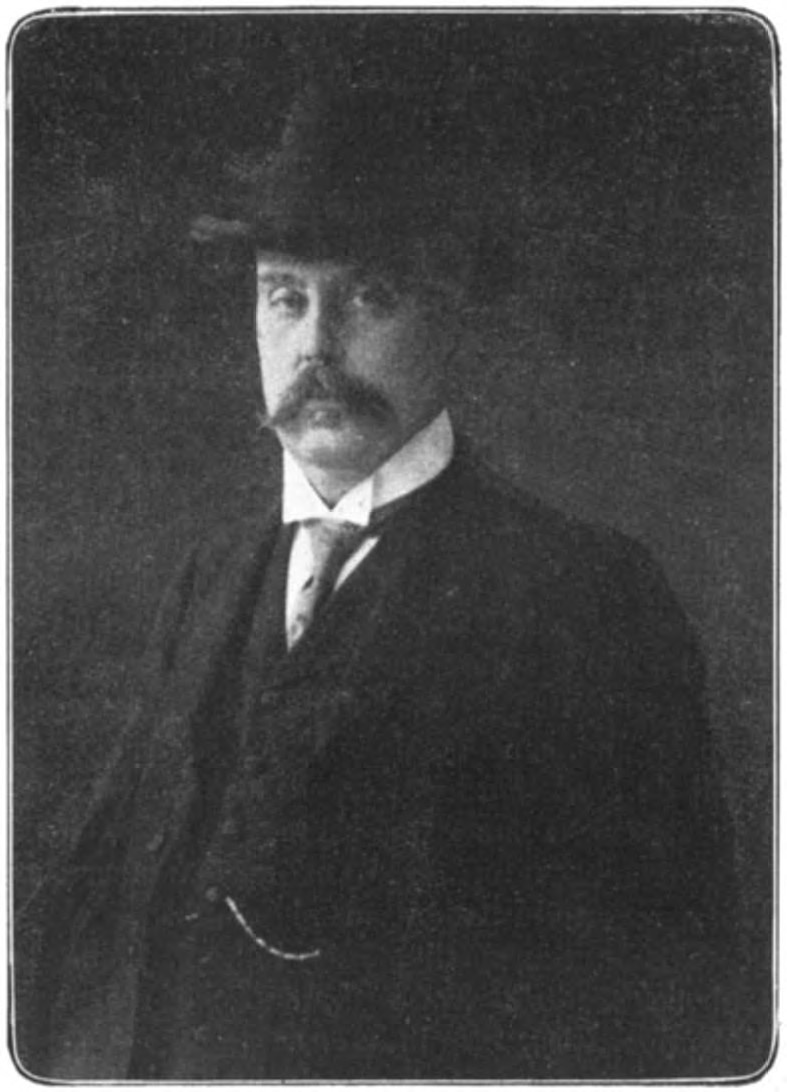
- Bram Eldering
- Born: Abraham Eldering; 8 July 1865; Groningen, Netherlands
- Died: June 17, 1943 (aged 77); Riehl
- Education: Royal Conservatory of Brussels, Franz Liszt Academy of Music
- Occupations: violinist and pedagogue

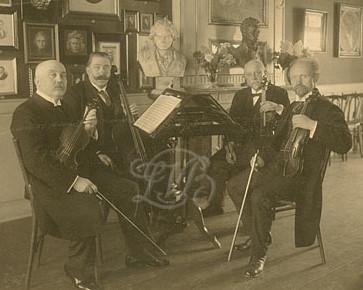
The Bram Eldering Quartet in the Beethoven House in Bonn

Abraham "Bram" Eldering (8 July 1865 – 17 June 1943) was a Dutch violinist and music pedagogue.

== Life ==
Born in Groningen, Bram (abbreviation of Abraham) Eldering studied violin with Jenő Hubay at the Royal Conservatory of Brussels. After his appointment to the Franz Liszt Academy of Music in Budapest, he followed his teacher in 1886. With Victor von Herzfeld and David Popper he played in Hubay's String quartet. In 1888 he moved to Berlin to continue his studies with Joseph Joachim.

In 1893 he was concertmaster of the Berlin Philharmonic under Hans von Bülow.

In 1894, after von Bülow's death, he became concertmaster of the Meiningen Court Orchestra, of which he was a member until 1899. At the invitation of the industrialist family Weyermann, he took part with other members of the orchestra in an intimate chamber music festival at Schloss Hagerhof near Bad Honnef at Whitsun 1896 and took part in the performance of Robert Schumann's String Quartet in A major and Johannes Brahms's Piano quintet F-minor - with Brahms at the piano.

In 1899 he was appointed as a docent at the Conservatorium van Amsterdam. From 1903 he taught as professor at the Rheinische Musikschule.

One of his students was Theo Giesen, who later became first concertmaster of the Gürzenich Orchestra Cologne, then founding member and first concertmaster of the Cologne Radio Symphony Orchestra (KRSO) later called WDR Symphony Orchestra Cologne.

He also became first violinist in the Gürzenich Quartet founded by Gustav Hollaender in 1888, to which Carl Körner, Josef Schwartz and Friedrich Grützmacher der Jüngere belonged. As the Bram-Eldering Quartet, the ensemble achieved world fame. After the death of Friedrich Grützmacher in 1919, Emanuel Feuermann took over the cello part.

Along with his Amsterdam successor Carl Flesch, with whom he had written correspondence, he was one of the most influential violin teachers of his time. Among his students were Ernst-Lothar von Knorr, Adolf Busch, Hans-Ludwig Schilling, Max Strub, Siegfried Borries, Hans Raderschatt, Quirin Rische and Wilhelm Stross.

Eldering died at the age of 77 on 17 June 1943 in a bombing raid on his home in Riehl (Köln).

== Work ==
- Konzert des Gürzenich-Quartett Dienstag, den 16. Februar 1909, abends 8 Uhr; [Programm:] A. Dvorák: Quartett F-dur op. 96. Ludwig van Beethoven: Quartett A-dur op. 18. Franz Schubert: Quartett G-dur op. 161.
- Kadenzen : zum Mozart-Violin-Konzert G-Dur.

== Literature ==
- Willi Kahl (1959). "Eldering, Bram". Neue Deutsche Biographie (in German). Vol. 4. Berlin: Duncker & Humblot. p. 436. (full text online).
- Willi Kahl: Bram Eldering, in MGG (1949–86), vol. 3, pp. 1243–1244
- Berliner Philharmoniker: Variationen mit Orchester – 125 Jahre Berliner Philharmoniker, vol. 2, Biografien und Konzerte, Verlag Henschel, May 2007, ISBN 978-3-89487-568-8
