= Herbert Panse =

German footballer and manager

Personal information
- Date of birth: 6 March 1914
- Date of death: 25 August 1980 (aged 66)
- Position: Midfielder

Senior career*
| Years | Team | Apps | (Gls) |
- Eimsbütteler TV

International career
| 1935 | Germany | 1 | (1) |

Managerial career
- 1949–1950: SpVgg Andernach
- 1952: Lüneburger SK
- 1952–1954: Altona 93
- * Club domestic league appearances and goals

Herbert Panse (6 March 1914 – 25 August 1980) was a German international footballer who played as a midfielder.
