= Lewis Joslyn =

American politician and lawyer

Lewis Danforth Joslyn (November 14, 1907 – August 29, 1980) was an American Democratic politician and lawyer who served in the Missouri General Assembly. He served in the Missouri Senate from 1941 until 1945 and in the Missouri House of Representatives from 1935 until 1937.

Born in Charleston, Missouri, he graduated from the University of Missouri with A.B. and LL.B degrees. He also served as prosecuting attorney of Mississippi County, Missouri. In 1937, Joslyn married Margaret Bernice "Peggy" Gallup of Waterloo, Iowa, who died July 3, 2010, at her home in Charleston, Missouri, at age 98.
