= Albert Scheflen =

American psychiatrist

- Born: November 15, 1920; Camden County, New Jersey, U.S.
- Died: August 17, 1980 (aged 59); Philadelphia, Pennsylvania, U.S.
- Education: University of Pennsylvania School of Medicine
- Known for: Context analysis, research on non-verbal communication
- Scientific career
- Fields: Psychiatry, psychoanalysis, kinesics
- Institutions: Temple University Medical Center; Albert Einstein College of Medicine

Albert Edward Scheflen (15 November 1920 – 17 August 1980) was an American psychiatrist and psychoanalyst whose studies of kinesics and the "context analysis" of interaction helped establish the systematic investigation of face-to-face communication. His books, notably Body Language and the Social Order (1972), influenced later work in linguistics, anthropology and family therapy.

== Early life and education ==
Scheflen was born in Camden County, New Jersey, in November 1920. He earned an M.D. from the University of Pennsylvania and completed psychoanalytic training at the Philadelphia Psychoanalytic Institute. During the Second World War, he served as a medical officer in the United States Navy.

== Career ==
After demobilization Scheflen joined the psychiatry faculty at Temple University Medical Center, where from 1956 he led a team that used filmed psychotherapy sessions to pioneer a “natural history method” for analysing interaction. His early papers on communicational structure, published in American Behavioral Scientist, attracted the attention of Ray Birdwhistell and Adam Kendon, and in 1966–1967 he held a fellowship at the Center for Advanced Study in the Behavioral Sciences (CASBS) to refine the approach.

In the late 1960s, Scheflen became professor of psychiatry at the Albert Einstein College of Medicine, directing research on human communication at the Bronx Psychiatric Center. Over the next decade, he expanded context analysis in the books Communicational Structure (1973) and How Behavior Means (1974).
