= Ranny Williams =

Jamaican comedian and actor

Ranny Williams CD
- Born: Randolph Samuel Williams; October 26, 1912; Colón, Panama
- Died: August 11, 1980 (aged 67); Jamaica
- Other name: Mas Ran
- Citizenship: Jamaica; Panama
- Years active: 1930–1980
- Known for: Ring Ding; The Marijuana Affair; A High Wind in Jamaica

Comedy career
- Medium: Stand-up; television; radio; film
- Genres: Sketch comedy; television comedy; radio comedy; pantomime; satire
- Subjects: Social and Human Behavior; Folklore; Caribbean Identity; Topical Humor; Family and Community

Randolph Samuel Williams (October 26, 1912 – August 11, 1980), also known as Mas Ran and Ranny Williams, was a Jamaican comedian and actor. Born in Colón, Panama, he moved to Jamaica with his mother when he was six. He hosted television shows, appeared in movies and teamed with Louise Bennett for a show.

Williams is honored at the National Heroes Park in Kingston. The Ranny Williams Entertainment Centre, which includes the Ranny Williams Amphitheatre with seating for 2,500 persons and the Louise Bennett Garden Theatre, is named for him.
