= John Lord (footballer, born 1899) =

Australian rules footballer

Personal information
- Full name: Leslie John Lord
- Born: 16 September 1899; Cobden, Victoria
- Died: 14 August 1980 (aged 80); Echuca, Victoria
- Original team: Footscray (VFA)
- Height: 191 cm (6 ft 3 in)
- Weight: 85 kg (187 lb)

Playing career^{1}
| Years | Club | Games (Goals) |
| 1920 | Footscray (VFA) | 3 (2) |
| 1921–23 | Melbourne | 24 (7) |
| 1924–26 | St Kilda | 30 (18) |
| 1927 | Williamstown (VFA) | 17 (17) |
| 1928–31 | Prahran (VFA) | 67 (95) |
- ^{1} Playing statistics correct to the end of 1931.

Leslie John Lord (16 September 1899 – 14 August 1980) was an Australian rules footballer who played with Melbourne and St Kilda in the Victorian Football League (VFL).
