= Anna Piasecka =

Polish politician, educator and activist (1882–1980)

Anna Anastazja Piasecka (March 13, 1882 – August 8, 1980) was a Polish politician, educator and activist. She served in the Legislative Sejm of the Second Polish Republic.

The daughter of Paweł Łęgowski and Julianny z Balcerowiczów, she was born Anna Anastazja Łęgowska in Feliksowo near Wąbrzeźno in West Prussia. She worked as a Polish language teacher and established the first Polish kindergarten in Kwidzyn in 1919.

She was elected to the Sejm for Kościerzyna district in a by-election held in Pomerania in May 1920 as a member of the National Workers' Party. At the end of 1920, she joined the Polish People's Party "Piast".

She was a member of a group which worked towards the East Prussian plebiscite of 1920.

She married Jan Piasecki.

At the end of 1920, Piasecka moved to Toruń where she later died at the age of 98.
