= Helena Lewyn =

American pianist (1889–1980)

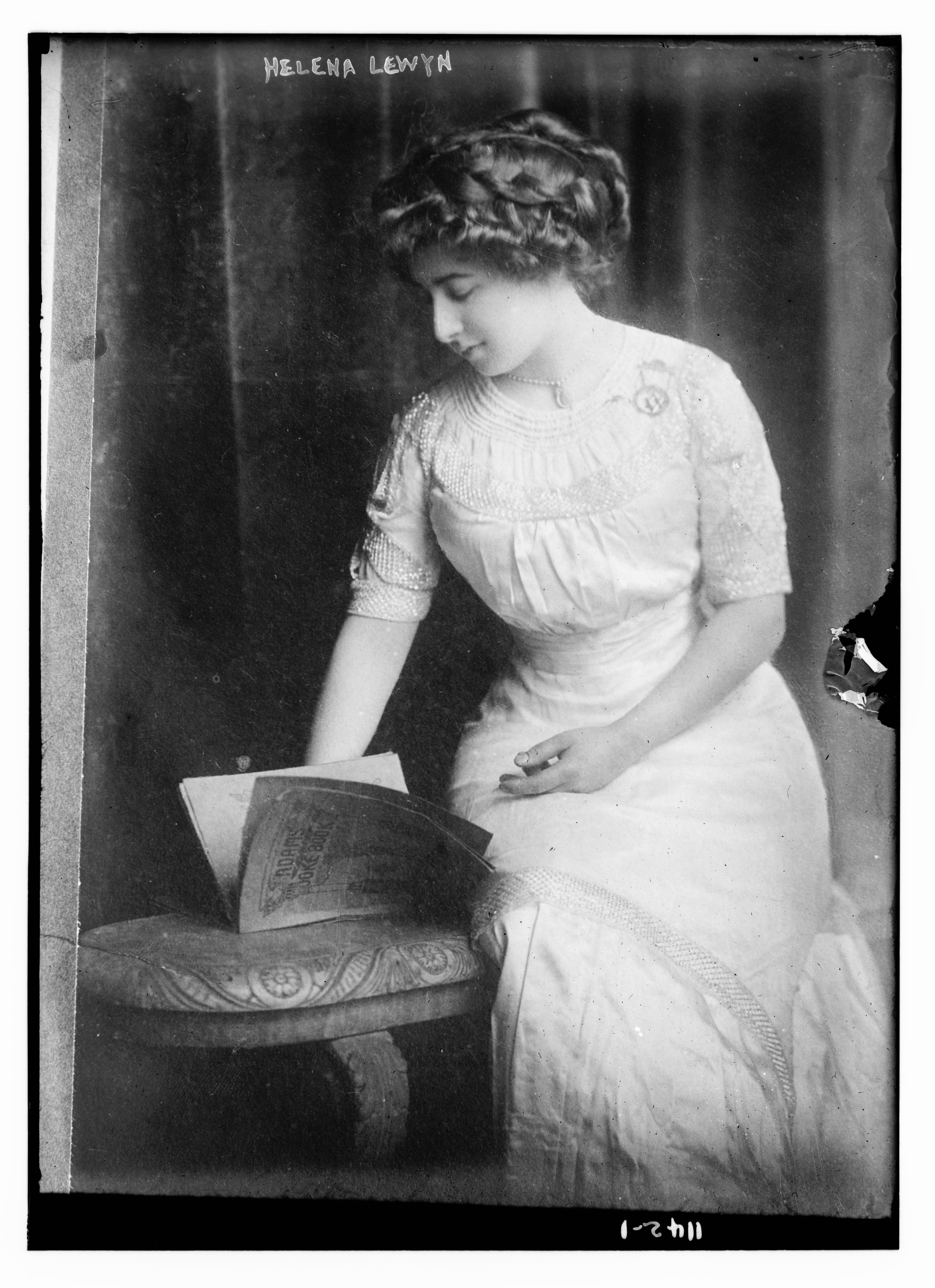
- Helena Lewyn, from the Library of Congress
- Born: December 16, 1889; Houston, Texas, U.S.
- Died: August 30, 1980 (aged 90); Grants Pass, Oregon, U.S.
- Other names: Helena Lewyn-Hassenstein
- Occupations: Pianist; piano teacher
- Spouse: Walter Kurt Max Hassenstein (m. 1928, divorced)

Helena Lewyn (December 16, 1889 – August 30, 1980) was an American pianist, composer, and piano teacher.

== Early life ==
Lewyn was born in Houston, Texas, the daughter of Isadore Lewyn and Carrie Jeremias Lewyn. Her family was Jewish; her parents were both born in Germany, and her father was a druggist. She showed musical aptitude from early childhood. She studied piano with Fannie Bloomfield Zeisler in Chicago and with Conrad Ansorge and Leopold Godowsky in Berlin. She also studied composition with Edgar Stillman Kelley.

== Career ==
Lewyn toured giving concerts in Germany in 1909, made her London debut at Bechstein Hall in the spring of 1910, and toured with the New York Symphony Orchestra under Walter Damrosch from 1910 to 1912. In 1910 the Houston Music Festival Association presented her with a gold medal, to "cordially congratulate you upon making such a triumphant American debut in your home city."

Lewyn was based in Los Angeles by the end of 1922. She served on the advisory board for the Hollywood Bowl summer concerts, and participated in a benefit event for the Los Angeles Music School Settlement in 1925. She also performed at the Hollywood Bowl on several occasions. She and violinist Vera Barstow gave a series of joint performances in southern California and on radio programs in the 1920s. She also performed with violinist Ben Whitman.

In the 1930s and 1940s, she continued to give concerts, including radio concerts, and taught at her own piano studio on Sunset Boulevard in Los Angeles. One of her students was actor Bobby Breen. "Her program, although on the conventional side, was meaty, judiciously built and executed with musicianly aplomb," commented one reviewer in 1945.

Lewyn was known to compose music. She set a poem by fellow Texan Judd Mortimer Lewis to music in 1910. She owned an antique German piano.

== Personal life ==
Lewyn married Walter Kurt Max Hassenstein in Berlin in 1928; they later divorced. She died in 1980, at the age of 90, while on vacation in Grants Pass, Oregon.
