= José María Puig =

Spanish water polo player (1903–1980)

Personal information
- Nationality: Spanish
- Born: 26 September 1903; Barcelona, Spain
- Died: 5 August 1980 (aged 76); Barcelona, Spain

Sport
- Sport: Water polo

José María Puig (26 September 1903 – 5 August 1980) was a Spanish water polo player. He competed at the 1924 Summer Olympics and the 1928 Summer Olympics.
