= Ray Wittelsberger =

American hockey player

Personal information
- Nationality: American
- Born: March 16, 1925 Baltimore, Maryland, United States
- Died: August 29, 1980 (aged 55) Baltimore, Maryland, United States

Sport
- Sport: Field hockey

Ray Wittelsberger (March 16, 1925 – August 29, 1980) was an American field hockey player. He competed in the men's tournament at the 1956 Summer Olympics.
