= Cor van Nus =

Dutch footballer

Personal information
- Date of birth: 29 May 1905
- Date of death: 9 August 1980 (aged 75)

International career
Years	Team	Apps	(Gls)
1926	Netherlands	1	(0)

Cor van Nus (29 May 1905 – 9 August 1980) was a Dutch footballer. He played in one match for the Netherlands national football team in 1926.
