= Arturo Carvajal Acuña =

Chilean politician

Chamber of Deputies of Chile

Personal details
- Born: Arturo Carvajal Acuña; March 25, 1909 Chile
- Died: August 5, 1980 (aged 71)

Arturo Carvajal Acuña (March 25, 1909 – August 5, 1980) was a Chilean politician. He was president of the Union of the Iris Office and Provincial Secretary of the Chile Central labor Trade union (CUT). He was an elected member of the Chamber of Deputies of Chile between 1965 and 1973.

== Biography ==
He was born in Sotaquí, Ovalle, on March 25, 1909. He died on August 5, 1980. He was the son of Salvador Carvajal and Delfina Acuña and was married to Elena González Pérez.

He worked as a miner in the Chuquicamata mine since 1939, the largest open-pit copper mine in the world, located in the north of Chile. He studied at Antofagasta School, although he did not finish the school and quit at primary level, then he joined the trade union organization and started his political campaigns.

== Career ==
In 1963 Acuña was elected Mayor of Iquique and in 1965, being a member of the Communist Party. He was elected as deputy by the departmental group of Arica, Iquique and Pisagua, Chile for four years (1965–1969) and re-elected in 1969. He belonged to the permanent commissions of interior minister, sports, public works and transportation.

He also participated in the Investigation Commission of the Steel Industry (1967–1968).

Acuña with many members of the Communist Party band together in an underground Resistance movement. He was being persecuted and detained a couple of times, in Villa Grimaldi that were used for the interrogation and torture of political prisoners during the governance of Augusto Pinochet. He died in August 1980.

== Bibliography ==
- Biographies of Chileans Members of the Executive, Legislative and Judicial Powers 1876–1973; Armando de Ramón Folch; Editions Pontifical Catholic University of Chile, Santiago of Chile, Chile, 1999; volume 1.
