= Erika Leuchtag =

German physiotherapist

- Leuchtag from a 1958 newspaper
- Born: Erika Kate Leuchtag; 29 August 1908; Hamburg, Germany
- Died: 11 August 1980 (aged 71); Hendon, London, England

Erika Leuchtag (29 August 1908 – 11 August 1980) was a German physiotherapist. In 1949 she became the first European to enter the King of Nepal's palace in Kathmandu, where she was hired to treat the King's senior wife, Queen Kanti of Nepal. Leuchtag quickly began to treat the King too, and the two developed a close friendship. She supported him in his plans to overthrow the Prime Minister of the Rana dynasty, which had controlled the Shah dynasty and kept the royal family under house arrest for a century. In 1957 the Rank Organisation paid a "record price" for the film rights to her book With a King in the Clouds, before it had been written.

== Personal life ==
Leuchtag was born in Hamburg, Germany. She left Germany in April 1939 "because of the rise of Hitler" and travelled to India. In October 1952, after 12 years in Asia, including time spent in Nepal, she moved to England. By 1957 she was living on Fitzjohns Avenue, Hampstead. At the time of her death in 1980 she was living in Mill Hill, North London.

== Career ==
While in India Leuchtag worked for the royal family in Patiala, treating "Marquesses and Maharanis". In December 1948 Leuchtag was invited by the Nepali government to treat Queen Kanti of Nepal in Kathmandu. "Against the advice of her mother and almost all of her friends" she travelled there with her servant, Gorki Ram.

Within a week of arriving, she also began to treat the King. They developed a close friendship, which included Leuchtag's teaching him to dance and speak German. She also talked to him about the outside world and together they discussed his plans to overthrow the Rana government. She acted as "the link between the imprisoned King and Indian ambassadors" Surjit Singh Majithia and CPN Singh, helping to coordinate their plans. This included arranging a secret meeting between the King and CPN Singh on a Kathmandu road, with the King dressed in "the dirty linen of a Nepalese peasant."

Her friend Sherene Rustomjee helped by collecting and sending any clippings from the Indian press which referenced the King, Nepal, the Rana dynasty and the Nepalese Congress party.

Leuchtag left Nepal in 1949 and travelled to Simla. After the Ranas were overthrown, Leuchtag returned to Nepal in 1951 where the King was heading a "compromised coalition government". She was the first person to see the written resignation of the Rana prime minister, Mohan Shumsher Jung Bahadur Rana, with the King saying, "I wanted you to be the first to see this."

The King died of heart trouble in Switzerland in 1955 by which time she was living in London. She heard the news "by chance" on the radio.

After moving to London, Leuchtag was licensed as a physiotherapist by the London County Council. In a 1958 interview she asked not to be compared with Anna Leonowens of the King and I fame saying, "Anna did nothing for Siam. But I have helped, in my own way, to bring happiness to Nepal. I try to live democracy – and not talk it."

== Book ==
Leuchtag published her memoir With a King in the Clouds in 1958. In 1957, before the book was completed, the British film rights were optioned by the Rank Organisation and American film rights were sold to Coward McCann. Neither came to fruition. The launch of the book in June 1958 made the front cover of The Bookseller. It was serialized in the Liverpool Echo in August and Leuchtag was interviewed by Edmund Purdom on BBC TV's Late Extra on 12 August. A later edition was called Erika and the King. After the Ranas were successfully overthrown and the Shah dynasty reinstated, her book was banned in Nepal, perhaps due to questions regarding the nature of Leuchtag's relationship with the King.
