= Siegfried Borries =

German violinist and violin educator

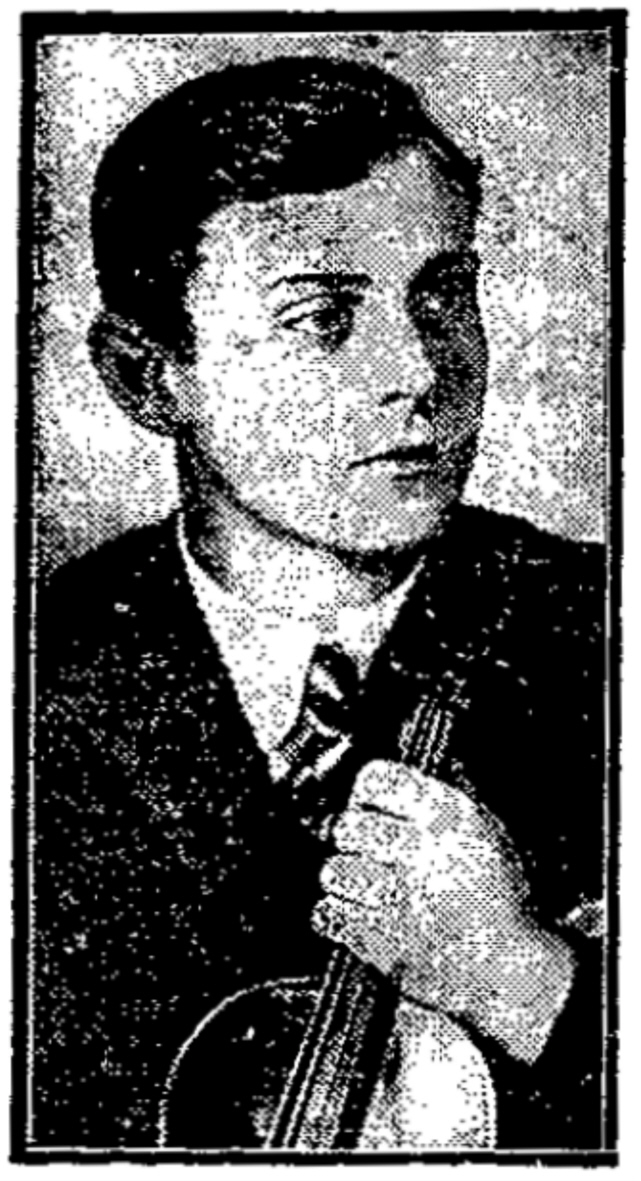
Siegfried Borries

Siegfried Paul Otto Borries (10 March 1912 – 12 August 1980) was a German violinist and violin educator.

== Life ==
After his secondary school leaving certificate and corresponding preliminary studies, Borries studied at the Rheinische Musikschule in the master class of professor Bram Eldering from 1929. At the first International Competition for Voice and Violin in Vienna in 1932, he was the only German among 300 applicants to receive the "Großen Internationalen Preis" and a few months later, in October 1932, also the "Mendelssohn Prize Berlin" from the State Academy of Music in Berlin. At the age of 20, on 1 January 1933, he was appointed 1st concertmaster of the Berlin Philharmonic by Wilhelm Furtwängler. In May 1936, he was awarded the first ever "Musikpreis der Reichshauptstadt Berlin". Also in 1936, he became a teacher at the Stern Conservatory. At the Reich Music Days in the summer of 1939, Borries was awarded the National Music Prize 1939 as the best German violinist of the next generation of soloists. From 1941 to 1945, Borries was special concert master of the Staatskapelle Berlin under Herbert von Karajan's authority.

As a chamber musician, he played from 1933 to 1945 together with his Philharmonic colleagues Heinrich Breiden, flute and Hans Ahlgrimm, 2nd violin in the Borries-Breiden-Ahlgrimm Trio. Borries was listed as an important violinist of the NS State on Goebbels' Gottbegnadeten list.

After the end of the war, in 1945, he took over the master classes for violin at the newly founded "International Music Institute Berlin". He also resumed his position as concertmaster of the Philharmonic Orchestra and became director of its chamber music association. From 1948, he taught violin (since 1949 as professor) at the Berlin University of the Arts and developed in the following years a lively concert activity as soloist and chamber musician in Germany and abroad.

In 1957, due to differences with the Berlin Senate on questions of fees, Borries refused to participate in the orchestra's 75th anniversary concert. He was then placed on leave until his final departure from the orchestra on 31 August 1961.

Borried died in Berlin at the age of 68.

== Prizes ==
- 1932: Internationaler Musikpreis Wien
- 1932: Mendelssohn Scholarship für ausübende Tonkünstler
- 1936: Musikpreis der Stadt Berlin
- 1939: Nationaler Musikpreis für den besten deutschen Geiger des Solistennachwuchses

== Recordings ==
- with the Berliner Philharmoniker on Electrola, the two violin concertos by Ludwig van Beethoven conducted by Johannes Schüler (1939) as well as Mendelssohn's Violin Concerto, Sergiu Celibidache conducting (1948)
- Max Bruch's Concerto No. 1 with the Staatskapelle conducted by Fritz Zaun (1943)
- Radio recording of the Reichs-Rundfunk-Gesellschaft Johannes Brahms' Violin Concerto (1936, Berliner Funk-Orchester conducted by Max Fiedler)
- with Michael Raucheisen as accompanist, the "Spring" Sonata, Op. 24, by Ludwig van Beethoven
- Violin Sonata (Duo), D.574, by Franz Schubert
- Sonatina by Antonín Dvořák, and his Three Romantic Pieces, recordings from the years 1943 and 1944.
- The violin concerto by Ferruccio Busoni (1949, Berlin Philharmonic under Celibidache) has been preserved as a recording by RIAS.
- On the US-Label Urania – with the Sinfonie-Orchester of Radio Berlin directed by Artur Rother – again the violin concerto by Ferruccio Busoni and Richard Strauss's Violin Concerto.
