= Vaghinag Bekaryan =

Armenian pedagogue, poet, and writer

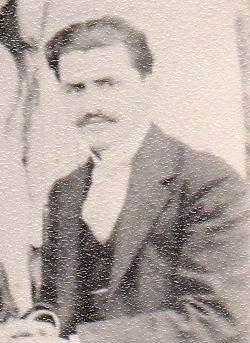
- Born: January 5, 1891; Bardizag, Ottoman Empire (now Turkey)
- Died: June 15, 1975 (aged 84); Yerevan, Armenian SSR, Soviet Union
- Occupations: pedagogue, poet, writer
- Children: Tsolak Bekaryan, Ara Bekaryan

Vaghinag Bekaryan (January 5, 1891 – June 15, 1975) was an Armenian pedagogue, poet, and writer.

== Biography ==
Bekaryan was born in 1891 in Bardizag, Turkey where Armenians had settled. He received his primary education at his local school and later continued in Constantinople's Getronagan Armenian High School. In 1908, after the Ottoman Constitution of 1908, Bekaryan and his wife moved to Afyonkarahisar and the two started teaching at the National Central High School. In 1915, Bekaryan was invited to Jerusalem's Theological Seminary to teach, where his family spent the days of the Armenian genocide. After the Genocide, he taught the refugee Musaler community at Port Said. In 1916, the Ethiopian Armenian community invited Bekaryan to Addis Ababa where he established an Armenian school. In 1922, Bekaryan moved to Paris, and in 1925 he moved to Armenia. Bekaryan graduated from the National Polytechnic University of Armenia from the Faculty of Chemistry. During his studies, he taught in Etchmiadzin, Yerevan's schools and Pedagogical Institute.

== Work ==
The diaspora press published his prose and poetry works. During 1923 to 1924, he was a contributor for "Gotchnak Armenia" and "Haratch" newspapers under the pseudonym, Abel Miachikyan.

- Verses – 1925
- "The Fake Bride" (novelette) 1945, 1963 Yerevan
- "Hell on Earth" (novel) – 1959, Yerevan
- "In Garni", "Teaching Memories", "Childhood Memories" (one book) – 1967, Yerevan
- "You are Innocent" (novelette) – 1970, Yerevan
- "Vagharshapat" (not published)
- "One year in Etchmiadzin" (not published)
