= Lum Loy =

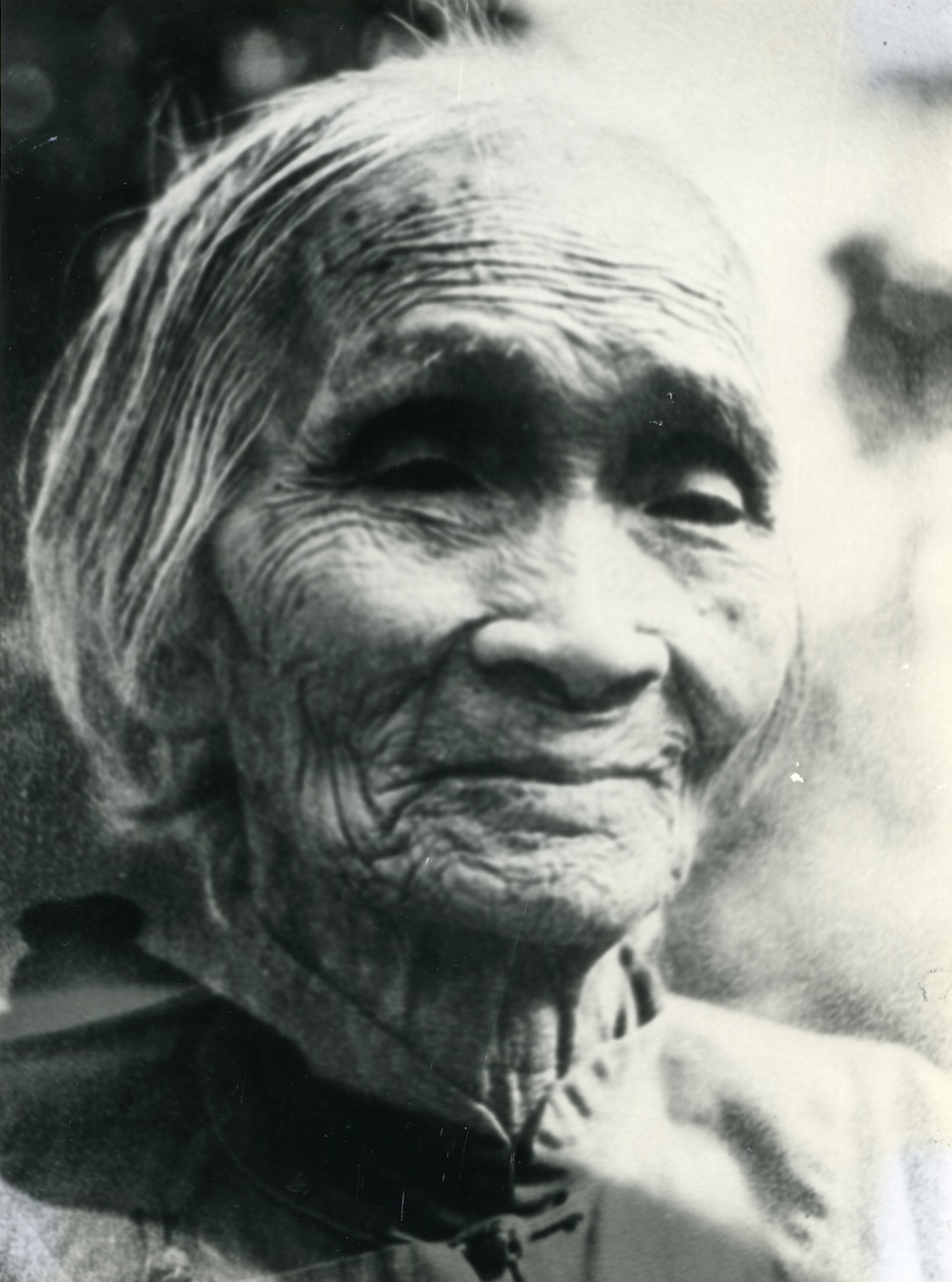
A portrait of Granny Lum Loy

Lum Loy (born Lee Lim See, or Lee Toy Kim; 1884 – 20 August 1980), also known as Granny Lum Loy and Lu Moo, was a Chinese businesswoman in Darwin in the Northern Territory of Australia.

== Early life ==
Loy was born in Shiqi part of Zhongshan in China sometime between 1884 and 1891. She moved to Darwin in 1898, one of two adopted children of Fong Sui Wing. Loy married a mining engineer Lum Loy, and together they moved to Pine Creek. They had one daughter named Lizzie Yook.

== Life in Darwin ==
After the death of her husband in 1918, Lee Toy Kim moved back to Darwin. She established a mango plantation in Fannie Bay. After selling the plantation in 1935, Loy and her daughter ran a cafe in central Darwin. She purchased a block in Stuart Park where she started a chicken farm.

Loy was evacuated to Sydney after the bombing of Darwin by the Japanese in 1942. She returned to Darwin, working a market garden on the Stuart Highway outside Darwin which was later destroyed by Cyclone Tracy.

She is remembered as an elderly lady in traditional Chinese trousers, jacket and hat, who walked each day from Stuart Park to the centre of Darwin and sold produce as the Rapid Creek Markets. She was an active member of the Chinese community and a regular worshiper at the Joss House Chinese temple. A portrait of Loy painted by artist Geoff La Gerche was entered in the Archibald Prize in 1979.

Loy died on 20 August 1980 at the age of 96. Her funeral in 1980 was reportedly one of the biggest and longest in Darwin's history. He great grandson Roland Chin said that "[t]here were people lining the roads to pay respects to her".

She is buried in the Gardens Road Cemetery.

== Legacy ==
Loy is the subject of the song "Granny" by Ted Egan which is on the 2002 album The Drover's Boy - a celebration of Australian women.

Lum Loy Lane in Gungahlin, a suburb in Canberra, was named for her in 2003.
