= Tsolak Bekaryan =

Tsolak Bekaryan Ցոլակ Բեքարյան
- Born: October 30, 1922; Addis Ababa, Ethiopian Empire
- Origin: Armenia
- Died: August 22, 1980 (aged 57) Sortavala, Karelian ASSR, RSFSR, Soviet Union
- Genres: classical music
- Occupation(s): composer, violinist, pedagogue
- Instrument: violin
- Years active: 1945-1980

Tsolak Vaghinag Bekaryan (Armenian: Ցոլակ Բեքարյան; October 30, 1922 – August 22, 1980) was an Armenian composer, violinist, and pedagogue. He was born in Addis Ababa, Ethiopia to educators, Vaghinag and Mari Bekaryan. In 1926, Bekaryan, with his parents, returned to their motherland, Armenia. Bekaryan has written orchestral, instrumental, and vocal compositions. He died in the town of Sortavala in Karelia in Northern Russia (his holiday home).

== Biography ==
- From 1940 to 1942, Bekaryan studied at the State Music College named after Romanos Melikyan
- In 1948, Bekaryan graduated from Komitas State Conservatory of Yerevan from the violin department. In 1960, from the composition department with the guidance of Edvard Mirzoyan.
- During 1945 to 1965, he performed with the Armenian Philharmonic Orchestra
- From 1965 to 1980, Bekaryan taught at Armenian State Pedagogical University

== Compositions ==
External videos
- Tsolak Bekaryan, Parvana - Women's Choir and Chamber Orchestra poem

External videos
- From the works of Tsolak Bekaryan in the archive of the Armenian Radio

- Concerto - string Orchestra
- Rhapsody - Symphony Orchestra
- Suite - folk ensemble
- Festive Overture - violin ensemble and piano
- Characters - piano quintet
- Concerto - for the violin accompanied by the piano
- Poem - for the violin accompanied by the piano
- Suite - for the piano and flute
- Sonata No. 1 - violin solo
- Sonata No. 3 - violin solo
- Fantastic Prelude - piano
- Freedom Song - cantata vocal-symphonic poem
- Alagyaz Mani - cantata reciter, choir, and Symphony Orchestra
- My Luck - voice and chamber orchestra
- Striptease - among the songs of 20th Century Paris
- Parvana - Women's Choir and Chamber Orchestra poem
- Ave Maria - mixed choir poem
- Song of Freedom - for a cantata reciter and mixed choir without accompaniment
- Marine Monastery - for a mixed choir without any accompaniment
- Symphony No. 1 - for a mixed choir without any accompaniment
- Symphony No. 2 - for a mixed choir without any accompaniment

== Publications ==
- Poem for the violin accompanied by the piano, 1971, Yerevan
- Two sonatas for violin solos, 1973, Yerevan
- Оркестровые произведения советских композиторов, Поэма для струнного оркестра, 1976, Moscow
- Романсы композиторов Армении, Моему счастью, 1976, Moscow
- Armenian Composers' Vocal Works, Marine Monastery, 1978, Yerevan
- Ts. Bekaryan, Y. Gevorgyan, solfeggio, 1980, Yerevan
- Violin sonatas, Sonata No. 3, 1983, Yerevan

== Vinyl Records ==
- Violin music. Plays Ruben Aharonyan Tsolak Bekaryan - Sonata No.2 for violin solo. (LP, RP) Melodiya С10 04661 009, 1982
- Choir of the Armenian Choral Society. Conductor Emma Tsaturyan: Tsolak Bekaryan - "Mariné Vancum". Melodiya
- Romances on the lyrics of A. Isahakyan. Melodiya
- Tsolak Bekaryan - "To my destinyz" - Knarik Maluntsyan. Melodiya
