= Ryszard Fandier =

Polish sports shooter

Personal information
- Born: 11 June 1941 Łódź, Poland
- Died: 30 August 1980 (aged 39) Warsaw, Poland

Sport
- Sport: Sports shooting

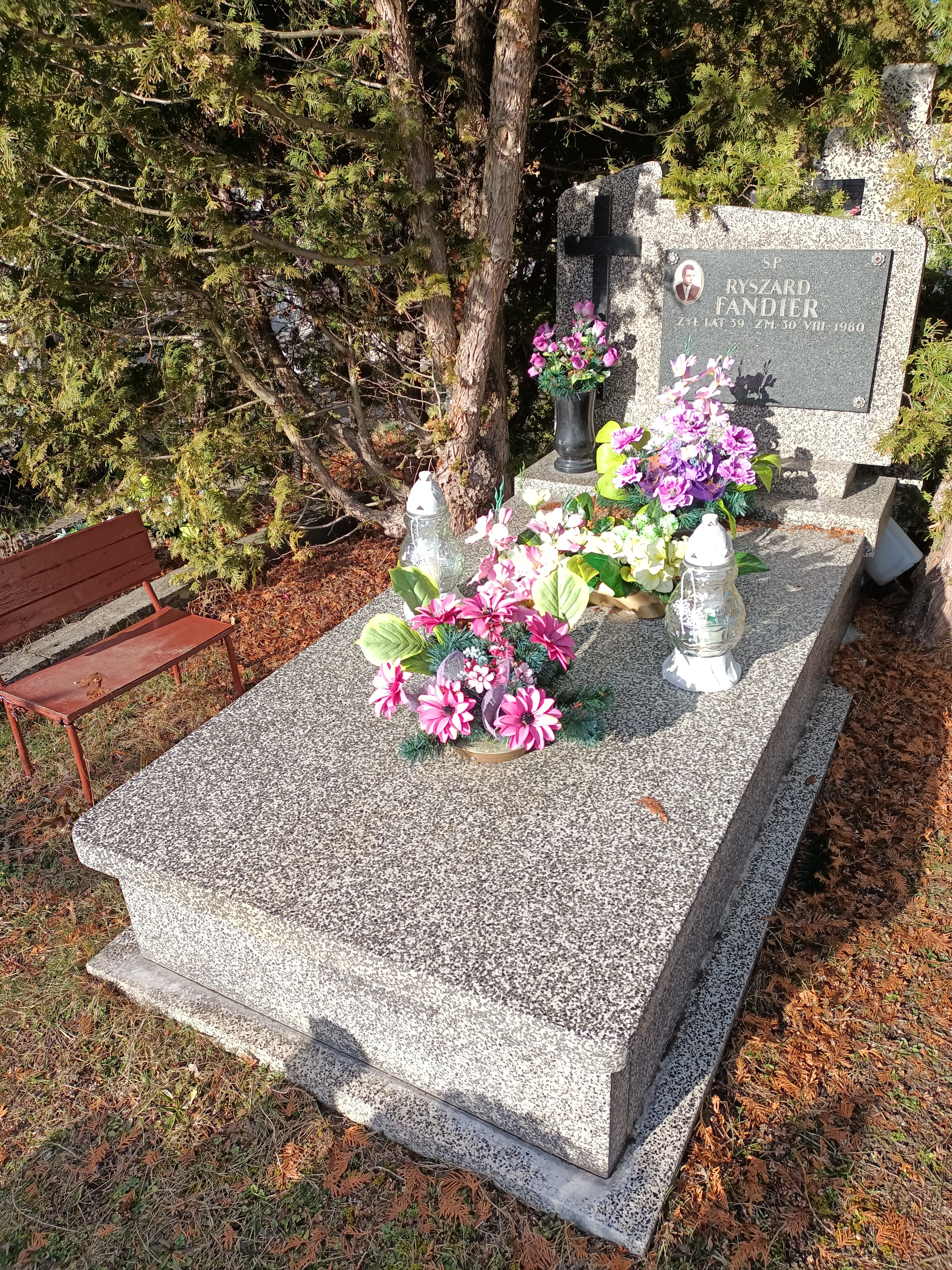
Ryszard Fander's grave at the Northern Municipal Cemetery in Warsaw

Ryszard Fandier (11 June 1941 – 30 August 1980) was a Polish sports shooter. He competed in two events at the 1968 Summer Olympics.
