= William Jaffé =

American economic historian (1898–1980)

- Born: June 16, 1898; Brooklyn, New York, U.S.
- Died: August 17, 1980 (aged 82); Toronto, Canada
- Known for: Scholarship on Léon Walras

Academic work
- Institutions: Northwestern University; York University

William Jaffé (16 June 1898 – 17 August 1980) was an American economic historian. An expert on Léon Walras, he held academic posts at Northwestern University and York University, Toronto.

== Early life and education ==
Born on 16 June 1898 in Brooklyn, New York, he was the son of Russian Jewish immigrants. He attended the City College of New York, graduating with a BA in English in 1918. He then completed an MA at Columbia University in 1919. He intended to study international law and travelled to France in 1921 to study it at the University of Paris (while also learning French). His previous pacifism turned to pessimism when France occupied the Ruhr in 1923 and he abandoned his interest in international law, focusing instead on economics. He completed a PhD in 1924 on Thorstein Veblen.

== Career and honours ==
In 1925, Carlton J. H. Hayes employed him to study the contemporary French economy with William Ogburn; the fruits of their labours were published as The Economic Development of Post-War France in 1929. In 1928, he was appointed an assistant professor at Northwestern University. He left the faculty in 1966 and spent four years occupying temporary teaching positions at the University of California at Riverside, Harvard University and the University of British Columbia. In 1970, he was appointed Professor of Economics at York University in Toronto, a chair which he held for the rest of his life.

Jaffé's friendship with the economist Henry Schultz led him to study the neoclassical economist Léon Walras, who was then largely unknown to American scholars and about whom relatively little had been written. He felt that Walras's ideas could be made more accessible by studying his letters alongside his published work. Jaffé discovered a large collection of Walras's correspondence and papers at the University of Lausanne in 1934 and spent much of the rest of his life editing them for publication and studying Walras. In 1954 his translated edition of Walras's book Elements of Pure Economics appeared in print. His three-volume Correspondence of Léon Walras and Related Papers was published in 1965; it contained 1,900 letters written in four languages over a fifty-year period. At the time of his death, he was preparing a biography of Walras.

In recognition of his accomplishments, Jaffé was elected a fellow of the Econometric Society (1963) and the Royal Society of Canada (1979); he was a foreign member of the Royal Netherlands Academy of Arts and Sciences (1968) and a corresponding fellow of the British Academy (1977). He received an honorary degree and was a Chevalier of the French Legion of Honour. He died in Toronto on 17 August 1980, following surgery for treating cancer. He had married twice; firstly to Grace Mary Spurway in 1922 but the union (which produced three children) ended in divorce; and secondly in 1948 to Olive Caroline Weaver.
