= D. Logan Giffin =

American lawyer and politician

D. Logan Giffin (February 9, 1890 – August 24, 1980) was an American lawyer and politician.

Giffin was born in Macon County, Illinois. He went to the public schools in Argenta and Dalton City, Illinois. In 1911, he graduated from Valparaiso University and was admitted to the Illinois bar. Giffin practiced law in Springfield, Illinois and was a farmer. He served in the Illinois House of Representatives in 1931 and 1932. He also served in the Illinois Senate from 1945 to 1951. Giffin was a Republican. He died in Springfield, Illinois.
