= Aghakhan Aghabeyli =

Aghakhan Alesger oglu Aghabeyli
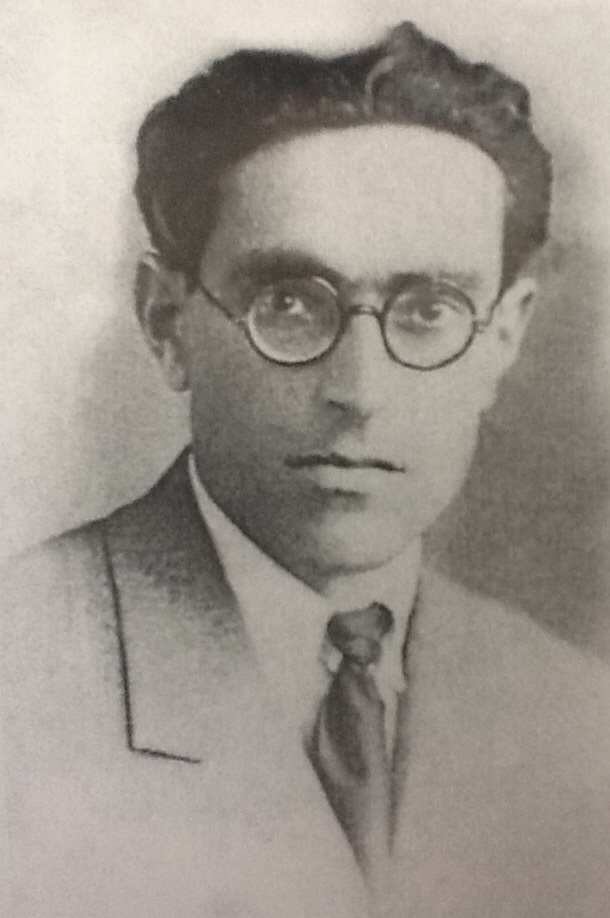
- Born: 22 December 1904; Salyan, Russian Empire
- Died: 20 August 1980 (aged 75)
- Known for: The founder of the doctrine of buffalo breeding.
- Awards: Order of the Red Banner of Labour; Honored Worker of Science of Azerbaijan
- Scientific career
- Fields: Genetics, Selective breeding

Aghakhan Aghabeyli (22 December 1904, Salyan, Russian Empire – 20 August 1980, Baku, Azerbaijan SSR) was an Azerbaijani scientist in the field of genetics and animal breeding, doctor of agricultural sciences, professor, corresponding member of the VASKhNIL (now RAAS - Russian Academy of Agricultural Sciences), honored worker of science of the Azerbaijan SSR. The founder of the doctrine of buffalo breeding.

== Biography ==
He was born in the Kur-Qaraqashli village of Salyan district on December 22, 1904. In 1927 he graduated from the Azerbaijan Polytechnic Institute. In 1930-1932 he was a postgraduate student of the All-Union Institute of Animal Husbandry, a student of the prominent geneticist-breeder A.S. Serebrovsky. In 1956 he was elected a corresponding member of VASKhNIL. In 1932–1966 he worked as a head of Department of Animal Breeding and Genetics of the Azerbaijan Agricultural Institute, and from 1966 to 1980 as a Head of the Department of Genetics and Animal Breeding of the Institute of Genetics and Breeding of the Academy of Sciences of the Azerbaijan SSR. The main works of Aghabeyli are related to the genetics and selection of buffaloes. He was the first to develop the doctrine of buffalo breeding, including genetics and selection of buffaloes, a scientific method for assessing their constitution, breeding techniques, fattening, artificial insemination, immunogenesis, embryogenesis and ecology. Aghabeyli also drew up plans for breeding work and detailed instructions for grading buffalo. Under the guidance of the scientist, a new breed of buffaloes "Caucasian" was bred and the first monographs and textbooks on genetics and selection of buffaloes in the USSR were published.А.А., Агабейли (1967). Буйволы. Moskow: Колос. p. 269. Along with this, A. Aghabeyli laid the foundations for breeding the Azerbaijani mountain merino, as well as crossing zebu with local cattle, in order to breed new hardy and highly productive breeds. The works of A. Aghabeyli on crossing meat breeds of chickens served as the basis for the use of heterosis in poultry farming.

Aghabeyli published more than 200 scientific works, including books and textbooks published in Azerbaijan, Russia, India, Vietnam and other countries. He has prepared more than 50 candidates and doctors of sciences.

== Family ==
It belongs to the famous Aghabeyov family of Salyan. His father was Alasgar Agabeyli, and his mother was Anakhanim Haji Mammad gizi. His daughter Rena Aghabeyli is also a biology specialist and professor.

== Awards ==
Agabeyli was awarded the Order of the Red Banner of Labor and 3 medals of the USSR, the Diploma of the Supreme Council of the Azerbaijan SSR, and was also awarded the title of Honored Worker of Science of Azerbaijan (1964).

== See also ==
- Zemfira Safarova
