= List of judges of the Supreme Court of the Northern Territory =

The Supreme Court of the Northern Territory in Australia has six resident Judges, including a Chief Justice. Judges from other Courts and retired Judges have regularly held appointment as additional or acting Judges to assist, particularly with appeal sittings where at least three Judges are required.

The Northern Territory went through a period where from 1961 up until Self-Government in 1978 Federal Court (and before that Commonwealth) judges were appointed and sat occasionally in the Northern Territory.

Position	Name	From	To	Term	Comments	Notes
Chief Judge	Sir William Forster	1 February 1977	30 September 1979	8 years, 6 days (Note: The title was changed from Chief Judge to Chief Justice on the transfer of the executive authority for the Supreme Court from the Commonwealth to the Northern Territory.)		
Chief Justice	Sir William Forster	1 October 1979	7 February 1985	8 years, 6 days		
Chief Justice	Kevin O'Leary	12 September 1985	31 July 1987	1 year, 322 days		
Chief Justice	Austin Asche	1 August 1987	25 February 1993	5 years, 208 days		
Chief Justice	Brian Frank Martin	26 February 1993	31 October 2003	10 years, 247 days		
Chief Justice	Brian Ross Martin	27 January 2004	20 September 2010	6 years, 236 days		
Chief Justice	Trevor Riley	27 September 2010	4 July 2016	5 years, 281 days		
Chief Justice	Michael Grant	5 July 2016		10 years, 102 days		
Acting Chief Justice	James Muirhead	8 February 1985	11 September 1985	215 days		
Resident Judge	Samuel James Mitchell	30 May 1911	April 1912	307-336 days		
Resident Judge	David Bevan	23 May 1912	22 September 1920	8 years, 122 days		
Resident Judge	Donald Roberts	11 November 1921	7 April 1928	6 years, 148 days		
Resident Judge	Ross Mallam	24 April 1928	1933	4–5 years		
Resident Judge	Thomas Wells	21 August 1933	26 March 1952	18 years, 218 days		
Resident Judge	Martin Kriewaldt	27 March 1952	12 June 1960	8 years, 77 days		
Resident Judge	Alan Bridge	28 September 1961	28 July 1966	4 years, 303 days		
Resident Judge	Richard Blackburn	14 October 1966	27 June 1971	4 years, 256 days		
Resident Judge	Sir William Forster	28 June 1971	31 January 1977	5 years, 217 days		
Resident Judge	James Muirhead	1 May 1974	11 September 1985	11 years, 133 days		
Resident Judge	Richard Ward	27 September 1974	24 November 1977	3 years, 58 days		
Resident Judge	John Toohey	4 April 1977	5 February 1987	9 years, 307 days	Judge of the Federal Court	
Resident Judge	John Gallop	10 March 1978	31 July 2000	22 years, 143 days		
Resident Judge	Sir William Kearney	13 April 1982	13 October 1999	17 years, 183 days		
Resident Judge	John Nader	19 August 1982	19 March 1992	9 years, 213 days		
Resident Judge	Kevin O'Leary	1 July 1983	31 July 1987	4 years, 30 days		
Resident Judge	Michael Maurice	21 September 1984	30 January 1988	3 years, 131 days		
Resident Judge	Phillip Rice	8 March 1985	31 January 1991	5 years, 329 days		
Resident Judge	Austin Asche	14 April 1986	31 July 1987	1 year, 108 days		
Resident Judge	Brian Frank Martin	13 September 1987	25 February 1993	5 years, 165 days		
Resident Judge	David Angel	8 May 1989	18 January 2010	20 years, 255 days		
Resident Judge	Dean Mildren	27 June 1991	28 February 2013	21 years, 246 days		
Resident Judge	Sally Thomas	30 July 1992	7 August 2009	17 years, 8 days		
Resident Judge	Steven Bailey	6 January 1997	25 November 2004	7 years, 324 days		
Resident Judge	Trevor Riley	1 February 1999	26 February 2013	14 years, 25 days		
Resident Judge	Stephen Southwood	31 January 2005		21 years, 257 days		
Resident Judge	Judith Kelly	12 August 2009		17 years, 64 days		
Resident Judge	Jenny Blokland	9 April 2010		16 years, 189 days		
Resident Judge	Peter Barr	30 September 2010		16 years, 15 days		
Resident Judge	Graham Hiley	1 March 2013		13 years, 228 days		
Deputy Judge	Norman Ewing	1919	1920	0–1 years		
Deputy Judge	Gerald Hogan	1920	1921	0–1 years		
Additional Judge	Edward Arthur Dunphy	10 May 1961	30 September 1979 (Note: The effect of the change from a federal court to a territory court was that judges who held commissions as additional judges of the federal court no longer had a court in which to exercise those commissions. Only Justices Franki and Evatt were appointed additional judges in the territory court.)	18 years, 143 days		
Additional Judge	Percy Joske	11 May 1961	1977	15–16 years		
Additional Judge	Sir Reginald Smithers	21 July 1964	1971	6–7 years		
Additional Judge	Charles Sweeney	1967	1970	2–3 years		
Additional Judge	Sir John Angus Nimmo	1969	1974	4–5 years		
Additional Judge	John Kerr	19 September 1970	1972	1–2 years		
Additional Judge	Edward Woodward	25 May 1972	30 September 1979	7 years, 128 days		
Additional Judge	Robert Franki	1972	1986	13–14 years		
Additional Judge	John Sweeney	2 February 1976	30 September 1979	3 years, 240 days		
Additional Judge	Phillip Evatt	5 February 1976	1987	10–11 years		
Additional Judge	Robert St John	22 July 1976	30 September 1979	3 years, 70 days		
Additional Judge	Gerard Brennan	22 July 1976	30 September 1979	3 years, 70 days		
Additional Judge	Trevor Morling	1991; 1994		2–3 years		
Additional Judge	Bill Priestley	1992; 2001	1992; 2002	<1 year 0–1 years		
Acting Judge	Charles Edward Herbert	1921	1922	0–1 years		
Acting Judge	William Henry Sharwood	1922; 1932; 1933		<3 years		
Acting Judge	Donald Gordon Bathgate	1941		<1 year		
Acting Judge	Martin Kriewaldt	1951	1952	0–1 years		
Acting Judge	James Archibald Douglas	1956	1957	0–1 years		
Acting Judge	William Charles Gillespie	1960		<1 year		
Acting Judge	Lawrence Eric Clarke	1960		<1 year		
Acting Judge	James Boyd Keith Williams	1982		<1 year		
Acting Judge	Kevin O'Leary	1982	1983	0–1 years		
Acting Judge	James Muirhead	1987	1988	0–1 years		
Acting Judge	Ian Gray	1991; 1994; 1995; 1998		<4 years		
Acting Judge	Trevor Morling	1997	1998	0–1 years		
Acting Judge	Howard Olney	1998; 2005	2003; 2005	4–5 years <1 year		
Acting Judge	John Gallop	2000	2002	1–2 years		
Acting Judge	John Doyle	2000	2001	0–1 years		
Acting Judge	Robert Brooking	2000	2001	0–1 years	Judge Victorian Court of Appeal	
Acting Judge	Len King	2004	2005	0–1 years		
Acting Judge	Brian Frank Martin	2004		<1 year		
Acting Judge	Trevor Olsson	2004		<1 year		
Acting Judge	Bill Priestley	2006		<1 year		
Acting Judge	Geoffrey Eames	2007	2009	1–2 years	Former judge Victorian Court of Appeal	
