= Jenny Blokland =

Australian judge

The Honourable Justice Jenny May Blokland AO

Judge of the Supreme Court (NT)
- Incumbent
- Assumed office 9 April 2010

Personal details
- Born: Ardrossan
- Education: Modbury High School; University of Adelaide
- Occupation: Judge, lawyer

Jenny May Blokland AO is a judge of the Supreme Court of the Northern Territory, Australia.

== Early life and education ==
Blokland was born in Ardrossan, South Australia, one of two children of Joan and Frank Blokland. Her father was a boilermaker/fitter and turner, while her mother was a legal secretary.

Blokland went to school at Modbury High School in Adelaide before studying at the University of Adelaide, where she graduated with a Bachelor of Laws.

== Career ==
To become a solicitor Blokland needed to complete a period as an articled clerk, which she did at the Northern Territory Department of Law in 1980–1, where she worked with Ian Barker QC. She then worked for the North Australian Aboriginal Legal Aid Service, until 1987, predominantly in criminal and family law. Blokland again studied at the University of Adelaide, obtaining a Master of Laws, before returning to the Northern Territory in 1990. She became a lecturer at the Northern Territory University, in 1996 becoming the Dean of the Law Faculty. In December 1994 Blokland was also appointed as a part-time Judicial Registrar of the Industrial Relations Court of Australia.

Blokland worked at the Office of the Director of Public Prosecutions from 1998 until 2000 when she briefly practiced as a barrister. Blokland then worked at the Department of Justice as Director of Policy, before being appointed as a magistrate to the Magistrates court in 2002, becoming Chief Magistrate in 2006.

=== Supreme Court of the Northern Territory ===
Blokland was appointed to the Supreme Court on 9 April 2010 replacing Justice David Angel, who retired in January 2010. She was the third female appointment to the court since it was established in 1911, following the appointment of Sally Thomas in 1992 and Judith Kelly in 2009. Blokland's appointment to the Supreme Court alongside Kelly meant that for the first time the court had two female judges .

== Awards and recognition ==
Blokland was appointed an Officer of the Order of Australia in the 2024 Australia Day Honours for "distinguished service to the judiciary, to the law, to professional associations, and to the community".
