= Northern Territory v Mengel =

Judgement of the High Court of Australia

- Court: High Court of Australia
- Decided: 19 April 1995
- Citations: [1995] HCA 65, (1995) 185 CLR 307
- Transcripts: 11 Aug 94; 12 Aug 94; 6 Sep 94 [1994] HCATrans 105

Case history
- Prior actions: [1992] NTSC 124, (1992) 109 FLR 411, Supreme Court (NT); [1994] NTSC 37, (1994) 95 NTR 8, Supreme Court (Full Court) (NT)

Court membership
- Judges sitting: Mason CJ, Brennan, Deane, Dawson, Toohey, Gaudron & McHugh JJ

Laws applied
- This case overturned a previous ruling
- Beaudesert Shire Council v Smith [1966] HCA 49, (1966) 120 CLR 145

Northern Territory v Mengel, was a significant Australian court case, decided in the High Court of Australia on 19 April 1995. The decision dealt with the conceptual framework of tort law and held that liability under tort depended on the plaintiff establishing the defendant was either negligent or intended to cause harm to the plaintiff. It overruled the decision in Beaudesert Shire Council v Smith.

== Background ==
=== Facts ===
The Mengel family owned Neutral Station, a cattle station 200 km north of Alice Springs in the Northern Territory. They purchased Banka Banka Station which had slightly better rainfall so they could move cattle there in a drought. One of their heifers had reacted to a test that indicated a possibility that it was infected with brucellosis. Two inspectors from the Northern Territory Department of Primary Industry and Fisheries, as part of a government-sponsored campaign to eradicate brucellosis and tuberculosis in cattle, told the Mengels that there were restrictions on the movement of their cattle which meant they were only able to be moved to an abattoir for slaughter. It was later accepted that there was no statutory or other authority for the acts of the Inspectors.

=== Prior actions ===
In the Supreme Court of the Northern Territory (NT) Asche CJ held that the Mengels were entitled to recover damages for an action on the case based on the decision in Beaudesert, awarding the Mengel family damages of $305,371 plus interest.

The Northern Territory appealed against the decision, while the Megel family cross-appealed against the amount of damages awarded. The Full Court, Priestley J, with whom Angel and Thomas JJ agreed, dismissed the government's appeal and increased the damages to $425,125 plus interest.

== Judgement ==
The majority judgment was that of Mason CJ, Dawson, Toohey, Gaudron & McHugh JJ, holding that the Northern Territory's appeal should be upheld and the Mengel's claim dismissed. Brennan and Deane JJ each gave separate judgments but largely agreed with the majority.

=== Were the Beaudesert requirements satisfied ===
It was held in Beaudesert that "independently of trespass, negligence or nuisance but by an action for damages upon the case, a person who suffers harm or loss as the inevitable consequence of the unlawful, intentional and positive acts of another is entitled to recover damages from that other"

The majority held that claim was not within the Beaudesert principle because :

what happened was that the Inspectors told the Mengels that there were movement restrictions when, in fact and in law, there were none. That did not involve an act forbidden by law in any relevant sense. Nor did it require authority in a way justifying its description as "unauthorized". ... Damage was suffered when the Mengels acted on the basis that their cattle were subject to the movement restrictions communicated to them and, even if it is assumed that that was likely to happen in the ordinary course, there is nothing to suggest that it was bound to happen.

=== Should Beaudesert be overruled ===
The majority reconsidered the decision in Beaudesert and held that it should not be followed because of the:

- lack of authoritative support for the principle';
- difficulties associated with the notions of "unlawful act" and "inevitable consequence";
- further difficulty of reconciling liability under that principle with the limitations upon liability for negligence and for breach of statutory duty; and
- general trend of legal development confining liability to intentional or negligent infliction of harm.

== See also ==
- List of High Court of Australia cases
