= Mengel =

Mengel is a surname. Notable people with the surname include:

- Alex Mengel (1950–1985), Guyanese-born suspected serial killer
- Charles Mengel (born 1933), Australian cricketer
- Christian Gotlob Mengel (1716–1769), Danish publisher, translator and bookseller
- Elisabeth Mengel-Stähle (born 1982), German politician
- Ernest Mengel (1913–1968), Luxembourgian footballer
- Friederike Mengel (born 1979), German economist
- Georg Mengel (1612–1667), German composer
- Hans Mengel (1917–1943), German footballer
- Levi Walter Mengel (1868–1941), American entomologist

== See also ==
- Northern Territory v Mengel, an Australian court case
- Mengele (disambiguation)
