= David Angel =

David Angel may refer to:

- David Angel (judge) (born 1944), judge of the Supreme Court of the Northern Territory, Australia
- David Angel (musician) (born 1940), American musician, arranger, composer, and teacher
- David Angel (academic) (born 1958), president of Clark University, Worcester, Massachusetts

== See also ==
- David Angell (1946–2001), American producer of sitcoms and 9/11 victim
- David Angell (diplomat), Canadian diplomat
