= Harold Snell (Darwin businessman) =

Australian businessman, soldier, miner, producer, carpenter, and builder

Harold Edward George Snell
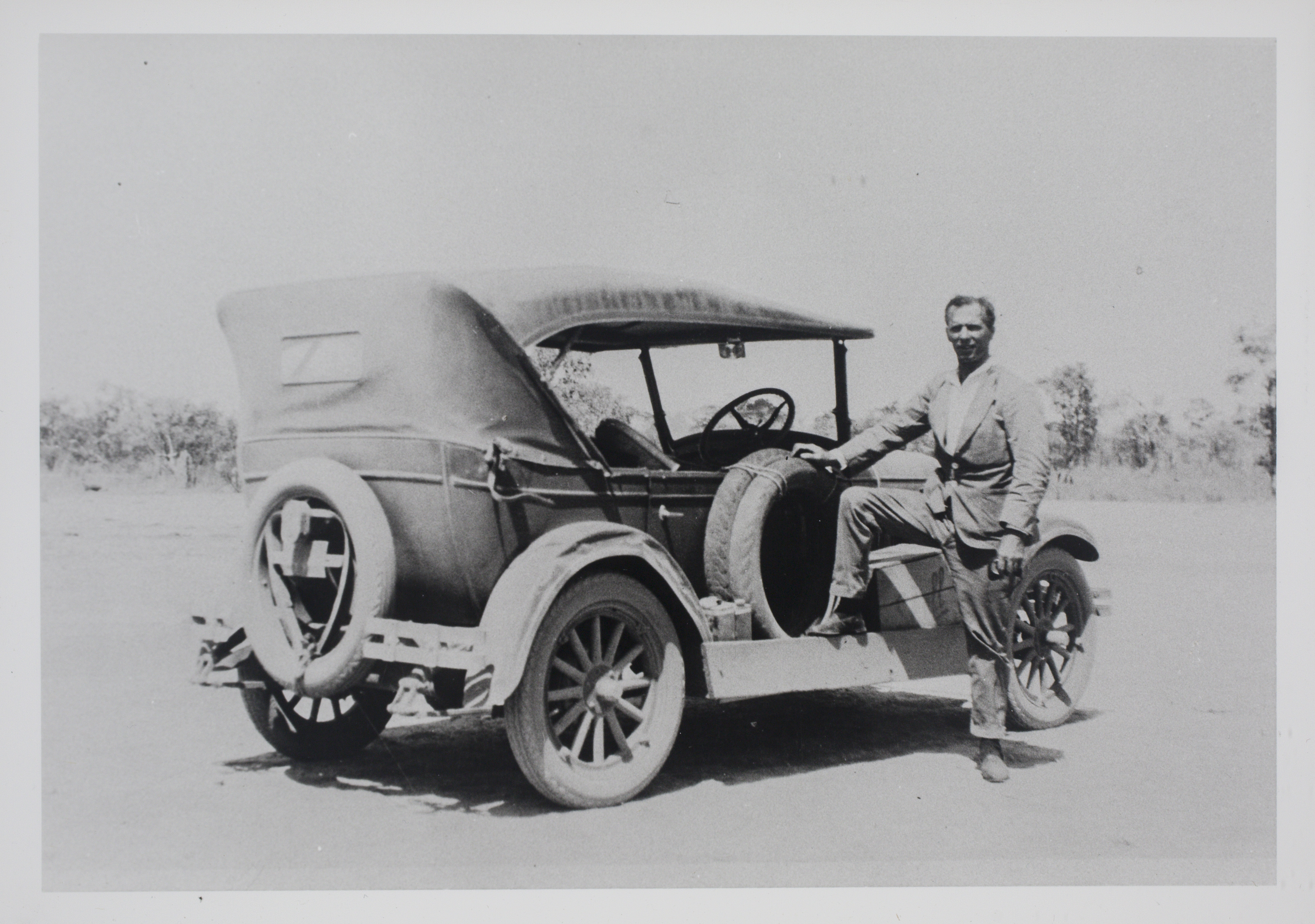
- Harold Edward George Snell with his automobile
- Born: Harold Edward George Snell; 31 January 1892; Victoria
- Died: 16 April 1949 (aged 57); Brisbane, Queensland
- Military career
- Allegiance: Australia
- Branch: Australian Army

Ormond Harold Edward George Snell (31 January 1892 – 16 April 1949), best known as Harold Snell, was a soldier, miner, primary producer, carpenter, builder and businessman in the Northern Territory of Australia. He built many historic buildings in Darwin.

== Early life ==
Snell was born in Glenisla, Victoria on 31 January 1892, the son of Harold Snell and Emily Snell (née Symons) a graziers of Mooralla. His grandfather Richard Snell (1842–1915) and grandmother Lousia Snell (née Lewis), were sheep farmers at Mooralla in the Shire of Dundas. Harold Snell Junior remained on the property until his mother died, when he went to Hamilton, Victoria to train as a carpenter. Snell moved to Darwin in 1912, to work for the Commonwealth Government building houses for public servants at Myilly Point.

=== Mining career ===
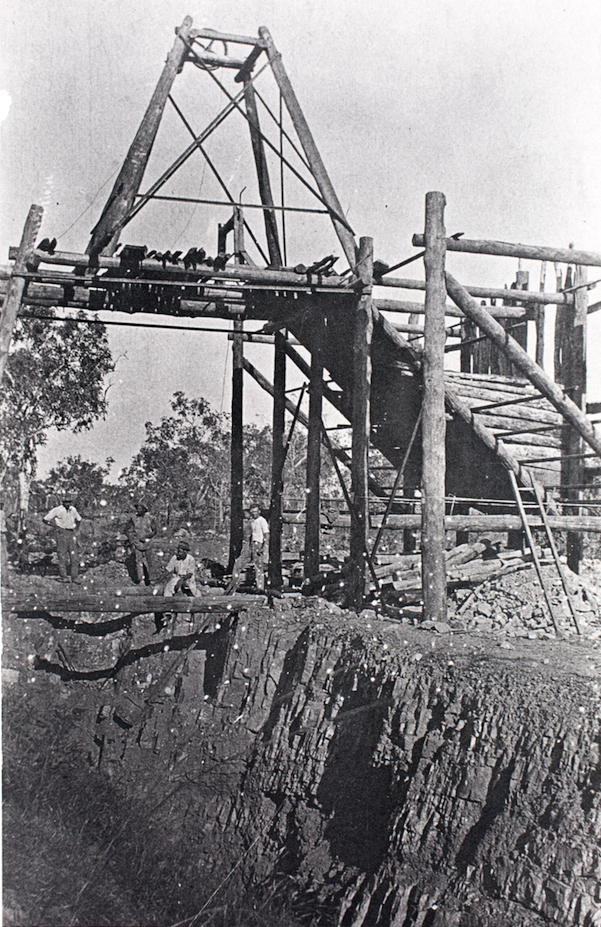
Harold Snell's the tin mine at Maranboy.

After completing work on the Myilly Point houses, Snell took up a mining lease at Maranboy, eight kilometres from where the community of Barunga is today, after the discovery of tin in the region in 1913. He partnered with Pearce and Marshall in the Star of the East tin mine, one of the better known mines in the Northern Territory at the time. After his war service, Snell returned to tin mining at Maranboy later having shares in many mines including Pine Creek Enterprise Gold, Golden Dyke Gold Mine, Eleanor Vendor, Fletcher Gully Gold Mine and Eleanor Gold Mine. All were financially unrewarding for Snell.

== Military service ==
Snell enlisted in Brisbane on 29 November 1915 as a Sapper, serving in the 6th and 4th Regiment of the Australian Imperial Force. He embarked on 31 March 1916. He served in Egypt and France. He was granted leave in the United Kingdom from March to June 1919 where he took on training and ship carpentry for Palmers Shipbuilding and Iron Company, Jarrow. Whilst in the United Kingdom he met and married Ivy Mary Allen on 9 August 1919. Snell and his new wife and child returned to Australia on board the HT Konigin Luise on the 18 December 1919, disembarking on 2 February 1920.

== Construction career and later life ==
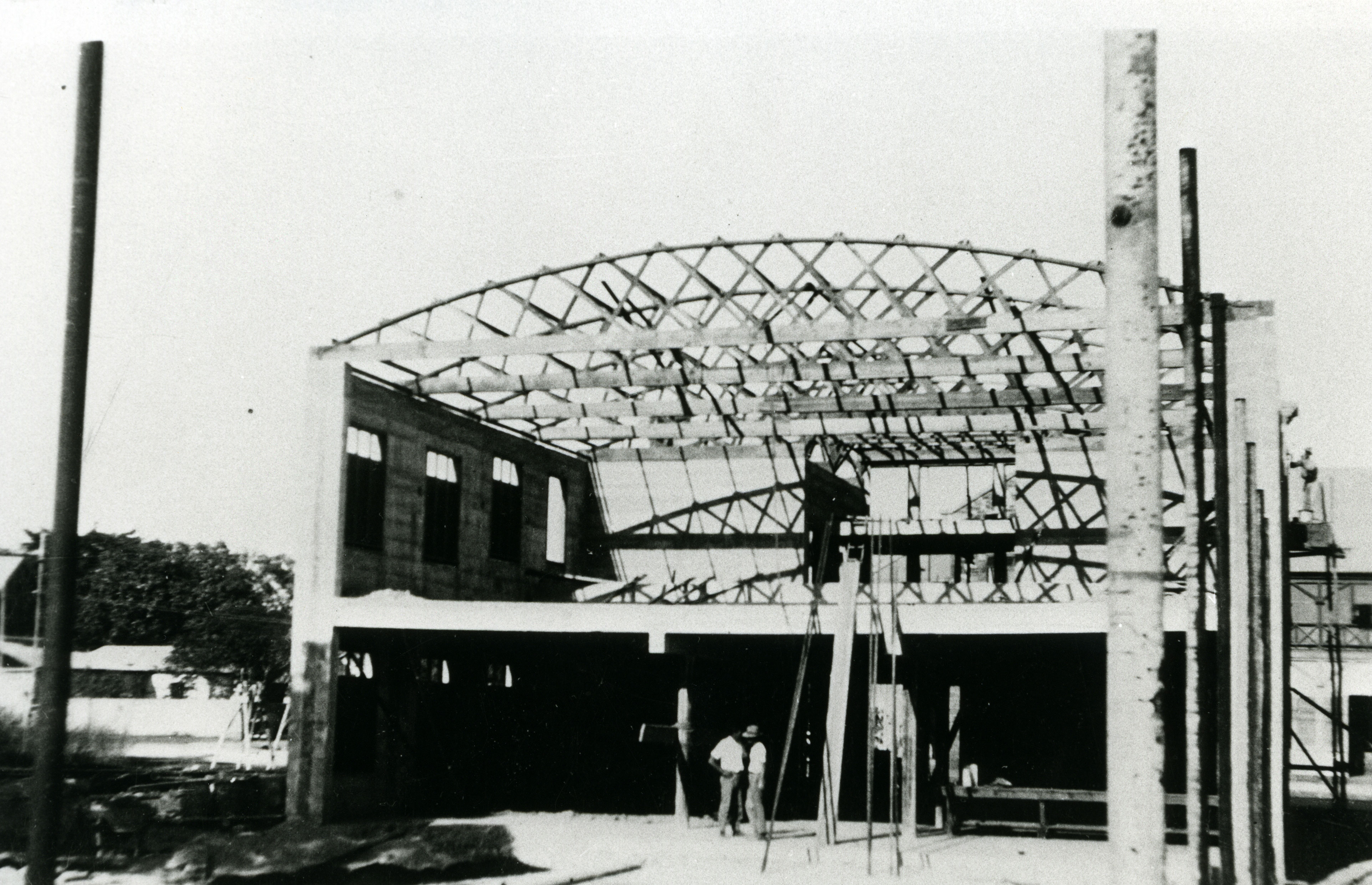
The Star Theatre under construction by Harold Snell.

After the war, Snell returned to the Northern Territory and continued to work on the Maranboy lease. After his wife fell ill, Snell relinquished the partnership with Pearce in 1922 and returned to Darwin. He then bought plant and building equipment, forming a new business relationship with builder James Markey.

His early buildings had a distinctive style in the design with a recognizable second level or raised roof. These included the Soldiers Club Rooms and Memorial Hall on Smith Street and Lyons Cottage for the British Australian Telegraph Company. Snell's own house was built in Mitchell Street opposite the post office. Snell is best known for gradually developing Smith Street, constructing at least 17 buildings there. The Star Theatre had a particularly innovative design to the roof structure which Snell had learnt in England. Snell also constructed the Don Hotel, some of the oil tanks at Stokes Hill and the Katherine Bridge.

With the buildup of troops in the Top End after the outbreak of World War II, Darwin's population doubled between 1936 and 1939. Snell and Company received a significant share of construction work that followed. Snell was interstate at the time of the Bombing of Darwin returning immediately to Darwin. For the remainder of the war he was a works supervisor in the Engineering (Civil) Section of the Works and Services Branch of the Allied Works Council.

Snell lived in Darwin for the remainder of his life. He died on 16 April 1949 in a Brisbane hospital from pleurisy and pneumonia.

Harold and Ivy had eight children but only five survived. Some still reside in Darwin including daughter Valerie Fletcher, an author and historian. She wrote a family history of Harold Snell in 2016. Snell's granddaughter Judith Kelly is a Justice of the Supreme Court of the Northern Territory.

Snell has a street named after him in Winnellie, Darwin.
