= Dean Mildren =

Australian judge

Dean Mildren AM RFD KC (born 27 February 1943) is a former judge of the Supreme Court of the Northern Territory. He was appointed to the court on 27 June 1991, and retired February 2013. He was sworn in as an acting judge of the court soon after and served in that capacity until 2021.

== Early life and education ==
Mildren was born in Adelaide, South Australia, and attended the Norwood High School and the University of Adelaide. He graduated with a Bachelor of Laws and Bachelor of Arts and from 1966–68 was an Articled Clerk to James Henry Muirhead who was later to become a Judge of the Supreme Court of the Northern Territory.

Mildren was a solicitor with Thomson & Co in Adelaide from 1968–71.

== Legal work in the Northern Territory ==
Mildren relocated to the Northern Territory in 1972 and established the firm Mildren & Partners in which he practised as a barrister & solicitor.

Mildren practised as a barrister from 1980 until his appointment to the bench in 1991. He was appointed as a King's Counsel in 1983 and was President of the Northern Territory Bar Association from 1987–91 having been Vice-President from 1989–90. During his time on the bench, he was the judge responsible for giving confessed child-rapist Brett Peter Cowan the "benefit of any doubt" and a short sentence in his second conviction as a sex offender, despite expert recommendation against the man who had been found guilty of abducting and carrying out an anal rape, torture, and strangulation of a 6-year-old boy in such violent fashion that outcry witnesses initially thought the child had been hit by a car. The judge's justification for the short sentence was that the pedophile had made a "fairly spontaneous indication to the police that he needs help," with the criminal's lies about intent during the assault and consciousness of guilt after it given more credence than the psychologist who questioned whether Cowan was even capable of the emotion of remorse. After his release, Cowan would go on to offend again, abducting and this time murdering 13-year-old Daniel Morcombe in 2003. However, it is the matter of mandatory sentencing for murderers that Mildren considers "unjust and unfair." He also worries about conditions child rapists might experience in hot, overcrowded prisons, which was his reasoning for shorter sentences given to other sex offenders for crimes reaching back into the 1980s, though how prison maintenance related to sentencing guidelines under the law was unclear.

Mildren was President of the Northern Territory Law Society from 1973–75 and 1979–81. He was also Deputy Chairman of the Northern Territory Legal Practitioners Complaints Committee from 1983–88, Chairman of the Northern Territory Planning Appeals Committee from 1979–85, Chairman of the Northern Territory Council of Law Reporting from 1993–95 and President of the Northern Territory Law Reform Committee from 1991–97. He is a life member of the Criminal Lawyers Association of the Northern Territory.

In 2011, Mildren published a history, Big Boss Fella All Same Judge – A History of the Supreme Court of the Northern Territory. Mildren is also the author of the legal text The Appellate Jurisdictions of the Courts in Australia (2015, The Federation Press).

Mildren was a colonel in the Australian Army Legal Corps from 1992–96, after being a lieutenant colonel from 1980–92. He was a Judge Advocate from 1986–96 and was a Defence Force Magistrate from 1986–91. Justice Mildren was also the Chief Legal Officer of the 7th Military District from 1975–86. Mildren has been a Member of the Defence Force Discipline Appeal Tribunal since 1996.

== Other interests ==
Mildren lectures part-time at Charles Darwin University having been appointed as an adjunct professor of the University in 1997. He has been a Life Member of the Australian Centre of International Arbitration since 1986 and is a Patron of the Friends of the Territory Wildlife Park. He is also a Patron of the Dante Alighieri Society in Darwin and Vice-Patron of the Darwin Cricket Club.
