= Mud Hut (Knight's Folly) =

Coordinates: 12°28′04″S 130°50′41″E

The Mud Hut was the name of an historic building in Darwin in the Northern Territory of Australia. It was officially known as Aspendale and by derogatory name of Knight's Folly. It was located between Hughes Avenue and Kitchener Drive on the escarpment below Darwin and is now a symbol of innovative tropical architecture.

== Construction ==
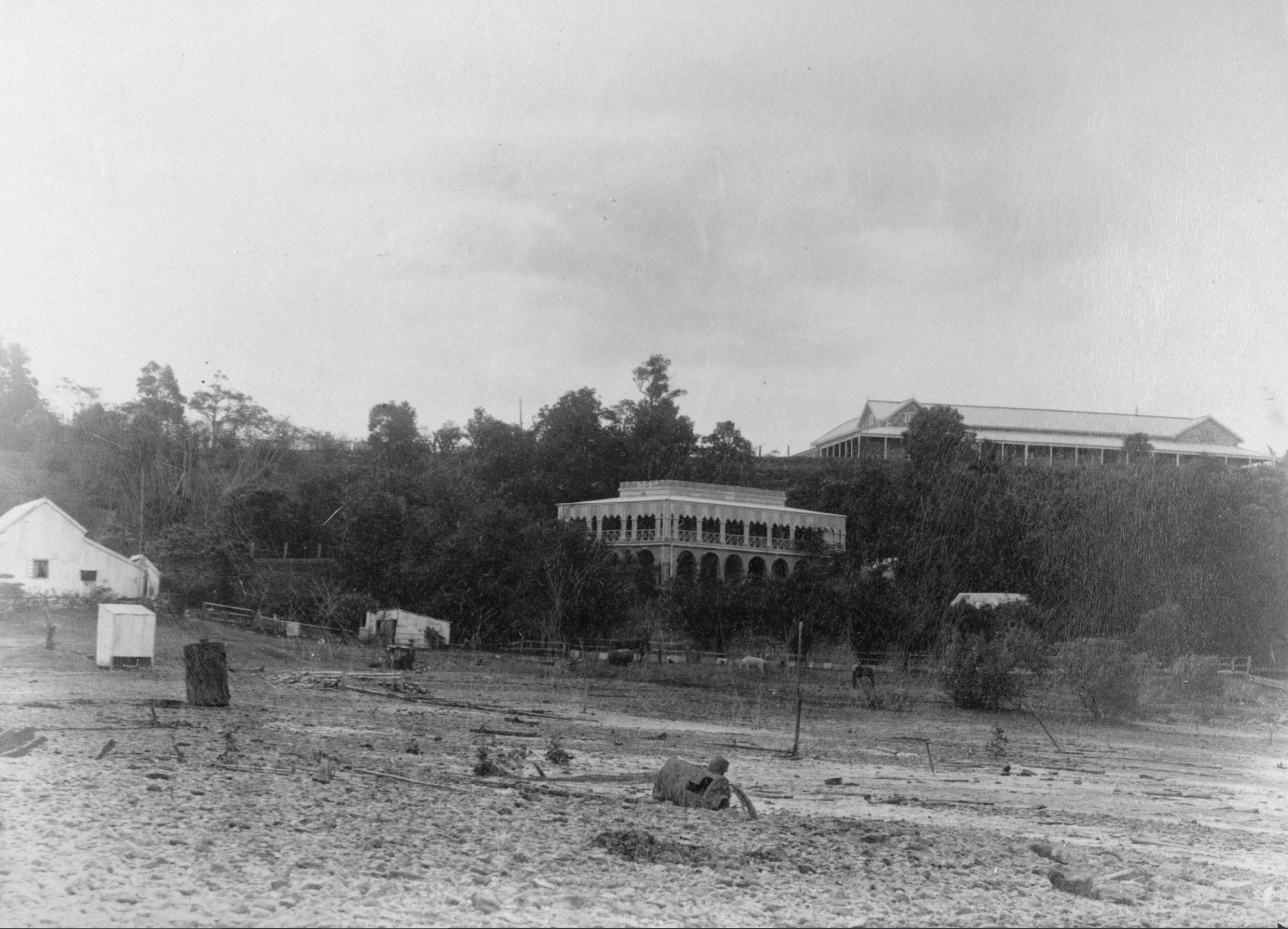
View from beach of 'Mud Hut' or Knight's Folly.

The Mud Hut was constructed in 1883 by John George Knight, an architect and the Government Resident of the Northern Territory from 1890 to 1892. Built from 'Egyptian bricks', it was two storeys, was the width of one room and featured large verandahs.

Residents	Year
R. T. Green	1893
Colonel Charles Barnett Story	1924
Eric Thomas & Beryl Asche and family	1933

== Destruction ==
The Mud Hut burnt down on the 31 Dec 1933. It was unoccupied at the time, as residents Eric Thomas Asche and his family, including son Austin Asche, were on holidays. Evidence given at an inquiry was insufficient in proving the cause or origin of the fire but eventually the "defective state of the electric lighting" was blamed.

The only visible remains today are a set of concrete stairs and an information panel.

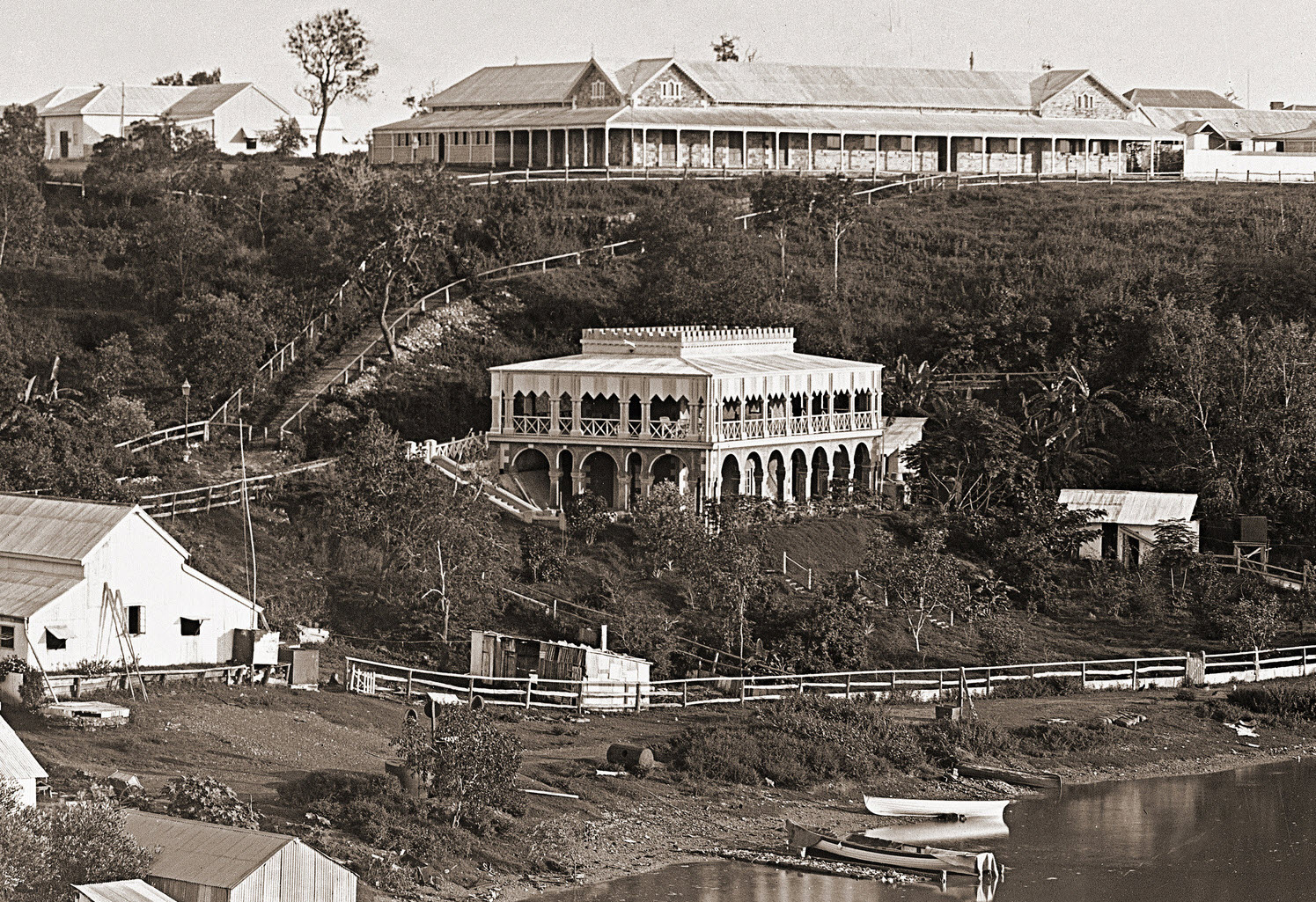
Mud Hut also Known as Knight's Folly in Darwin taken in 1902.
