= James Muirhead (judge) =

Australian judge (1925–1999)

The Honourable James Muirhead AC KStJ QC
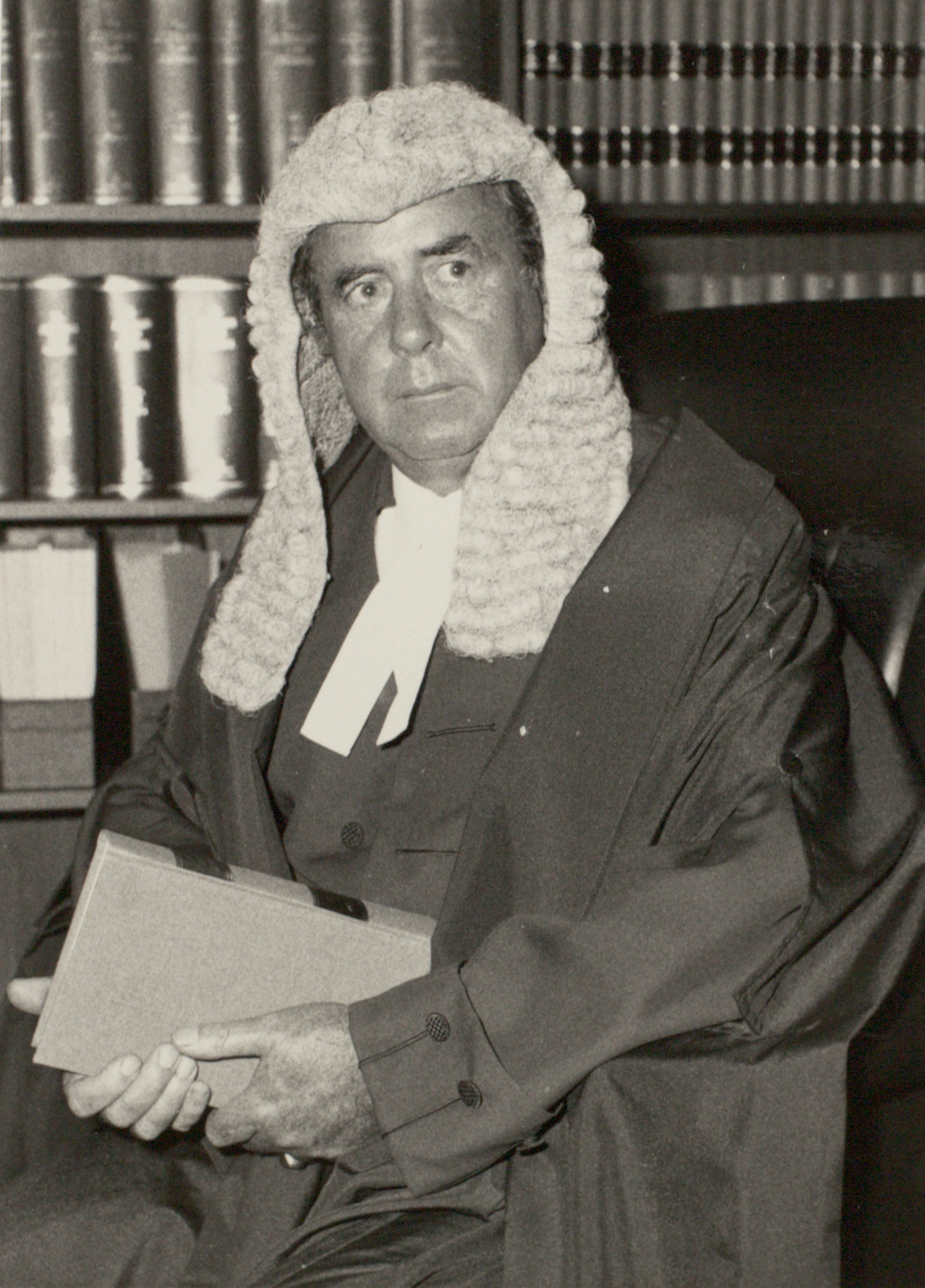

Administrator of the Northern Territory
- In office 1 July 1989 – 1 March 1993
- Preceded by: Eric Johnston
- Succeeded by: Austin Asche

Personal details
- Born: James Henry Muirhead; April 24, 1925 Adelaide, South Australia
- Died: July 20, 1999 (aged 74) Darwin, Northern Territory

Military service
- Allegiance: Australia
- Branch/service: Second Australian Imperial Force
- Battles/wars: Second World War; Bougainville campaign; New Britain campaign

James Henry Muirhead AC KStJ QC (24 April 1925 – 20 July 1999) was an Administrator of the Northern Territory and a Judge of the Supreme Court of the Northern Territory.

== Pre-Northern Territory ==
Muirhead was born in Adelaide and was educated at St Peter's College and the University of Adelaide. After completing high school he enlisted in the Second Australian Imperial Forces for service in the Second World War. From 1943–1946 he served as an infantryman and signaller with the 57/60 Battalion in Bougainville and later with the 37/52 Battalion in Rabaul, New Britain.

He obtained a Bachelor of Laws from the University of Adelaide and was admitted to the South Australian Bar in 1950. He practised as a barrister and solicitor in the firm of Thomson & Co until 1970 when he was appointed a Judge of the Local and District Criminal Court of South Australia. He was appointed a Queen's Counsel in 1967. Current Judge Dean Mildren was his Articled Clerk from 1966–1968.

He was appointed an Acting Judge of the Supreme Court of Papua New Guinea in 1972. He was appointed in 1973 as the inaugural Director of the Australian Institute of Criminology, a position he held until 1975.

== Northern Territory and beyond ==
He was appointed a Judge of the Supreme Court of the Northern Territory on 1 May 1974 and became the second resident Judge (with William Forster). Later that year Dick Ward would be appointed the third resident Judge. When the Federal Court of Australia was established in 1976 he was appointed a Judge of that Court and held both that commission and the Supreme Court commission concurrently.

After Sir William Forster retired on 7 February 1985 he was appointed acting Chief Justice until his retirement on 11 September 1985 when Kevin O'Leary succeeded him.

He relocated to Perth, Western Australia and resigned his commission as Federal Court Judge in 1986 to take up the position of Royal Commissioner for the Royal Commission into Aboriginal Deaths in Custody, which ran from 1987 to 1991, with hearings finishing in 1989. On 1 July 1989 he was appointed Administrator of the Northern Territory, a position he held until 4 December 1992.

As Administrator he opened the new Supreme Court Building in 1991. At that time he was patron of 74 organisations. He was Deputy Prior of the Order of St John, Chief Scout in the Northern Territory and chairman of the Forum for Indigenous Studies at the North Australia Research Unit. He was also the second honorary colonel of Norforce.

== The Chamberlain Trial ==
Muirhead presided over Australia's most famous criminal murder trial, that of R v Chamberlain & Chamberlain, when Lindy and Michael Chamberlain were charged with the murder of their daughter Azaria. He sentenced Lindy to life imprisonment on 29 October 1982. In the 1988 film Evil Angels, which was based on the events surrounding the trial, Muirhead was portrayed by the actor Charles 'Bud' Tingwell.

== Honours ==
In 1989 he was appointed a Knight of Grace of the Order of St John, and on Australia Day 1991 was awarded Australia's highest civil honour when he was invested as a Companion of the Order of Australia for public service and service to the law.

After he retired he was appointed a Ministerial Adviser to the Council on Veterans Issues, a position he held from 1993–1994.

Muirhead died on 20 July 1999 while visiting family in Darwin.

Government offices
Preceded by Eric Eugene Johnston	Administrator of the Northern Territory; 1989–1992	Succeeded by Austin Asche
