= Brian Frank Martin =

Australian judge (1936–2023)

Brian Frank Martin AO MBE KC (2 November 1936 – 24 April 2023) was the fourth Chief Justice of the Supreme Court of the Northern Territory. He was appointed to that position on 26 February 1993 when the former Chief Justice Austin Asche took up appointment as Administrator of the Northern Territory. Chief Justice Martin was appointed a Judge of the Court in 1987 and, following his retirement, still assisted the Court as an Acting Judge having been appointed to that position in 2004.

He was unusually succeeded as Chief Justice by a person bearing the same first name and surname, Justice Brian Ross Martin. The two men are distinguished by their middle names. The judgments of the latter appear as Martin (BR) CJ to eliminate confusion.

== Education and pre-Northern Territory ==
Chief Justice Martin was born in Lithgow, New South Wales, in 1936 and attended the Lithgow High School. He commenced studying law in 1953 and was admitted to practice in 1959. He practised as a solicitor in Sydney from 1959 to 1963.

== Legal career ==
In pursuit of establishing a country law practice, he moved to Alice Springs in 1963 and, along with Ian Barker, was one of only two solicitors in the town at that time. Together they established the firm of Martin and Barker. He was to stay at Alice Springs until 1981. While there he was appointed to the Alice Springs Town Management Board and served there from 1968 - 1971. He also served terms as alderman, deputy mayor and mayor between 1972 and 1975. He was an inaugural member of the Northern Territory Law Society when it was formed in 1968 and was the Alice Springs representative from 1970 to 1977 and its vice-president from 1972 to 1973.

In 1978 Martin chaired a committee established by the new Northern Territory Government to inquire into the welfare needs of the Northern Territory. In 1980 he was appointed to chair a committee of inquiry into pastoral land tenure in the Northern Territory. He was also appointed that year to the board of directors of the Australian Bicentennial Authority and was chairman of the Northern Territory Council of the Authority until 1989.

Martin was appointed Northern Territory solicitor-general and secretary of the Department of Law in 1981 and relocated to Darwin. In 1982 he was appointed a Queen's Counsel and was appointed a Member of the Order of the British Empire in the 1981 Birthday Honours.

He resigned as secretary of the Department of Law on 3 May 1986 but stayed on as solicitor-general until he was appointed a judge of the Supreme Court of the Northern Territory on 30 September 1987.

He was appointed an Officer of the Order of Australia in 1989.

As chief justice he was a strong defender of the independence of the judiciary and was an even stronger supporter of the Independent Bar. He was the first Northern Territory Chief Justice to use technology such as the internet to display sentencing remarks. He also oversaw the introduction of videoconferencing and implemented the first regular sittings of the Court at Katherine.

During his time as Chief Justice he was Chairman of the Northern Territory Parole Board and held a commission as Acting Administrator of the Territory.

He retired on 31 October 2003, dying on 24 April 2023.

Legal offices
Preceded by Austin Asche	Chief Justice of the Northern Territory; 1993 - 2003	Succeeded by Brian Ross Martin
