= Judith Kelly =

Australian judge

The Honourable Justice Judith Clair Kelly AO

Judge of the Supreme Court (NT)
- Incumbent
- Assumed office 12 August 2009

Personal details
- Born: Judith Clair Fletcher
- Spouse: Matthew Kelly
- Children: Jack Kelly
- Education: University of Queensland
- Occupation: Judge, lawyer, school teacher

Judith Clair Kelly AO is a Judge of the Supreme Court of the Northern Territory (Australia). She was appointed to the Court on 12 August 2009. Justice Kelly was only the second female appointment to the Court since it was established in 1911.

== Early life and education ==
Kelly was born in Queensland, daughter of Colin and Valerie Fletcher and granddaughter of Ivy and Harold Snell. She obtained a Diploma in Education and worked as a school teacher, where she married Matthew Kelly. They moved to the Northern Territory in 1977 working at the Batchelor Area School, Batchelor. In 1983 Kelly started studying law at the University of Queensland, graduating in 1983 with a Bachelor of Laws with Honours.

== Career ==
Kelly returned to the Northern Territory to work as a solicitor with the law firm Morris, Fletcher and Cross in Darwin and she became a partner with the firm in 1990. As a solicitor her principle practise was in commercial litigation practise, banking and insolvency, insurance, construction and admiralty law. Kelly became a barrister in July 1996, at William Forster Chambers, where she predominantly practised in commercial law, contract, partnership, building, property, tax and insolvency. Kelly was appointed as a Senior Counsel in 2008, the first in the new system which replaced the appointment of Queen's Counsel.

=== Supreme Court ===
Kelly was appointed a judge of the Supreme Court of the Northern Territory on 12 August 2009, replacing Justice Sally Thomas. As a judge Kelly has sat on a wide range of cases, including sentencing Joachim Golder to life imprisonment for a "cowardly and vicious attack" in beating his wife to death, and awarding damages, including aggravated damages to inmates of the Don Dale Youth Detention Centre for assault and battery by officers at the centre, including the use of CS gas, shackles, spit hoods and handcuffs without lawful justification.

In October 2018 Kelly was elected as the President of the Judicial Conference of Australia.

Kelly was appointed an Officer of the Order of Australia in the 2024 Australia Day Honours for "distinguished service to the judiciary, to the law, to professional associations, and to women".
