= Legal Profession Admission Board =

New South Wales board for admission of lawyers

The Legal Profession Admission Board is the statutory authority responsible for the admission of lawyers in New South Wales. It was formerly two separate boards; the Barristers Admission Board and the Solicitors Admission Board. The Legal Profession Act 1993 introduced common admission for both branches of the profession resulting in the merger of the two boards.

The board has responsibility for accrediting academic and practical legal training courses leading to admission as a lawyer. The board is also tasked with the responsibility of ensuring that candidates for admission are of good character. In addition to accrediting University courses, the board also conducts examinations leading to a Diploma in Law. The board's Diploma is the equivalent of an accredited law degree and satisfies the academic requirements for admission to the profession. This course is the oldest law course in Australia, dating back to 1848.

== Notable alumni ==
- Former Chief Justice Susan Kiefel of the High Court of Australia
- Former Justice Michael McHugh of the High Court of Australia
- Victor Dominello NSW Finance minister
- Ian Barker, barrister and former NSW Chair of the Bar Association
- John Abernethy Former State Coroner for NSW
- Reginald Marr Solicitor-General for NSW
- David Opas Assassinated Family Court judge
- Rear Admiral Harold Farncomb, navy officer
- John Purdy, Family court judge, chess player
- Kevin Rozzoli, Speaker of the Legislative Assembly of NSW
- Lionel Murphy, Attorney-General of Australia
- Bronwyn Bishop

Justice Stephen Campbell, NSW Supreme Court Justice Carolyn Simpson, NSW Supreme Court Justice Geoffrey Bellew NSW Supreme Court Justice Robert Hulme, NSW Supreme Court Justice Peter Hamill, NSW Supreme Court
