= Lyons Cottage =

Coordinates: 12°27′52″S 130°50′23″E

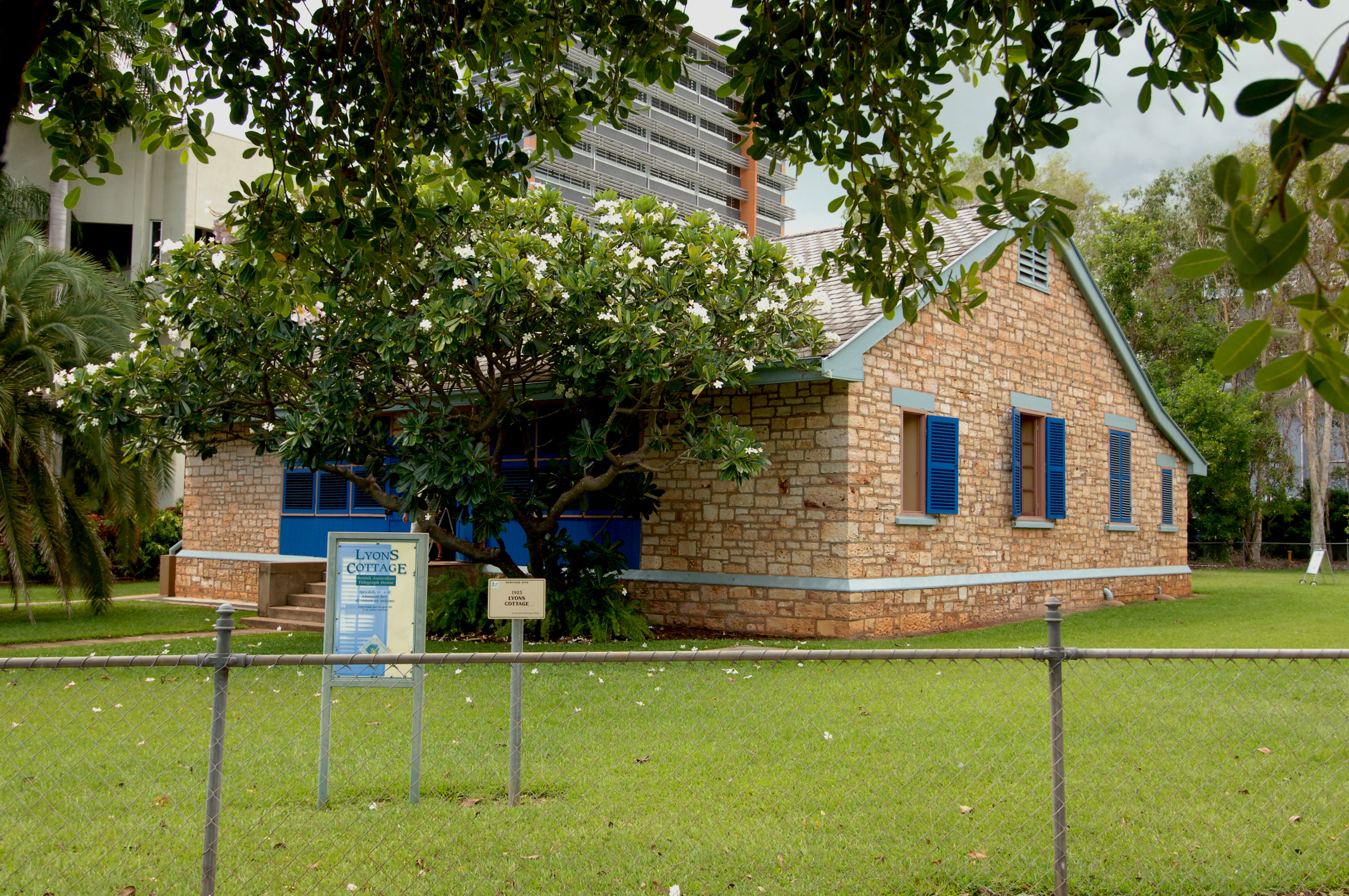
Lyons Cottage, on the corner of The Esplanade and Knuckey Street, Darwin City, Northern Territory, Australia.

Lyons Cottage, as so known as British Australian Telegraph Company Residence, is one of the oldest remaining heritage buildings in the central business district in Darwin City in the Northern Territory of Australia.

== Early history ==
Also known as BAT House, Lyons Cottage was built by Harold Edward George Snell in 1925 as accommodation for staff of the “Eastern Extension Australasia and China Telegraph Company,” better known as British Australia Telegraph, who operated the underwater cable connecting Australia to Britain. Its construction followed the completion of the Overland Telegraph Line in 1872 which linked Adelaide to Darwin and then onto London via an underwater cable to Java. This ended Australia’s isolation from the outside world, and a letter that once physically took three months to travel from London to Sydney via ship, could be telegraphed in less than seven hours using the Overland Telegraph Line. A number of cable company managers, engineers and their families occupied the cottage.

== Architecture ==
Located on The Esplanade overlooking Darwin Harbour, the stone cottage is constructed of locally quarried porcelanite stone. It is the only remaining example of colonial bungalow architecture left in Darwin. It features shuttered windows and high ceilings, similar to the distinctive architectural style of British colonial dwellings in India, Malaysia and Singapore.

== World War II and after ==
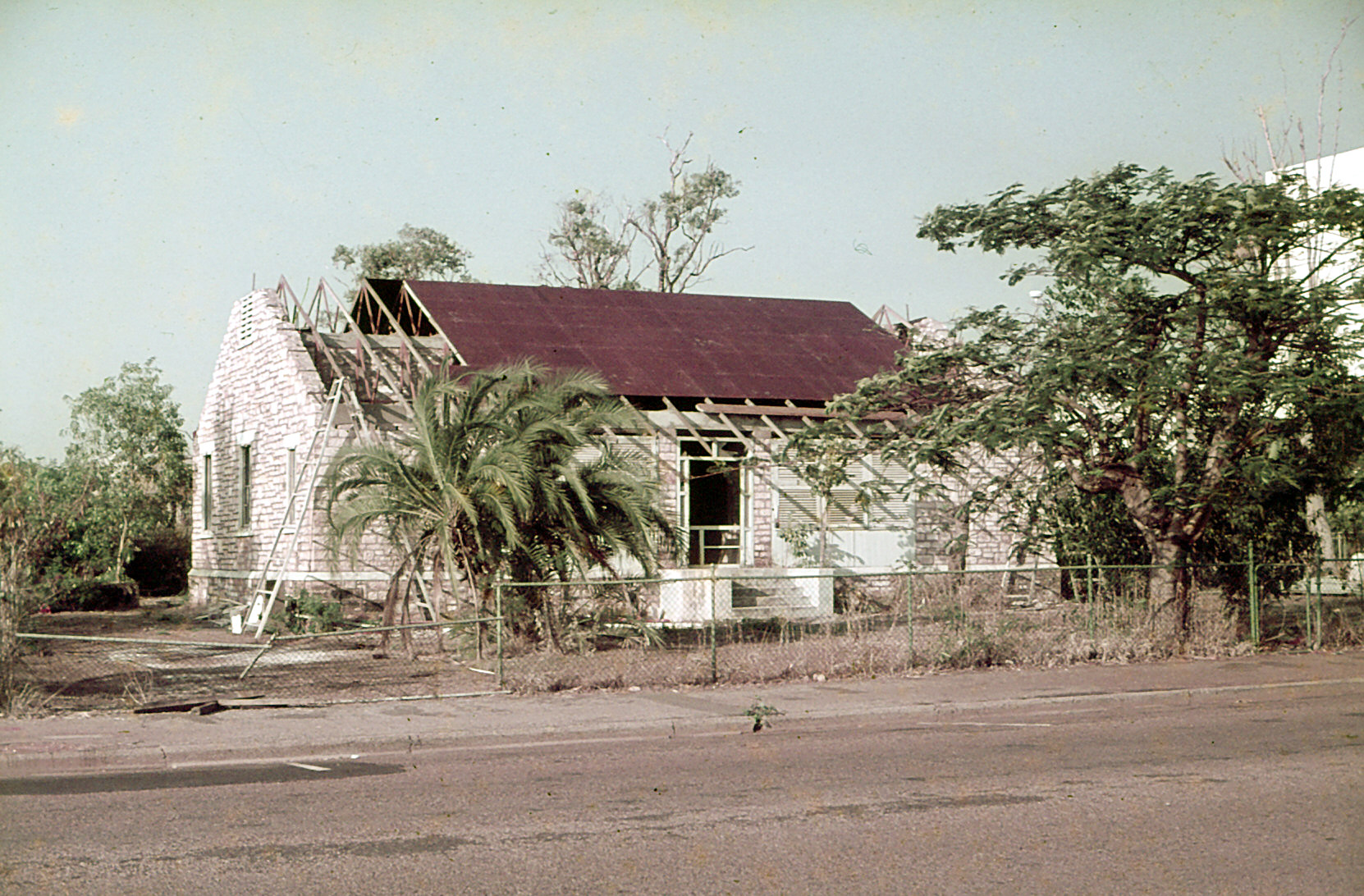
Lyons Cottage Circa 1978. Lyons Cottage was damaged in Cyclone Tracy in 1974. Reconstruction work commenced in 1978.

During World War II the house was occupied by the US Army and later the Royal Australian Navy and survived the Japanese raids of 1942 and 1943 which destroyed much of Darwin. The cottage was then leased and later purchased by a lawyer named John Lyons and his family from which the cottage takes its name. Lyons became the Mayor of Darwin in 1959 and was subsequently elected to the Northern Territory Legislative Council where he remained until 1968.

The cottage lost its roof during Cyclone Tracy in 1974. The building was listed on the now-defunct Register of the National Estate on 26 March 1985 and on the Northern Territory Heritage Register on 4 August 1993. Lyons Cottage is now under management of the House of Darwin and operates as a cafe, On Country Club and head office.
