= Eric Johnston (NT Administrator) =

Australian naval officer

Commodore Eric Johnston AO, OBE
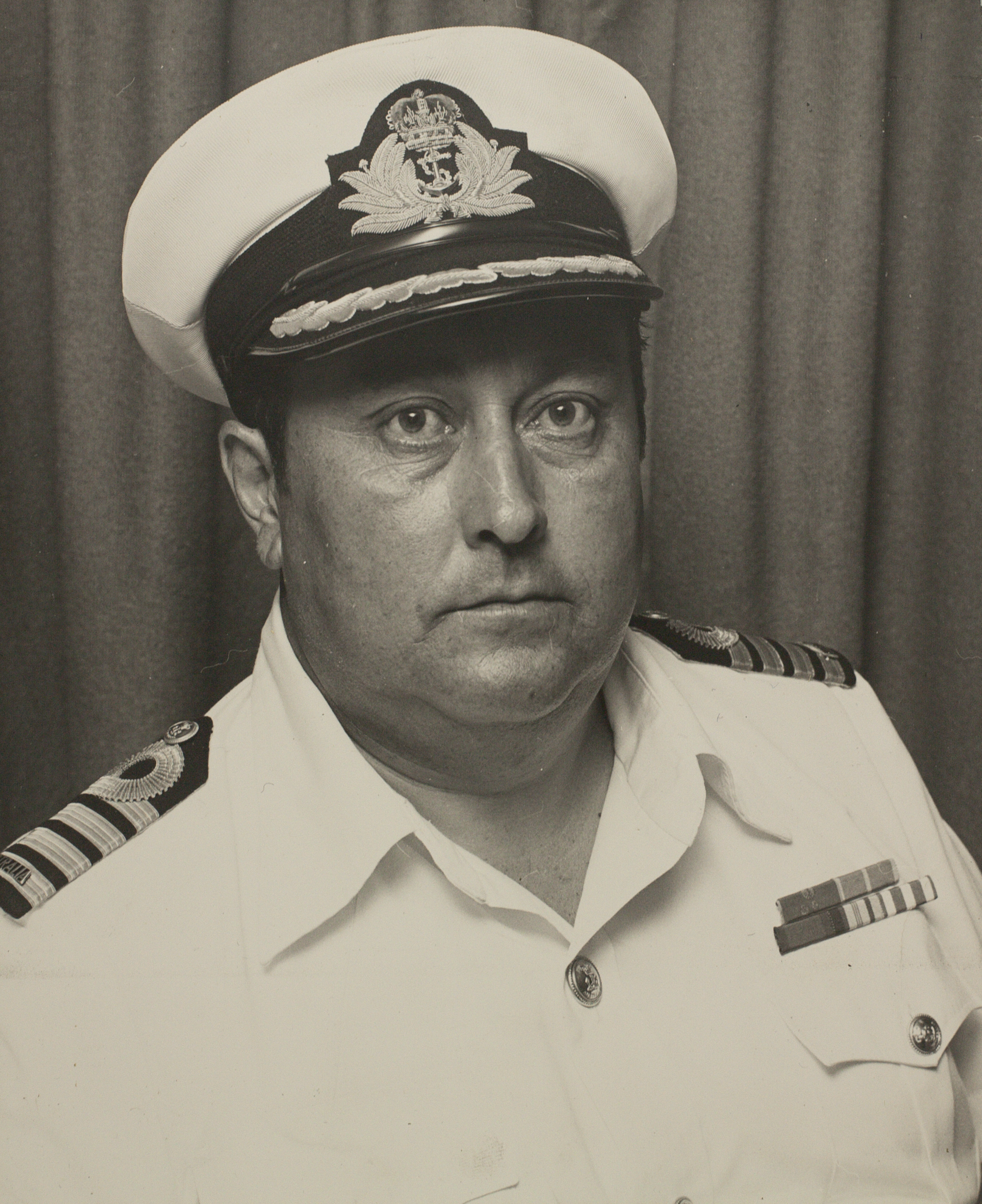

Administrator of Northern Territory
- In office 1 January 1981 – 1 July 1989
- Preceded by: John England
- Succeeded by: James Muirhead

Personal details
- Born: 29 July 1933 Shanghai, China
- Died: 26 February 1997 (aged 63) Darwin, Australia
- Spouse: Joan Johnston

Military service
- Allegiance: Australia
- Branch/service: Royal Australian Navy
- Years of service: 1947–1980
- Rank: Commodore
- Commands: HMAS Perth (1976–77); HMAS Vendetta (1969–70)
- Battles/wars: Indonesia–Malaysia confrontation Vietnam War
- Awards: Officer of the Order of Australia; Member of the Order of Australia (Mil Div); Officer of the Order of the British Empire; Commander, Order of Saint John

Commodore Eric Eugene Johnston AO, OBE (29 July 1933 – 26 February 1997) was a Royal Australian Navy officer and the Administrator of the Northern Territory from 1 January 1981 to 1 July 1989.

== Career ==
During his naval career he commanded HMAS Vendetta in the Vietnam War. Later he commanded HMAS Perth from 1976 to 1978.

After Cyclone Tracy in 1974, as Naval Officer Commanding Northern Australia, he was involved in the administration of emergency naval assistance.

== Recognition and honours ==
He was appointed an Officer of the Order of the British Empire in 1970, a Member of the Order of Australia in 1975, a Commander in the Order of Saint John in 1981 and advanced to an Officer of the Order of Australia in 1987.

The Eric Johnston Lectures of the Northern Territory Library were named in his honour. He gave the first lecture in 1986.

Government offices
Preceded by John England	Administrator of the Northern Territory; 1981–1989	Succeeded by James Muirhead
