= Michael Grant (judge) =

Australian judge (born 1963)

The Honourable Michael Grant AO

Chief Justice of the Northern Territory
- Incumbent
- Assumed office 5 July 2016
- Preceded by: Trevor Riley

Personal details
- Born: 23 January 1963 (age 63) Darwin, Northern Territory, Australia
- Education: University of Queensland
- Profession: Lawyer

Michael Patrick Grant AO (born 24 January 1963) is an Australian judge, who has been the Chief Justice of the Northern Territory since 2016.

Grant was born in Darwin in 1963, and educated at St Joseph's College, Hunters Hill in Sydney. He graduated with a Bachelor of Laws with first class honours from the University of Queensland. He practised as a solicitor from 1993, while also working as a lecturer in torts and taxation law at Northern Territory University.

In 1997, Grant worked as director of litigation in the office of the Attorney-General of the Northern Territory. In 1999, he joined William Forster Chambers as a barrister, and was made Queen's Counsel in 2006. From September 2007 to July 2016, Grant was Solicitor-General of the Northern Territory. He was appointed as Chief Justice in July 2016.

Legal offices
Preceded by Trevor Riley	Chief Justice of the Northern Territory; 2016–present	Incumbent
