= Scott Bowman (academic) =

Australian academic

Scott Bowman AO is an England-born Australian academic.

Originally working in England as a radiographer, Bowman was a principal lecturer at London South Bank University before becoming a dean at St Martin's College.

After relocating to Australia, Bowman served in various executive roles at Charles Sturt University, the University of South Australia, and James Cook University.

Bowman served as vice-chancellor of Central Queensland University from 2009 until his retirement in 2018.

Bowman holds a master's degree in politics and business administration and a PhD in clinical decision making.

In recognition of his service to higher education in Australia, Bowman was appointed as an Officer of the Order of Australia in the 2019 Queen's Birthday Honours.

On 18 February 2021, Bowman was announced as the new Vice-Chancellor of Charles Darwin University. He resigned on 23 February 2026 in response to an incident in which almost 300 CDU vocational education students were incorrectly accredited despite having not completed all the necessary elements of their courses.
