= Star Theatre, Darwin =

Former cinema in Darwin, Australia

Coordinates: 12°27′51″S 130°50′35″E

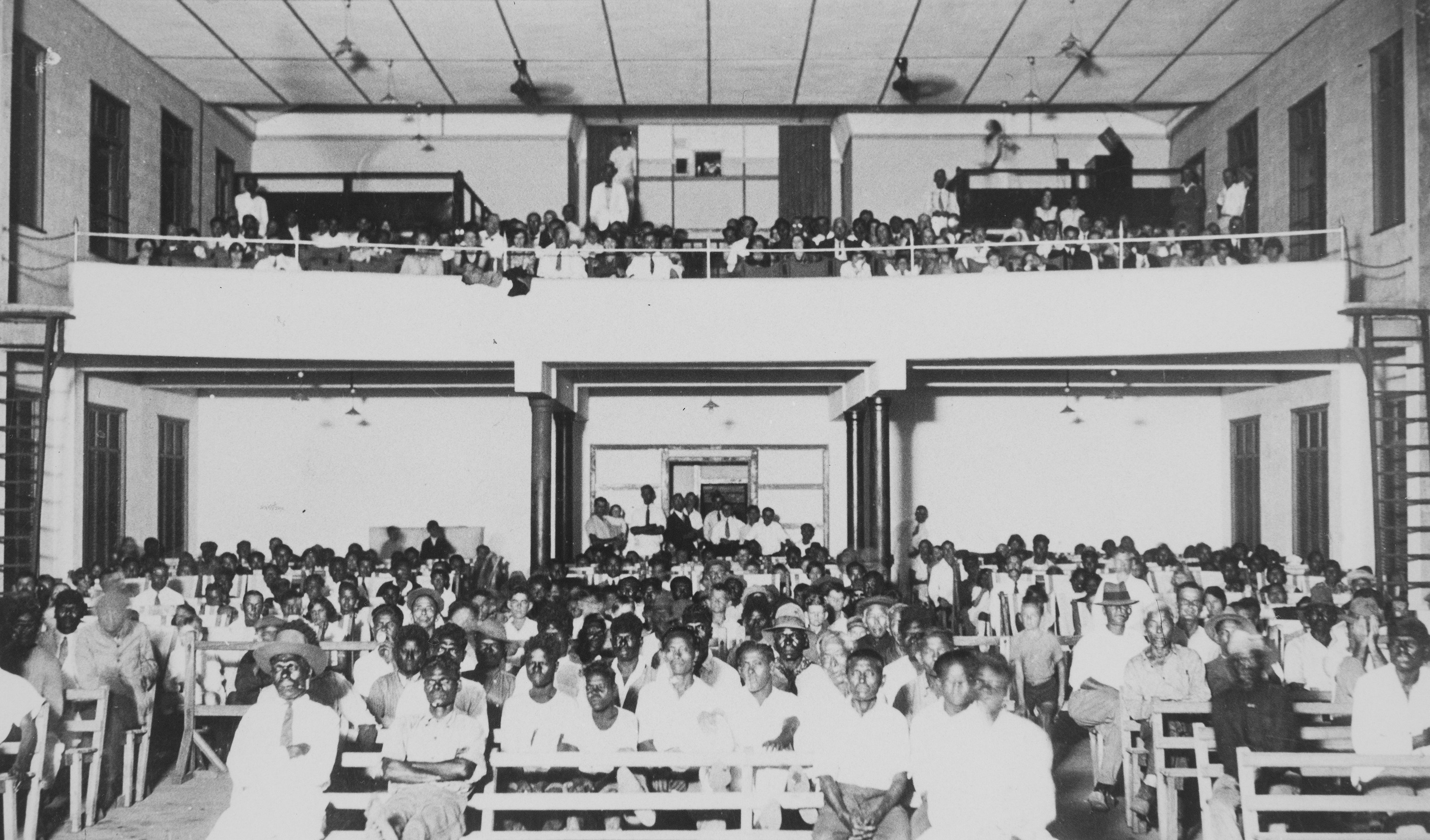
Postcard of the audience within the Star Picture Theatre

The Star Theatre was the first purpose-built cinema in Darwin in the Northern Territory of Australia. Destroyed during Cyclone Tracy, it was the centre of Darwin's social life between the 1930s and 1960s.

== Construction ==
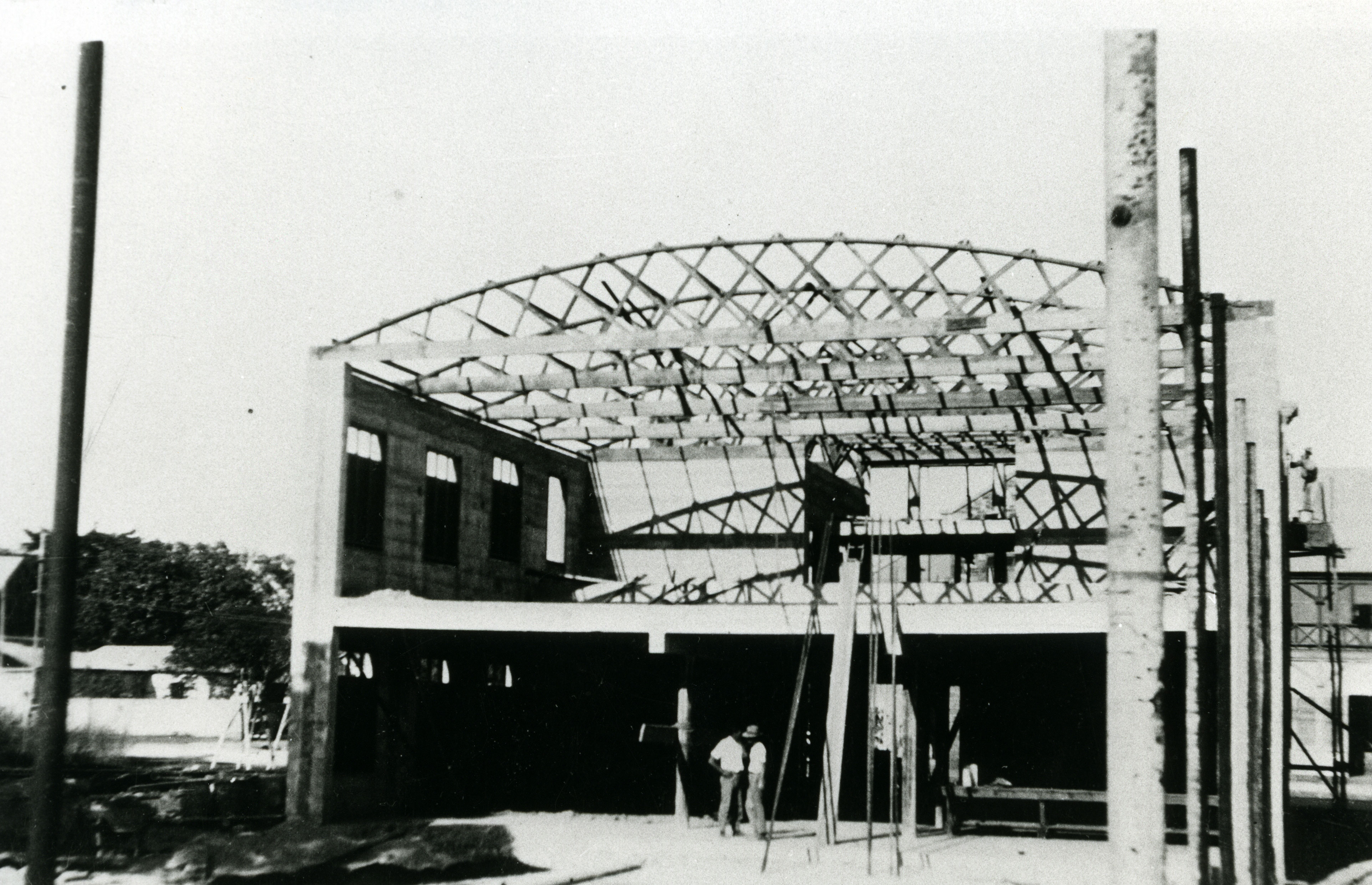
Star Theatre under construction in Darwin

The partially open air theatre was built by Snell and Gordon, the company of well-known Darwin builder Harold Snell, in the 1920s. The theatre's design was innovative at the time, in particular the roof structure, which Snell had studied in England. Only the rear rows at the back and upstairs dress circle was covered by a roof. The stage was on wheels to be moved for boxing matches and the floor was concrete in anticipation of future roller-skating events and social dances. It could seat 860 people.

== Centre of social life ==
The Star Theatre finally opened on 14 September 1929. The first film shown was The Cat and the Canary which had a film reel that was reported to be 10,000 feet long. The film was shown "without the slightest hitch except that Mr Allwright while attending to the engine got his hand caught in a rapidly moving belt and badly lacerated several fingers".

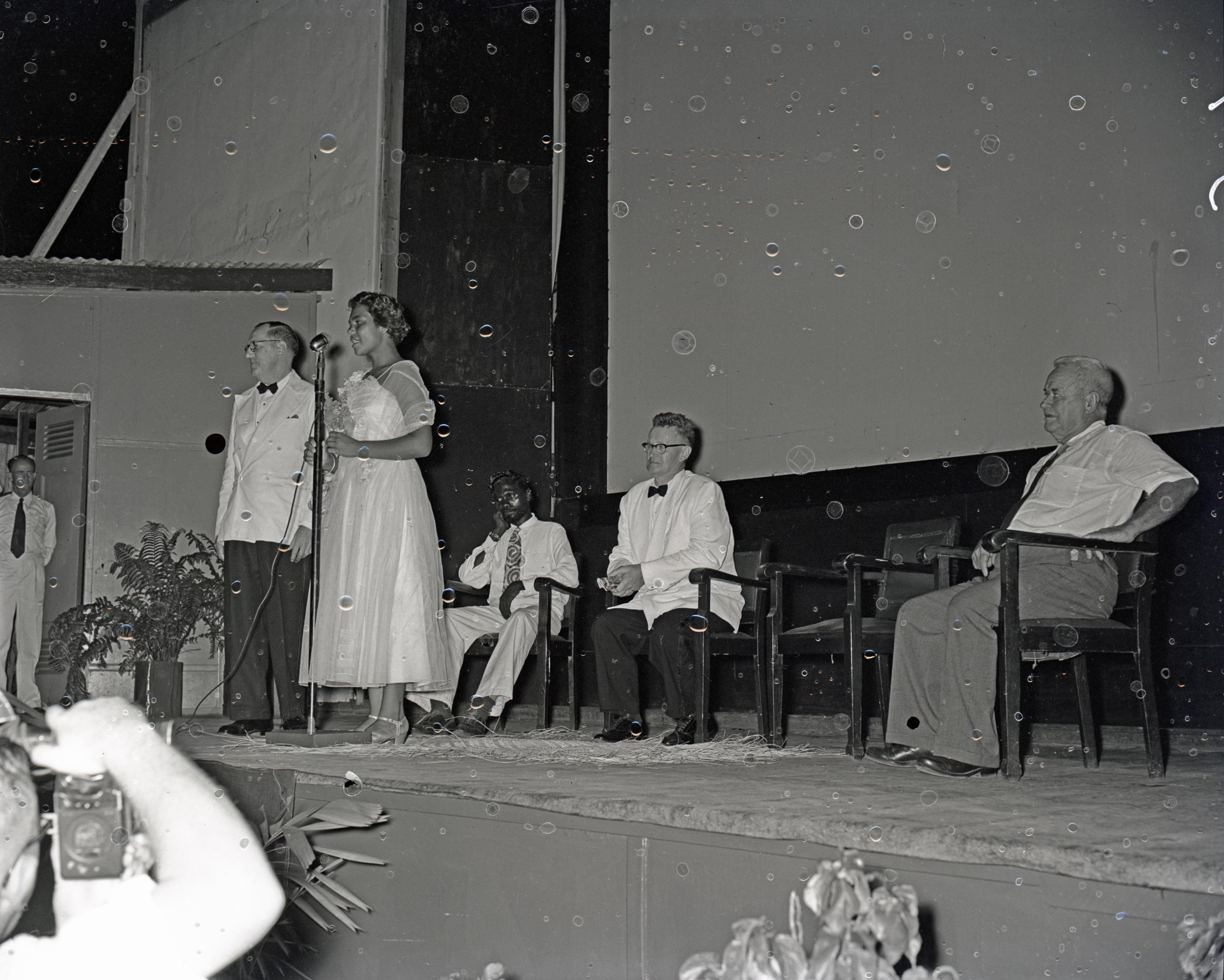
Ngarla Kunoth speaking at the Darwin premiere of Jedda at the Star Theatre in 1955.

The business was leased to manager Tom Harris who later purchased the theatre. Harris was a popular figure in Darwin.

The balcony was reserved for Darwin high society while working class and Aboriginal people, who were given permission from the Chief Protector of Aborigines to break their night-time town curfew so they could attend, were expected to sit downstairs. It cost 2/6 pence to sit upstairs and only a shilling to "sit in the blacks".

The Australian film Jedda had its world premiere at the Star Theatre on 3 January 1955. Harris arranged for a member of the Warhiti tribe "to sing songs and burn sticks to prevent any unwanted rainfalls during the screening. He decorated the theatre for the opening with pandanus, grass mats and Aboriginal artefacts. Large crowds gathered along Smith Street to catch a glimpse of the film's stars Ngarla Kunoth and Robert Tudawali, better known as Bob Wilson, who were permitted to sit in the balcony with the Northern Territory Administrator Frank Wise and his wife. Tudawali decided to sit downstairs. It was reported that a number of Aborigines who were invited had paddled in from Bathurst Island to attend.

The Star lost popularity during the 1960s when two new cinemas opened in Darwin by Michael Paspalis, the open-air Parap Theatre and the drive-in cinema at Nightcliff in 1964.

== Current use ==
The Star Theatre was destroyed during Cyclone Tracy in 1974 and never reopened. Manager Tom Harris had died the year before after 40 years in the Northern Territory. His son, Tom Harris Junior, renovated the theatre, turning the projector room into a flat where he and his wife would live for a number of years.

The Star was renovated again and turned into a small shopping village containing a number of small shops and cafes. It continues to be a shopping arcade, now known as Star Village. The original projector is still on display near the entrance to the arcade.

An application to heritage list the theatre was made in 1995 but was unsuccessful due to opposition from the owners.
