= Kevin O'Leary (judge) =

Australian judge (1920–2015)

Kevin Fredrick O'Leary QC (19 February 1920 – 3 August 2015) was the second Chief Justice of the Supreme Court of the Northern Territory. He was appointed to that position on 12 September 1985 after James Muirhead had acted in the position following the relocation to Perth of the Territory's first Chief Justice William Forster earlier that year.

== Education and early life ==
Chief Justice O'Leary was born in Sydney, New South Wales, and attended the Christian Brothers' High School, Lewisham. He commenced studying law at the University of Sydney and joined the Australian Imperial Forces in 1940 and the Royal Australian Air Force in 1942. After the war ended, he returned to studying and eventually graduated with Honours in 1948 and was admitted to practice the following year.

== Legal career and other interests ==
Chief Justice O'Leary practised as a barrister and solicitor in Sydney and established the firm of Colreavy and O'Leary. He was called to the Bar in 1957 and relocated to the Australian Capital Territory, where he served with distinction.

He has held many important roles during his career:

- Lecturer, Practice and Procedure and the Australian National University (1964–1982)
- Vice-President, Law Society of the Australian Capital Territory (1965–1967)
  - President (1967–1970)
- Member, Executive of the Law Council of Australia (1969–1976)
  - Vice President (1972–1974)
    - President (1974–1976)
- First Chair, Australian Legal Education Council from (1977–1981)
- Founding Director, Legal Workshop at the Faculty of Law at the Australian National University (1971–1982)
- Elected, Honorary Member of the American Bar Association (1976)

Chief Justice O'Leary was appointed as an Acting Judge of the National Court of Papua New Guinea in 1976 and as an Acting Judge of the Supreme Court of the Northern Territory in 1982. That appointment was made permanent in 1983. He was elevated to the position of Chief Justice in 1985. He resigned in 1987 due to ill-health and relocated to Western Australia. In retirement he lived in Canberra, and was a resident at Calvary Retirement Village. He was appointed as a Queen's Counsel in the Northern Territory immediately following his retirement.

== Publications ==
- Principles of Practice and Procedure (with A. E. Hogan) (1976)
- Supreme Court Civil Procedure (1987)

Legal offices
Preceded by Sir William Forster	Chief Justice of the Northern Territory; 1985-1987	Succeeded by Austin Asche
