= William Forster (judge) =

Australian judge (1921–1997)

Sir William Edward Stanley Forster (15 June 1921 – 31 January 1997) was an Australian judge. He was the first Chief Justice of the Supreme Court of the Northern Territory holding that position from 1979 to 1985. Before that, he was the first (and only) Chief Judge from 1977 to 1979 and Senior Judge from 1971 to 1977, all positions which were effectively the same.

== Early life and education ==
William Edward Stanley Forster was born in Sydney on 15 June 1921 and, after moving to Adelaide in 1929, attended St Peter's College, Adelaide.

Forster graduated with a Bachelor of Laws from the University of Adelaide.

He was in the Royal Australian Air Force from 1940 to 1946.

== Career ==
Forster was lecturer of law and procedure and of criminal law from 1957 to 1958 at the University of Adelaide.

Forster was a magistrate at the Adelaide Magistrates Court from 1959 to 1961.

He was Deputy Master of the Supreme Court of South Australia from 1961 to 1966, and Master from 1966 to 1971.

He was District Registrar of the High Court of Australia from 1966 to 1971 and before that was District Registrar from 1961 to 1966.

=== Northern Territory Supreme Court judge ===
Forster was appointed Senior Judge of the Supreme Court of the Northern Territory on 28 June 1971 and replaced Justice Blackburn who had taken up appointment with the Supreme Court of the Australian Capital Territory.

After Cyclone Tracy had destroyed Darwin in 1974, Justice Forster ensured the Supreme Court of the Northern Territory was fully functional by March 1975.

== Other roles and activities ==
Forster was a member of the Standing Committee Senate at the University of Adelaide from 1967 to 1971.

He was a member of the Aboriginal Theatre Foundation from 1972 to 1975, and president of the Northern Territory division of the Australian Red Cross from 1973 to 1985. He chaired the board of the Museum and Art Gallery of the Northern Territory from 1974 to 1985.

He chaired the Northern Territory Parole Board from 1976 to 1985, and held a dormant commission as Acting Administrator of the Northern Territory from 1976 to 1985. He was also a Justice of the Federal Court of Australia from 1977 to 1989.

== Awards and honours ==
Forster was honoured as a Knight Bachelor in 1982 for services to law, and was the only person to be knighted for services to the Northern Territory.

== Death and legacy ==
In 1976, Forster was responsible for the introduction of the "Anunga Rules" which, established guidelines for the interrogation of Aboriginal and non-English-speaking persons by Northern Territory Police to ensure that admissions were voluntarily obtained.

Forster was a champion of the local legal profession and upon his retirement expressed a wish that vacancies on the Bench be filled by local practitioners. All appointments to the Supreme Court from 1991 (other than that of Chief Justice Brian Ross Martin in 2004) have been from the local profession.

He retired in 1985 due to ill-health, and relocated to Perth. He died on 31 January 1997.

William Forster Chambers in Darwin now carries his name, being officially named by him on 30 October 1987, after his retirement.

Legal offices
Preceded by new office	Chief Justice of the Northern Territory; 1979–1985	Succeeded by Kevin O'Leary
