= Chief Justice of the Northern Territory =

The title of Chief Justice of the Northern Territory refers to the highest judicial position in the Supreme Court of the Northern Territory. The position is currently held by Michael Grant.

== History of the Chief Justice of the Northern Territory ==
The Supreme Court of the Northern Territory was established in 1911. From 1911 to 1974 the Northern Territory had only one resident judge. Relief was provided by Commonwealth judges from 1961 to 1976, and by Federal Court judges from 1976 to 1978. The Northern Territory gained Self-Government in 1978 and by that time had four resident judges.

The title given to the judge varied in name, as the laws concerning the position varied. In 1975 the position was renamed to Chief Judge, with Sir William Forster the only person to hold that position, from 1977 to 1979. Forster uniquely held 3 different titles relating to the same position, that of Senior Judge, Chief Judge and Chief Justice, when the position title was changed again in 1979. Since that time there have been 6 Chief Justices of the Court. From 1911 to 1974, there were eight resident judges (not including Forster).

== List of resident and senior judges of the Northern Territory ==
- Samuel James Mitchell 1911–1912
- David John Davies Bevan 1912–1920
- Donald Arthur Roberts 1921–1928
- Ross Ibbotson Dalton Mallam 1928–1933
- Thomas Alexander Wells 1933–1952
- Martin Chemnitz Kriewaldt 1952–1960
- Alan Bruce Keith Ian Bridge 1961–1966
- Sir Richard Arthur Blackburn 1966–1971
- Sir William Edward Stanley Forster 1971–1977

== List of chief judges of the Northern Territory ==
- Sir William Edward Stanley Forster 1977–1979

== List of chief justices of the Northern Territory ==
- Sir William Edward Stanley Forster 1979–1985
- Kevin Frederick O'Leary 1985–1987
- Keith John Austin Asche 1987–1993
- Brian Frank Martin 1993–2003
- Brian Ross Martin 2004–2010
- Trevor Riley 2010–2016
- Michael Grant 2016–present
