= Trevor Riley =

Australian judge

Trevor John Riley AO KC (born 29 January 1948) was the Chief Justice of the Supreme Court of the Northern Territory in Australia. He was appointed a judge of the Supreme Court on 1 February 1999, Chief Justice on 27 September 2010 and retired on 4 July 2016.

Justice Riley was born in Bruce Rock in Western Australia and was educated at the Merredin Senior High School and the University of Western Australia.

After graduating with a Bachelor of Laws, he was admitted to practice in 1970. He relocated to Darwin in 1974. He worked with Ian Barker in the firm Withnall & Barker until 1974 when Cyclone Tracy destroyed Darwin. After the cyclone he joined the firm Ward Keller.

Justice Riley joined the Northern Territory Bar in 1985 and was appointed as a Queen's Counsel in 1988. From 1988 - 1991 he was counsel in the Royal Commission into Aboriginal Deaths in Custody.

On 22 July 2010 it was announced that Justice Riley would become the Northern Territory's sixth Chief Justice after the retirement of Brian Ross Martin. Justice Riley retired in 2016.

Legal offices
Preceded by Brian Ross Martin	Chief Justice of the Northern Territory; 2010–2016	Succeeded by Michael Grant
