= Mengele (disambiguation) =

Josef Mengele (1911–1979) was a German doctor and SS officer.

Mengele may also refer to:

- Meņģele parish, in Ogre municipality, Latvia
- Mengele Zoo, a 1989 novel by Gert Nygårdshaug

== Further people with the surname ==
- Benno Mengele (1890–1971), Austrian electrical engineer

== See also ==
- Mengler, German surname
- Carl Frederick Mengeling, an American Roman Catholic bishop
