= Austin Asche =

Australian judge (1925–2024)

Keith John Austin Asche AC KStJ KC (/æʃ/ ASH; 28 November 1925 – 14 December 2024) was an Australian judge. He was Administrator of the Northern Territory of Australia and was the third Chief Justice of the Supreme Court of the Northern Territory.

== Background ==
Asche was born in Melbourne, the son of Eric Thomas Asche and Beryl Victoria Asche (née Woinarski). Eric was the nephew of the actor Oscar Asche.

In 1926, Eric Asche (father of Austin Asche) was appointed Legal Assistant in the Crown Law Office, Department of the Government Secretary for the Territory of New Guinea. They departed from Sydney on 25 August, and the family spent a year in Rabaul. Eric then successfully applied for a job in Darwin, and the family sailed on the SS Marella, arriving on 18 February 1928. The family relocated from Rabaul, after a 1-year appointment of Austin's father, to Darwin and lived at the Mud Hut (Knight's Folly) before it burnt down on 31 December 1933. Eric Thomas Asche was one of a small number of lawyers in Darwin at that time and held the position of Crown Law Officer.

Austin Asche attended Darwin Primary School before returning to Melbourne in 1938 and attending Melbourne Grammar School. He joined the Royal Australian Air Force in 1944 and served until 1946. Upon discharge he attended the University of Melbourne, where he was a member of Trinity College, and attained a Bachelor of Arts and a Master of Laws degree. He was admitted to practice on 1 February 1950.

Asche married microbiologist, Leila Valerie James, on 11 April 1958, and they had one son and one daughter. He died on 14 December 2024, at the age of 99.

== The Victorian Bar and early judicial office ==
Asche relocated to Brisbane and was admitted to practice there in February 1951. Upon returning to Melbourne in 1954 he practised at the Bar until 1975, eventually being appointed a Queen's Counsel in 1972. He was a part-time lecturer at the Royal Melbourne Institute of Technology from 1968 to 1975.

In 1976 he was appointed the first Victorian Judge of the new formed Family Court of Australia. He was a member of the Royal Melbourne Institute of Technology Council from 1974 to 1976, its vice president from 1977 to 1981 and President from 1981 - 1983. He was Chancellor of Deakin University from 1983 - 1987 Acting Chief Judge of the Family Court from 1985 - 1986. He was also a member of the Family Law Council from 1976 to 1979, Chairman of the Inquiry into Teacher Education in Victoria in 1979 and 1980 and a Councillor and later Chairman of the Frankston State College from 1973 - 1979.

During his time in Victoria Asche was an active Freemason and served as Grand Master of the United Grand Lodge of Victoria from 1984 to 1986.

== Northern Territory ==
Asche was appointed a Judge of the Supreme Court of the Northern Territory on 14 April 1986 and was appointed Chief Justice on 17 August 1987 following the retirement of Kevin O'Leary. While Chief Justice he was Chair of the Northern Territory Parole Board and was President of the Northern Territory Division of the Red Cross Society and President of the Northern Territory Branch of the Scout Association. He was also Chancellor of Northern Territory University from 1989 - 1993.

He resigned as Chief Justice on 26 February 1993 to take up appointment as Administrator of the Northern Territory on 1 March. While Administrator he was patron of numerous organisations including being the Northern Territory Chief Scout, an Honorary Colonel in NORFORCE, and a Deputy Prior of the Order of St. John.

Asche retired in 1997 and was later chair of the Northern Territory Law Reform Committee. He was also an adjunct professor in Law and emeritus Chancellor at the Charles Darwin University.

== Honours and awards ==
Asche was appointed a Knight of the Order of St. John in 1993 and made a Companion of the Order of Australia in 1994. He was also awarded Honorary Doctorates from both Deakin University and Charles Darwin University. He was also made Honorary Freeman of the City of Darwin in 2007.

Government offices
Preceded by James Muirhead	Administrator of the Northern Territory; 1993–1997	Succeeded by Neil Raymond Conn
Legal offices
Preceded by Kevin O'Leary	Chief Justice of the Northern Territory; 1987–1993	Succeeded by Brian Frank Martin
Masonic offices
Preceded by Henry Nathan	Grand Master of the United Grand Lodge of Victoria; 1984-1986	Succeeded by John Connell
