= Sally Thomas =

Australian judge

The Honourable Sally Thomas AC
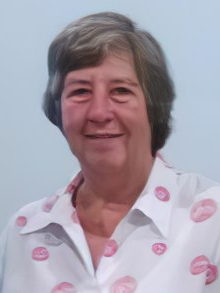
- Thomas in 2014

Administrator of the Northern Territory
- In office 31 October 2011 – 30 October 2014
- Deputy: Pat Miller
- Preceded by: Tom Pauling
- Succeeded by: John Hardy

Chancellor of Charles Darwin University
- In office 2010–2016
- Preceded by: Richard Ryan
- Succeeded by: Neil Balnaves

Judge of the Supreme Court (NT)
- In office 30 July 1992 – 7 August 2009

Personal details
- Born: 7 August 1939 (age 86) Cambridge, England
- Spouse: Ted Rowe
- Domestic partner: Duncan McNeill
- Education: Hornsby Girls' High School
- Profession: Lawyer

Sally Gordon Thomas (born 7 August 1939) is a former Judge of the Supreme Court of the Northern Territory, serving from 1992 to 2009. She was appointed to the Court on 10 August 1992 and was the first woman to be appointed a Judge of the Court. She was sworn in as the first female Administrator of the Northern Territory in October 2011. One of her first engagements in the role was to welcome Barack Obama, the President of the United States, to Darwin during his visit in November 2011.

== Early life ==
Thomas was born in Cambridge, England on 7 August 1939, to Geoffrey A and Mary G Thomas. Her family relocated to Sydney, New South Wales in 1947. She attended Hornsby Girls' High School and eventually commenced work as a solicitor in New South Wales in 1963.

== Magistrate and beyond ==
Thomas and her husband Ted Rowe relocated to Darwin in 1978 after she was appointed a Magistrate. She was appointed Chief Magistrate in 1986 and held that position until she was appointed to the Supreme Court bench in 1992. Thomas retired on 6 August 2009.

She was President of the Australian Stipendiary Magistrates Association from 1988 to 1990.

She has a strong interest in the tertiary education of Territorians and was Deputy Chairman of the Northern Territory College of Queensland University and then a Member of the then Northern Territory University Council from 1989 to 2003. In 2003 the Northern Territory University changed its name and became part of the expanded Charles Darwin University. She was appointed to the Council of Charles Darwin University and elected Deputy Chancellor, and she was appointed Chancellor of the University on 1 January 2010. Upon the completion of her second term as Chancellor, she announced Neil Balnaves would succeed her as Chancellor of the University.

Her career has not been limited to the judicial system, she was Chair of the Northern Territory Legal Aid Commission from 1990 to 1996, Chair of the Northern Territory Winston Churchill Fellowship Committee from 1992 to 2004 and in 2004 she was appointed Deputy National Chair Fellowship, of the Winston Churchill Memorial Trust.

In June 2000 she was appointed a Member of the Order of Australia for her service to the community, particularly through the Northern Territory Winston Churchill Memorial Fellowship Committee, to tertiary education, and to the law. She continues to hold an interest in these fields.

== Honours ==
On 12 June 2000, Thomas was appointed a Member of the Order of Australia for service to the community, particularly through the Northern Territory Winston Churchill Memorial Fellowship Committee, to tertiary education, and to the law. On 26 January 2014, Thomas was named a Companion of the Order of Australia for eminent service to the people of the Northern Territory, particularly to the judiciary and social justice, to the advancement of women in the legal profession, to youth, and to the promotion and development of tertiary education.-

She was nominated Senior Australian of the Year in 2010 for her achievements in her legal career.

== Other interests ==
Thomas is Patron of a number of organizations. She has been a Member of the Council of the Charles Darwin University since 1989 and has been the Northern Territory Chair of the Winston Churchill Fellowship since 1992. She was also Chair of the Northern Territory Legal Aid Commission from 1990 to 1996 and was an Honorary Colonel in the Northern Territory Cadet Corp of the Australian Army from 1993 – 1997. She was also an advisor to the Family Law Council.

== Administrator of the Northern Territory ==
It was announced on 6 October 2011 that Sally Thomas would be appointed the 20th Administrator of the Northern Territory, as well as the first female in that role. She was sworn into this position on 31 October 2011 at Parliament House, Darwin by the Governor-General of Australia, Ms Quentin Bryce AC.

Academic offices
Preceded by Richard Ryan	Chancellor of Charles Darwin University; 2010–2016	Succeeded by Neil Balnaves
