= Brian Ross Martin =

Australian judge

The Honourable Brian Martin AO KC

4th Commonwealth Director of Public Prosecutions
- In office 1997 – February 1999

Judge of the Supreme Court of South Australia
- In office 23 February 1999 – 27 January 2004

Chief Justice of the Northern Territory
- In office 27 January 2004 – 2010
- Preceded by: Brian Frank Martin
- Succeeded by: Trevor Riley

Acting Judge of the Supreme Court of Western Australia
- In office February 2012 – November 2012

Royal Commissioner for the Royal Commission into Juvenile Detention in the Northern Territory
- Incumbent
- Assumed office 28 July 2016
- Nominated by: Prime Minister Malcolm Turnbull MP
- Appointed by: Governor-General Sir Peter Cosgrove

Personal details
- Born: Brian Ross Martin; 2 September 1947 (age 79) Adelaide, South Australia
- Citizenship: Australian
- Education: University of Adelaide
- Profession: Lawyer; Jurist

Brian Ross Martin AO KC (born 2 September 1947) is an Australian jurist. He was a judge of the Supreme Court of South Australia before being appointed Chief Justice of the Supreme Court of the Northern Territory in 2004. He served in the Northern Territory between 2004 and 2010. He served as an acting Judge of the Supreme Court of Western Australia in 2012. In legal texts, he is referred to as "Martin (BR) CJ" to avoid confusion with his predecessor.

== Education ==
Martin was born in Adelaide and was educated at the Oakbank Area School and the Adelaide High School before studying at the University of Adelaide.

== Legal career ==
Brian Ross Martin was admitted to practise law in 1970, becoming an assistant Crown Prosecutor in Adelaide in 1974 and eventually the Senior Crown Prosecutor in 1982. He was appointed as a Queen's Counsel (QC) in 1984 and in 1991 was appointed Senior Counsel assisting the Royal Commission into WA Inc. Martin was appointed as the Commonwealth Director of Public Prosecutions in 1997 a position he held until taking up his appointment as a Judge of the South Australian Supreme Court. He was sworn in as the Northern Territory's fifth Chief Justice on 27 January 2004 following the retirement of Brian Frank Martin; and held the position until 2010.

Justice Martin was the trial judge for the trial of R v Murdoch, which commenced with a voir dire in April 2005 and the trial proper began on 17 October 2005, and was completed with a verdict of guilty on 13 December 2005. He also presided over the Snowtown murder cases involving the conviction of John Bunting, Robert Wagner, and James Vlassakis for murder, and Mark Haydon for helping to dispose of the bodies. The trial was one of the longest and most publicised in Australian legal history.

In February 2012, Brian Martin was sworn in as an Acting Judge of the Western Australian Supreme Court, to preside over the trial of Lloyd Rayney who was charged with the August 2007 murder of his wife, Corryn Rayney. Martin delivered his judgment, finding Rayney not guilty of his wife's murder, in November 2012.

In July 2016, he was appointed as the Royal Commissioner for the Royal Commission into Juvenile Detention in the Northern Territory, after the ABC Four Corners program "Australia's Shame" was broadcast. Martin resigned four days later, saying that "rightly or wrongly, in this role I would not have the full confidence of sections of the Indigenous community which has a vital interest in this inquiry."

== Other interests ==
Martin played 63 games, kicking 68 goals for Sturt Football Club in the South Australian National Football League (SANFL). He played in two SANFL premierships for the Double Blues. He was a Director of the Adelaide Crows Football Club from 1994 to 1998 and was Chairman of the Westminster School Council from 1988 to 1996.

Legal offices
Preceded by Brian Frank Martin	Chief Justice of the Northern Territory; 2004–2010	Succeeded by Trevor Riley
Preceded by Michael Rozenes	Commonwealth Director of Public Prosecutions; 1997–1999	Succeeded by Damian Bugg
