= Ian Barker (Australian barrister) =

Australian barrister (1935–2021)

Ian Barker QC
- Born: Ian McClelland Barker; 21 October 1935; Epping, New South Wales
- Died: 19 December 2021 (aged 86); Berry, New South Wales
- Education: Newington College; NSW Solicitors Admission Board
- Occupations: 1960 Solicitor; 1970 Barrister; 1974 Queen's Counsel
- Known for: Prosecution in the Azaria Chamberlain trial
- Spouses: Nelle Fish (m. 1960; div. 1981) Penny Brand (m. 1983)
- Children: 6

Ian McClelland Barker QC (21 October 1935 – 19 December 2021) was an Australian barrister and Queen's Counsel. He was the first Solicitor-General of the Northern Territory and was a former president of the NSW Bar Association. Barker retired as a barrister in 2017.

== Early life ==
Barker was born in Sydney and was educated at Newington College where his father Charles McClelland Barker was educated in the 1920s. His grandfather was a Methodist Minister and his father became an employee of the Dairy Farmers Co-op Milk Company. Barker’s mother Norma was a kindergarten teacher. On completing his Leaving Certificate in 1952 Barker chose to qualify in law through the NSW Solicitors Admission Board. He started his articles in 1953, earning one pound, 10 shillings a week, which in due course rose to two pounds.

== Northern Territory ==
Barker practiced as a barrister and solicitor in Alice Springs from 1961 to 1970 and in Darwin from 1970 to 1974. In 1974, Barker became one of the first Queen's Counsel appointed in the Northern Territory and practised at the Independent Bar at Darwin until his appointment as Solicitor-General of the Northern Territory in 1978, the first such appointment after self-government was granted to the territory. He returned to private practice at the Sydney Bar in 1980. Barker became known nationally in 1982 when he led the prosecution in the Azaria Chamberlain trial and Lindy Chamberlain was tried and convicted of her murder and Michael Chamberlain was convicted as an accessory after the fact. Both were later exonerated and received substantial compensation.

Aside from the Chamberlain trial, Barker had many successes that put him on a footing as one of Australia's most successful barristers. He successfully acted for John Marsden in a defamation case against the Seven Network where Marsden was wrongly portrayed as a paedophile. In a book written by Marsden before his death, he referred to Barker as "the best cross examiner in the land". Barker also successfully defended High Court judge Lionel Murphy from a charge of perverting the course of justice. He promoted a successful bill in the Northern Territory Parliament to make the Cobourg Peninsula into a national park.

== Bar Association ==
Barker was the president of the NSW Bar Association in 1998–1999.

== Human rights ==
Barker was a member of the International Human Rights Observer Panel which was established in 2005 by the Law Council of Australia. It was a part-time panel of Australian lawyers who serve as trial observers and undertake reviews in relation to human rights. He was regularly called upon by the national media as a commentator on matters relating to human rights and civil liberties.

== Clients ==
Barker represented the following clients in high profile court matters:

- John Marsden
- Patrick Power
- Marcus Einfeld
- Julian Moti (former Attorney General of Solomon Islands)

== Portrait ==
A portrait of Barker, by the artist Neville Dawson, is held by the National Library of Australia.

== Death ==
Barker died in December 2021, aged 86.
