= Charles Darwin University =

Public university in Northern Territory, Australia

- Emblem of Charles Darwin University
- Former names: List: Darwin Community College (1974–1984); Darwin Institute of Technology (1985–1988); Northern Territory University (1989–2003)
- Type: Public research university
- Established: 1974 (earliest college); 1989 (university status); 2003 (university merger)
- Accreditation: TEQSA
- Budget: A$422,120 million (2024)
- Chancellor: Trevor Riley
- Vice-Chancellor: Scott Bowman
- Academic staff: 606 (FTE, 2023)
- Administrative staff: 893 (FTE, 2023)
- Total staff: 1,481 (FTE, 2024)
- Students: 22,338 (2023)
- Undergraduates: 7,711 (2024)
- Postgraduates: 3,847 coursework (2024); 434 research (2024)
- Other students: 9,305 (VET) (2023); 1,249 other (2023)
- Location: Ellengowan Drive, Darwin, Northern Territory, 0810, Australia
- Campus: Urban and regional with multiple sites
- Named after: Charles Darwin
- Colours: Blue Red
- Nickname: Dangudbila (Larrakia for kangaroos)
- Sporting affiliations: UniSport; EAEN
- Mascot: Charles the Crocodile
- Website: cdu.edu.au

Charles Darwin University (CDU) is an Australian public university with two campuses in Darwin and six satellite campuses in metropolitan and regional areas of the Northern Territory and New South Wales. It was established in 2003 after the merger of Northern Territory University, the Menzies School of Health Research, and Centralian College.

It is the largest tertiary education provider in the Northern Territory and the first dual-sector university in Australia, offering both academic degree and vocational education programs. It has close ties to First Nations learning and research and was recognized as the most equitable university in Australia in 2025. The university is a member of the Northern Australia Universities Alliance and specialises in tropical savanna environments.

== History ==
Charles Darwin University evolved through the merger of several NT-based higher education institutions.

=== Darwin Community College ===
Darwin Community College, situated on what would become the site of Charles Darwin University’s Casuarina campus, was founded in 1974. In 1985, it evolved into the Darwin Institute of Technology, offering a mix of College of Advanced Education and TAFE studies.

In 1989, the institute became the Northern Territory University, offering degrees in Arts, Education, Business and Applied Science.

=== Menzies School of Health Research ===
The Menzies School of Health Research was established in 1985 as a body corporate of the Northern Territory Government under the Menzies School of Health Research Act 1985. This act was amended in 2004 to formalise the relationship with Charles Darwin University. Menzies is now a major partner with CDU and constitutes a school within the university on CDU's Casuarina campus, offering post-graduate degrees and higher degrees by research.

=== University College of the Northern Territory ===
The Government of the Northern Territory made numerous requests to the Commonwealth Government to finance a university. However, the population was deemed too small. In 1985, the Territory’s government took the unusual step of entirely financing a new entity named the University College of the Northern Territory over a five-year period from 1987 to 1991. The college was governed by a council chaired by former Family Court chief justice Austin Asche and led by a warden, Professor Jim Thomson, from the University of Queensland. The University of Queensland allowed the college to award degrees from that institution. Staff were recruited in 1986 and housed in the old Darwin Primary School buildings. Before the first student intake in February 1987, the college moved to a converted building at the former Darwin Hospital at Myilly Point in Darwin. A former nurses' hostel became a student residence named International House. The college had two faculties, Arts and Science. Its University of Queensland connection allowed it to award the first Doctor of Philosophy degrees in the Northern Territory.

=== Centralian College ===
Centralian College was founded in 1993 from the merger of Sadadeen Senior Secondary College and the Alice Springs College of TAFE. During its life, the college delivered senior secondary, TAFE and higher education through its main campus in Alice Springs, and to a lesser extent the whole Northern Territory.

A merger with NTU in 2003 resulted in a newly divested Centralian College becoming a senior secondary school catering to students from Year 10 to Year 12. It now shares its campus with the Charles Darwin University, using the university's facilities. Centralian College students can participate in CDU’s vocational courses from as early as Year 10.

=== Northern Territory University ===
The Northern Territory University was founded in January 1989 by a merger between the Darwin Institute of Technology and the University College of the Northern Territory under the Dawkins Revolution, a series of higher education reforms rolled out by then federal Education Minister John Dawkins. The new university opened its doors on 1 January 1989, awarding degrees from the University of Queensland.

NTU's first vice-chancellor was Murdoch University Professor Malcolm (Mal) Nairn. During Nairn's term of office, study centres that were previously run by the NT Government were integrated with the university. The Palmerston campus, which had previously been a TAFE College, was also added. The Palmerston campus is situated on University Avenue, as this was the proposed site for a new university in a submission to the federal government in 1981.

In 1996, Nairn was replaced by Professor Roger Holmes from Griffith University. After serving for a single semester, he left to take up the post of vice-chancellor at the University of Newcastle. Deputy Vice-Chancellor professor Ron McKay replaced Holmes as the university's third vice-chancellor. Financial constraints on the university increased as it struggled with providing a broad tertiary education offering to a small and widespread population. In January 2001, the Katherine Rural College, including Mataranka Station, became part of the university. After McKay's resignation due to ill health in 2002, an interim vice-chancellor, former vice-chancellor of the University of Wollongong Professor Ken McKinnon, was appointed.

=== Charles Darwin University ===
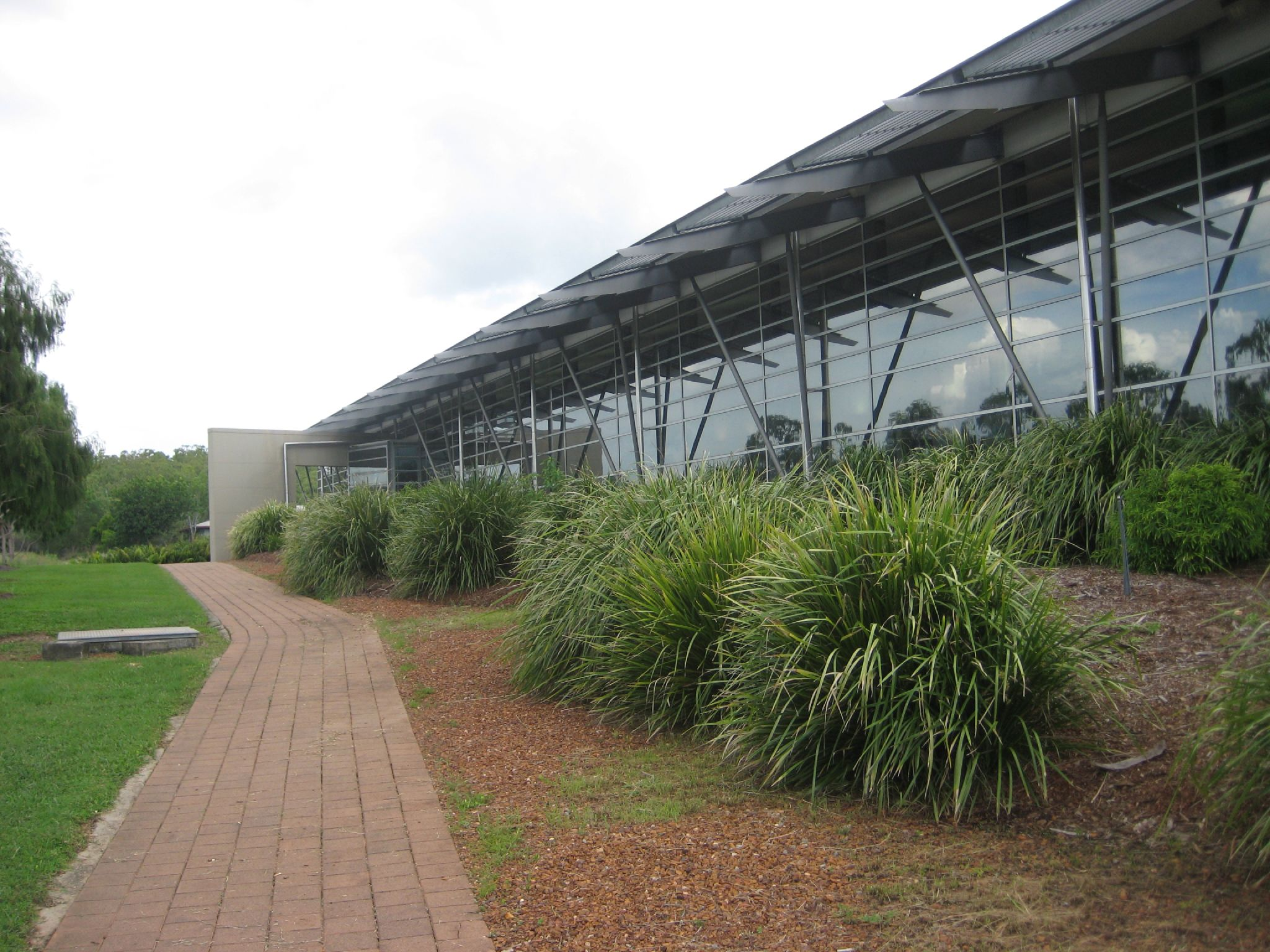
Library, Palmerston campus

On 21 August 2003, the Northern Territory Legislative Assembly passed the Charles Darwin University Act 2003 (NT), merging Alice Springs' Centralian College and the Menzies School of Health Research with the Northern Territory University to form Charles Darwin University from 1 January 2004. The inaugural university council meeting was held on 26 November 2003.

== Campuses and buildings ==
The university has its main campus in Casuarina, in Darwin’s north. In 2024, it opened the Danala campus in the Darwin's Education and Community Precinct. Five additional satellite campuses are spread across metropolitan and regional areas: Palmerston, Katherine, Nhulunbuy and Alice Springs in the NT, and Sydney.

== Governance and structure ==
The current and fifth chancellor of the university is former Chief Justice of the Northern Territory, Trevor Riley AO KC who was inducted into the position from 1 July 2025. The vice-chancellor and president of the university since May 2021 is Professor Scott Bowman.

=== Academic structure ===
CDU comprises three faculties offering undergraduate and postgraduate qualifications:

- Faculty of Arts and Society
- Faculty of Health
- Faculty of Science and Technology

It also has CDU TAFE offering vocational education and training.

== Academic profile ==
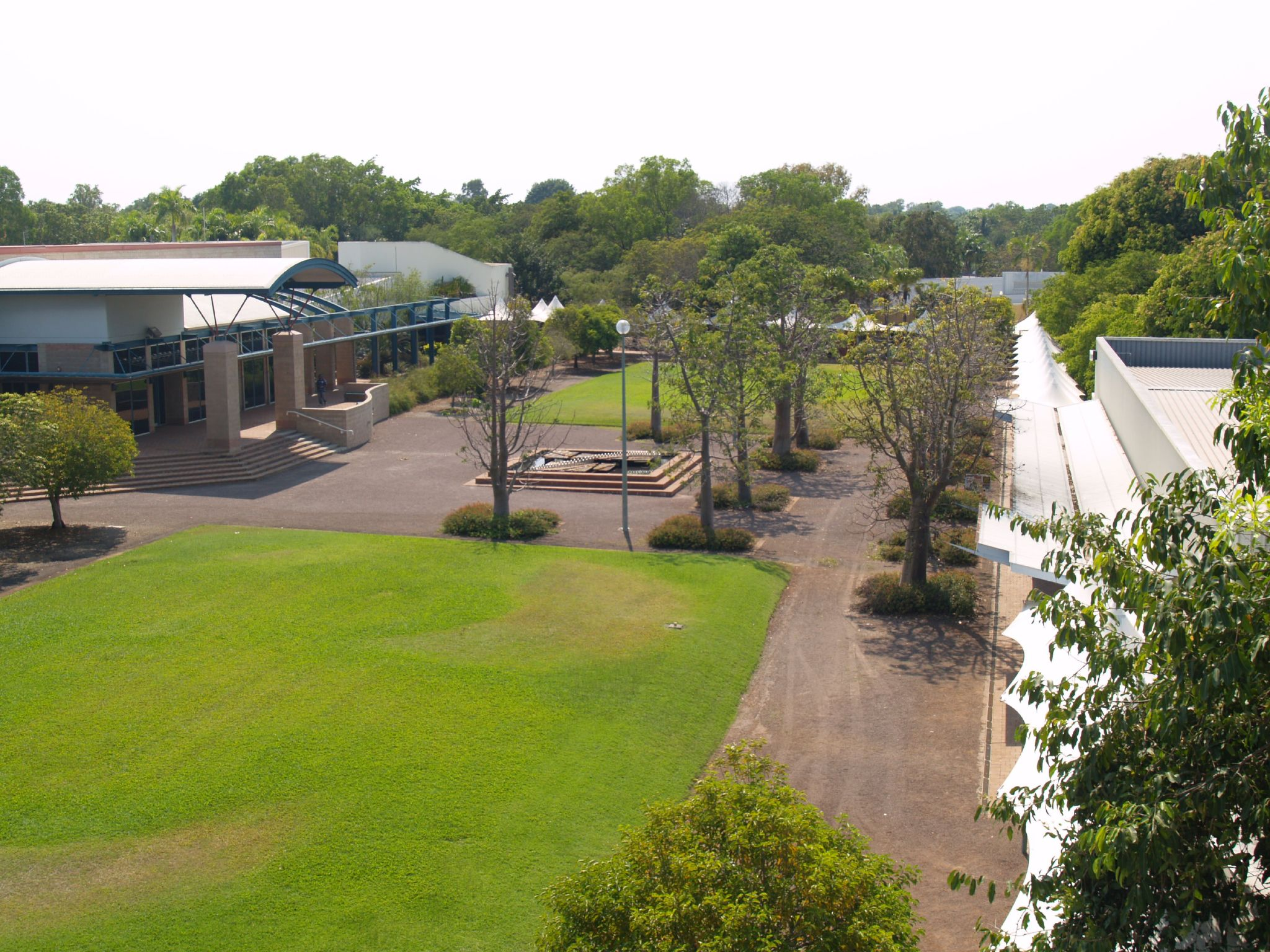
Courtyard, Casuarina campus

CDU is a dual-sector university which also offers vocational education and training (VET) courses, in addition to undergraduate and postgraduate degrees, across various industry sectors including engineering and mining, agriculture and aquaculture, health care, trades and education.

=== Research divisions ===
Charles Darwin University's research institutes and centres include:

- Menzies School of Health Research
- Research Institute for Environment and Livelihoods (tropical savanna research)
- Northern Institute (social and policy research in Northern Australia)
- Energy and Resources Institute
- Research Institute for Northern Agriculture
- The Molly Wardaguga Institute for First Nations Birth Rights
- Centre for Creative Futures
- North Australia Centre for Autonomous Systems
- NT Academic Centre for Cybersecurity and Innovation
- Health Hub (student-run multidisciplinary health centre)
- First Nations Sovereignty and Diplomacy Centre

=== Academic reputation ===
University rankings

Global – Overall
- CWTS World: 1248 (Note: The CWTS Leiden Ranking is based on P (top 10%).) (2024)
- QS World: =584 (2026)
- THE World: 401–500 (2026)
- USNWR Global: =797 (25/26)

National – Overall
- CWTS National: 33 (2024)
- ERA National: 37 (2018)
- QS National: 29 (2026)
- THE National: 26–32 (2025)
- USNWR National: 29 (25/26)
- AFR National: =34 (2025)

National publications

In the Australian Financial Review Best Universities Ranking 2025, the university was tied #34 amongst Australian universities. In the same review, the university was ranked first amongst Australian universities for equity.

Global publications

In the 2026 Quacquarelli Symonds World University Rankings (published 2025), the university attained a tied position of #584 (29th nationally).

In the Times Higher Education World University Rankings 2026 (published 2025), the university attained a position of #401–500 (tied 26–32nd nationally).

In the 2025–2026 U.S. News & World Report Best Global Universities, the university attained a tied position of #797 (29th nationally).

In the CWTS Leiden Ranking 2024, the university attained a position of #1248 (33rd nationally).

=== Student outcomes ===
The Australian Government's QILT (Note: Abbreviation for Quality Indicators for Learning and Teaching.) conducts national surveys documenting the student life cycle from enrolment through to employment. These surveys place more emphasis on criteria such as student experience, graduate outcomes and employer satisfaction rather than perceived reputation, research output and citation counts.

In the 2024 Graduate Outcomes Survey, CDU graduates had a full-time employment rate of 84.9% for undergraduates and 89% for postgraduates. The initial full time-salary was $77,000 for undergraduates and $107,200 for postgraduates.

=== Lecture series ===
==== Vincent Lingiari Memorial Lecture ====
The Vincent Lingiari Memorial Lectures were established in 1996 to commemorate the Wave Hill walk-off led by Gurindji Aboriginal rights activist Vincent Lingiari in August 1966. Held annually at the Casuarina campus amphitheatre and open to the public, the lecture now forms part of the Gurindji's annual Freedom Day Festival. Former Governor-General William Deane, former prime ministers Gough Whitlam and Malcolm Fraser, Indigenous rights activist Galarrwuy Yunupingu, former senator and Indigenous rights activist Patrick Dodson, and writer and Indigenous rights activist Marcia Langton have all presented lectures. In 2022, Torres Strait Islander human rights campaigner Thomas Mayo, a signatory on the Uluru Statement from the Heart and an advocate for the proposed Indigenous Voice to Parliament, delivered the oration. He drew parallels between Lingiari's struggle to what Indigenous peoples of Australia are experiencing.

== Student life ==
=== Student demographics ===
Charles Darwin University's 2024 annual report shows enrolments totaled 28,535, with 8,870 students enrolled in vocational and educational training courses and 12,846 enrolled in higher education.

=== Student union ===
The CDU Student Council represents undergraduate students while the CDU Postgraduate Student Association, a member of the Council of Australian Postgraduate Associations, represents postgraduate students. Multiple student associations also exist for the individual schools, including the CDU Law Students' Society, and the CDU Business Students' Association. These student groups offer academic, career and professional support to their members, as well as organising social events throughout the year.

=== Student media and radio ===
104.1 Territory FM is a community radio station broadcasting via an ACMA community radio licence held by CDU. It is based at the Danala | Education and Community Centre campus in central Darwin and is broadcast on 104.1 to Darwin and surrounds, including Palmerston, and on the DAB+ digital radio platform.

== See also ==
- List of universities in Australia
- Azzurri United FC
