= David Angel (judge) =

Australian judge (1944–1989)

David Norman Angel KC (born 5 July 1944) was a judge of the Supreme Court of the Northern Territory, Australia. He was appointed to the court on 8 May 1989. Justice Angel retired on 20 January 2010. At the time of his retirement, he was the Northern Territory's longest serving resident judge.

Justice Angel was educated at Prince Alfred College in South Australia and later attended the University of Adelaide. He was admitted to the South Australian Bar in 1967 and practised as a partner with the Adelaide law firm of Piper, Bakewell and Piper until 1974. In 1975 Angel joined the South Australian Independent Bar, where he remained until taking up his appointment on the Northern Territory Supreme Court bench. He was appointed as a Queen's Counsel in 1981.

Justice Angel was President of the South Australian Bar Association (1988–89) and Chairman of the South Australian Parole Board (1982–84). He was also a Council Member of the South Australian Law Society, a member of the South Australian Disciplinary Tribunal and a member of the South Australian Supreme Court Admissions Board. He is also a member of the Governing Council of the Judicial Conference of Australia.

On 24 May 2010, he was granted the title "Honourable" for life.
