= List of Monash University people =

A list of Monash University people, including a number of notable alumni and staff.

== Notable alumni ==
=== Politics and government ===
- Daniel Andrews – 48th Premier of Victoria
- Kevin Andrews – former Australian Defence Minister
- Louise Asher – former Deputy Leader of the Victorian Liberal Party
- Jim Bacon – former Premier of Tasmania (did not graduate)
- Adam Bandt – Federal Member of Parliament for the Australian Greens; first Green elected to Federal Parliament at a general election
- Boediono – former vice president of Indonesia
- Sue Boyce – Australian senator
- Andrew Brideson – former member of the Parliament of Victoria
- Helen Buckingham – former member of the Parliament of Victoria
- Anna Burke – politician, former Deputy Speaker of the Australian House of Representatives
- Josh Burns – Federal Member for Macnamara Parliament of Australia
- Elaine Carbines – former member of the Parliament of Victoria
- Peter Cleeland – former member of the Australian House of Representatives
- Jacinta Collins – Australian senator
- Ann Corcoran – Member of the Australian House of Representatives
- Peter Costello – longest-serving Treasurer of Australia; former Deputy Leader of the Liberal Party of Australia
- Simon Crean – Australian Minister for Trade; former Leader of the Opposition and Leader of the ALP
- David de Kretser – medical researcher; former governor of Victoria
- John Delzoppo – former speaker of the Parliament of Victoria
- Richard Di Natale – Leader of the Australian Greens, senator for Victoria
- Robert Doyle – former Leader of the Opposition in Victoria and Leader of the Victorian Liberal Party; former Lord Mayor of Melbourne
- John Elferink – Northern Territory Shadow Treasurer
- Peter Falconer – Member of the Australian House of Representatives
- David Feeney – Member of the Australian House of Representatives
- Jeannie Ferris – Australian senator
- Gail Gago – South Australian Minister for Environment, Conservation and Mental Health
- Carina Garland – Federal Member for Chisholm Parliament of Australia
- James Gomez – Singaporean politician and academic at Monash
- Alan Griffiths – former Australian Minister for Industry and Resources
- Peter Hall – Member of the Parliament of Victoria
- Alistair Harkness – Member of the Parliament of Victoria, political commentator
- Carolyn Hirsh – former member of the Parliament of Victoria
- Rob Hudson – Member of the Parliament of Victoria
- Dennis Jensen – Member of the Australian House of Representatives
- Gary Johns – former Special Minister of State, academic
- Michael Kroger – Liberal Party of Australia powerbroker and businessman
- Norman Lacy – former Minister for Arts and Minister for Educational Services
- Albert Langer – political activist
- John Langmore – former member of the Australian House of Representatives; Director of Social Policy and Development at the United Nations; academic
- John Lenders – Victorian Treasurer; Victoria's longest-serving Finance Minister
- Lim Guan Eng – Malaysian politician; former finance minister of Malaysia
- Hong Lim – Member of the Parliament of Victoria
- Lorna Lippmann, campaigner for the rights of Aboriginal Australians
- Tony Lupton – Member of the Parliament of Victoria; Secretary of Cabinet under John Brumby
- Julian McGauran – Former Australian senator
- Marlene Moses – diplomat, Foreign Minister of Nauru
- Lauren Moss – Member of the Northern Territory Parliament
- Simbarashe Mumbengegwi – former foreign minister of Zimbabwe
- Janice Munt – Member of the Parliament of Victoria
- Brendan O'Connor – former Australian Minister for Home Affairs and Employment, now Opposition Cabinet member
- Gavan O'Connor – former member of the Australian House of Representatives
- Neil O'Keefe – former member of the Australian House of Representatives
- Clare O'Neil – Member of the Australian House of Representatives for Hotham; former mayor of the City of Greater Dandenong; youngest female mayor in Australian history
- Martin Pakula – Attorney General of Victoria
- John Pandazopoulos – former Victorian Minister for Employment and Major Projects
- Kay Patterson – former Australian senator; former Minister for Health
- Chris Pearce – Member of the Australian House of Representatives
- Sue Pennicuik – Greens Member of the Parliament of Victoria
- Victor Perton – former member of the Parliament of Victoria
- Inga Peulich – Member of the Parliament of Victoria
- Robert Ray – Australian senator; former Defence Minister
- Peter Reith – Executive Director of the European Bank for Reconstruction and Development; former Defence Minister; former Minister for Workplace Relations
- Gordon Rich-Phillips – Shadow Victorian finance minister
- Tony Robinson – Victorian Minister for Consumer Affairs and Gaming
- Bill Shorten – Federal Opposition leader, Member of the Australian House of Representatives; former National Secretary of the Australian Workers' Union; President of the Victorian ALP
- Helen Silver – public servant; Secretary of the Victorian Department of Premier and Cabinet
- Adem Somyurek – Member of the Parliament of Victoria
- Sharman Stone – former Australian Minister for Workforce Participation, former Shadow Minister for Immigration
- Kirsty Sword Gusmão – political activist; former first lady of East Timor
- Murray Thompson – Member of the Parliament of Victoria
- John Thwaites – former Deputy Premier of Victoria; Minister for Environment, Water and Climate Change
- David Vigor – Australian senator
- Nick Wakeling – Member of the Parliament of Victoria
- Don Watson – speechwriter to Paul Keating, author
- Graeme Weideman – former Victorian Minister for Tourism
- Dean Wells – former Attorney-General of Queensland; Minister for Education and Minister for the Environment
- Steve Wettenhall – Member of the Parliament of Queensland
- Greg Wilton (1955–2000) – Member of the Australian House of Representatives
- Michael Wooldridge – former Australian Minister for Health and Chairman of UNAIDS
- Luke Lazarus Arnold – Australian High Commissioner to Brunei

=== Law ===
- Greg Barns – barrister and political commentator
- Kevin Bell – Justice of the Supreme Court of Victoria; current president of the Victorian Civil and Administrative Tribunal (VCAT)
- Diana Bryant – current Chief Justice of the Family Court of Australia
- Julian Burnside, KC – high-profile barrister; human rights advocate; author; one of the Australian Living Treasures
- Paul Cronin – Justice of the Family Court of Australia
- Tom Danos – high-profile barrister; Treasurer of the Victorian Criminal Bar Association; defence lawyer in the Keith William Allan murder trial
- Raymond Finkelstein – Justice of the Federal Court of Australia
- Ian Gray – current Chief Magistrate, Magistrates' Court of Victoria
- Felicity Hampel – human rights lawyer; Judge of the County Court of Victoria
- Peter Hayes QC – high-profile barrister
- Peter Hogg – constitutional law scholar
- Graeme Johnstone – current State Coroner of Victoria
- Murray Kellam – Justice of the Supreme Court of Victoria;first president of VCAT
- Ron McCallum – legal scholar specialising in industrial law
- Francine McNiff – legal scholar, and first woman state magistrate in Victoria
- Lex Lasry KC – high-profile barrister, chairman of the Victorian Criminal Bar Association; human rights advocate; Justice of the Supreme Court of Victoria
- Stuart Morris – Justice of the Supreme Court of Victoria; former president of VCAT
- Ross Ray – current president of the Law Council of Australia
- Neil Rees – current chairman of the Victorian Law Reform Commission; foundation Dean of the University of Newcastle Law School
- Michael Rozenes – current chief judge of the County Court of Victoria
- Pamela Tate – current solicitor-general of Victoria
- Mark Weinberg – Justice of the Federal Court of Australia; former Commonwealth Director of Public Prosecutions; current chief justice of Norfolk Island

=== Media and arts ===
- Rory Barnes – novelist
- Jean Bedford – novelist
- Peter Bonner – artist, winner of the Dobell Prize
- Damien Broderick – author, futurist
- Peter Carey – Booker Prize-winning novelist
- Nick Cave – musician
- Doug Chappel – comedian actor
- Tim Charles – musician
- Timothy Conigrave (1959–1994) – actor and writer
- Peter Corris – crime fiction author
- Dagmar Evelyn Cyrulla – artist
- Andrew Daddo – actor, voice artist, author and television personality
- Cecilia Dart-Thornton – author
- Lindy Davies – actor; dean of the Victorian College of Arts
- Cherie Ditcham – actress, model
- Laurie Duggan – poet
- Hazel Edwards – children's author
- Jon Faine – Melbourne radio personality
- Phillip Frazer – publisher
- Max Gillies – actor and satirist
- Andy Griffiths – children's author
- John Griffiths – musician and musicologist
- Yalda Hakim – journalist
- Deborah Halpern – sculptor
- Mark Holden – singer, actor, television personality and barrister
- Leslie Howard – pianist and composer
- Russel Howcroft – advertiser, media personality and Executive general manager of Network Ten
- Paul Jennings – children's author
- Adib Khan – novelist
- Lucy Kiraly – fashion model and television presenter
- Michael Leunig – cartoonist
- Campbell McComas – comedian and actor
- Brenda Niall – author
- Nikolai Nikolaeff – actor
- Eva Orner – Academy-Award-winning film producer
- Boyd Oxlade – author of Death in Brunswick
- Charlie Pickering – comedian
- Ben Quilty – artist
- Apsara Reddy – journalist
- John Romeril – playwright
- Raghav Sachar – Indian singer-songwriter
- John A. Scott – poet
- Alyssa Soebandono - actress
- Fiona Spence – actress, star of Prisoner
- Jo Stanley – radio personality
- Stelarc – performance artist
- Yumi Stynes – radio and television personality
- Lucy Sussex – author
- Matt Tilley – comedian
- Mary Tonkin – artist, winner of the Dobell Prize
- Paul Yore – artist
- Don Watson – author
- Alan Wearne – poet
- Ilka White – textile artist
- David Williamson – playwright
- Shaun Wilson – artist
- Wendy Zukerman – podcast personality, science journalist

=== Business ===
- Fiona Balfour – businesswoman, former Qantas and Telstra executive
- John F. O. Bilson – economist
- Mark Birrell – company director; former Minister for Industry, Science and Technology
- Terry Budge – banking executive, former Chancellor of Murdoch University
- Tony D'Aloisio – Chairman, Australian Securities & Investments Commission; former CEO, Australian Securities Exchange
- Henry Ergas – economist
- John A. Fraser – Chairman and CEO of Global Asset Management at UBS; former Deputy Secretary of the Australian Treasury
- Josh Frydenberg – Treasurer of Australia
- Peter Ivany – media mogul and billionaire
- Margaret Jackson – first female Chairman of Qantas
- Ruslan Kogan – founder and CEO of Australia's biggest online retailer Kogan.com; co-founder of Milan Direct
- Michael Kroger – Liberal Party of Australia powerbroker and businessman
- Tan Le – technology businesswoman, Young Australian of the Year
- Peter Lew – businessman
- Michael Luscombe – CEO and managing director, Woolworths
- Ian Macfarlane – economist, Governor of the Reserve Bank of Australia (1996–2006)
- Paresh Narayan – economist
- Trevor O'Hoy – President and CEO, Foster's Group
- Pasuk Phongpaichit – economist, author, anti-corruption campaigner; recipient of the 1999/2000 Monash University Distinguished Alumni Award
- Peter Reith – Executive Director of the European Bank for Reconstruction & Development
- Gary P. Sampson – World Trade Organization economist
- Graeme Samuel – Chairman of the Australian Competition & Consumer Commission
- Anna Skarbek – businesswoman and former investment banker
- Jannie Tay – Executive vice-chairman and co-founder of the Hour Glass; recipient of the 2003 Monash University Distinguished Alumni Award

=== Medicine and science ===
- Mel Herbert – emergency physician; founder of EM:RAP; medical consultant and writer for the HBO Max series The Pitt; author of The Extraordinary Power of Being Average
- Yahya Awang – cardiothoracic surgeon; performed the first heart transplant in Malaysia
- Greg Ayers – atmospheric scientist, former director of the Australian Bureau of Meteorology
- David Brown – meteorologist, Seven News weatherman
- Michael Cowley – physiologist, Australian Science Minister's Life Scientist of the Year 2009
- David de Kretser – medical researcher, former governor of Victoria
- Weary Dunlop – military surgeon, World War II leader (attended the Victorian College of Pharmacy, now Monash Parkville Campus)
- Ian G. Enting – mathematician
- Mark Febbraio - physiologist
- Tim Flannery – biologist, author, 2007 Australian of the Year
- Kristine French – plant biologist and conservationist
- Peter Gibson – gastroenterologist who created the Low-FODMAP diet in collaboration with Susan Shepherd
- Susan Lim – surgeon, performed Singapore's first successful liver transplant; recipient of the 2005 Monash University Distinguished Alumni Award
- John Mattick – Executive Director of the Garvan Institute of Medical Research in Sydney, whose research led to the discovery of the function of non-coding DNA
- Patrick McGorry – psychiatrist, 2010 Australian of the Year
- Dr Brad McKay – doctor, author and science communicator
- Jared Purton (1976–2009) – immunologist
- Abdul Rozali-Wathooth – pioneering Malaysian cardiothoracic surgeon
- Terry Speed – mathematician
- Abu Bakar Suleiman – Vice-Chancellor of International Medical University; recipient of the 2007 Monash University Distinguished Alumni Award
- James Toouli – surgeon
- Norman Arthur Wakefield – botanist
- Lynne Kelly – researcher and science educator
- Charles Clarke – botanist

=== Social services and academia ===
- Beng Chin Ooi – Singaporean computer scientist and academic， Fellow of ACM, Fellow of IEEE.
- Phillip Aspinall – Head of the Anglican Church of Australia
- Diane Bell – anthropologist
- Gidon Bromberg – environmentalist
- Karen Burns – architectural historian
- Michael Clyne – linguist
- Anthony G. Collins – President of Clarkson University
- Tim Costello – humanitarian, CEO of World Vision Australia, listed as one of the Australian Living Treasures
- Mick Dodson – indigenous rights campaigner; Convenor of the ANU Institute for Indigenous Australia; one of the Australian Living Treasures; 2009 Australian of the Year
- Harriet Edquist – architectural historian
- Hugh Evans – 2004 Young Australian of the Year, philanthropist
- Ben Kiernan – leading researcher in the study of genocide
- Peter Leslie Lee – Vice-Chancellor of Southern Cross University
- Stuart Macintyre – historian
- Ron McCallum – Labour law scholar
- Simon Molesworth KC, Chairman of the Australian Council of National Trusts
- Justin Oakley – philosopher
- Neil Rees – foundation Dean of the University of Newcastle Law School
- James Mahmud Rice – sociologist
- Julian Savulescu – Uehiro Professor of Practical Ethics at the University of Oxford
- Andrekos Varnava – historian, writer, and professor at Flinders University
- Brian Weatherson – philosopher
- Beth Wilson – Victorian Health Services Commissioner

=== Sport ===
- Catherine Arlove – Olympic judo competitor
- John Bertrand – yachtsman, skipper of Australia II
- Mordy Bromberg – former AFL footballer, barrister, current Judge of the Federal Court of Australia
- Travis Brooks – field hockey player, Olympic Games gold medallist
- Ashley Brown (born 1994) – footballer
- Nathan Burke – AFL footballer
- Alastair Clarkson – former AFL footballer, current Coach of the North Melbourne Football Club
- Tony Dodemaide – cricketer
- Ron Evans – AFL footballer and sports administrator
- Robby Foldvari – billiards and snooker player, world champion
- Brett Gosper – former member of the Australia national under-21 rugby union team; current CEO of the International Rugby Board
- Geoff Grover – former AFL and VFA footballer; VFA interstate representative (1966 Hobart Carnival)
- Lauren Hewitt – athlete
- Geoff Hunt – squash player, four-time world champion
- Janine Ilitch – netballer
- Alexandra Kiroi-Bogatyreva (born 2002) - Olympic rhythmic gymnast
- Paul McNamee – tennis player, sports administrator, winner of Wimbledon and Australian Open
- Anna Millward, née Wilson – cyclist, world champion and world record holder
- Brenton Rickard – swimmer, Olympic silver medallist
- Anna Segal – Olympic freestyle skier and 2-time world champion
- Paul Trimboli – soccer player
- David Zalcberg – Olympic table tennis player, Commonwealth Games medallist

== Notable staff (past and present) ==
=== Creative arts ===
- Dorothy Auchterlonie – writer and poet
- Trevor Barnard – pianist
- Janine Burke – author, novelist, art historian
- Kevin Hart – poet and literary critic
- Adrian Martin – film critic
- Brian Nelson – French literature expert and translator
- Jennifer Strauss – poet
- Mary Tonkin – artist, winner of the Dobell Prize

=== Humanities and social sciences ===
- Waleed Aly – Muslim community leader and political commentator
- Andrew Benjamin – philosopher
- Harold Bolitho – historian
- Geoffrey Bolton – historian
- John Brumby – former Premier of Victoria
- Kate Burridge – prominent linguist and occasional ABC presenter
- John Button – former Australian senator; Leader of the Australian Labor Party in the Senate; Australian Minister for Industry (1983–1993)
- David P. Chandler – historian
- Chin Liew Ten – philosopher
- Michael Clyne – linguist
- Ken Coghill – former speaker of the Parliament of Victoria
- Peter Costello – longest-serving treasurer of Australia; former deputy leader of the Liberal Party of Australia
- Franz-Josef Deiters – literary scholar
- Nick Economou – political scientist and media commentator
- Ben Eltham – creative producer and social commentator
- Herbert Feith – Indonesian politics expert
- Allan Fels – economist and former chairman of the Australian Competition & Consumer Commission
- John Edward Fletcher – German studies expert
- James Alexander Forrest – lawyer, former University Council member
- Petro Georgiou – former Liberal Member of the Parliament of Australia
- Fred Gruen – economist
- Rob J. Hyndman – statistician, forecaster
- Frank Cameron Jackson – philosopher
- Margaret J. Kartomi – ethnomusicologist
- David Kemp – political scientist; former Australian Minister for Education and the Environment
- Helga Kuhse – philosopher and bioethicist
- Andrew Linklater – international relations expert
- Mal Logan – geographer, former vice-chancellor
- Tony Lupton – former politician and secretary to the Victorian Cabinet, now professor of public policy
- Race Mathews – economist; chief of staff to Prime Minister Gough Whitlam; former Minister for Community Services; former Minister for Police and Emergency Services
- Yew-Kwang Ng – economist
- Graham Oppy – philosopher
- Kay Patterson – former Australian senator and Minister for Health
- Mark Peel – historian
- Christian Reus-Smit – international relations expert
- John Rickard – economist
- Modjtaba Sadria – philosopher
- Richard Scotton – health economist, creator of Australian Medicare program
- Kamal Uddin Siddiqui – economist, diplomat
- Peter Singer – philosopher (now at Princeton University, US)
- J. J. C. Smart – philosopher
- Michael A. Smith – philosopher
- John Thwaites – former Deputy Premier of Victoria and Minister for Environment, Water and Climate Change, now Chair of the Monash Sustainability Institute
- Nick Trakakis – philosopher
- Hal Varian – economist
- David Wright-Neville – political scientist, terrorism expert
- Xiaokai Yang – economist, democracy campaigner, political prisoner
- Lara Owen – organisational studies, menstrual expert

=== Law ===
- Bob Baxt – lawyer, former chairman of the Trade Practices Commission (now ACCC)
- Enid Campbell – jurist
- David Derham – jurist
- Raymond Finkelstein – Justice of the Federal Court of Australia
- Arie Freiberg – Chairman of the Victorian Sentencing Advisory Council
- George Hampel, QC – former Justice of the Supreme Court of Victoria; leading advocacy instructor
- Felicity Hampel, SC – judge of the County Court of Victoria; human rights lawyer
- Peter Heerey – Justice of the Federal Court of Australia
- Sarah Joseph – human rights scholar
- Marcia Neave – Justice of the Supreme Court of Victoria
- Stephen John Parker – jurist
- Mahadev Shankar – Malaysian Court of Appeal Judge
- Louis Waller – medical and criminal law expert
- Christopher Weeramantry – Judge and Vice-President of the International Court of Justice; human rights advocate

=== Medicine and life sciences ===
- Bill Charman – pharmaceutical scientist
- Michael Cowley – physiologist; Australian Science Minister's Life Scientist of the Year 2009
- Jo Douglass – medical researcher and academic, Officer of the Order of Australia
- Dorothy Jean Hailes – medical practitioner
- David de Kretser – medical researcher; current governor of Victoria
- Basil Hetzel – medical researcher, public health advocate, listed as one of the Australian Living Treasures
- Frederic Jevons – biochemist
- Richard Larkins – medical researcher; former Monash University Vice-Chancellor
- Barrie Marmion – Foundation Professor of Microbiology (1963–68)
- A.T.S Sissons – pharmaceutical scientist
- Elsdon Storey – neurologist
- Alan O. Trounson – biologist, IVF pioneer and stem cell researcher
- Joanna Tully – forensic paediatrician; deputy director of the Victorian Forensic Paediatric Medical Service at the Royal Children's and Monash Children's hospitals
- Carl Wood – IVF pioneer

=== Physical sciences ===
- Robert Bartnik – mathematician
- Jim Breen – computer scientist, known for his work on Japanese dictionary projects
- Damian Conway – computer scientist, Perl
- John Crossley – mathematician
- John Michael Cullen – ornithologist
- Vicki Gardiner – chemical engineer
- Richard Gunstone – physicist
- Kenneth H. Hunt – kinematics expert
- Vit Klemes – hydrologist
- Gilah Leder – mathematics education
- David McCarthy – civil engineer, urban hydrologist
- Raymond Martin – chemical scientist, former vice-chancellor
- Louis Matheson – engineer, foundation vice-chancellor
- Louis Moresi – geophysicist
- Graeme Pearman – climate change scientist
- Andrew Prentice – mathematician
- Zenon J Pudlowski – engineering expert
- John Stillwell – mathematician
- Chris Wallace – computer scientist
- Les William – physical instrumentation

== Administration ==
=== Vice-Chancellors ===
Note: After 1990, the Vice-Chancellor was also given the additional title of President.

| No. | Portrait | Vice-Chancellor | Held Office | Notes | Ref. |
|---|---|---|---|---|---|
| 1 | | Louis Matheson | 1960–1976 | civil engineer | |
| 2 | | William Alexander Gowdie Scott | 1976–1977 | English literature | |
| 3 | | Raymond Martin | 1977–1987 | inorganic chemist | |
| 4 | | Mal Logan | 1987–1996 | urban planner and academic administrator | |
| 5 | | David Robinson | 1997–2002 | Controversial figure that was forced to resign in 2002 over alleged cases of plagiarism that he was accused to have committed during the 1970s and 1980s. | |
| 6 | | Peter Darvall | 2002–2003 | academic, civil engineer | |
| 7 | | Richard Larkins | 2003–2009 | physician, Order of Australia | |
| 8 | | Ed Byrne | 2009–2014 | neuroscientist | |
| 9 | | Margaret Gardner | 2014–2023 | industrial relations specialist, 30th Governor of Victoria | |
| 10 | | Sharon Pickering | 2024–present | social scientist | |

=== Chancellors ===
| No. | Portrait | Chancellor | Held Office | Notes | Ref. |
|---|---|---|---|---|---|
| 1 | | Robert Blackwood | 1958–1968 | engineer | |
| 2 | | Douglas Menzies | 1968–1974 | judge | |
| 3 | | Richard Moulton Eggleston | 1975–1983 | judge | |
| 4 | | George Lush | 1983–1992 | judge | |
| 5 | | David William Rogers | 1992–1998 | lawyer | |
| 6 | | Jeremy (Jerry) Ellis | 1999–2007 | mining entrepreneur | |
| 7 | | Alan Finkel | 2008–2016 | 8th Chief Scientist of Australia, neuroscientist | |
| 8 | | Simon McKeon | 2016–present | lawyer | |
