= Deiters =

Deiters is a surname. Notable people with the surname include:

- Franz-Josef Deiters, German-born Australian literary scholar, associate professor in German Studies at Monash University
- Hermann Deiters (1833–1907), writer about music and educator
- Julie Deiters (born 1975), France-born Dutch field hockey player
- Otto Deiters (1834–1863), German neuroanatomist
- Peter Franz Ignaz Deiters (1804–1861), German lawyer and member of the 1848 Frankfurt Parliament
