= Science tourism =

Travel to notable science locations

Science tourism is a type of recreational travel for people seeking scientific understanding or doing scientific research. It covers interests in visiting and exploring scientific landmarks, including science museums, laboratories, observatories and universities.

It also includes visits to see events of scientific interest, such as solar eclipses. A laboratory is a workplace and many have ongoing scientific research. They may not be open to the general public, or may only offer occasional special opportunities for public access. Many observatories are open to the public at regular hours, and have tours showcasing their astronomical research.

== Overview ==
Science tourism is a form of leisure travel in which visitors seek scientific understanding or conduct scientific research. Science tourism is commonly viewed as a specialized subset of other tourism categories, including adventure travel, cultural tourism, ecotourism, educational tourism, international volunteering, and nature tourism. Groups that offer science tourism experiences include tour guides, national parks, research institutes, and museums. Visitors go on science tourism trips for personal development and learning.

Science tourists may travel to places that showcase science or where scientifically important occurrences happened. Some scientific tourism sites include the Galápagos Islands, where Charles Darwin researched, the Kennedy Space Center, which includes NASA's launch facilities, and CERN, the biggest particle physics facility globally. Travelers may also stop at the memorials, gravesites, and previous residences of notable scientists including Albert Einstein, Alan Turing, Isaac Newton, Marie Curie, and Nikola Tesla.

== See also ==
- Archaeological sites
- Ecotourism
- Geotourism
- Industrial tourism
- List of astronomical observatories
- List of science museums
- Nuclear tourism
- Paleontology
- Protected areas
- Science park
- Wildlife observation

== Works cited ==
- Lundberg, Erik; Persson, Maria; Jernsand, Eva Maria (2022). "Science tourism: A conceptual development". Tourism, Knowledge and Learning. Abingdon, Oxon: Routledge. pp. 26–39. doi:10.4324/9781003293316-3. ISBN 978-1-032-27488-1.
- Packer, Jan (2015). "Science Tourism". In Gunstone, Richard (ed.). Encyclopedia of Science Education. Dordrecht: Springer Science+Business Media. pp. 930–932. doi:10.1007/978-94-007-2150-0_337. ISBN 978-94-007-2150-0.
- Räikkönen, Juulia; Grénman, Miia; Rouhiainen, Henna; Honkanen, Antti; Sääksjärvi, Ilari E (2021). "Conceptualizing nature-based science tourism: a case study of Seili Island, Finland". Journal of Sustainable Tourism. 31. doi:10.1080/09669582.2021.1948553.
