= Quantitative pharmacology =

Quantitative Pharmacology (QP), or Quantitative Systems Pharmacology (QSP), is an organized approach integrating individuals from different disciplines in a combined effort to develop quantitative models in order to solve specific, complex, and multivariate problems in drug development. QP translates the relationship(s) between disease, drug action, and individual variability into improved patient outcomes by leveraging improved teamwork and collaboration to enable quantitative decision-making processes from early discovery to late-stage development. QP encourages more transparent and objective study designs, as well as more data-driven risk-taking to optimize timelines, analyses, and decision-making, resulting in greater efficiency in the drug development process.
