= Henne Holstege =

Dutch researcher

- Holstege in 2016
- Born: 14 November 1975 (age 50); Rotterdam
- Education: Leiden University; Netherlands Cancer Institute
- Scientific career
- Workplaces: University of Amsterdam; Amsterdam University Medical Center
- Thesis: Characterization of the mouse and human breast cancer genome (2010)

Henne Holstege (born 14 November 1975) is a Dutch researcher who is an associate professor in the Department of Human Genetics at Amsterdam University Medical Center. She works at the Alzheimer Center Amsterdam and is affiliated with the Delft Bioinformatics Lab at Delft University of Technology. Her research has examined genetic factors associated with an increased risk of cognitive decline, as well as factors that may contribute to maintaining high levels of cognitive function into extreme old age.

== Early life and education ==
Holstege studied biochemistry at Leiden University. During her studies, she spent a year at Harvard University, where she investigated the molecular mechanisms involved in satiety. She later completed a PhD at the Netherlands Cancer Institute, researching somatic genetic alterations associated with the development of breast cancer. Following her doctorate, Holstege shifted her research focus from cancer genetics to the molecular genetics of ageing and neurodegeneration.

== Research and career ==
Hostege looks to identify the biological mechanisms of healthy cognitive ageing. Her research combines genetic, proteomic, immunological and neuropathological data to investigate why some people avoid or delay cognitive decline. Her findings suggest that cognitively healthy centenarians carry a greater proportion of protective genetic variants and fewer variants associated with Alzheimer's disease risk. She established the 100-plus study, a longitudinal cohort study of cognitively healthy centenarians, their first-degree relatives and their partners. Participants undergo neuropsychological and physical assessments, provide blood samples for genetic and biomarker analyses, and may also participate in brain imaging, microbiome research, induced pluripotent stem-cell studies and post-mortem brain donation. Her research on cognitive ageing was partly inspired by Hendrikje van Andel-Schipper, a Dutch woman who died at 115 without symptoms of cognitive decline. The case contributed to Holstege's interest in the genetic and biological factors that may protect against Alzheimer's disease and preserve cognitive function into extreme old age.

Holstege has studied rare variants of the SORL1 gene. SORL1 encodes a protein involved in transporting proteins within cells, including between the endolysosomal system, the cell surface and the trans-Golgi network. Disruption of this process may result in the accumulation of material within cellular vesicles and contribute to neuronal dysfunction.

In 2026, Holstege was awarded £1.5m from Alzheimer's Research UK and Gates Ventures to study how people maintain cognitive function into old age. The EMERALD (Epigenomic Mechanisms of Extreme Resilience and APOE Liability in Dementia) project investigates why some people remain cognitively healthy into extreme old age despite genetic risk factors or Alzheimer's-related brain pathology. Using brain tissue from cognitively healthy centenarians in the 100-plus Study, researchers will examine gene regulation across several brain-cell types to identify protective mechanisms that may inform new approaches to preventing or delaying dementia.

== Selected publications ==
- Céline Bellenguez; Fahri Küçükali; Iris E Jansen; et al. (2022). "New insights into the genetic etiology of Alzheimer's disease and related dementias". Nature Genetics. 54 (4): 412–436. doi:10.1038/s41588-022-01024-z. PMC 9005347. PMID 35379992. Wikidata Q123550392.
- Heisler, Lora; Cowley, Michael Alexander; Laurence H Tecott; et al. (2002). "Activation of central melanocortin pathways by fenfluramine". Science. 297 (5581): 609–611. doi:10.1126/science.1072327. PMID 12142539. Wikidata Q44079737.
- Heisler, Lora; Cowley, Michael Alexander; Laurence H Tecott; et al. (2002). "Activation of central melanocortin pathways by fenfluramine". Science. 297 (5581): 609–611. doi:10.1126/science.1072327. PMID 12142539. Wikidata Q44079737.

== Personal life ==
Holstege has three daughters.
