= Deeter =

Deeter is a surname. Notable people with the surname include:

- Jasper Deeter, American-born stage and film actor, stage director
- Karl Deeter, American-Irish entrepreneur
- Kellie Deeter, American politician

== See also ==
- Deiters
