= Parkville campus =

Parkville campus may refer to:

- Monash University, Parkville campus, Victoria, Australia
- Parkville Campus (University of Melbourne), Victoria, Australia
