= Neil Rees =

Neil Rees may refer to:

- Neil Rees (legal scholar)
- Neil Rees (bowls)
