= Arthur Christopoulos =

Australian pharmacologist and toxicologist

Arthur Christopoulos is an Australian pharmacologist. He is a Professor of Analytical Pharmacology at Monash University. He was a Councillor of the International Union of Basic and Clinical Pharmacology from 2018 to 2022. In 2019, he was appointed Dean of Monash University's Faculty of Pharmacy and Pharmaceutical Sciences and from 2021 to 2023, he served as the inaugural Director of Monash University's Neuromedicines Discovery Centre. He was elected a Fellow of the Australian Academy of Science in 2021.

== Early life ==
Christopoulos obtained a Bachelor of Pharmacy and his PhD from the Victorian College of Pharmacy, Monash University, and subsequently pursued postdoctoral studies in the Department of Neuroscience Research in Psychiatry, University of Minnesota, prior to returning to Australia to establish his laboratory within the Department of Pharmacology, University of Melbourne. In 2006, he moved to Monash University.

== Career ==
Arthur Christopoulos’ research focuses on allosteric mechanisms of drug action and signal-pathway biased agonism at G protein-coupled receptors (GPCRs) – the largest class of drug targets - and incorporates molecular pharmacology, computational and mathematical modeling, medicinal chemistry, structural and chemical biology, and animal models of behaviour. He has served on the Editorial Board of several scientific journals, including Molecular Pharmacology, the Journal of Pharmacology and Experimental Therapeutics, Pharmacological Reviews, ACS Chemical Neuroscience, the British Journal of Pharmacology and ACS Pharmacology and Translational Sciences. Prior to taking up his current position as Dean, Professor Christopoulos held a Senior Principal Research Fellowship of the National Health and Medical Research Council of Australia.

He is the recipient of numerous national and international awards, including the 2013 John J. Abel Award and the 2024 Goodman and Gilman Award from the American Society for Pharmacology and Experimental Therapeutics, the Rand Medal from the Australasian Society of Clinical and Experimental Pharmacologists and Toxicologists, the 2014 IUPHAR Analytical Pharmacology Lecturer, a 2015 Doctor of Laws (Honoris Causa) from the National and Kapodistrian University of Athens, Greece, the 2016 recipient of the Gaddum Memorial Award from the British Pharmacological Society and the 2016 GSK Award for Research Excellence. Since 2014, Clarivate Analytics has annually regularly named him a Highly Cited Researcher in Pharmacology and Toxicology. In 2021, Arthur was named a Highly Cited Researcher in both Pharmacology and Toxicology and Biology and Biochemistry categories. In 2017 he was elected a Fellow of the Australian Academy of Health and Medical Sciences, in 2018 he was elected as a Fellow of the British Pharmacological Society and in 2023 he was elected as a Fellow of the Pharmaceutical Society of Australia.

In 2022, Prof. Christopoulos was an academic co-founder of the GPCR biotech. startup, Septerna Inc.

== Personal life ==
Christopoulos is of Greek descent.

== Selected works ==
- Burger, W.A.C., Pham, V., Vuckovic, Z., Powers, A.S., Mobbs, J.I., Laloudakis, Y., Glukhova, A., Wootten, D., Tobin, A.B., Sexton, P.M., Paul, S.M., Felder, C.C., Danev, R., Dror, R.O., Christopoulos, A., Valant, C. and D.M. Thal (2023) Xanomeline displays concomitant orthosteric and allosteric binding modes at the M4 mAChR. Nature Comm. 14: 5440.
- Vuckovic, Z., Wang, J., Pham, V., Mobbs, J., Belousoff, M.T., Bhattarai, A., Nawaratne, V., Leach, K., Burger, W.A.C., van der Westhuizen, E.T., Khajehali, E., Thompson, G., Yeasmin, M., Liang, Y.L., Glukhova, A., Wootten, D., Lindsley, C.W., Tobin, A.B., Sexton, P.M., Danev, R., Valant, C., Miao, Y., Christopoulos, A and D.M. Thal (2023) Pharmacological hallmarks of allostery at the M4 muscarinic receptor elucidated through structure and dynamics. eLife 12: e83477.
- Cao, J., Belousoff, M.J., Liang, Y.L., Johnson, R.M., Josephs, T.M., Fletcher, M.M., Christopoulos, A., Hay, D.L., Danev, R., Wootten, D. and P.M. Sexton (2022) A structural basis for amylin receptor phenotype. Science 375: eabm9609.
- Draper-Joyce, C.J., Bhola, R., Wang, J., Bhattarai, A., Nguyen, A.T.N., Cowie-Kent, I., O’Sullivan, K., Chia, L.Y., Venugopal, H., Valant, C., Thal, D.M., Wootten, D., Panel, N., Carlsson, J., Christie, M.J., White, P.J., Scammells, P., May, L.T., Sexton, P.M., Danev, R., Miao, Y., Glukhova, A., Imlach, W.L. and A. Christopoulos (2021) Positive allosteric mechanisms of adenosine A1 receptor-mediated analgesia. Nature 597: 571-576.
- Josephs, T.M., Belousoff, M.J., Liang, Y.L., Piper, S.J., Cao, J., Garama, D.J., Leach, K., Gregory, K.J., Christopoulos, A., Hay, D.L., Danev, R., Wootten, D. and P.M. Sexton (2021) Structure and dynamics of the CGRP receptor in apo and peptide-bound forms. Science. 372: eabf7258.
- Bradley, S.J., Molloy, C., Valuskova, P., Dwomoh, L., Scarpa, M., Rossi, M., Finlayson, L., Svensson, K.A., Chernet, E., Barth, V.N., Gherbi, K., Sykes, D.A., Wilson, C., Mistry, R., Sexton, P.M., Christopoulos, A., Mogg, A.J., Rosethorne, E.M., Sakata, S., Challiss, R.A.J., M. Broad L. and A.B. Tobin (2020) Biased M1-muscarinic receptor-mutant mice inform the design of next generation drugs. Nature Chem. Biol. 16: 240–249.
- Liang, Y.-L., Belousoff, M.J., Fletcher, M., Zhang, X., Khoshouei, M., Deganutti, G., Koole, C., Furness, S.B.G., Miller, L.J., Hay, D.L., Christopoulos, A., Reynolds, C.A., Wootten, D., and P.M. Sexton (2020) Structure and dynamics of the adrenomedullin (AM) receptors, AM1 and AM2, reveals key mechanisms in the control of receptor phenotypes by RAMPs. Mol. Cell 77: 656–668.
- Zhao, P., Liang, Y.L., Belousoff, M.J., Deganutti, G., Fletcher, M.M., Willard, F.S., Sloop, K.W., Inoue, A., Truong, T.T., Clydesdale, L., Furness, S.G.B., Christopoulos, A., Wang, M.W., Miller, L.J., Reynolds, C.A., Danev, R., Sexton, P.M. and D. Wootten (2020) Activation of GLP-1 receptor by a non-peptide agonist. Nature 577: 432–436.
- Vuckovic, Z., Gentry, P.R., Berizzi, A. E., Hirata, K., Varghese, S., Thompson, G., van der Westhuizen, E.T., Burger, W.A.C., Rahmani, R., Valant, C., Langmead, C., Lindsley, C., Baell, J., Tobin, A.B., Sexton, P.M., Christopoulos A. and D.M. Thal (2019) Crystal structure of the M5 muscarinic acetylcholine receptor. Proc. Natl. Acad. Sci. (USA) 116: 26001–26007.
- Hollingsworth, S.A., Kelly, B., Valant, C., Michaelis, J.A., Mastromihalis, O., Thompson, G., Venkatakrishnan, A.J., Hertig, S., Scammells, P.J., Sexton, P.M., Felder, C.C., Christopoulos, A. and R. O. Dror (2019) Cryptic pocket formation underlies allosteric modulator selectivity at muscarinic GPCRs. Nature Comm. 10: 3289.
- Draper-Joyce, C.J., Khosouei, M., Thal. D.M., Liang, Y.L., Nguyen, A.T.N., Gurness, S.G.B., Venugopal, H., Baltos, J., Plitzko, J.P., Danev, R., Baumeisterm W., May, L.T., Wootten, D., Sexton, P.M., Glukhova, A. and A. Christopoulos (2018) Structure of the adenosine-bound human A1 receptor-G_{i} complex. Nature 558: 559–563.
- Harvey Motulsky, Arthur Christopoulos. Fitting Models to Biological Data Using Linear and Nonlinear Regression: A practical guide to curve fitting. Oxford University Press. 2004. ISBN 0-19-517179-9
- Liang, Y.L., Khoshouei, M., Deganuti, G., Glukhova, A., Koole, C., Peat, T.S., Radjainia, M., Plitzko, J.M., Baumeister, W., Miller, L.M., Hay, D.L., Christopoulos, A., Reynolds, C.A., Wootten, D. and P M. Sexton (2018) Cryo-EM structure of the active, G_{s}-protein complexed, human CGRP receptor. Nature 561: 492–497.
- Thal, D.M., Glukhova, A., Sexton P.M. and A. Christopoulos (2018) Structural insights into G-protein-coupled receptor allostery. Nature 559: 45–53.
- Berizzi, A., Perry, C., Shackleford, D., Lindsley, C., Jones, C., Chen, N., Sexton, P.M., Christopoulos, A., Langmead, C.J. and A.J. Lawrence (2018) Muscarinic M_{5} receptors modulate ethanol seeking in rats. Neuropsychopharmacol., 43: 1510-1517.
- Wootten, D., Christopoulos, A., Solano, M.M., Babu, M.M., and P.M. Sexton (2018) Mechanisms of signalling and bias in G-protein coupled receptors. Nat. Rev. Mol. Cell Biol. 19: 638–653.
- Korczynska, M., Clark, M.J., Valant, C., Moo, E.V., Abold, S., Weiss, D.R., Torosyan, H., Huang, W., Kruse, A.C., May, L.T., Baltos, J., Sexton, P.M., Kobilka, B.K., Christopoulos, A., Shoichet, B.K., and R.K. Sunahara (2018) Structure-based discovery of selective positive allosteric modulators of antagonists for the M_{2} muscarinic acetylcholine receptor. Proc. Natl. Acad. Sci. (USA) 115: E2419-E2428.
- Liang, Y.-L., Khosouei, M., Glukhova, A., Furness, S.G.B., Clydesdale, L., Koole, C., Troung, T.T., Thal, D.M., Lei, S., Radjainia, M., Danev, R., Baumeister, W., Wang, M.-W., Christopoulos, A., Sexton, P.M. and D. Wootten (2018) Phase-plate cryo-EM structure of a biased agonist-bound human GLP-1 receptor-G_{s} complex. Nature 555: 121–125.
- Liang, Y.L., Khoshouei, M., Radjainia, M., Zhang, Y., Glukhova, A., Tarrasch, J., Thal, D.M., Furness, S.G.B., Christopoulos, G., Coudrat, T., Danev, R., Baumeister, W., Miller, LJ., Christopoulos, A., Kobilka, B.K., Wootten, D., Skiniotis, G. and P.M. Sexton (2017) Phase-plate cryo-EM structure of a class B GPCR-G protein complex. Nature 546: 118–123.
- Glukhova, A., Thal, D.T., Nguyen, A.T.N., Vecchio, E.A., Jörg, M., Scammells, P.J., May, L.T., Sexton, P.M. and A. Christopoulos (2017) Structure of the adenosine A_{1} receptor reveals the basis for subtype selectivity. Cell 168: 867–877.
- Bradley, S.J., Bourgognon, J.-M., Sanger, H.E., Verity, N., Mogg, A., White, D.J., Butcher, A.J., Moreno, J.A., Molloy, C., Macedo-Hatch, T., Edwards, J.E., Wess, J., Pawlak, R., Read, D.J., Sexton, P.M., Broad, L.M., Steinert, J.R., Mallucci, G.R., Christopoulos, A., Felder, C.C. and A.B. Tobin (2017) M_{1}-muscarinic allosteric modulators slow prion neurodegeneration and restore memory loss. J. Clin. Invest. 127: 487–499.
- Lane, J.R., May, L.T., Parton, R.G., Sexton, P.M and A. Christopoulos (2017) A kinetic view of GPCR allostery and biased agonism. Nature Chem. Biol. 13: 929–937.
- Qin, R.C.X., May, L.T., Li, R., Cao, N., Rosli, S., Deo, M., Alexander, A.E., Horlock, D., Bourke, J.E., Yang, Y.H., Stewart, A.G., Kaye, D.M., Du, X.-J., Sexton, P.M., Christopoulos, A., Gao X.-M. and R. H. Ritchie (2017) Small-molecule biased formyl peptide receptor agonist Compound-17b protects against myocardial ischemia-reperfusion injury in mice. Nature Comm. 8: 14232.
- Furness, S.G.B., Liang, Y.-L., Nowell, C.J., Halls, M.L., Wookey, P.J., Dal Maso, E., Inoue, A., Christopoulos, A., Wootten, D. and P.M. Sexton (2016) Ligand-dependent modulation of G protein conformation alters drug efficacy. Cell. 167: 739–749.
- Miao, Y., Goldfeld, D., Moo, E.V., Sexton, P.M., Christopoulos, A., McCammon, A.J. and C. Valant (2016) Accelerated structure-based design of chemically diverse allosteric modulators of a muscarinic G protein-coupled receptor. Proc. Natl. Acad. Sci. (USA). 113: E5675-E5684.
- Wootten, D., Reynolds, C.A., Smith, K.J., Mobarec, J.C., Koole, C., Savage, E., Pabreja, K., Simms, J., Sridhar, R., Furness, S.G.B., Liu, M., Thompson, P.E., Miller, L.J., Christopoulos, A. and P.M. Sexton (2016) The GLP-1 receptor extracellular surface is a molecular trigger for biased agonism. Cell. 165: 1632–1643.
- Leach, K., Gregory, K.J., Kufareva, I., Khajehali, E., Cook, A.E., Abagyan, R., Conigrave, A.D., Sexton P.M. and A. Christopoulos (2016) Towards a structural understanding of allosteric drugs at the human calcium sensing receptor Cell Res. 26: 574–592.
- Klein Herenbrink, C., Sykes, D.A., Donthamsetti, P., Canals, M., Coudrat, T., Shonberg, J., Scammells, P.J., Capuano, B., Sexton, P.M., Charlton, S.J., Javitch, J.A., Christopoulos, A. and J.R. Lane (2016) The role of kinetic context in apparent biased agonism at GPCRs. Nature Comm. 7: 10842
- Thal, D.M., Sun, B., Feng_{,} D., Nawaratne, V., Leach, K., Felder, C.C., Bures, M.G., Evans, D.A., Weis, W.I., Bachhawat, P., Kobilka, T.S., Sexton, P.M., Kobilka, B.M. and A. Christopoulos (2015) Crystal structures of the M_{1} and M_{4} muscarinic acetylcholine receptors and insights into their allosteric modulation. Nature. 531: 335–340.
- Lane, J.R., Donthamsetti, P., Shonberg, J., Draper-Joyce, C.J., Dentry, S., Michino, M., Shi, L., López, L., Scammells, P.J., Capuano, B., Sexton, P.M., Javitch, J.A. and A. Christopoulos (2014) A new mechanism of allostery in a G protein-coupled receptor dimer. Nature Chem. Biol. 10: 745–752.
- Christopoulos, A., Changeux, J.P., Catterall, W.A., Fabbro, D., Burris, T.P., Cidlowski, J.A., Olsen, R.W., Peters, J.A., Neubig, R.R., Pin, J.P., Sexton, P.M., Kenakin, T.P., Ehlert, F.J., Spedding M. and C.J. Langmead (2014) International Union of Basic and Clinical Pharmacology. XC. Multi-site Pharmacology: Recommendations for the nomenclature of receptor allosterism and allosteric ligands. Pharmacol. Rev. 66: 918–947.
- Valant, C., May, L.T., Aurelio, L., Chuo, C.H., White, P.J., Baltos, J., Sexton, P.M., Scammells, P.J. and A. Christopoulos (2014) Separation of on-target efficacy from adverse effects through rational design of a bitopic adenosine receptor agonist. Proc. Natl. Acad. Sci. (USA)111: 4614–4619.
- Kruse, A.C., Kobilka, B.K., Gautam, D., Sexton, P.M., Christopoulos, A. and J., Wess (2014) Insights into muscarinic acetylcholine receptor biology, pharmacology, and structure. Nature Rev. Drug Discovery, 13: 549–560.
- Dror, R.O., Green, H.F., Valant, C., Borhani, D.W., Valcourt, J.R., Pan, A.C., Arlow, D.H., Canals, M., Lane, J.R., Rahmani, R., Baell, J.B., Sexton, P.M., Christopoulos, A. and D.E. Shaw (2013) Structural basis for modulation of a G-protein-coupled receptor by allosteric drugs. Nature. 503: 295-299
- Kruse, A.C., Ring, A.M., Manglik, A., Hu, J., Hu, K., Eitel, K., Hübner, H., Pardon, E., Valant, C., Sexton, P.M., Christopoulos, A., Felder, C.C., Gmeiner, P., Steyert, J., Weiss, W.I., Garcia, K.C., Wess, J. and B.K. Kobilka (2013) Activation and allosteric modulation of a muscarinic acetylcholine receptor. Nature. 504: 101–106.
- Mistry, S., Valant, C., Sexton, P., Capuano, B., Christopoulos, A. and P.J. Scammells (2013) Synthesis and pharmacological profiling of analogues of BQCA as allosteric modulators of the M_{1} muscarinic receptor. J. Med. Chem. 56: 5151–5172.
- Leach, K., Wen, A., Cook, A.E., Sexton, P.M., Conigrave, A.D, and A. Christopoulos (2013) Impact of clinically relevant mutations on the pharmacoregulation and signaling bias of the calcium sensing receptor by positive and negative allosteric modulators. Endocrinology 154: 1105–1116.
- Gregory, K.J., Sexton, P.M., Tobin, A.B. and A. Christopoulos (2012) Stimulus bias provides evidence for conformational constraints in the structure of a G protein-coupled receptor. J. Biol. Chem. 287: 37066–37077.
- Kenakin, T., Watson, C., Muniz-Medina, V. and A. Christopoulos (with Appendix by S. Watson) (2012) A simple method to quantify functional selectivity and agonist bias. ACS Chem. Neurosci. 3: 193-203
- Wootten D., Savage E.E., Valant C., May L.T., Sloop K.W., Ficorilli J., Showalter A.D., Willard F.S., Christopoulos A. and P.M. Sexton. Allosteric modulation of endogenous metabolites as an avenue for drug discovery. Mol Pharmacol., 2012, 82(2):281-90.
- Valant, C., Felder, C.C., Sexton, P.M. and A. Christopoulos (2012) Probe-dependence in the allosteric modulation of a G protein-coupled receptor: Implications for detection and validation of allosteric ligand effects. Mol. Pharmacol. 81: 41–52.
- Canals, M., Lane, J.R., Wen, A., Scammells, P.J., Sexton, P.M. and A. Christopoulos (2012) A Monod-Wyman-Changeux mechanism can explain G protein-coupled receptor (GPCR) allosteric modulation. J. Biol. Chem. 287: 650–659.
- Valant, C., Gregory, K.J., Hall, N.E., Scammells, P.J., Lew, M.J., Sexton, P.M. and A. Christopoulos (2008) A novel mechanism of G protein-coupled receptor functional selectivity: muscarinic partial agonist McN-A-343 as a bitopic orthosteric/allosteric ligand, J. Biol. Chem, 283: 29312–29321.
- Motulsky, H. and Christopoulos, A. Fitting Models to Biological Data Using Linear and Nonlinear Regression: A practical guide to curve fitting. Oxford University Press. 2004. ISBN 0-19-517179-9
- Christopoulos, A. and T. Kenakin (2002) G protein-coupled receptor allosterism and complexing, Pharmacol. Rev. 54: 323–374.
- Christopoulos, A. (2002) Allosteric binding sites on cell-surface receptors: Novel targets for drug discovery. Nature Rev. Drug Discovery 1: 198–210.
