= John Rickard =

John Rickard may refer to:

- John Rickard (civil servant), British civil servant and economic advisor
- John Rickard (economist), Australian economist
- John Rickard (historian), Australian historian
- John T. Rickard, mayor of Santa Barbara, California
