= Pudłowski =

Pudłowski c.o.a.

Pudłowski (feminine: Pudłowska) is a Polish noble family name of Pudłowski coat of arms. It may refer to:

- Gilles Pudlowski (born 1950), French food critic
- Zenon J. Pudlowski (born 1943), Polish engineer and educator
- Mary Lucy Denise Pudlowski, birth name of Marilu Henner, American actress and author
