= August Bausch =

German painter

August Bausch (2 March 1818 – 28 February 1909) was a German genre, portrait and history painter of the Düsseldorf school of painting.

== Life ==
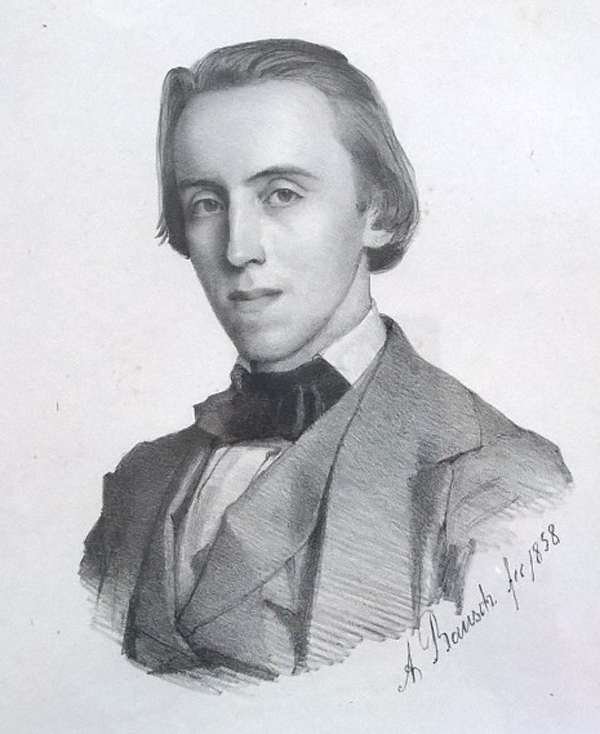
Hermann Deiters, 1858

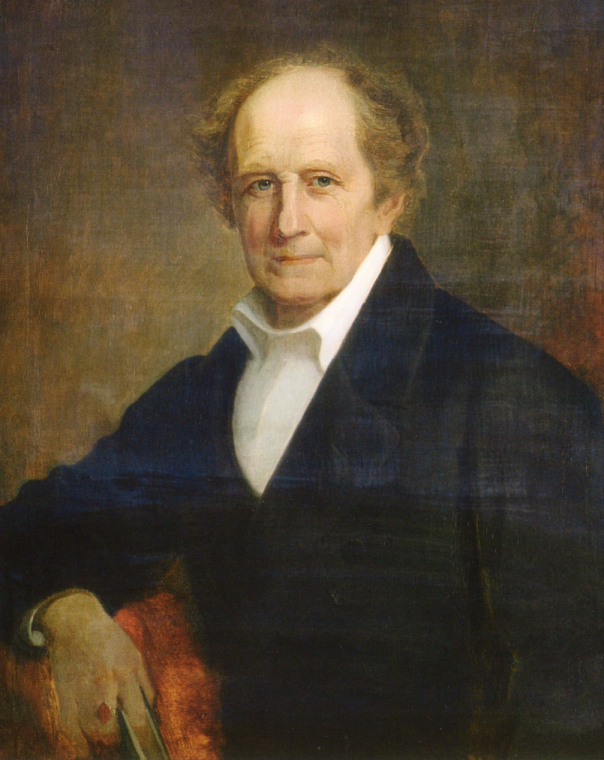
Friedrich Wilhelm August Argelander, c. 1868

Bausch came from Bonn to the Kunstakademie Düsseldorf. From 1835 to 1839, Karl Ferdinand Sohn was his teacher there. After his studies, he worked in Düsseldorf and Bonn. In 1839, he exhibited the picture Abraham and Isaac's sacrifice in Frankfurt. As a history painter, he attracted the attention of the art professor Rudolf Wiegmann with his paintings Gretchen and Martha (after Goethe's Faust) (1841) and Tempelritter auf der Morgenwache (1843). However, Bausch made a name for himself as a portrait painter and portrait draughtsman in his home town of Bonn, where he especially created portraits of students, mainly that of his nephew Hermann Deiters. Also well-known is his portrait of the astronomer Friedrich Wilhelm August Argelander from Bonn, painted around 1868.

== Work ==
- Der Heilige Servatius im Bischofsornat, 1840
- Orientalische Hafenstadt mit Dschunke und chinesischen Händlerbooten, Öl auf Platte, 32 × 46 cm
