= Hermann Deiters =

German musicologist and philologist

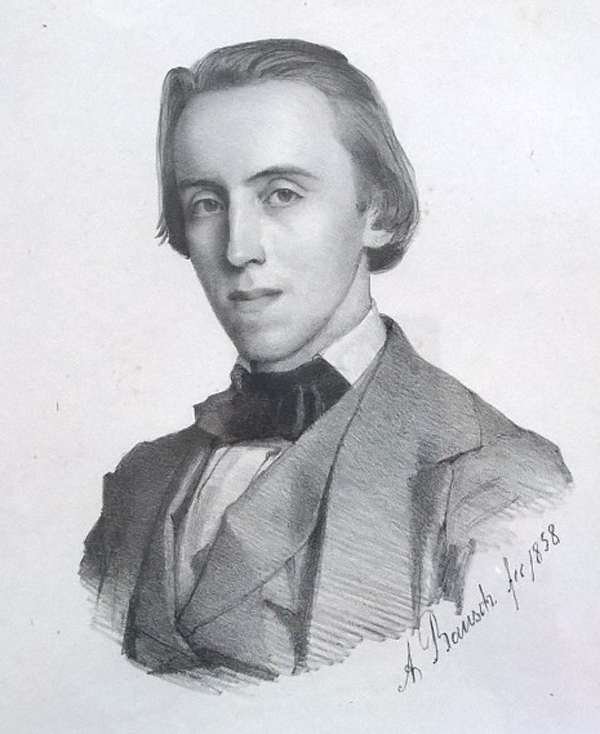
- Hermann Deiters, drawing by his uncle, August Bausch, 1858
- Born: 27 June 1833; Bonn
- Died: 11 May 1907 (aged 73); Koblenz
- Education: University of Bonn
- Occupations: Writer about music; Educator

Hermann Deiters (27 June 1833 – 11 May 1907) was a German writer about music, and educator. He is known for his writings about Ludwig van Beethoven, publishing the composer's first major biography as a translation of Alexander Wheelock Thayer's work.

== Life and career ==
Deiters was born in Bonn on 27 June 1833. He was the son of the Bonn lawyer and politician Peter Franz Ignaz Deiters. His father, and all his siblings, belonged to the Catholic Church, while his mother Emilie née Bausch was Protestant.

From 1842 onwards, Deiters and his younger brother Otto attended the Beethoven-Gymnasium Bonn, which was then headed by Ludwig Schopen. After his Abitur (25 July 1850), he first studied classical philology and history at the Rheinische Friedrich-Wilhelms-Universität Bonn. After one semester, he switched to law because of his father's wish and completed his studies with a doctorate in law in 1854. During his studies, he became a member of the Bonner Burschenschaft Frankonia in 1853. His first position (in winter 1854/55 as an auscultator at the Berlin city court) did not satisfy him, so he returned to Bonn and resumed his studies of philology. He attended lectures by Christian August Brandis, Heinrich Brunn, Franz Ritter, and Ludwig Schopen, but he was most influenced by the directors of the philological seminar, Friedrich Gottlieb Welcker, Friedrich Ritschl, and Otto Jahn, of which Deiters was a member for three semesters. In accordance with his inclination and versatile talents, he joined Jahn in particular, who represented broad areas of antiquity studies and was also known as a musician and musicologist. Deiters received his doctorate on 28 July 1858 with a dissertation on Hesiod's Aspis. On 6 November 1858, he passed the habilitation for secondary school teachers and began his probationary year at the Gymnasium in Bonn, where he subsequently taught as an assistant teacher, and from 1 July 1862 as a full-time teacher.

On 1 January 1869, he changed to the Gymnasium in Düren as senior teacher. In 1874, he moved to West Prussia as headmaster of the Gymnasium Konitz. On 1 January 1877, he transferred to the Mariengymnasium in Posen. As headmaster, Deiters endeavoured to provide his school with material and personnel. He laid down technical, methodological-didactic, and pedagogical principles, as he was used to them from Bonn, and set up student libraries and collections of teaching materials. Finally, he returned to Bonn, where he was appointed head of the Königliches Gymnasium on 1 October 1883. He became Provinzialschulrat in Koblenz in 1885, responsible for teacher training and school equipment in the Rhine Province. Deiters carried out his duties with great commitment and considerable success, and received several awards: in 1891 he was appointed Geheimrat, and later he received the Order of the Crown and the Order of the Red Eagle, 2nd Class. For health reasons, Deiters retired on 1 October 1903, and he died in Koblenz on 11 May 1907 at the age of 73.

Deiters was married first to Agnes Burkart, who died in 1884, and from 1886 to Sibylla Heimsoeth, the daughter of the philologist and musicologist Friedrich Heimsoeth. The two marriages produced seven children.

== Academic work ==
In addition to his work in the Prussian teaching profession, Deiters was engaged in scientific work. His early works dealt with topics of Greek mythology, especially the cult of Muses. However, the main focus of his research became the music itself, which Deiters had been involved with since his childhood. He abandoned his plan to become a composer or pianist before he began his studies, but the history, development and practice of music occupied him throughout his life. At the beginning of his career, Deiters wrote music reviews and reports for various newspapers and magazines, including the Allgemeine musikalische Zeitung. He venerated Mozart, Beethoven, and Schumann, and of contemporary composers especially Johannes Brahms, who was his close friend from the 1860s. He rigorously rejected Wagner and his massive innovations in musical practice.

After the death of his teacher Otto Jahn, he revised his biography of Mozart, which was published in third and fourth editions in 1889 and 1905 respectively. He also corresponded with the American researcher Alexander Wheelock Thayer, who was working on a major Beethoven biography. Deiters translated the work into German and accompanied the publication of the first three volumes (1866, 1872, 1879). The German edition of this biography was particularly important because the English original had not yet been published. After Thayer's death (1897), his heirs commissioned Deiters to publish the rest of the work.

== Publications ==
The publications by Deiters include:

- De mancipationis indole et ambitu. 1854 (dissertation in law)
- De Hesiodia scuti Herculis descriptione. 1858 (philological dissertation)
- De Hesiodi theogoniae prooemio. 1863 (program of the Königliches Gymnasium zu Bonn)
- Das philologische Studium in Bonn. Von einem rheinischen Schulmanne. Cologne 1865
- Über die Verehrung der Musen bei den Griechen. Bonn 1868
- De Aristidis Quintiliani doctrinae harmonicae fontibus. Particula prima. Düren 1870 (programme of the Gymnasium in Düren)
- Die Handschriften und alten Drucke der hiesigen Gymnasialbibliothek. Konitz 1875 (programme of the Gymnasium in Konitz)
- Über das Verhältnis des Martianus Capella zu Aristides Quintilianus. Posen 1881 (programme of the Gymnasium in Posen)
- Johannes Brahms, in Sammlung Musikalischer Vorträge (XXIII-XXIV). Breitkopf & Härtel, Leipzig, 1880
- Die Briefe Beethoven’s an Bettina von Arnim. Leipzig 1882
- Johannes Brahms, a Biographical Sketch (first edited in English). Ed. by J.A. Füller-Maitland (T.F. Unwin, London 1888).

=== Publisher ===
- A. W. Thayer: Ludwig van Beethoven’s Leben. Vol. 1, second edition, Leipzig 1901. Vol. 4, Leipzig 1907. Vol. 5, Leipzig 1908
- Otto Jahn: Mozart. Two volumes, third edition, 1889; fourth edition, 1905
