= Monash University, Parkville campus =

Pharmacy faculty of Monash University

Coordinates: 37°47′02″S 144°57′31″E

Monash University Faculty of Pharmacy and Pharmaceutical Sciences
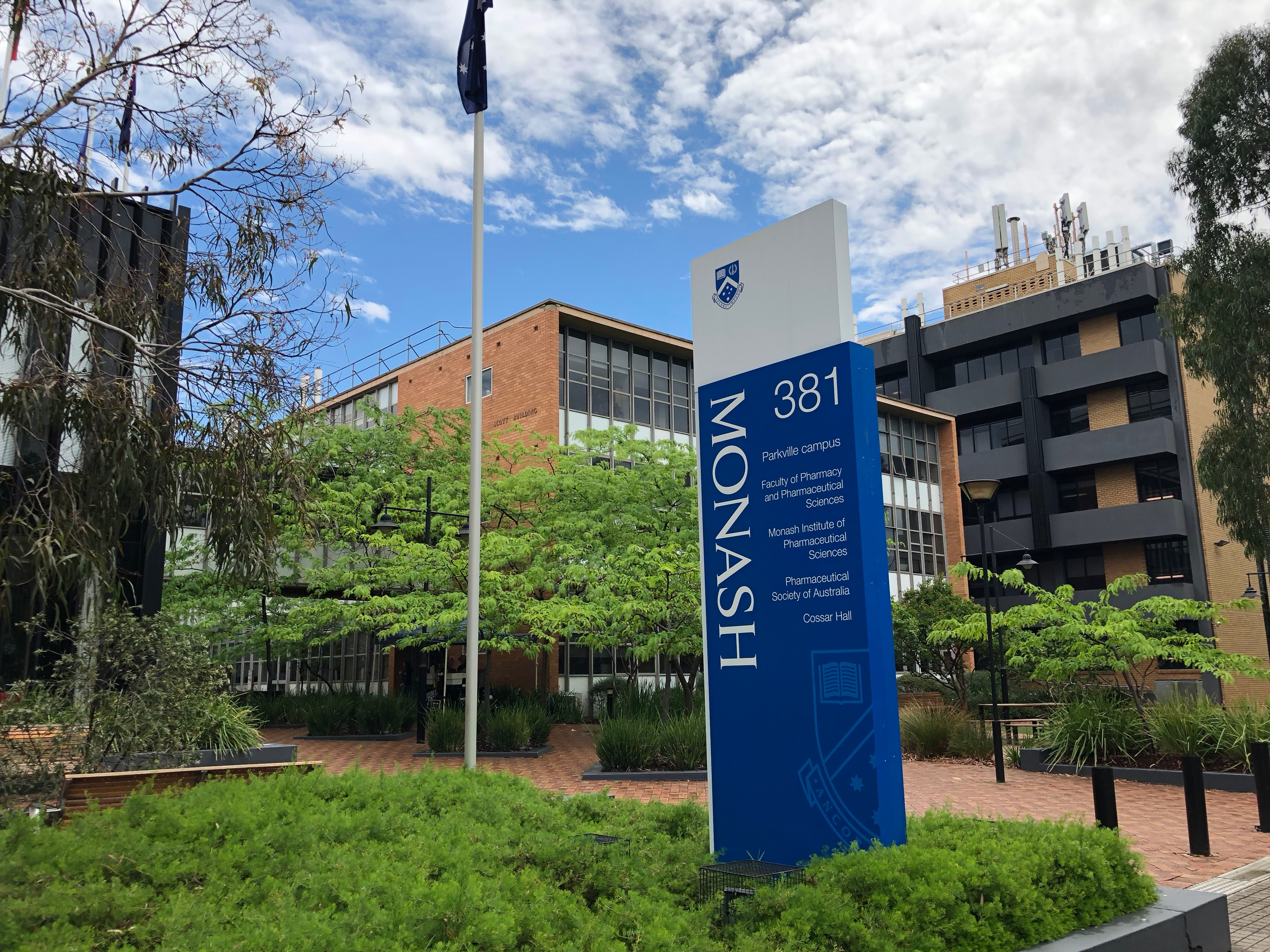
- Type: Public
- Established: 1881 (as Victorian College of Pharmacy)
- Parent institution: Monash University (since 1992)
- Dean: Professor Arthur Christopoulos
- Administrative staff: 400
- Students: 3,200
- Location: Parkville, Victoria, Australia
- Campus: Urban
- Website: www.pharm.monash.edu.au

Monash University, Parkville campus is a campus of Monash University, located in Parkville, Victoria, Australia. It is home to the Faculty of Pharmacy and Pharmaceutical Sciences. Founded in 1881, and previously known as the Victorian College of Pharmacy, the faculty is the oldest school of pharmacy in Australia. A major centre of research and teaching, it is internationally regarded for its research in drug target biology and discovery, medicinal chemistry, drug development, formulation science, and medicine use and safety, including the discovery and development of the world's first successful anti-influenza drug, Relenza. According to QS World University Rankings, it is the number one school of pharmacy and pharmacology in Australia and number two worldwide.

The campus is made up of 5 buildings. It is situated on Royal Parade in the suburb of Parkville, around 2 km north of the Melbourne CBD. Royal Parade is home to a number of other research institutions, including the University of Melbourne, the CSIRO's Division of Health Sciences and the Royal Melbourne Hospital. The pharmaceutical company CSL Limited is also based in Parkville.

The campus offers courses in pharmacy and pharmaceutical science. Students can also take a simultaneous degree in engineering at Monash University's Clayton campus. The campus also offers postgraduate degrees by coursework or research, from graduate diploma through to PhD level.

The campus currently has roughly 3200 students and around 400 staff. Since 2009, its pharmacy course has also been offered at the university's Malaysia campus, in partnership with the School of Medicine and Health Sciences based there.

The current dean of the college is Professor Arthur Christopoulos.

== History ==
Monash University Faculty of Pharmacy and Pharmaceutical Sciences, previously known as the Victorian College of Pharmacy, is one of the oldest educational institutions in Australia. It was founded in 1881 as the School of the Pharmaceutical Society of Victoria (now Pharmaceutical Society of Australia Victoria branch). After being housed in various places in Melbourne, it moved to its present location in 1960. The move to Parkville was largely funded by the massive private donation of £25,000 by David Cossar. At the time, this was the largest single donation to a pharmacy school in Australian history. In its early years, the college was essentially run as a private institution, with the majority of its funding coming from tuition fees and the donations of benefactors. In 1967, the college reached an agreement with the federal and state governments for it to receive government financial assistance. In 1974, fees for tertiary education in Australia were abolished, meaning that funding for the college began to be sourced primarily from the federal government.

After the introduction of the unified national system of higher education in 1988, known as the Dawkins reforms, it was clear that the college had to combine with a university. Negotiations were started with University of Melbourne, which was seen as the obvious partner, given their close proximity. However, these negotiations collapsed in 1990. The college then began discussions with Monash University, which were successful. The transfer was finalised on 1 July 1992 by the Monash University (Pharmacy College) Act 1992 (No. 10 of 1992) and the college became the Faculty of Pharmacy of[Monash University. It celebrated its 125th anniversary in 2006. In August 2008, the Victorian College of Pharmacy underwent a name change to reflect its position within Monash, to the Faculty of Pharmacy and Pharmaceutical Sciences.

== Deans and directors ==
- John Kruse (1882–1885)
- Cuthbert Blackett (1886) (acting)
- Alfred H. Jackson (1886–1889)
- Sidney Plowman (1890–1891)
- A.T.S. 'Stan' Sissons (1920–1962)
- Nigel Manning (1963–1978)
- Geoffrey Vaughan (1979–1987)
- Robert Burnet (1987) (acting)
- Colin Raper (1987) (acting)
- Tom R. Watson (1988–1991)
- Colin Chapman (1991–2006)
- Bill Charman (2007–2019)
- Arthur Christopoulos (since 2019)

== Structure ==
In teaching, the campus now incorporates:

- Department of Medicinal Chemistry
- Department of Pharmaceutical Biology and Pharmacology
- Department of Pharmaceutics
- Department of Pharmacy Practice

The Monash Institute of Pharmaceutical Sciences (MIPS) was set up in 2008 to focus on the research aspects within the faculty. The research activities are based on four key discipline-based themes, including:

- Medicinal Chemistry and Drug Action
- Centre for Drug Candidate Optimisation
- Drug Delivery, Disposition and Dynamics
- Drug Discovery Biology
- Centre for Medicine Use and Safety

== Notable alumni ==
The campus's alumni includes graduates who have become well known in fields outside of science, including many politicians and senior public servants, and national leaders such as Weary Dunlop.

== Books ==
- Janette Bomford, Victorian College of Pharmacy: 125 years of history, 1881-2006
- H.V. Feehan, Birth of the Victorian College of Pharmacy
- Louise Gray and Karen Stephens, Victorian College of Pharmacy: 125 stories for 125 years, 1881-2006
- Geoffrey Hutton, The Victorian College of Pharmacy: an observer's view
- Victorian College of Pharmacy, The Search for a partner : a history of the amalgamation of the Victorian College of Pharmacy and Monash University
