= Les William =

Australian maker of scientific instruments

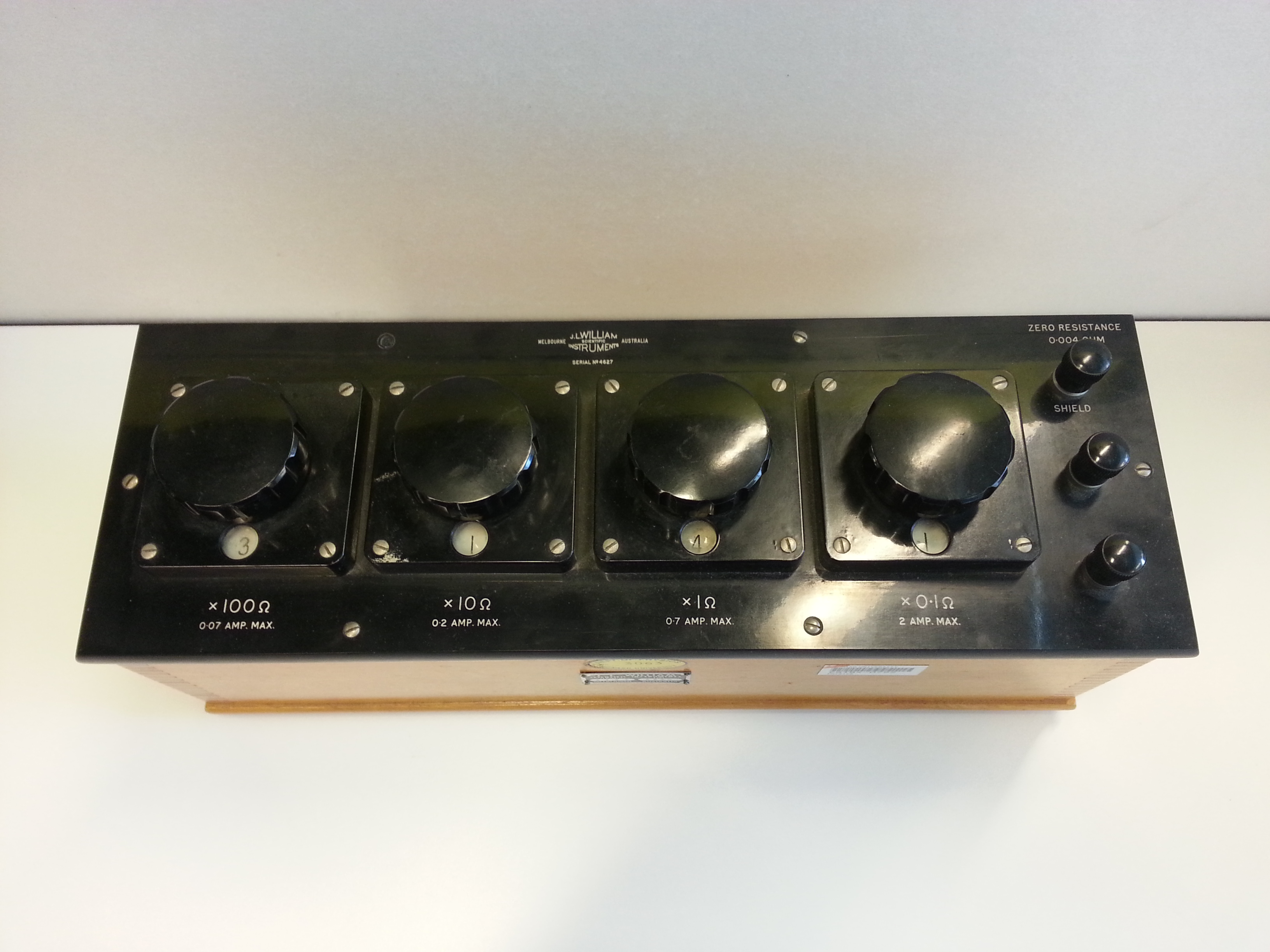
Standard Resistor created by J. L. William Scientific Instruments

J. L. (Les) William (18 January 1915 – 4 June 1994) was an Australian builder of scientific instruments. Born in Melbourne, Australia he was known for his beautiful and precision craftsmanship and was known as one of the best scientific instrument makers in Australia. His equipment can be found in Australian laboratories that existed from the 1930s through to the 1980s. He founded a company situated in the Melbourne suburb of Hughesdale called J.L. William Scientific Instruments. William attended Caulfield Technical School and worked at his brother's firm during the Second World War. Soon after he set up his own instrumentation company. He never married and in his later years suffered from motor neurone disease.

Les William liked to recall Lord Kelvin's dictum that one did not truly understand a scientific quantity until one could measure it and provide an accurate numerical value. William's career was closely linked to that of his older brother Austin (1913 - 1985). During the Second World War the two brothers worked together producing electrical meters. After the war, Austin continued on in the manufacture of electrical meters while Les established his own company producing high accuracy standard resistors. He died in Melbourne on 4 June 1994. In his will, William made a substantial bequest to Monash University Department of Physics.

A portrait of J. L. (Les) William was commissioned by Monash University's School of Physics. The portrait was painted by the Adelaide artist Ms Avril Thomas. The J. L. William Bequest to the School of Physics specifically mentions "quantum measurements", and the portrait will be displayed in the Monash University's New Horizons Centre; a multi-disciplinary building which encompasses energy research, low-dimensional and nano-material physics research, atom optics, laser trapping and cooling, and Bose-Einstein condensates.

== J L William Scholarships ==
As a result of William's bequest Monash University's School of Physics now offers students scholarships on his behalf.

== Awards ==
In 1970, William was awarded an honorary Master of Science by Monash University.
