= Peter Lee (engineer) =

Professor Peter Leslie Lee (born 1954) is an Australian engineer, academic, and higher education administrator, and a recognized authority within the field of process control. He served as vice-chancellor of Southern Cross University.

== Education ==
Lee was educated in Melbourne, Australia, and holds a BEng (Chem) Degree from RMIT and was awarded a PhD from Monash University.

== Professional career ==
Lee has wide experience in higher education administration in Australia, including service with Curtin University of Technology, Monash University, the University of South Australia and the University of Queensland. Lee served as Vice-Chancellor of Southern Cross University in northern New South Wales from 2009 to 2016, and has also served as Chair of the Australian Regional Universities Network.

== Honours and awards ==
Lee was awarded the Centenary Medal in 2001; the Institute of Engineers Australia Excellence Award in 1998; and the Sheddon Pacific Medal for Excellence in 1993.

== Publications ==
- Bao, J.and Lee, P.L. 2007. Process Control: The Passive Systems Approach. London and New York: Springer.
- Lee, P. L., Newell, R.B. and Cameron, I.T. 1998. Process Control and Management. London: Blackie Academic and Professional.
- Lee, P.L. 1993. Nonlinear Process Control. London and New York: Springer.
- Newell, R.B. and Lee, P.L. 1989. Applied Process Control: A Case Study. New York and Sydney: Prentice-Hall.

Online articles: http://theconversation.com/profiles/peter-lee-124620

Academic offices
Preceded by Paul Clark	Succeeded by Adam Shoemaker
Vice-Chancellor of Southern Cross University; 2009 – 2016
