= Neil Rees (legal scholar) =

Australian jurist and legal academic

Professor Neil Rees is an Australian jurist and legal academic. He is a former Chairperson of the Victorian Law Reform Commission (VLRC), Victoria's chief law reform organisation.

Rees obtained a Bachelor of Laws and a Bachelor of Jurisprudence from Monash University where, as an undergraduate, he helped to found the Monash Springvale Community Legal Centre - the first university-based, and now the oldest continually running community legal centre in Australia.

After graduating, Rees was admitted as a Barrister and Solicitor in Victoria. He then worked in legal practice, including with the Aboriginal Legal Aid Service. Rees then moved into the public service to become Assistant Director of Policy and Research for the Victorian Attorney-General. Following this, Rees moved into academia, taking up a position at the University of New South Wales as Director of Legal Education. In 1991, Professor Rees was appointed foundation Dean at the University of Newcastle Law School. His research focus as an academic was in equal opportunity law, employment law and administrative law. His prior appointments include President of the Mental Health Review Board and Chairman of the Psychosurgery Review Board.

On 20 February 2007, Victorian Attorney-General Rob Hulls announced that Rees would replace Marcia Neave as the Chairperson of the Victorian Law Reform Commission, a position Rees as held since June 2007. Rees handed down one of the Commission's most discussed reports in recent years in May 2008, advising the Victorian Government on the decriminalisation of abortion.
