= David McCarthy (academic) =

Australian engineer and hydrologist

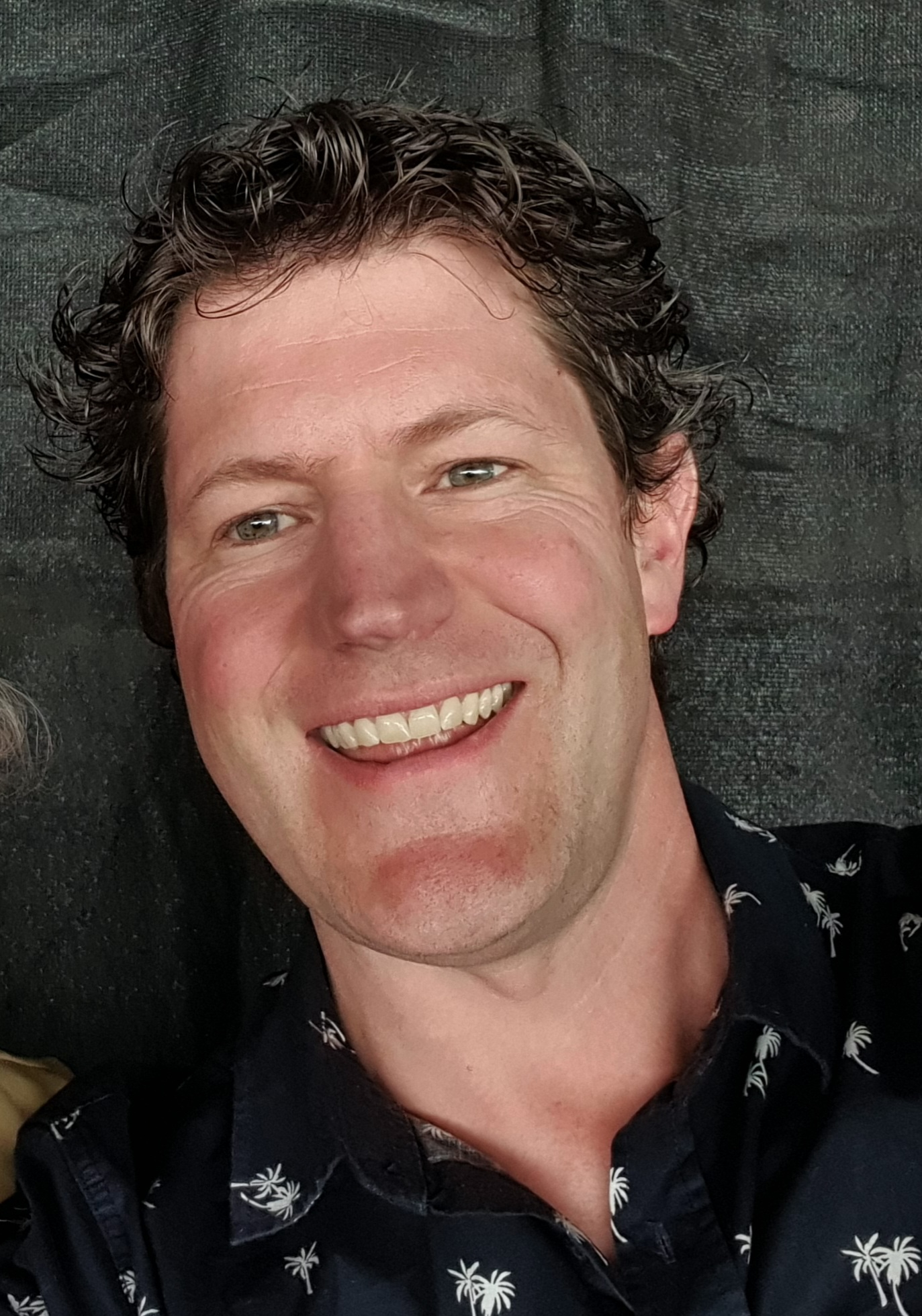
- Occupations: Civil engineer, urban hydrologist, and academic
- Awards: Stormwater Industry Association Award, Storm Water Industry Association; Young Tall Poppy Science Award, Australian Institute of Policy and Science (AIPS); Trevithick Prize, Institution of Civil Engineers (ICE)

Academic background
- Education: BSc in Physics and Mathematics, BEng (Hons) in Civil Engineering, and PhD in Civil and Environmental Engineering
- Alma mater: Monash University
- Thesis: Modelling microorganisms in urban stormwater (2009)

David McCarthy is an Australian civil engineer and urban hydrologist. He is Canada Excellence Research Chair in Waterborne Pathogens: Surveillance, Prediction, and Mitigation at the University of Guelph.

McCarthy has conducted research in the field of integrated water management, urban hydrology, stormwater harvesting and reuse, and green water technologies.

McCarthy is an executive editor of Water Research.

== Education and career ==
McCarthy earned a BSc in Mathematics and Physics in 2004, and a Bachelor of Engineering in Civil Engineering in 2005 from Monash University. He undertook postgraduate research in the Civil Engineering Department there from 2005 and completed his PhD in 2009.

McCarthy joined University of Guelph, where he was appointed Canada Excellence Research Chair in 2023.

== Research ==
McCarthy has conducted research in the fields of urban hydrology, stormwater management, sensor networks, and wastewater treatment. He developed a model for predicting microorganism concentrations in urban stormwater.

=== Integrated water management ===
While investigating urban drainage quality and quantity modeling, McCarthy assessed and characterized the techniques that are used in the uncertainty assessment of the parameters of water models. Later, he presented a review of integrated urban water modeling, formulated a new typology for the classification of integrated models, and also addressed the fundamental model features. He also put forth the process-based MPiRe model (Micro-Pollutants In RaingardEns - quality model) with a team of researchers in order to remove a variety of micro-pollutants from stormwater using biofilters.

=== Wastewater surveillance ===
Focusing the research on wastewater-based surveillance during the COVID-19 pandemic, McCarthy developed a sampler unit for the detection of SARS-CoV-2, and other wastewater-based epidemiology (WBE). He collaborated with UoG researchers Larry Goodridge, Ed McBean, Heather Murphy and March Habash, who used his device to monitor wastewater at UoG residences and at the Guelph Wastewater Facility (GWF).

=== Low-cost sensors ===
With a team of researchers, he proposed a low-power sensor for discharge detection that can be deployed in the urban drainage network for high-resolution data monitoring against high-end loggers and sensors. They developed new sensors, loggers, and AI anomaly detection algorithms and applied them to a smart sensor array that could detect illicit connections that introduced pathogens into Australian drinking water supplies and recreational waterways. Using these sensor networks, his research team detected incursions of sewage into Australian waterways.

== Awards and honors ==
- 2009 – Stormwater Industry Association Award, Storm Water Industry Association
- 2009-2010 – Winston Churchill Fellowship, International Churchill Society
- 2012 – FASIC Fellowship, Australian Academy of Science
- 2014 – Young Tall Poppy Science Award, Australian Institute of Policy and Science (AIPS)
- 2014 – Victoria Fellow, Victoria State Government
- 2014 –Trevithick Prize, Institution of Civil Engineers (ICE)

=== Selected articles ===
- Schang, C.; Crosbie, N. D.; Nolan, M.; Poon, R.; Wang, M.; Jex, A.; McCarthy, D. T. (2021). "Passive sampling of SARS-CoV-2 for wastewater surveillance" (PDF). Environmental Science & Technology. 55 (15): 10432–10441. Bibcode:2021EnST...5510432S. doi:10.1021/acs.est.1c01530. PMID 34264643.
- Catsamas, S.; Shi, B.; Deletic, B.; Wang, M.; McCarthy, D. T. (2022). "A Low-Cost, Low-Power Water Velocity Sensor Utilizing Acoustic Doppler Measurement". Sensors. 22 (19): 7451. Bibcode:2022Senso..22.7451C. doi:10.3390/s22197451. PMC 9572237. PMID 36236550.
- Murni, I. K.; Oktaria, V.; Handley, A.; McCarthy, D. T.; Donato, C. M.; Nuryastuti, T.; Bines, J. E. (2022). "The feasibility of SARS-CoV-2 surveillance using wastewater and environmental sampling in Indonesia". PLOS ONE. 17 (10) e0274793. Bibcode:2022PLoSO..1774793M. doi:10.1371/journal.pone.0274793. PMC 9565423. PMID 36240187.
- Lim, T. J.; Sargent, R.; Henry, R.; Fletcher, T. D.; Coleman, R. A.; McCarthy, D. T.; Lintern, A. (2022). "Riparian buffers: Disrupting the transport of E. coli from rural catchments to streams". Water Research. 222 118897. Bibcode:2022WatRe.22218897L. doi:10.1016/j.watres.2022.118897. PMID 35932702.
- Galbraith, P.; Henry, R.; McCarthy, D. T. (2022). "Plants against pathogens: Effect of significant antimicrobial-producing plants on faecal microbe inactivation throughout the soil profile of stormwater biofilters". Water Research. 221 118707. Bibcode:2022WatRe.22118707G. doi:10.1016/j.watres.2022.118707. PMID 35717708.
