= Lara Owen =

British academic and author

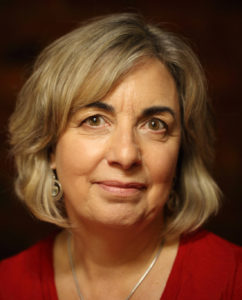

Lara Owen is a British author and academic specialising in the politics, organization and culture of menstruation. She is known for her early writing on destigmatising menstruation; her later work researching innovations in menstrual organization; and her teaching program, Contemporary Menstrual Studies. She is the author of Her Blood Is Gold (1993) and Reorganizing Menstruation: Menstrual Innovations and the Redistribution of Boundaries, Capitals, and Labour (2024). She has been called "the mother of menstrual cycle awareness".

== Books ==
- Her Blood is Gold: Awakening to the Wisdom of Menstruation, Archive Publishing. ISBN 978-1906289553
- Growing Your Inner Light: A Guide to Independent Spiritual Practice, Beyond Words/Simon & Schuster (2009) in the US; Piatkus/Little Brown (2011) in the UK. ISBN 978-0749954086
- Reorganizing Menstruation: Menstrual Innovations and the Redistribution of Boundaries, Capitals, and Labour, Oxford University Press (2024). ISBN 978-0192870582
