= Terry Budge =

Australian businessman

- Education: Economics
- Alma mater: Murdoch University

Terry Budge is an Australian banking executive and held the position of Chancellor at Murdoch University from 2006 to 2013.

== History ==
After attaining a degree in Economics at Monash University, Terry Budge started his career as a banker with over 35 years in the Australian banking sector and business. He was the managing director of Bankwest from 1997 to 2004 and worked with the National Australia Bank for 25 years in various senior executive positions.

Budge is the Chairman of Leadership WA, Chancellor of Murdoch University, directorship of Westoz Investment Company and Days of Change, and is a director of AON Risk Services Australia Board of Advice.

Budge's former positions included Chairman of LandCorp, National Director and Western Australian State President of the Australian Institute of Company Directors, the State President of the Committee for Economic Development of Australia and director of the Federal Government's Financial Sector Advisory Council.

He was appointed chancellor of Murdoch University in late 2006.

== See also ==
- List of Australian university leaders
