= Angelina Lauro =

Angelina Lauro is the name of a number of ships:

- SS Angelina Lauro, in service with Achille Lauro Line from 1932–40
- MS Angelina Lauro, in service with Lauro Lines from 1964 until 1979
- MS Angelina Lauro (1989), a cruise ship in service with StarLauro 1989–1991
