= Mary Tonkin =

Australian artist (born c. 1973)

- Born: 1973 (age 52–53); Melbourne, Australia
- Occupation: Artist

Academic background
- Education: Monash University

Academic work
- Discipline: Art
- Institutions: Monash University

Mary Tonkin is an Australian artist, who in 2002 won the Dobell Prize, the highest prize for drawing in Australia. She was awarded her prize for her work Rocky Outcrop, Werribee Gorge 2000.

Tonkin was born in Melbourne, Australia in 1973. In 1992, she was accepted to study at the Faculty of Art and Design at Monash University. She went on to obtain a Bachelor of Arts (Fine Arts) with honours and a Masters in Fine Arts.

From 1996 to 2004, she was a lecturer at Monash University.

Major recent exhibitions of Tonkin's works include Near the top dam (2007), a retrospective exhibition Home 2000-2010 (2011–2) at the Burrinja Gallery in Upwey, Victoria, and at the Sydney Contemporary in 2022, which included the major, 21-panel work Ramble, Kalorama (2017–19), which was featured in Art Almanac in 2019.

== List of solo exhibitions ==
- Both sides now, Australian Galleries, Melbourne, 2024
- Sydney Contemporary, Carriageworks, Sydney, 2022
- Ramble, Whitehorse Artspace, Melbourne, 2020
- Ramble, Australian Galleries, Melbourne, 2019
- Between the dams, Australian Galleries, Sydney, 2017
- Two spots, Australian Galleries, Melbourne, 2015
- A short walk, Australian Galleries, Melbourne, 2013
- Black paintings, La Trobe Regional Art Gallery, Mrowell, 2012
- Home 2000–2010, Burrinja Gallery, Upwey, 2011

== Collections ==
- Art Gallery of New South Wales, Sydney
- National Gallery of Victoria, Melbourne
- Mornington Peninsula Regional Gallery, Mornington
- Shepparton Art Museum, Shepparton
- Kedumba Collection of Contemporary Australian Drawing, Wentworth Falls
- City of Whitehorse, Melbourne
- ANZ Bank, Melbourne
- Monash University, Melbourne
- Australian Catholic University, Melbourne
- Deakin University, Melbourne
- UNSW Art Collections, Sydney

== Awards ==
- Holding Redlich People's Choice Award Salon des Refuses, S. H. Ervin Gallery, Sydney, 2022
- Kedumba Prize for Drawing, Wentworth Falls, 2010
- Dobell Drawing Prize, Art Gallery of New South Wales, Sydney, 2002
