= Modjtaba Sadria =

Iranian philosopher (born 1949)

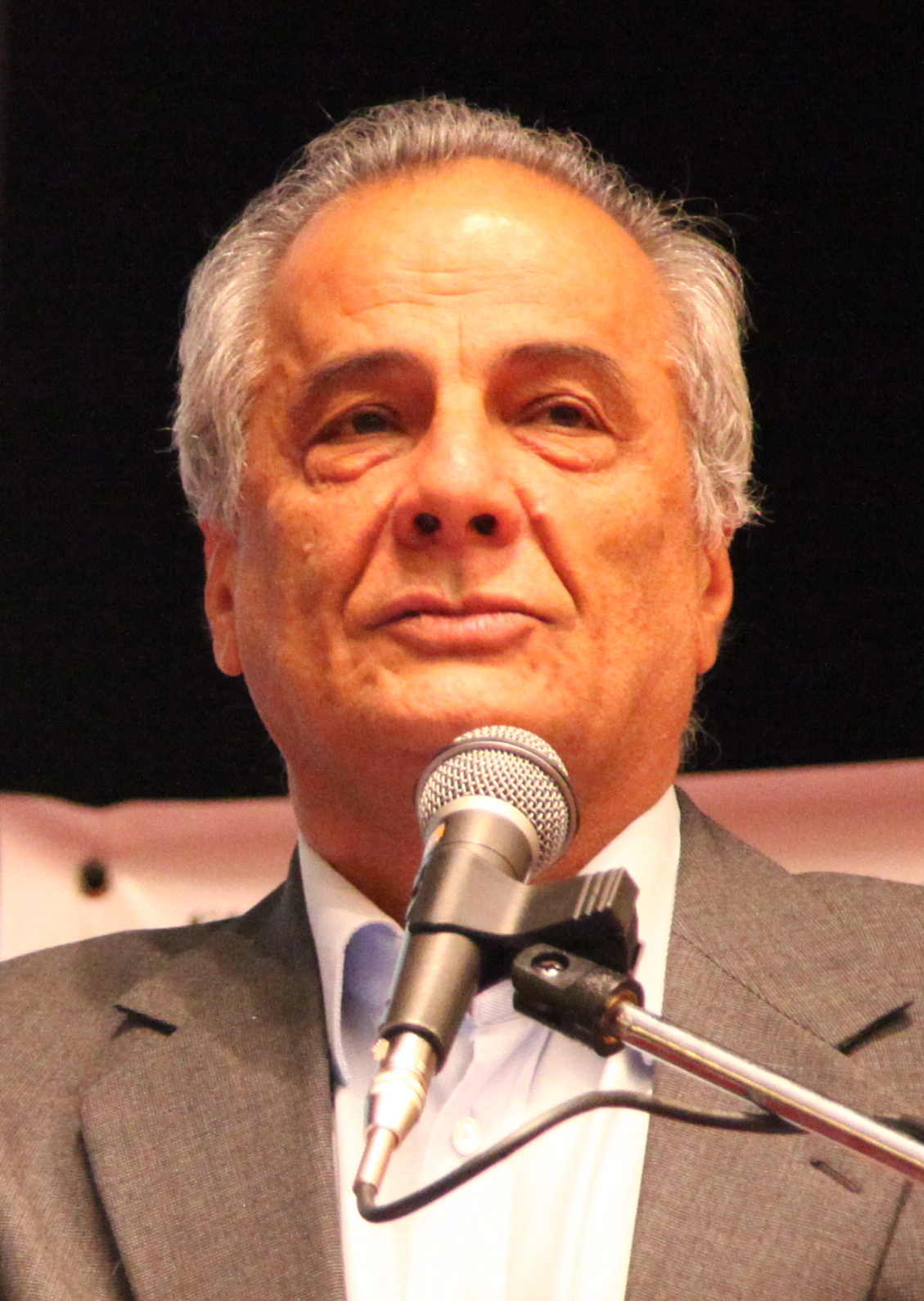
- Modjtaba Sadria
- Born: March 1949 (age 77); Tehran, Iran

Education
- Education: Université du Québec

Philosophical work
- Era: Contemporary philosophy
- Main interests: Social philosophy, Cultural studies, International relations
- Notable ideas: "Knowledge construction", "cities in Muslim societies", "plurality of Modernity", "production and reproduction of poverty"

Modjtaba Sadria (Persian: مجتبی صدریا; born March 1949) is an Iranian-born philosopher, socio-cultural theorist and international social policy development specialist. He has been the head of "Think Tank for Knowledge Excellence" since 2009, in Tehran, Iran. He has been scientific consultant in Denmark Nomad Academy, since summer 2011.

== Academic career ==
Sadria was educated in Germany for International Law, France for Philosophy, History, and Sociology, and Canada for International relations, and Cultural Studies. He has worked for several universities in various countries as a scholar such as the Institute for the Study of Muslim Civilisations, Aga Khan University, Institute of Policy and Cultural Studies, Chuo University, Institute of Oriental Culture, University of Tokyo, and Université de Montréal. Sadria has been Professor of Monash University Faculty of Medicine, Nursing and Health Sciences in Melbourne, Australia since September 2009.

== Social activities ==
Sadria organises several intellectual networks around the globe. Notably, he has been the Master Jury in 2004 and Steering Committee in 2007 and 2010 for Aga Khan Award for Architecture, and Senior Associate of Global Reconciliation Network and Director of the Australian Centre for West and Central Asian Studies. He was also an important intellectual for UN Dialogue Among Civilizations, and a member of Kyoto International Culture Forum. As some other primal projects, Sadria is a founder of Study Group on Human Security, CITIES: Big Small Stories of Changes (In Turkish), and Small and large Stories of Change (In German). Furthermore, his vigorous activities can be seen in various other socio-intellectual movements such as Changing Teheran, and Global Cities Research Institute.

== Bibliography ==
=== Books and edited collections ===
| Year | Title |
|---|---|
| 1994 | "Realism: Trap of International Relations (in Japanese) |
| 2002 | People Who Live on the Edge of the World |
| 2003 | Global Civil Society and Ethics: Finding Common Ground |
| 2003 | Prayer for Lost Objects: A Non-Weberian Approach to the Birth of Modern Society (in Persian) |
| 2014 | Sustainability, Life and Culture (in Persian) |
| 2012 | A Modern critic to Modernity (in Persian) |
| 2011 | Japan: Cooperation and Competition, Knowledge Flow Among Small Enterprises (in Persian) (Tehran: Rozane Kar-Industrial Managers Association) |
| 2011 | Homogenization of Representations (London: IB Tauris) |
| 2009 | Multiple Modernities in Muslim Societies, Aga Khan Award for Architecture (London: IB Tauris) |
| 2006 | Dialogical Views on Today's World, (in Persian) (Tehran: Digar Publishing) |
| 2004 | A Prayer for Lost Objects: A Non-Weberian Approach to the Birth of Modern Society (in Persian) (Tehran: Farhangi Publications) |
| 2001 | Conflict in Japanese Society and International Relations (in Persian) (Tehran: IPIS Publication) |
| 1996 | Realism: Trap of International Relations [Kenshou Genjitsushugi Kokusaikankei no Otoshiana (in Japanese)] (Tokyo: Chuo University Press) |
| 1989 | Ainsi l’Arabie est Devenue Saoudite (Paris: l’Harmatten, 1989) |
| 1985 | Les Autres Marxismes Reels (Paris: Christian Bourgeois, 1985) |
