= George Hampel (judge) =

Australian barrister and judge (1933–2024)

George Hampel AM KC

Justice of the Supreme Court of Victoria
- In office 1983–2000

Personal details
- Born: October 4, 1933 Poland
- Died: October 8, 2024 (aged 91)
- Spouse: Felicity Hampel
- Children: 2
- Education: Melbourne High School
- Alma mater: University of Melbourne
- Profession: Barrister

George Hampel AM KC (4 October 1933 – 8 October 2024) was an Australian barrister and judge. He was a Justice of the Supreme Court of Victoria from 1983 to 2000, having previously practised as a barrister from 1958.

== Early life ==
Hampel was born in Poland just prior to World War II, on 4 October 1933, as the son of Polish Jews. His family escaped from Poland to spend the wartime years in Russia. Although his immediate family survived the Holocaust, much of his extended family did not.

When the war ended, he moved with his family to France, and then eventually to Australia. He was then educated at Melbourne High School and the University of Melbourne.

== Career ==
Hampel held numerous positions in the legal profession, such as Vice-President of the Law Council of Australia, Vice-Chairman of the Victorian Bar Institute and Chairman of the Constitution Commission of Victoria, for which he received a Centenary Medal.

From 2000, he was Professor of Trial Practice and Advocacy at Monash University, and Chairman of the Legal Practice Board of Victoria. He was also President of the International Institute of Forensic Studies. He was considered a leader in the teaching of advocacy, and together with his wife, trained war crime prosecutors at The Hague.

In 2006, he was appointed a Member of the Order of Australia.

== Personal life and death ==
Hampel was married to County Court of Victoria judge Felicity Hampel, SC, with whom he often taught. They have two children:

- Hampel's son, Antony Hampel, an event coordinator, was the de facto partner of Phoebe Handsjuk, who plunged to her death in the garbage chute of their luxury apartment in Melbourne, in 2010, aged 24. Despite a coroner's finding in 2014 that the death was a sleepwalking accident caused by a combination of depression, alcohol, and Stilnox, many questions remain. In 2018, Hampel's then girlfriend, Baillee Schneider, was found dead on the kitchen floor of her parents' home with a cord wrapped around her neck. The Victorian coroner ruled in 2020 that the death was a suicide.
- Hampel's daughter, Kristina Hampel, escaped conviction in 2014 for selling cocaine and possessing a can of tear gas.

Hampel died on 8 October 2024, at the age of 91.
