= Felicity Hampel =

Australian human rights lawyer and judge

Her Honour Judge Felicity Pia Hampel AM SC

Judge of the County Court of Victoria
- Incumbent
- Assumed office 9 February 2005

Personal details
- Born: 1 June 1955 (age 71)
- Spouse(s): George Hampel, KC
- Education: Genazzano FCJ College; Monash University
- Occupation: Judge, lawyer
- Awards: Victorian Honour Roll of Women (2001)

Felicity Pia Hampel AM SC (born 1 June 1955) is a prominent Australian human rights lawyer and, since 2005, judge of the County Court of Victoria. Hampel's career as a barrister began in 1981, and she became a Senior Counsel in 1996.

She has served as adjunct professor of law at Monash University, where she has often taught with her husband, former Supreme Court of Victoria Justice and Monash University Professor The Honourable George Hampel AM, KC. She has also served as President of Liberty Victoria, and as Deputy Co-convenor of the Australian Republican Movement in Victoria. Hampel has also served as a Victorian Law Reform Commissioner and is a former Convenor of the Women Barristers Association.

In the 2021 Queen's Birthday Honours Hampel was appointed Member of the Order of Australia "significant service to the judiciary, to legal organisations, and to women".

== Education ==
Hampel attended the Genazzano FCJ College in Kew, an eastern suburb of Melbourne. She holds a Bachelor of Arts and a Bachelor of Laws from Monash University.
