= Francine McNiff =

Australian lawyer (1948–2015)

Francine Valerie McNiff (24 March 1948 - 2 April 2015) was a legal scholar, and was the first female state magistrate in Victoria, Australia.

She completed a thesis in 1977 regarding children's court establishment in Victoria, at Monash University. In 1979 she produced a guide to the children's court practice.

She was appointed Children's Court Stipendary Magistrate in August 1983 after working as a senior legal officer within the Victorian public service. In November 2013, the University of Melbourne created the Francine V McNiff Chair in Human Rights Law, in recognition of her contributions to the field.

== Selected publications ==
- McNiff, Francine V (1979), "Confidentiality and minors: some ethical and legal considerations relevant to psychological counselling in schools", Australian Psychologist, 14 (Nov 1979): 301–310, ISSN 0005-0067
- McNiff, Francine V (1990), "Admissibility of computer output: tradition v technology", Essays on Computer Law (1990): 401–409
- Australia. Merit Protection and Review Agency; McNiff, Francine V; Australia. Merit Protection and Review Agency (1993), Digest of decisions of disciplinary appeal committees 1985-1992, Australian Government Publishing Service, ISBN 978-0-644-32942-2
