= Mal Logan =

Australian geographer (1931–2022)

Mal Logan AC

4th Vice-Chancellor and President of Monash University
- In office 1987–1996
- Preceded by: Raymond Martin
- Succeeded by: David Robinson

Personal details
- Born: 3 June 1931
- Died: 17 September 2022 (aged 91)
- Education: University of Sydney
- Profession: Academic educator and administrator

Malcolm Ian Logan AC (3 June 1931 – 17 September 2022) was an Australian geographer and university administrator. He served as Vice-Chancellor of Monash University from 1987 to 1996.

Logan grew up in country New South Wales, attending secondary school in the remote town of Tamworth. He moved to Sydney to complete an honours degree in geography at the University of Sydney, which he finished in 1951. After spending some time as a teacher in secondary schools, he returned to Sydney to complete his PhD and take up a position as Professor of Geography and Urban Planning. He then spent time at a range of universities overseas, living in the US and Nigeria. Later in his career, he became involved in both the World Bank and the OECD as an adviser on urban planning.

In 1971, Sir Louis Matheson, then vice-chancellor of Monash University, invited Logan to take up a professorship the university. Although Logan knew little about Monash at the time, he wanted to return to Australia and chose the university because it seemed "the liveliest and brightest place". Once there, he quickly rose through the administrative ranks, first as pro vice-chancellor and then, in 1987, he was appointed vice-chancellor.

His leadership at Monash marked the most drastic expansion of a university in Australian history. Prompted by the Dawkins reforms, Logan aggressively pursued Monash's takeover of a number of tertiary institutions. He was attracted to the notion of a "multiversity", similar to big state universities in the US such as the University of California and the University of Wisconsin–Madison. Monash went from one campus in Clayton with 20,000 students, to six Victorian campuses with 40,000 students. Through Logan's close personal relationships with members of the Hawke and Keating governments, he was able to obtain hundreds of millions of dollars in grants to develop the new campuses.

Logan argued that Australia's future lay in Asia. Consequently, he established a Monash teaching presence in Malaysia, Hong Kong, Singapore, Indonesia and Laos. He also oversaw the considerable increase in international students at Monash, particularly from Asia. He established the university's link with the Sunway Group, a relationship which led to the establishment of a Monash Malaysia Campus in 1998. With the increased inflow of international students, Monash's income increased dramatically, such that its annual reports were often discussed in financial newspapers. Reportedly, Logan was fond of citing the fact that Monash's annual budget was greater than the state of Tasmania's.

Logan retired in 1996. In that year's Australia Day Honours List he was appointed a Companion of the Order of Australia (AC), the highest honour which can be awarded to an Australian citizen, "for service to education, business and the arts, particularly through raising international awareness of Australian higher education services, and for promoting cooperation between countries".
