= John Rickard (economist) =

British economist

- Born: 12 July 1945 (age 80); Birmingham, England, United Kingdom
- Occupations: Professor, Economist, Vice-Chancellor
- Spouse: Veronica Rickard
- Children: James, Physiotherapist

Academic work
- Main interests: Economics, Game theory Financial Mathematics

John Anthony Rickard (born 12 July 1945) is a British economist, and Chair of Higher Education Governing Council of Melbourne Institute of Technology, Australia. Previously, he has been Vice Chancellor at Central Queensland University and the University of Southern Queensland, Dean at Monash University, Director of the Graduate School of Management at Deakin University and Foundation Professor (Financial Economics) at the University of Melbourne.

The author of three books and 81 articles, Professor Rickard has been an advisor to the governments of Victoria and Queensland on education and financial matters.

Rickard was born in Birmingham. He read mathematics at Queen Elizabeth College, University of London, where he was awarded a BSc (1st Class Honours) in 1966. He completed his studies at University College, London. His Thesis was a study of "Planetary Waves."

John and his wife Veronica first arrived in Australia aboard the Angelina Lauro in Fremantle in 1966 and first settled in Bulleen, Victoria, where John took up a lectureship in Mathematics.

Much of Professor Rickard's work in economics focuses on the development and validation of empirical models for customer repurchase decisions. Rickard was among the first to establish that customer satisfaction does not influence repurchase decisions directly, but rather indirectly via brand preference.
