= Raymond Martin (chemist) =

Australian chemist (1926–2020)

Professor Raymond Martin AO FAA FTSE FRACI

3rd Vice-Chancellor and President of Monash University
- In office 1977–1987
- Preceded by: William Scott
- Succeeded by: Mal Logan

Personal details
- Born: Raymond Leslie Martin; 3 February 1926 Melbourne, Victoria, Australia
- Died: 25 February 2020 (aged 94) Melbourne, Victoria, Australia
- Education: University of Melbourne; University of Cambridge; Australian National University
- Profession: Professor

Raymond Leslie Martin (3 February 1926 – 25 February 2020) was an Australian chemistry professor and university administrator. He was Vice-Chancellor of Monash University from 1977 to 1987.

== Early life ==
Martin grew up in Melbourne where he attended Scotch College Melbourne from grade 6 until attaining his Leaving Certificate. His father had to move suddenly to Sydney for work reasons, and whilst in Sydney Martin attended North Sydney Boys' High School for a year before returning to Melbourne for his tertiary education. His tertiary education was at the University of Melbourne and the University of Cambridge. He was an outstanding student, receiving numerous prizes and scholarships. He gained two doctorates from Cambridge and one doctorate from the Australian National University, all in chemistry.

== Professional career ==
In the 1950s, Martin was appointed lecturer at the University of New South Wales, before being appointed professor of chemistry at Melbourne University at just 36 years of age. During this time, he worked in private industry, and was also a visiting scholar at Columbia University. In 1972, he moved to ANU, where he was Dean of the Research School of Chemistry. In 1984 Martin was elected chairman of the International Atomic Weights Commission where he served until 1987.

In 1977, Martin was appointed the third Vice-Chancellor of Monash University. The position was originally intended to go to a British academic, Lord John Vaizey. However, negotiations between Vaizey and the University broke down after Vaizey's demands became increasingly outlandish. As a result, the position went to Martin, after founding Dean of Arts Bill Scott filled the vacancy for a year.

His leadership at Monash consolidated the extraordinary growth achieved by the University. In a sense, his vice-chancellorship was much quieter than the pioneering of Louis Matheson or the massive expansion of Mal Logan. This was partly because funding for Australian universities slowed during his tenure, while no major educational reforms were made by Australian governments.

When he stepped down from the lead role at Monash, he worked as a professor of chemistry at the University, before moving to Canberra to work in the Prime Minister's Department as Chair of the Australian Science and Technology Council.

Academic offices
Preceded by William Scott	Vice-Chancellor of Monash University; 1977–1987	Succeeded by Mal Logan
