= A. T. S. Sissons =

Australian pharmaceutical scientist

Alfred Thomas Stanley Sissons (22 April 1888 – 30 June 1975) was an Australian pharmaceutical scientist and academic. He was Dean of the Victorian College of Pharmacy for 42 years, from 1920 until 1962.

== Early life ==
Sissons was born in Malvern, an inner suburb of Melbourne, Victoria. He grew up in Brunswick, and was educated at Moreland State School, University High School and the Continuation School. He began working as a teacher at the Continuation School in 1907. He then attended the Melbourne Training College, before going on to gain a Bachelor of Science and a Diploma of Education from the University of Melbourne.

== Professional career ==
Sissons began his career in research as a scientist in Britain, working for the Ministry for Munitions at HM Factory, Gretna in Scotland. There, he accidentally inhaled nitrogen peroxide gas, which affected his health for the remainder of his life. He returned to Australia in 1920 to be appointed head of the Victorian College of Pharmacy, making him the first ever Australian-born head of a pharmacy school. He initiated wide-ranging reforms to the college's curriculum, introducing a number of new subjects and extending the course to four years in length.

During World War II, Sissons worked as part of a team of scientists providing emergency medicines for the Government's Medical Equipment Control Committee. Continuing his previous obligations, Sissons' team was forced to work during the evening, often well past midnight, leaving Sissons to walk home to get a few hours sleep before classes the next morning.

Sissons was a gifted teacher, who was loved and admired by the students of the college. By the time of his retirement in the early 1960s, he had taught more than two-thirds of Victoria's practising pharmacists. He died in Canberra in 1975, survived by his wife Jessie and their two sons. The Sissons Mural at the College of Pharmacy - reportedly the largest mural painting in Australia - commemorates his immense contribution to pharmacy. The college also holds L. Scott Pendlebury's portrait of Sissons.
