= Bill Charman =

Australian pharmaceutical scientist

- Born: William Neil Charman; Melbourne, Australia
- Education: Victorian College of Pharmacy (now part of Monash University)
- Awards: Order of Australia
- Scientific career
- Fields: pharmaceutical science drug delivery drug discovery
- Workplaces: Monash University

William Neil Charman AO is an Australian pharmaceutical scientist and educator known for his contributions to drug discovery, drug delivery, and pharmaceutical education. He is an Emeritus Sir John Monash Distinguished Professor at Monash University, where he previously served as Dean of the Faculty of Pharmacy and Pharmaceutical Sciences from 2007 to 2019, and as the Founding Director of the Monash Institute of Pharmaceutical Sciences (MIPS) from 2007 to 2017.

== Early life and education ==
Charman was born in Melbourne, Australia. He obtained a Bachelor of Pharmacy (B.Pharm) from the Victorian College of Pharmacy (now part of Monash University) in 1981, before completing his Ph.D. in pharmaceutical chemistry (with honours) in 1986 through the Takeru Higuchi Intersearch Ph.D. Program, a joint doctoral initiative between the Victorian College of Pharmacy and the University of Kansas, under the supervision of Professor Valentino J. Stella. He was awarded an Honorary Doctor of Science (D.Sc.) by the University of London in 2011 in recognition of his contributions to pharmaceutical science.

== Academic career ==
Following his doctorate studies, Charman began his professional career at the Sterling-Winthrop Research Institute in New York as a Senior Research Scientist and then Group Leader in pharmaceutical sciences between 1986 and 1988. He returned to Australia in 1989 to take up an academic position at the Victorian College of Pharmacy, where he progressed to Professor of Pharmaceutics in 1995.

In 2000, he co-founded the Centre for Drug Candidate Optimisation (CDCO) at Monash University, which pioneered an integrated academic model of translational drug discovery and development. Charman led the establishment of the Monash Institute of Pharmaceutical Sciences (MIPS) in 2007 and served as its Founding Director until 2017. MIPS became a leading international centre for drug discovery and the pharmaceutical sciences. As Dean of the Faculty of Pharmacy and Pharmaceutical Sciences from 2007 to 2019, he led a period of major transformation, expanding research capacity, strengthening industry collaboration, and redesigning the curriculum to prepare graduates for a global pharmaceutical landscape.

Under Charman’s leadership, the Monash pharmacy program achieved international distinction, ranked #1 in Australia, #1 in the Asia-Pacific, and among the top three globally in the QS World University Rankings by Subject (pharmacy and pharmacology) between 2015 and 2020.

Throughout his academic career, Charman has held numerous leadership and advisory positions with major international scientific, policy organizations and pharma companies. He chaired the Wellcome Trust Seeding Drug Discovery Funding Committee in London from 2006 to 2010, and was a member of the Medicines for Malaria Venture (MMV) Expert Scientific Advisory Committee in Geneva from 2005 to 2011, an advisor to the World Health Organization (WHO), served on scientific advisory panels for Pfizer Inc (New York) from 2010 to 2020. He has been a co-founder and non-executive board member of a number of drug delivery and drug discovery companies. He served as a Member of the International Pharmaceutical Federation (FIP) Bureau (Board of Directors) and as Chair of the Education Executive Committee (FIPEd) between 2015 and 2020.

== Research ==
Charman’s research integrates the disciplines of drug discovery, drug delivery, and pharmacokinetics, focusing particularly on neglected tropical diseases and translational medicine. His investigations into lymphatic drug transport, lipid-based formulations and oral drug delivery systems have advanced fundamental understanding, drug development and theirclinical application.

He played a pivotal role in the discovery and optimization of antimalarial drugs, including the ozonide compounds OZ277 (arterolane, Synriam®), approved for use in India and several African nations, and OZ439 (artefenomel), a next-generation potential single-dose therapy.

His collaborative research with the Medicines for Malaria Venture and other global consortia helped shape strategies for developing affordable, effective medicines for the developing world.

Charman has published more than 370 scientific papers and communications, delivered over 200 invited lectures internationally, and has an h-index exceeding 79, reflecting his wide-reaching influence in the pharmaceutical sciences. His research spans both fundamental science and translational application, bridging laboratory innovation and public health outcomes. In 2015, 2016 and 2018 he was recognized by Thomson Reuters/Clarivate Analytics as a highly-cited researcher (HiCi) in pharmacology and toxicology.

As Dean of Monash’s Faculty of Pharmacy and Pharmaceutical Sciences, he modernized the academic structure, integrating experiential learning, international partnerships, and competency-based curricula.

He was instrumental in founding PharmAlliance, an international partnership between Monash University, the University of North Carolina at Chapel Hill, and University College London, fostering collaboration in research, professional practice, and educational innovation.

Through his leadership of FIPEd, Charman played a central role in convening the First Global Conference on Pharmacy and Pharmaceutical Sciences Education in Nanjing, China, in 2016, which produced the Nanjing Statements a set of global frameworks for developing and strengthening the pharmacy workforce. His contributions helped redefine global standards in pharmaceutical education, practice, and professional development.

== Awards ==
In recognition of his distinguished service to tertiary education and pharmaceutical sciences, Charman was appointed an Officer of the Order of Australia (AO) in 2021. His career has been recognized with numerous international awards, including the GlaxoWellcome International Achievement Award (1999), the Australasian Pharmaceutical Sciences Association Medal (2005), the Controlled Release Society International Career Achievement in Oral Drug Delivery Award (2006) and the 2001, 2006, 2007 and 2010 Drug Discovery Project of the Year Awards from the Medicines for Malaria Venture (Geneva).

He received the FIP Pharmaceutical Sciences World Congress Research Achievement Award in 2007, the FIP Lifetime Achievement Award in Pharmaceutical Sciences in 2014, and the Asian Federation of Pharmaceutical Sciences Nagai Distinguished Scientist Award in 2015. More recently, he was honoured with the Kamal K. Midha Award for Exceptional Leadership from FIP in 2020 and the Takeru and Aya Higuchi Memorial Award from the Academy of Pharmaceutical Sciences and Technology, Japan in 2022.

Charman is a Fellow of the American Association of Pharmaceutical Scientists (FAAPS), an Honorary Fellow of the Royal Pharmaceutical Society (FRPharmS (Hon)), a Fellow of the International Pharmaceutical Federation (FFIP), and a Fellow of the Academy of Pharmaceutical Sciences and Technology, Japan (FAPSTJ).
