= Peter Franz Ignaz Deiters =

German lawyer and politician

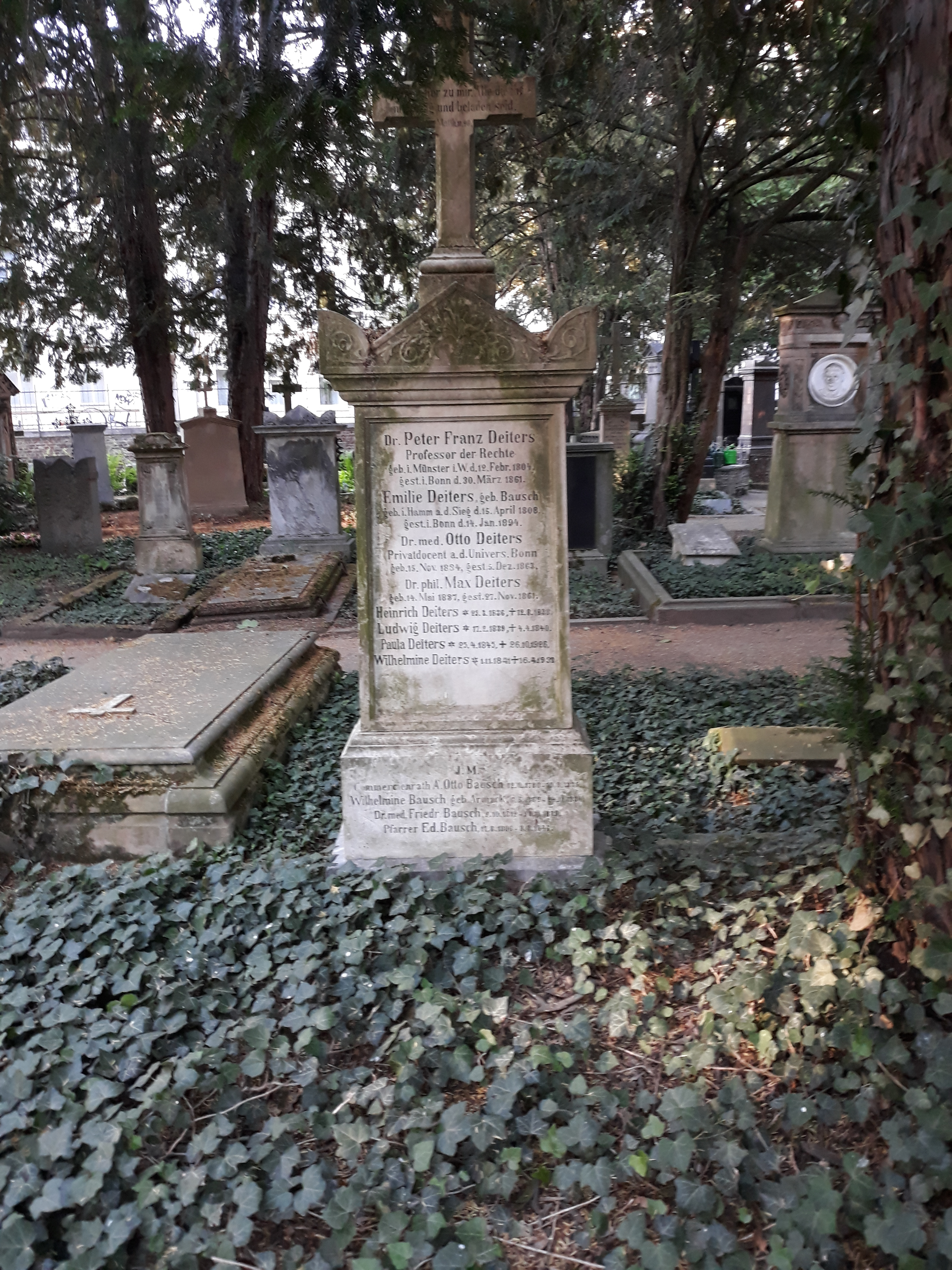
The family grave of "Peter Franz Deiters", his wife "Emilie Bausch", and descendants at the Old Cemetery of Bonn.

Peter Franz Ignaz Deiters (12 February 1804 in Münster – 30 March 1861) was a German lawyer and member of the 1848 Frankfurt Parliament.

Deiters studied in Berlin and Bonn, where he received his doctorate and his habilitation in 1825. In 1830, he became associate professor of German law, and in 1836 full professor. He was a member and for a long time chairman of the city council of Bonn, which elected him to the Frankfurt National Assembly in 1848. In the years 1845/46 and 1856/57 he was rector of the Rheinische Friedrich-Wilhelms-University of Bonn. He was a member of the Society of German Natural Scientists and Physicians (Gesellschaft Deutscher Naturforscher und Ärzte).

== Publications ==
- De civili cognatione et familiari nexu ex jure Romano et Germanico. Inaugural dissertation, 1825 Google E-Book
- Die eheliche Gütergemeinschaft nach dem Münster'schen Provinzialrechte, 1831
