= Franz-Josef Deiters =

Franz-Josef Deiters is a German-Australian literary scholar. From 2006 to 2020, he was associate professor in German Studies at Monash University. In December 2020, he was appointed as Honorary Associate with the Department of Germanic Studies at The University of Sydney. Before moving to Australia he taught at University of Tübingen (Germany), and has held visiting appointments at the University of Sarajevo (Bosnia and Herzegovina), Johann Wolfgang Goethe University of Frankfurt/M. (Germany) and at the University of Bergamo (Italy). Deiters is a Fellow of the Australian Academy of the Humanities.

Deiters's areas of research range across German literature from the 18th century to the present, the mediology of theatre, literary theory, and the intersection of literature and philosophy (amongst others).

== Publications ==
=== Authored books ===
- Sprechen über Deutschland - vom Standpunkt der Religion. Vier Stimmen im Zeitalter der Weltkriege. Eine kulturwissenschaftliche Studie. Berlin: Erich Schmidt, 2024 (= Philologische Studien und Quellen 294). ISBN 978-3-503-23902-3.
- Neues Welttheater? Zur Mediologie des Theaters der Neo-Avantgarden. Berlin: Erich Schmidt, 2022 (= Philologische Studien und Quellen 286). ISBN 978-3-503-20998-9.
- Verweltlichung der Bühne? Zur Mediologie des Theaters der Moderne. Berlin: Erich Schmidt, 2019 (= Philologische Studien und Quellen 274). ISBN 978-3-503-18813-0.
- Die Entweltlichung der Bühne. Zur Mediologie des Theaters der klassischen Episteme. Berlin: Erich Schmidt, 2015 (= Philologische Studien und Quellen 252). ISBN 978-3-503-16517-9.
- Auf dem Schauplatz des "Volkes": Strategien der Selbstzuschreibung intellektueller Identität von Herder bis Büchner und darüber hinaus. Freiburg i.Br./Berlin/Vienna: Rombach, 2006 (=Rombach Litterae 138). ISBN 3-7930-9444-8.
- Drama im Augenblick seines Sturzes: zur Allegorisierung des Dramas in der Moderne. Versuche zu einer Konstitutionstheorie. Berlin: Erich Schmidt, 1999 (= Philologische Studien und Quellen 155), ISBN 3-503-04921-5.

=== Edited books ===
- Helden/Heroes (co-editor). Baden-Baden: Nomos/Rombach Wissenschaft, 2023 (= Limbus: Australisches Jahrbuch für germanistische Literatur- und Kulturwissenschaft 16). ISBN 978-3-98858-015-3
- Mord/Murder (co-editor). Baden-Baden: Nomos/Rombach Wissenschaft, 2021 (= Limbus: Australisches Jahrbuch für germanistische Literatur- und Kulturwissenschaft 14). ISBN 978-3-96821-815-1
- Topos Österreich/Topos Austria (co-editor). Baden-Baden: Nomos/Rombach Wissenschaft, 2020 (= Limbus: Australisches Jahrbuch für germanistische Literatur- und Kulturwissenschaft 13). ISBN 9783968216485
- Sexualitäten/Sexualities (co-editor). Freiburg i.Br./Berlin/Wien: Rombach, 2019 (= Limbus: Australian Yearbook of German Literary and Cultural Studies 12).ISBN 978-3-7930-9952-9
- Der Erste Weltkrieg in der Dramatik. Deutsche und australische Perspektiven/The First World War in Drama. German and Australian Perspectives (co-editor). Stuttgart: J.B. Metzler, 2018 (= Abhandlungen zur Literaturwissenschaft). ISBN 9783476046710.
- Herkunft/Origin (co-editor). Freiburg i.Br./Berlin/Wien: Rombach, 2018 (= Limbus: Australian Yearbook of German Literary and Cultural Studies 11). ISBN 978-3-7930-9915-4.
- Angst (co-editor). Freiburg i.Br./Berlin/Wien: Rombach, 2017 (= Limbus: Australian Yearbook of German Literary and Cultural Studies 10). ISBN 978-3-7930-9882-9.
- Besuch/Visitation (co-editor). Freiburg i.Br./Berlin/Wien: Rombach, 2016 (= Limbus: Australian Yearbook of German Literary and Cultural Studies 9). ISBN 978-3-7930-9855-3.
- Altern/Ageing (co-editor). Freiburg i.Br./Berlin: Rombach, 2015 (= Limbus: Australian Yearbook of German Literary and Cultural Studies 8). ISBN 978-3-7930-9819-5.
- Krieg/War (co-editor). Freiburg i.Br./Berlin: Rombach, 2014 (= Limbus: Australian Yearbook of German Literary and Cultural Studies 7). ISBN 978-3-7930-9784-6.
- Topos Australien/Topos Australia (Mitherausgeber). Freiburg i.Br./Berlin/Vienna: Rombach, 2013 (= Limbus: Australian Yearbook of German Literary and Cultural Studies 6).ISBN 978-3-7930-9747-1.
- Die Aktualität der Romantik/The Actuality of Romanticism (co-editor). Freiburg i.Br./Berlin/Vienna: Rombach, 2012 (= Limbus: Australian Yearbook of German Literary and Cultural Studies 5). ISBN 978-3-7930-9704-4.
- Terror und Form/Terror and Form (co-editor). Freiburg i.Br./Berlin/Vienna: Rombach, 2011 (= Limbus: Australian Yearbook of German Literary and Cultural Studies 4).ISBN 978-3-7930-9667-2.
- Groteske Moderne – Moderne Groteske. Festschrift für Philip Thomson/Festschrift for Philip Thomson (co-editor). St. Ingbert: Röhrig Universitätsverlag, 2011 (= Transpositions: Australian Studies in German Literature, Philosophy and Culture 3). ISBN 978-3-86110-492-6.
- Nach der Natur/After Nature (co-editor). Freiburg i.Br./Berlin/Vienna: Rombach, 2010 (= Limbus: Australian Yearbook of German Literary and Cultural Studies 3). ISBN 978-3-7930-9635-1.
- Passagen: 50 Jahre Germanistik an der Monash Universität/Passages: 50 Years of German Studies at Monash University (co-editor). St. Ingbert: Röhrig Universitätsverlag, 2010 (=Transpositions: Australian Studies in German Literature, Philosophy and Culture 1). ISBN 978-3-86110-467-4.
- Narrative der Arbeit/Narratives of Work (co-editor). Freiburg i.Br./Berlin/Vienna: Rombach, 2009 (= Limbus: Australian Yearbook of German Literary and Cultural Studies 2). ISBN 978-3-7930-9595-8.
- Erinnerungskrisen/Memory Crises (co-editor). Freiburg i.Br./Berlin/Vienna: Rombach, 2008 (= Limbus: Australian Yearbook of German Literary and Cultural Studies 1).ISBN 978-3-7930-9541-5.
- Denken/Schreiben in der Krise: Existentialismus und Literatur (co-editor). St. Ingbert: Röhrig Universitätsverlag, 2004 (= Kunst und Gesellschaft 2). ISBN 3-86110-379-6.
- Die Geschichtlichkeit des Utopischen: für Eberhard Braun zum 60. Geburtstag (co-editor). St. Ingbert: Röhrig Universitätsverlag, 2001. ISBN 3-86110-277-3.
- Geschichtserfahrung im Spiegel der Literatur: Festschrift für Jürgen Schröder zum 65. Geburtstag (co-editor).Tübingen: Stauffenburg, 2000. ISBN 3-86057-654-2.
- Das Politische der Philosophie: über die gesellschaftliche Verantwortung politischen Denkens (co-editor). Mössingen-Talheim: Talheimer, 1993 (= Kritisches Wissen 7). ISBN 3-89376-021-0.
