= Zenon J. Pudlowski =

Zenon Jan Pudlowski (Pudłowski) (23 May 1943 - 4 February 2025) was a distinguished engineer and educator. He served as the director of the World Institute for Engineering and Technology Education located in Melbourne, Australia. Additionally, he held the position of visiting professor at the Slovak University of Technology in Bratislava, Slovakia.

== Education ==
Professor Pudlowski holds a Master of Electrical Engineering from the Academy of Mining and Metallurgy in Kraków, Poland, and a PhD from Jagiellonian University (also in Kraków).

== Career ==
From 1969 to 1976 he was a lecturer in the Institute of Technology at the Pedagogical University of Cracow. Between 1976 and 1979 he was a researcher at the Institute of Vocational Education, Warsaw, Poland, and from 1979 to 1981 was an adjunct professor in the Institute of Pedagogy at Jagiellonian University in Cracow. From 1981 to 1993 he was with the Department of Electrical Engineering at the University of Sydney, Sydney, Australia, where, in recent years, he was a senior lecturer.

In 1992 he was instrumental in establishing the International Faculty of Engineering at the Technical University of Łódź, Poland, of which he was the Foundation Dean (1992–95) and Professor (in absentia) (1992–99). He was also appointed honorary dean of the English Engineering Faculty at the Donetsk National Technical University in Ukraine in 1995.

Most recently, he was an adjunct professor in the College of Engineering and Engineering Technology at Northern Illinois University, DeKalb, Illinois, US (2013–2016). He was an adjunct senior research fellow in the Faculty of Arts at Monash University, Clayton, Melbourne, Australia (2009–2014). Between 1994 and 2009, he was associate professor, professor and director of the UNESCO International Centre for Engineering Education (UICEE) in the Faculty of Engineering at Monash University and was associate dean (engineering education) of the Faculty of Engineering between 1994 and 1998.

His research interests include circuit analysis, electrical machines and apparatus, implementation of computer technology in electrical engineering, software engineering, methodology of engineering education and industrial training, educational psychology and measurement, as well as human aspects of communication in engineering. His achievements to date have been published in books and manuals and in over 350 scientific papers, in refereed journals and conference proceedings.

Professor Pudlowski is currently a Fellow of the World Innovation Foundation (WIF), UK, and was a Fellow of the Institution of Engineers, Australia (resigned in 2012). He is a member of the editorial advisory board of the International Journal of Engineering Education, the International Journal of Technology and Engineering Education, and Botswana Journal of Technology. He is the founder of the Australasian Association for Engineering Education (AAEE) and the Australasian Journal of Engineering Education (AJEE). He was the first vice-president and executive director of the AAEE and the editor-in-chief of the AJEE since its inception in 1989 until 1997.

Currently, he is the editor-in-chief of the Global Journal of Engineering Education (GJEE) and the World Transactions on Engineering and Technology Education (WTE&TE). He was on the editorial boards of the International Journal of Electrical Engineering Education (1993–2005) and the European Journal of Engineering Education (1993–2005). He was the foundation secretary of the International Liaison Group for Engineering Education (ILG-EE) (1989–2006) and was its chairman (2006–2008).

Pudlowski was a member of the UNESCO International Committee on Engineering Education (ICEE) (1992–2000). He has chaired and organised numerous international conferences and meetings. He was the academic convener of the second World Conference on Engineering Education and the general chairman of the East–West Congresses on Engineering Education. He was general chairman of the UNESCO 1995 International Congress of Engineering Deans and Industry Leaders and general chairman of the Global Congress on Engineering Education.

== Honors ==
He received the inaugural AAEE Medal for Distinguished Contributions to Engineering Education (Australasia) in 1991 and was awarded the Order of the Egyptian Syndicate of Engineers for "contributions to the development of engineering education on both national and international levels" in 1994.

In June 1996, Pudlowski received an honorary doctorate from the Donetsk National Technical University, Donetsk, Ukraine in recognition of his contributions to international engineering education; in July 1998 he was awarded an honorary doctorate in Technology from Glasgow Caledonian University, Glasgow, Scotland, and in February 2008 he received an honorary doctorate in Engineering from Kingston University, London, England. He was elected a member of the Ukrainian Academy of Engineering Sciences in 1997.

In 2002, he was awarded the title of an Honorary Professor of Tomsk Polytechnic University, Tomsk, Russia, and was an External Professor at Aalborg University, Aalborg, Denmark (2002-2007). He is listed in 14 Who's Who encyclopedias, including the Marquis Who's Who in the World.

In 2009, he was appointed vice-chairman of the board of governors of the Commonwealth Science and Technology Academy for Research (C-STAR), based in Chennai, India.

In January 2024, The Senate of Gdańsk University of Technology (GUT), Gdańsk, Poland, during its session, enacted a resolution to bestow the inaugural title of Honorary Professor of Gdańsk University of Technology upon Prof. Z.J. Pudlowski. This resolution came into force on the day of its adoption.

In June 2024, the Scientific Board of Slovak University of Technology (STU) in Bratislava, Slovakia, unanimously awarded Professor Pudlowski an honorary doctorate in recognition of his long-term cooperation with the University.
