= Marcia Neave =

Australian legal academic and judge

The Honourable Marcia Neave AO FASSA FAAL

Judge of the Court of Appeal
- In office 22 February 2006 – 23 August 2014

Personal details
- Born: Marcia Ann Forster; 23 August 1944 (age 81) Melbourne, Victoria, Australia
- Spouse: Colin Neave
- Children: Two
- Education: Presbyterian Ladies' College, Melbourne
- Alma mater: University of Melbourne
- Occupation: Legal academic
- Profession: Judge

Marcia Ann Neave AO FASSA FAAL (born 23 August 1944) is an Australian legal academic and judge, who was appointed to the Supreme Court of Victoria, Court of Appeals division on 22 February 2006. She retired from the bench on 23 August 2014 to become commissioner of the Royal Commission into Family Violence.

Before her appointment, Neave was the foundation Chair of the Victorian Law Reform Commission and Professor of Law at Monash University. She is the only academic to be appointed to the Supreme Court in Victoria's history, with the vast majority of judges practising as barristers prior to being invited to the bench. In 1985, Neave, then Reader in Law at the University of Melbourne, chaired a board of inquiry into prostitution in Victoria, which recommended legalisation of prostitution under defined conditions, removal of most sanctions against prostitutes, and the use of planning controls to control the locations of brothels. Most of the recommendations were accepted by the Cain Labor government, and became law in 1986.

In the Queen's Birthday Honours of 1999, Neave was made an Officer of the Order of Australia (AO) for her services to the law, and in 2001, she was awarded the Centenary Medal. She was inducted onto the Victorian Honour Roll of Women in 2006.

In December 2016, Neave retired from the bench of the Court of Appeal to chair the Royal Commission into Family Violence.

Neave has held a number of distinguished academic positions, including chairs at four different Australian universities, and membership of the Hauser Global Law Faculty of the New York University School of Law. She is a fellow of the Academy of the Social Sciences in Australia, and a life member of the Australian Institute of Judicial Administration, of which she has been a member for more than 10 years. She was educated at Presbyterian Ladies' College in Melbourne.

== See also ==
- List of Judges of the Supreme Court of Victoria
