= Richard Gunstone =

Australian physics academic

Richard Francis Gunstone
- Born: Australia
- Occupations: Academic and researcher

Academic background
- Education: BSc., Physics and Geophysics; BEd., Science Education and Measurement; PhD., Science Education
- Alma mater: University of Melbourne; Monash University
- Thesis: "Structural Outcomes of Physics Instruction"

Academic work
- Institutions: Monash University

Richard Francis Gunstone is an Australian academic and researcher. He is the Emeritus Professor of Science and Technology Education at Monash University. He has authored or co-authored 8 books along with various monographs and chapters and has published over a hundred research papers. He has coedited 6 books providing reports of contemporary research in a particular area of science education. His principle research areas include teaching, curriculum, assessment, teacher development (preservice and inservice teacher education), science, physics and engineering.

Gunstone is a Fellow of the Academy of the Social Sciences in Australia and a Life Member of the Science Teachers' Association of Victoria. In 2014 he was presented with the Distinguished Contributions to Science Education through Research Award of the National Association for Research in Science Teaching in USA. He developed and edited the first encyclopedia of science education research and development which was published in 2015. This encyclopedia is a reference work with contributions from 353 different authors from 36 different countries.

== Education ==
Gunstone completed his bachelor's degree in Physics and Geophysics from University of Melbourne in 1963. He received his Trained Secondary Teachers Certificate in 1960 from the Secondary Teachers College. In 1973, Gunstone completed his post graduate studies in science education and measurement from Monash University. Later in 1980, he received his doctorate degree from the same institution.

== Career ==
Gunstone joined Faculty of Education at Monash University as a tutor of science teaching and physics teaching in 1971 and then as a lecturer in 1972. He climbed through the ranks at the university as an associate professor from 1988 till 1995. He was a Professor of Science and Technology Education from 1995 till 2005. He founded and directed the International Centre for the Study of Science and Mathematics Curriculum at Monash-Kings College from 2002 till 2005. At Monash University, he has held several administrative positions. He served as associate dean of research for 2 consecutive terms from 1996 till 2002; associate dean from 2003 till 2004 and completed two tenures as acting dean between 1999 and 2009. In 2006, he became an emeritus professor at Monash University and remains active in collaborative research and writing and mentoring.

From 2016 till 2018, Gunstone served as Extraordinary (honorary) Professor at North-West University. He has served as a visiting scholar and external assessor at various universities in Asia, Europe, North America and Oceania.

== Research and work ==
Gunstone's key research areas include constructivist framework studies in teaching, learning and teaching development with special focus on preservice and inservice, curriculum assessment, science education; particularly in physics and engineering.

=== Curriculum ===
In January 1975, Gunstone co-authored with G. W. Beeson an article about the role of teachers in curriculum decisions. In this article Beeson and Gunstone discuss the science curriculum decisions in schools in Victoria and the effects of school curriculum autonomy present at that time in Victoria in Grades 7 to 10. Their research explores the extent and the type of the curriculum decision making the teachers do in schools that have no eternally prescribed courses. Evidence of weak decision making was recorded however, the teachers were found to be more involved in the decision making.

In 2007, Gunstone co-authored with Dorothy V. Smith an article titled Science Curriculum in the Market Liberal Society of the Twenty-first Century: 'Re-visioning' the Idea of Science for All. Smith and Gunstone discuss three international movements in science education and their influence on the science curriculum. They presented arguments for a 'Science for All' curriculum.

=== Physics education ===
Gunstone's research on Physics education began in the late 1970s. He researched in 1978 about the role of language and discussion in the learning of physics along with the present concerns about the role and comprehension of language in science, and related it to the learning and the concepts of physics in secondary schools. With colleagues he has proposed learning and teaching strategies for the study of physics, including 'Predict-Observe-Explain' that is now widely used in teaching and research. In 1981, in the article about the impact of physics instruction on the cognitive structure and performance, Gunstone used a modified word-association technique and Venn diagrams to show that different teaching approaches resulted in different structures of ideas in memory and performance differences for conceptual problems and applying the learned knowledge to new situations.

In a publication about the perception of students regarding the learning and teaching experience of first year university physics, Gunstone and his colleagues study the transition in the study of physics from school to university. This research focuses on physics students' perceptions about the content and the teaching methodology of physics in the first year of university.

=== Teaching and teacher education ===
Teaching methodology and procedures have been a central research area of Gunstone since the late 1980s. In an article in 1999 about effective teaching methods to improve students' understanding of physics, Gunstone and his co-authors, Brian McKittrick and Pamela Mulhall explain the method and applications of a technique called Conceptual Understanding Procedure (CUP) for facilitating a student's comprehension of difficult physics concepts. Gunstone and Loughran's research about the impact of self-study in teaching and research in 1996 used a longitudinal school based professional development program designed for science teachers to study about the various perspectives about self-study in teaching and research. They discussed self-study as being personal and collaborative as compared to being related with teaching and research. Research about the views of physics teachers regarding learning and various approaches to teaching physics was conducted in 2012 by Gunstone with Pamela Mulhall to address the decline of student interest about physics and science related subjects. This research adds further to the prior work on classification of teachers based on the traditional and the conceptual change teaching approaches used. The study concluded that the views of teachers who promoted conceptual change were constructivist while the teachers that supported the traditional, transmission method of teaching were of the absorptionist views. Again working with colleagues, including Jeff Northfield, he has developed research-based structures for and approaches to the pre-service education and in-service education of science teachers that have had impact in many countries.

Gunstone was awarded the 'Distinguished Contributions to Research' award for his research about science learning and teaching and teacher education.

== Awards and honors ==
- 1991 - JRST Award for Most Outstanding Paper, Journal of Research in Science Teaching
- 2002 - Life Membership, Science Teachers' Association of Victoria
- 2003 - Fellowship, Academy of the Social Sciences in Australia
- 2014 - "Distinguished Contributions to Research" award, National Association for Research in Science Teaching

== Bibliography ==
=== Selected books ===
- Probing Understanding (1992), with Richard T. White.
- The Content of Science: A Constructivist Approach to Its Teaching and Learning (1994), with Peter J. Fensham and Richard T. White
- Encyclopedia of Science Education (2015). Gunstone is the editor of this encyclopaedia.

=== Selected articles ===
- Gunstone, R.F., & White, R.T. (1981). Understanding of gravity-related phenomena. Problem Solving, 2 (12), 4–8.
- Fensham, P.J., Gunstone, R.F. & White, R.T. (Eds). (1994/2013). The content of science: A constructivist approach to its teaching and learning. London: Falmer Press/London: Taylor & Francis. (xii + 278 pp.)
- Gunstone, R.F. (1990). Reconstructing theory from practical experience. In B. Woolnough (Ed.), Practical Science. Milton Keynes: Open University Press, 67–77.
- White, R.T., & Gunstone, R.F. (1989). Metalearning and conceptual change. International Journal of Science Education, 11, 577–586.
- Baird, J.R., Fensham, P.J., Gunstone, R.F., & White, R.T. (1991). The importance of reflection in improving science teaching and learning. Journal of Research in Science Teaching, 28, 163–182.
- Gunstone, R.F., & Champagne, A.B. (1990). Promoting conceptual change in the laboratory. In E. HegartyHazel (Ed.), The science curriculum and the student laboratory. London: Croom Helm, 159-182
- Champagne, A.B., Klopfer, L.E., & Gunstone, R.F. (1982). Cognitive research and the design of science instruction. Educational Psychologist, 17, 31–53.
- Gunstone, R.F. & Northfield, J.R. (1994). Metacognition and learning to teach. International Journal of Science Education, 16, 523–537.
- Mulhall, P., McKittrick, B. & Gunstone, R. A perspective on the resolution of confusions in the teaching of electricity. (2001). Research in Science Education, 31, 575–587.
- Thong, W. M. & Gunstone, R. (2008). Some student conceptions of electromagnetic induction. Research in Science Education, 38, 31–44.
