= Michael Cowley =

Australian physiologist

Michael Cowley is an Australian physiologist. He is best known for his mapping of the neural circuits involved in metabolism and obesity and diabetes treatment. He is a professor in the Department of Physiology at Monash University in the Faculty of Biomedical and Psychological Sciences. He is also a director of the Australian diabetes drug development company, Verva Inc, and director of the Monash Obesity & Diabetes Institute.

Cowley is a Fellow of the Australian Academy of Technological Sciences and Engineering, a Veski Innovation Fellow and, in 2009, was awarded The Australian Science Minister's Prize for Australian Life Scientist of the Year. In 2014 Cowley was the recipient of the inaugural Jacques Miller Medal for Experimental BioMedicine from the Australian Academy of Science.

Cowley's work has mapped the neural circuits in the brain that sense nutrients and fat to control appetite and body weight. He has published more than 75 papers and chapters, is the inventor of 85 patents, and the co-founder of Orexigen Therapeutics, a publicly listed (NASDAQ: OREX) San Diego biotech company, where he served as the chief scientific officer until December 2008, when he returned to Monash University.

== Education ==
Cowley has a Bachelor of Science from both the University of Melbourne and Monash University. He obtained his PhD at Prince Henry's Institute of Medical Research at Monash Medical Centre, before obtaining a post-doctoral fellowship at The Vollum Institute in Oregon.

== Career ==
Cowley began his research career at Monash University and at the Prince Henry Institute of Medical Research. He then went to the US, where he was assistant professor at Oregon Health and Science University. He also worked at the biopharmaceutical company Neurocrine Biosciences in California. He later founded his own company, Orexigen Therapeutics Inc (NASDAQ: OREX), which he took public in April 2007, raising US$255M to fund the drug development program. He is the inventor of 10 families of patent applications, has published more than 75 papers, with 85 patents relating to obesity.

In 2014, Cowley was the recipient of the inaugural Jacques Miller Medal for Experimental BioMedicine from the Australian Academy of Science.

In 2009, he was awarded the (Australian) Science Minister's Prize for Life Scientist of the Year and a Pfizer Australia Senior Research Fellowship.

Cowley was the inventor of several drugs, including Contrave®, which the FDA approved in 2014.
