= Drug action =

The action of drugs on the human body (or any other organism's body) is called pharmacodynamics, and the body's response to drugs is called pharmacokinetics. The drugs that enter an individual tend to stimulate certain receptors, ion channels, act on enzymes or transport proteins. As a result, they cause the human body to react in a specific way.

Based on drug action on receptors, there are 2 different types of drugs:

- Agonists – they stimulate and activate the receptors
- Antagonists – they disable the agonists from stimulating the receptors

Once the receptors are activated, they either trigger a particular response directly on the body, or they trigger the release of hormones and/or other endogenous drugs in the body to stimulate a particular response.

== Short note on receptors ==
Drugs interact with receptors by bonding at specific binding sites. Most receptors are made up of proteins, and the drugs can therefore interact with the amino acids to change the conformation of the receptor proteins.

These interactions are very basic, just like that of other chemical bondings:

=== Ionic bonds ===
Mainly occur through attractions between opposite charges; for example, between protonated amino (on salbutamol) or quaternary ammonium (e.g. acetylcholine), and the dissociated carboxylic acid group. Similarly, the dissociated carboxylic acid group on the drug can bind with amino groups on the receptor.

This type of bond is very strong, and varies with the inverse of the distance between the atoms so that it can act over large distances.

Cation-π interactions can also be classified as ionic bonding. This type of interaction occurs when a cation, e.g. acetylcholine, interacts with the negative π bonds on an aromatic group of the receptor.

Ion-dipole and dipole-dipole bonds have similar interactions, but are more complicated and are weaker than ionic bonds.

=== Hydrogen bonds ===
There is a small but significant attraction between hydrogen atoms and polar functional groups (e.g. the hydroxyl [-OH] group). These so-called hydrogen bonds only act over short distances, and are dependent on the correct alignment between functional groups.

Receptors are located on all cells in the body. The same receptor can be located on different organs, and even on different types of tissues. There are also different subtypes of receptor which elicit different effects in response to the same agonist. For example, there are two types of histamine receptor: H1 and H2. Activation of the H1 subtype receptor causes contraction of smooth muscle, whereas activation of the H2 receptor stimulates gastric secretion.

It is this phenomenon that gives rise to drug specificity. Of course, drugs do not only act on receptors: they also act on ion channels, enzymes, and cell transporter proteins. These hydrogen bonds are so powerful than the ionic bonds.

== How shape of drug molecules affect drug action ==
When talking about the shape of molecules, biochemists are mainly concerned with the three-dimensional conformation of drug molecules. There are many isomers of a particular drug, and each one will have its own effects. Differences in isomer affect not only what the drug activates, but also changes the potency of each drug.

=== Potency ===
Potency is a measure of how much a drug is required in order to produce a particular effect. Therefore, only a small dosage of a high potency drug is required to induce a large response. The other terms used to measure the ability of a drug to trigger a response are:

- Intrinsic Activity which defines:
  - Agonists as having Intrinsic Activity = 1
  - Antagonists as having Intrinsic Activity = 0
  - and, Partial Agonist as having Intrinsic Activity between 0 and 1
- Intrinsic Efficacy also measures the different activated state of receptors, and the ability for a drug to cause maximum response without having to bind to all the receptors.

=== The specificity of drugs ===
Drug companies invest significant effort in designing drugs that interact specifically with particular receptors, since non-specific drugs can cause more side effects.

An example is the endogenous drug acetylcholine (ACh). ACh is used by the parasympathetic nervous system to activate muscarinic receptors and by the neuromuscular system to activate nicotinic receptors. However, the compounds muscarine and nicotine can each preferentially interact one of the two receptor types, allowing them to activate only one of the two systems where ACh itself would activate both.

=== Affinity ===
The specificity of drugs cannot be talked about without mentioning the affinity of the drugs. The affinity is a measure of how tightly a drug binds to the receptor. If the drug does not bind well, then the action of the drug will be shorter and the chance of binding will also be less. This can be measured numerically by using the dissociation constant K_{D}. The value of K_{D} is the same as the concentration of drug when 50% of receptors are occupied.

The equation can be expressed as K_{D} = $\frac{[drug][receptor]}{[complex]}$

But the value of K_{D} is also affected by the conformation, bonding and size of the drug and the receptor. The higher the K_{D} the lower the affinity of the drug.
