= 2021 Queen's Birthday Honours (Australia) =

Australian honours list 2021

The 2021 Queen's Birthday Honours for Australia were announced on 14 June 2021 by the Governor-General, David Hurley.

The Birthday Honours are appointments by some of the 16 Commonwealth realms of Queen Elizabeth II to various orders and honours to reward and highlight good works by citizens of those countries. The Birthday Honours are awarded as part of the Queen's Official Birthday celebrations during the month of June.

== Order of Australia ==
General division ribbon

Military division ribbon

=== Companion of the Order of Australia (AC) ===
==== General Division ====
- Frances Adamson – For eminent service to public administration through the advancement of Australia's diplomatic, trade and cultural interests, particularly with the People's Republic of China and the Indo-Pacific region, to innovative foreign policy development and high level program delivery, and as the 36th Governor appointed in South Australia.
- The Most Reverend Dr Phillip John Aspinall – For eminent service to the Anglican Church of Australia, to the development of ecumenical relationships and professional standards, and through commitment to social justice and welfare.
- Barbara Avalon Baker – For eminent service to the people of Tasmania through leading contributions to the law, to the judiciary and to the administration of justice, particularly in the area of family law, to professional legal organisations, and as a mentor and role model for young women, and as the 29th Governor appointed in Tasmania.
- Emeritus Professor Kurt Lambeck, AO – For eminent service to science, particularly to geophysics and geodesy, through research roles at the national and international level, to professional scientific organisations, and to education.
- David Graeme McAllister, AM – For eminent service to the performing arts, particularly to ballet both nationally and internationally, to artistic directorship and dance education, and as a mentor.

=== Officer of the Order of Australia (AO) ===
==== General Division ====
- Professor Philip Geoffrey Alston – For distinguished service to the law, particularly in the area of international human rights, and to legal education.
- Philip John Bacon, AM – For distinguished service to the arts, to social and cultural organisations, and through support for young artists.
- Professor Peter Mark Bartold, AM – For distinguished service to dentistry, to periodontal research and education, and to professional dental organisations.
- Professor Adrian Bauman – For distinguished service to public health, to the prevention of chronic disease, and to tertiary education.
- The Honourable Patricia Anne Bergin, SC – For distinguished service to the law, and to the judiciary, to legal administration, and as a mentor and advisor.
- Emeritus Professor Colin William Binns – For distinguished service to medical research, to tertiary education, to public health policy and human nutrition.
- Russell Stewart Boyd – For distinguished service to the visual arts as a cinematographer of Australian feature films and television productions.
- Gerard Patrick Bradley – For distinguished service to public administration, to economic policy, and to the community of Queensland.
- Suzi Carp – For distinguished service to medical research, to children, and to the community through leadership roles.
- Dr Bridget Mary Carty – For distinguished service to people who are deaf or hard of hearing, to education and research, and to the community.
- Dr Patrick Toby Hewlett Coates – For distinguished service to renal medicine, to professional medical organisations, and to tertiary education.
- Everald Ernest Compton, AM – For distinguished service to the aged welfare sector through advocacy and advisory roles, to the Uniting Church in Australia, and to the community.
- Peta-Louise Mary Credlin – For distinguished service to parliament and politics, to policy development, and to the executive function of government.
- Neale Francis Daniher, AM – For distinguished service to people with Motor Neurone Disease and their families through advocacy, public education and fundraising initiatives.
- Professor Stephen Misha Davis, AM – For distinguished service to medical education, to stroke research, and to the management of cerebrovascular disease.
- Erika Elizabeth Feller – For distinguished service to the international community, to the recognition and protection of human rights, and to refugee law.
- Professor Susan Fletcher – For distinguished service to medical research, to neurological science, and to the treatment and support of those with Muscular Dystrophy.
- Dr Ian Richard Freckelton, QC – For distinguished service to the law, and to the legal profession, across fields including health, medicine and technology.
- Professor Paul Philip Glasziou – For distinguished service to medical education and standards, and to evidence-based medical research.
- The Honourable Michael Patrick Grant – For distinguished service to the law, and to the judiciary, particularly as Chief Justice of the Northern Territory.
- Dr Vanessa Ann Guthrie – For distinguished service to the minerals and resources sector, and as a role model for women in business.
- Warwick Donald Hemsley – For distinguished service to the arts, to the community, and to the residential development sector.
- Dr Michael Henderson – For distinguished service to motor vehicle and motorsport safety, and to the prevention of road trauma.
- Ian William Hicks, AM – For distinguished service to the community through philanthropic support for the arts, education and social welfare bodies.
- Professor Donald William Howie – For distinguished service to medicine in the field of orthopaedics, and to professional medical organisations.
- Kay Elizabeth Hull, AM – For distinguished service to rural and regional communities through health, skills development, and agricultural organisations.
- Peter Alexander Ivany, AM – For distinguished service to the community as a supporter of sporting, arts, film, not-for-profit, and natural science organisations.
- Cameron James Kerr – For distinguished service to wildlife conservation, to animal science education, and to zoological associations.
- Janine Anne Kirk, AM – For distinguished service to the community through leadership and advisory roles in not-for-profit organisations.
- Dr Evans Lagudah – For distinguished service to agriculture and food science as a researcher in the area of wheat genetics.
- Professor Jane Alexandra McAdam – For distinguished service to international refugee law, particularly to climate change and the displacement of people.
- Clinical Professor Michael John McDaniel – For distinguished service to Indigenous tertiary education, to the advancement of social cohesion through reconciliation, to the performing arts, and to the community.
- Professor Geoffrey Lionel Metz, AM – For distinguished service to medicine, to medical education both nationally and internationally, and to professional medical organisations.
- Christine Nixon, APM – For distinguished service to law enforcement, to women in policing, and to tertiary education.
- Professor Leonard George Notaras, AM – For distinguished service to medical administration in the Northern Territory, and to professional organisations.
- Dr Ann Margaret O'Neill – For distinguished service to the community through support for people affected by family and domestic violence.
- Emeritus Professor Robert Baden Offord – For distinguished service to tertiary education in the field of human rights, social justice, and cultural diversity.
- Dr Suzanne Mary Packer, AM – For distinguished service to children through roles in health, welfare and protection initiatives.
- Emeritus Professor Lester John Peters, AM – For distinguished service to medicine, particularly to radiation oncology, and to professional medical groups.
- Clinical Professor Carol Anne Pollock – For distinguished service to medical research, education and science, to nephrology, and to clinical practice and governance.
- Dr Stephen Rich Rintoul AAM – For distinguished service to climate science through oceanographic and Antarctic research and policy development.
- Paul Salteri, AM – For distinguished service to the community through philanthropic support for a range of organisations, and to business.
- Professor Richard Anthony Scolyer – For distinguished service to medicine, particularly in the field of melanoma and skin cancer, and to national and international professional organisations.
- Kenneth John Smith – For distinguished service to public administration, and to public sector leadership and education.
- Douglas Norman Snedden – For distinguished service to the community through social welfare, health, and cultural institutions.
- Emeritus Professor Alan Osbourne Trounson – For distinguished service to medical science, and to in vitro fertilisation and stem cell technologies.
- Ian Richard Trust – For distinguished service to the Indigenous community, to economic and social development, and to emerging first nations leaders.
- Professor Anne Frances Twomey – For distinguished service to the law, to legal education, and to public education on constitutional matters.
- Emeritus Professor James Stanislaus Williams, AM – For distinguished service to the physical sciences, to tertiary education, and to professional scientific organisations.
- Professor Stephen Donald Wilton – For distinguished service to medical research, to neurological science, and to the treatment of Muscular Dystrophy.

==== Military Division ====
Army

- Major General Adam George Findlay, AM – For distinguished service and exceptional leadership as Special Operations Commander Australia, Commander Special Operations Joint Task Force - Iraq, and Commander of the 7th Brigade.

=== Member of the Order of Australia (AM) ===
==== General Division ====
- Dr Richard Abbott – For significant service to medicine, and to leukaemia research.
- Soheil Abedian – For significant service to the community, and to the property development sector.
- Emeritus Professor Jaynie Louise Anderson – For significant service to tertiary education, particularly to art history in Australia.
- Dr John T. Andrews – For significant service to nuclear medicine, and to professional societies.
- Professor Philip Edmund Aylward – For significant service to medicine, and to community health administration.
- Dr Brian Keith Babington – For significant service to children through safety and well-being initiatives.
- Dr Ian Charles Baldwin – For significant service to critical care nursing, and to medical research.
- Professor Kylie Ball – For significant service to physical activity and nutrition education.
- Professor James Gerard Barber – For significant service to tertiary education administration, and to youth.
- Associate Professor Lennie Barblett – For significant service to tertiary education, and to early childhood teaching.
- Narelle Joyce Barker – For significant service to education, and to the community.
- Dr Gavin John Becker – For significant service to medicine, to nephrology, and to professional societies.
- Dr John Leslie Bennett – For significant service to education, to mathematics, and to curriculum standards.
- Professor Michael Heywood Bennett – For significant service to medical education, and to hyperbaric medicine.
- Noel Anthony Beven – For significant service to horticulture, to agriculture, and to rural youth.
- The Honourable Mark Alexander Birrell – For significant service to the infrastructure sector, and to business.
- Howard Michael Blake – For significant service to accounting, and to the public sector.
- Dr Soren Blau – For significant service to forensic medicine, and to scientific organisations.
- Andrew Wayne Blode – For significant service to children as an advocate for protection policy standards.
- Dr Lissant Mary Bolton – For significant service to the museums sector, and to anthropology.
- Simon George Bouda – For significant service to the television and print media, and to the community.
- Brian James Boulton – For significant service to the law, and to the judiciary, particularly to District Courts.
- John Bowe – For significant service to motorsport as a touring car driver.
- Mieke Brandon – For significant service to dispute resolution and mediation.
- Anne Bremner – For significant service to people who are deaf or hard of hearing through sporting associations.
- Emeritus Professor John Barnard Bremner – For significant service to tertiary education, and to biomolecular science.
- Michael Ronald Brennan – For significant service to the law, and to community organisations.
- Professor Margaret Susan Brock – For significant service to tertiary education, and to Indigenous history.
- Professor Kevin John Brophy – For significant service to tertiary education, and to creative writing.
- Shayne Ann Brown – For significant service to medicine through orthoptic associations.
- Rosalind Elaine Butler – For significant service to women, to vocational education, and to gender equity.
- Marcus Canning – For significant service to the arts, and to the community of Perth.
- Susan Gail Carr – For significant service to interior design, to education, and to women in business.
- Elizabeth Jane Carrigan – For significant service to community health, notably to pain management.
- Loretta Carroll – For significant service to the livestock industry, and to the community.
- Peter Carroll – For significant service to the performing arts as an actor.
- Joseph Carrozzi – For significant service to business, and to the community through multicultural and not-for-profit organisations.
- Dr Annette Elizabeth Carruthers – For significant service to community health, and to people with Multiple Sclerosis.
- Emeritus Professor David John Carter – For significant service to tertiary education, and to cultural and literary studies.
- Gregory Thomas Chamberlin – For significant service to the print media through editorial roles.
- Professor Judith Lynne Charlton – For significant service to road safety and injury prevention research.
- Kerry Anne Chikarovski – For significant service to the Parliament of New South Wales, and to the community.
- Roland Desmond Chin – For significant service to the community of the Northern Territory.
- Lee Christofis – For significant service to the performing arts, particularly to dance.
- Clinical Professor Flavia Cicuttini – For significant service to medicine, and to musculoskeletal disease research.
- Dr Leon Wakefield Clark – For significant service to medical administration, and to healthcare delivery.
- Elizabeth Ann Clarke – For significant service to harness racing in Victoria, and to the community.
- Emeritus Professor Deborah Joy Clayton – For significant service to tertiary education, and to international study programs.
- Associate Professor Lynette Elsie Clearihan – For significant service to medicine, and to medical education.
- Anthony John Cochrane – For significant service to sports administration, and to entertainment production.
- Joanna Collins – For significant service to the community through charitable initiatives.
- Richard Thomas Collins – For significant service to the community through charitable initiatives.
- Professor John Connell – For significant service to tertiary education, particularly to the geosciences.
- Dr John Edward Coolican – For significant service to dentistry in the field of orthodontics, and to rugby union.
- Kate Copeland – For significant service to health infrastructure planning and management.
- Stephanie Copus-Campbell – For significant service to aid and development initiatives in Papua New Guinea.
- Colin Cornish – For significant service to the performing arts, to music, and to youth.
- Philip John Cornish – For significant service to the telecommunications sector, and to the community.
- Elizabeth Ann Cousins – For significant service to the community through charitable initiatives.
- Ian Scott Cox – For significant service to people who are homeless, and to the community.
- Professor Lawrence Edward Cram – For significant service to tertiary education, and to astronomy and astrophysics.
- Julian Hillary Cribb – For significant service to science communication.
- Dr Elizabeth Anne Crock – For significant service to nursing, particularly to people living with HIV/AIDS.
- John Roger Crosby – For significant service to agribusiness, and to the farming sector.
- Emeritus Professor Ann Curthoys – For significant service to tertiary education, to social history, and to research.
- Dr Allan Lindsay Curtis – For significant service to environmental management education and research.
- Dr John Christopher Daley – For significant service to public policy development, and to the community.
- The Honourable Cheryl May Davenport – For significant service to the Parliament of Western Australia, and to the community.
- Professor Christopher Bernard Del Mar – For significant service to tertiary education, to health and medical research, and to professional bodies.
- Professor Amalia Di Iorio – For significant service to tertiary education, to skills development, and to women.
- Ronald Frank Donnellan – For significant service to children, to cycling, and to the community of Townsville.
- Roger Thomas Dooley – For significant service to community health, to psychology, and to professional societies.
- Dr Trevor Dowdell – For significant service to artistic gymnastics through a range of roles.
- Rose Downer – For significant service to the visual and performing arts as a patron and supporter.
- Dr David Durrheim – For significant service to public health medicine, and to international health.
- Katherine Louise Eastman – For significant service to the law, to human rights, and to professional organisations.
- Harriet Claire Elvin – For significant service to arts administration in the Australian Capital Territory and to the community.
- Angela Emslie – For significant service to the finance and superannuation sectors, and to suicide prevention.
- Robert Henry Estcourt – For significant service to the financial management sector.
- Dr Bronwyn Joy Evans – For significant service to engineering, to standards, and to medical technology.
- Dr Kenneth William Evans – For significant service to education, to independent schools, and to public administration.
- Judi Farr – For significant service to the performing arts as an actor.
- Matthew James Fehon – For significant service to the community through a range of roles.
- Dr Jennifer Fitzgerald – For significant service to people with disability through leadership and advocacy roles.
- Rodney Milton Fitzroy – For significant service to healthcare, to racing, and to the commercial real estate sector.
- Rodney Thomas Forrester – For significant service to the community of the Sunshine Coast.
- Nancy Suzanne Fox – For significant service to the financial and banking sector, and to women in business.
- Emeritus Professor Susan Evelyn Fraser – For significant service to tertiary education, and to health and medical organisations.
- Marion Fulker – For significant service to urban planning and infrastructure development.
- Anne Maree Gardiner – For significant service to lifesaving organisations through a range of roles.
- Michael Arthur Gay – For significant service to industrial relations, and to international labour organisations.
- William Gibbins – For significant service to horse racing, and to people with disability.
- David Ian Gibbs – For significant service to the community, and to the chartered accounting profession.
- Brian John Gilbertson – For significant service to festivals and events in South Australia, to opera, and to voice education.
- Dr Peter Nicholas Gilchrist – For significant service to psychiatry, particularly to people with weight disorders.
- Rabbi Yaakov Glasman – For significant service to Judaism and interfaith dialogue, to rabbinical bodies, and to the community.
- Louise Mary Gourlay, OAM – For significant service to the community through charitable initiatives.
- Ian Leslie Gray – For significant service to the law, and to Indigenous justice.
- Robert John Gregory – For significant service to the community of South Australia.
- Professor Gilles Guillemin – For significant service to science education, to Motor Neurone Disease research, and to sport.
- Professor Narelle Lorraine Haines – For significant service to the road transport industry, and to accident research.
- Dr Jane Lavinia Halliday – For significant service to medicine, and to reproductive epidemiology.
- Robert James Hamilton – For significant service to the property development sector, and to urban renewal.
- Judge Felicity Pia Hampel – For significant service to the judiciary, to legal organisations, and to women.
- Helen Hardcastle – For significant service to corporate governance and leadership organisations.
- John Robert Hardie – For significant service to science education, and to professional societies.
- Dr Elizabeth Harris – For significant service to equity in healthcare, to research, and to social work.
- Jill Margaret Healey – For significant service to education through leadership and advisory roles.
- Brendan Matthew Heenan – For significant service to the tourism industry in central Australia.
- Christopher Hemsworth – For significant service to the performing arts, and to charitable organisations.
- Emeritus Professor Beryl Lilian Hesketh – For significant service to STEM education, and to organisational psychology.
- James Hewish – For significant service to short track speed skating through a range of roles.
- George Maurice Hoad – For significant service to the residential horticulture industry, and to the community.
- Kevin John Holtom – For significant service to open water swimming, and to professional organisations.
- Robert Malcolm Hook – For significant service to the community of Ballarat.
- Professor Rosemary Sylvia Horne – For significant service to paediatric medicine, and to infant mortality prevention.
- Rob Justin Hulls – For significant service to the people and Parliament of Victoria, and to the law.
- Peter George Irwin – For significant service to tertiary education, to geography, and to the community of Newcastle.
- Professor Claire Louise Jackson – For significant service to primary health reform, and to general practice medicine.
- Dr John Samuel Jell – For significant service to environmental science education, and to geological societies.
- Wendy Johnson – For significant service to secondary education in South Australia.
- Dr Belinda (Bidda) Sumner Jones – For significant service to animal welfare science and advocacy.
- David Fletcher Jones – For significant service to the museums and galleries sector, and to the community.
- Dr Nigel Ronald Jones – For significant service to neurosurgical medicine, and to medical societies.
- Charles Justin – For significant service to the museums sector, to arts administration, and to architecture.
- Epaminondas Katsalidis – For significant service to architecture, and to sustainable construction innovations.
- Timothy John Keeler – For significant service to the community through a range of roles, and to education.
- Charlie King, OAM – For significant service to the Indigenous community of the Northern Territory.
- Dr Geoffrey Macdonald Knight – For significant service to professional dental associations, and to the community.
- Professor Sabina Margaret Knight – For significant service to rural and remote health, nursing and education.
- John George Kotzas – For significant service to the performing arts as an administrator and artistic director.
- Wayne Noel Kratzmann – For significant service to the visual and performing arts, and to education.
- Letitia Lancaster – For significant service to oncology nursing, and to professional societies.
- The Reverend Dr Cecilie Marion Lander – For significant service to neurological medicine, and to the Anglican Church of Australia.
- The Reverend Dr Mervyn Meredith Lander – For significant service to paediatric medicine, and to the Anglican Church of Australia.
- Anna Oi Chan Lao – For significant service to badminton, and to the multicultural community.
- Harvey Douglas Lister – For significant service to the arts, tourism, sport, and to the venue management and events industries.
- Dr Andrew Brantley Lu, OAM – For significant service to the visual and performing arts, to the law, and to legal education.
- Dr Heather Gwen Mack – For significant service to ophthalmology, particularly to professional colleges.
- Professor Alan Mackay-Sim – For significant service to tertiary education, and to biomedical science.
- The Reverend John Warrenne Maddern, RFD – For significant service to the Uniting Church in Australia, and to the community.
- Emeritus Professor Toni Magdalena Makkai – For significant service to tertiary education, and to public administration.
- Professor Neil Bressay Manson – For significant service to tertiary education, particularly to physics.
- The late Loisette Matilda Marsh – For significant service to marine science and zoology.
- Professor Frank Louis Mastaglia – For significant service to neuromuscular disease, and to professional associations.
- Helen Maxwell-Wright – For significant service to child welfare, to diabetes research, and to the community.
- Maree Anne McCabe – For significant service to people living with Alzheimer's and Dementia, and to the aged care sector.
- Fiona McCormack – For significant service to victims of crime, and to the prevention of family violence.
- Christine Frances McLoughlin – For significant service to business, to the not-for-profit sector, and to women.
- Associate Professor Faye Beverley McMillan – For significant service to Indigenous mental health, and to tertiary education.
- Peter Godfrey McMullin – For significant service to business, to the law, and to the community.
- Dr Timothy Francis McNamara – For significant service to tertiary education, and to applied linguistics.
- Peter Andrea McPhee – For significant service to the community through a range of organisations.
- Dr Erica McWilliam – For significant service to education, and to pedagogy and gender equity.
- Anthony Peter Melville – For significant service to corporate and government communications.
- Dr Jane Melville – For significant service to herpetological research, and to the museums sector.
- Dr Bryan Christopher Mendelson – For significant service to aesthetic plastic surgery, and to medical societies.
- Ann Elizabeth Miller – For significant service to the community through charitable initiatives.
- Mark Justin Miller – For significant service to visual and performing arts administration.
- Kathryn Ann Mitchell – For significant service to urban planning, and to professional associations.
- Lolita Veronica Mohyla – For significant service to architecture, and to construction law.
- Scott Norman Monaghan – For significant service to Indigenous health, and to medical research.
- The Honourable Murray Scott Montgomery – For significant service to the Parliament of Western Australia, and to the community.
- Robyn Barbara Moore – For significant service to charitable organisations, and to the performing arts.
- Danny William Murphy – For significant service to urban development, and to the community.
- Dr Keith Louis Mutimer – For significant service to plastic surgery, and to the international community.
- Professor Debra Faye Nestel – For significant service to medical education through simulated teaching methods.
- Dr Patrice Newell – For significant service to the environment, and to sustainable farming practices.
- Thuat Van Nguyen, OAM – For significant service to the multicultural community of New South Wales, and to youth.
- Vivienne Nguyen – For significant service to the multicultural community of Victoria.
- His Honour Kerry John O'Brien – For significant service to the law, and to the judiciary in Queensland.
- Dr Barry Stephen O'Loughlin – For significant service to medicine, and to medical administration.
- Julie Oberin – For significant service to women and children experiencing family violence.
- Janette Mary Owen – For significant service to the Indigenous community through dental health initiatives.
- Andrew Papadopoulos – For significant service to motorsport, and to driver safety and education.
- Shelley Jane Penn – For significant service to architecture and design in the public realm, and to professional institutes.
- Larry Clifton Perkins – For significant service to motorsport as a touring car driver and team owner.
- Anthony John Phillips – For significant service to optometry, and to professional optical societies.
- Craig Phillips – For significant service to high profile sporting organisations through executive roles.
- The Honourable David James Porter – For significant service to the law, and to the judiciary, in Tasmania.
- Leah Maree Purcell – For significant service to the performing arts, to First Nations youth and culture, and to women.
- Mavis Randle – For significant service to hockey, and to the community.
- Jan Rice – For significant service to nursing, to wound care, and to education.
- Professor Robyn Lesley Richmond – For significant service to tertiary medical education, and to public health.
- Christopher Michael Rigby – For significant service to health and aged care organisations.
- Emeritus Professor Ian Douglas Riley – For significant service to tertiary medical education, notably to tropical health.
- John Charles Risby – For significant service to the steelmaking industry, and to the community of Newcastle.
- Vivienne Ritchie – For significant service to the Anglican Church of Australia, and to the community.
- Vicki Joan Roach – For significant service to neuroscience nursing, and to professional federations.
- Pamela Jean Robinson, OAM – For significant service to conservation and the environment, and to the community.
- Professor Ute Roessner – For significant service to tertiary education, particularly to the biosciences.
- Glenyys Dorothy Romanes – For significant service to the Parliament of Victoria, and to the community.
- Coral Ross – For significant service to local government, and to gender equality.
- Elana Rubin – For significant service to corporate governance, and to the community.
- Dr Elizabeth Anne Rushen – For significant service to community history and heritage preservation.
- Dr Sarah Anne Ryan – For significant service to the environment, to education, and to the community.
- Colin Saltmere – For significant service to the Indigenous communities of North West Queensland.
- Emeritus Professor Barbara Jean Santich – For significant service to tertiary education, to gastronomy, food culture and history.
- Elizabeth Anne Scarce – For significant service to the community of South Australia through a range of roles.
- Clive Ian Scott – For significant service to the hotel accommodation industry, and to the arts.
- The late Raymond Walter Scott – For significant service to the road transport industry, and to the community.
- Dr Helen Scott-Orr, PSM – For significant service to public administration, to biosecurity, and to veterinary science.
- Gregory Peter Shand – For significant service to the Jewish community, and to charitable initiatives.
- Clinical Associate Professor Gary Fred Sholler – For significant service to paediatric medicine, and to tertiary medical education.
- Julie Shuttleworth – For significant service to the minerals and mining sector.
- Vallence Gary Simonds – For significant service to the building and construction industry, and to charitable initiatives.
- Graeme William Sinclair – For significant service to accountancy, to business, and to the not-for-profit sector.
- Craig John Smith-Gander – For significant service to surf lifesaving, to transport logistics, and to the community.
- Trent John Smyth – For significant service to international relations, to motorsport, and to business.
- Dr Gillian Ann Sparkes – For significant service to environmental sustainability, and to public administration.
- Dr Victor Roy Squires – For significant service to the environment, notably to the ecology of rangelands.
- Dr Charles John Steadman – For significant service to tertiary medical education, and to gastroenterology.
- The Honourable Sydney James Stirling – For significant service to the Legislative Assembly of the Northern Territory, and to the community.
- Thomas Bernard Stodulka – For significant service to the law, and to mediation and dispute resolution.
- Dr Julie Claudia Stone – For significant service to child mental health, and to psychiatry.
- Ricky Stuart – For significant service to rugby league, and to the community.
- Karim Sumar – For significant service to the Ismaili community, and to the convenience retail industry.
- Ricci Edith Swart – For significant service to the media and film industries, and to the community.
- Robert William Talbott, OAM – For significant service to the community through a range of roles.
- Dr Albert Ee San Tan – For significant service to tertiary dental education, and to periodontics.
- Professor Tele Tan – For significant service to information and communication technology, and to people on the autism spectrum.
- Colin Tate – For significant service to the community through charitable initiatives.
- Professor Helena Teede – For significant service to medical education and research, to endocrinology, and to women’s health.
- James Frederick Thane – For significant service to the performing arts as a theatrical producer and advisor.
- Anthony Charles Thomas – For significant service to education, particularly to children with special needs.
- Professor Emeritus Doreen Anne Thomas – For significant service to tertiary engineering education and research, and to women.
- Dr Geoffrey Laughton Thompson – For significant service to sports medicine, and to Paralympic athletes.
- Emeritus Professor James Toouli – For significant service to tertiary medical education, notably to gastroenterology.
- Dr Neil Clifford Turner – For significant service to agricultural and environmental science, and to education.
- Dr Linette Veitch – For significant service to nurse education, and to international health programs.
- Charlotte Vidor – For significant service to the multicultural community, to tourism, and to urban planning.
- Professor Beverley Janine Vollenhoven – For significant service to tertiary medical education, to obstetrics and gynaecology.
- Amanda (Mandy) Joy Walker – For significant service to film as a cinematographer, and to professional societies.
- Joan Warhurst – For significant service to education, and to research and curriculum development.
- Barry John Watchorn – For significant service to the superannuation sector through a range of roles.
- Maxine Joy Weber – For significant service to children, particularly to infant mortality prevention.
- Dr Tracy Gillian Westerman – For significant service to the Indigenous community in mental health and suicide prevention.
- Rhonda Joyce Weston – For significant service to aged persons' education, and to the community of Toowoomba.
- Dr Betsy Williams – For significant service to international health, and to medicine as a general practitioner.
- Gina Williams – For significant service to the performing arts, to Indigenous music, and to media.
- Dr George Wilson – For significant service to wildlife conservation, to veterinary science, and to the community.
- Susan Dorothy Woodward – For significant service to the not-for-profit sector, to fundraising, and to the law.
- Associate Professor Edwina Jane Wright – For significant service to medicine and research, notably for people living with HIV/AIDS.
- Jeremy Maughan Wright – For significant service to the not-for-profit sector, and to the performing arts.
- Robert David Yallop – For significant service to international humanitarian aid organisations.
- Dr Judith Nancy Yates – For significant service to housing and economic research, and to education.
- Keith Robert Yates – For significant service to the minerals and mining sector, and to the community.
- Professor Peter Shane Yu – For significant service to the community, particularly to Indigenous cultural and political organisations.
- Leanne Zalapa – For significant service to the Prince of Wales Hospital Foundation, and to health education.
- Dr Richard Maxwell Zuber – For significant service to veterinary science, to professional colleges, and to education.

==== Military Division ====
Navy

- Commodore Timothy Alan Brown, RAN – For exceptional service to the Royal Australian Navy, principally in leading submarine capability development.
- Rear Admiral Jennifer Ruth Firman, RAN – For exceptional performance of duty in the field of military medicine.
- Rear Admiral Mark Davenport Hill, CSC, RAN – For exceptional service as the Commander Joint Task Force 633 on Operation Accordion from June 2019 to January 2020.

Army

- Brigadier Douglas Watson Laidlaw, CSC – For exceptional service as the Commander 4th Brigade and Commander Joint Task Force 646 during Operation BUSHFIRE ASSIST 2019-2020.
- Lieutenant Colonel Peta Mantel – For exceptional service to the Australian Defence Force in the fields of medical intelligence, health leadership, and epidemiology and disease surveillance.
- Brigadier David John Thomae – For exceptional service as Adjutant General - Army, Commander 11 Brigade and Commander Joint Task Group 629.3.

Air Force

- Air Vice-Marshal Alan Gregory Clements, CSC – For exceptional service to the Australian Defence Force in delivering the 2013 Force Structure Review, and in international engagement as Head of the Australian Defence Staff, Washington.
- Warrant Officer Scott Anthony Doring – For exceptional service to the Australian Defence Force in air surveillance operations and personnel capability development.
- Group Captain Edward Allan Eather – For exceptional performance of duty to the Australian Defence Force in legal services.
- Air Commodore Damien Raymond Keddie – For exceptional service to the Australian Defence Force in combat aircraft acquisition and sustainment, and organisational capability development.
- Warrant Officer Ricki Paul Kiely – For exceptional service in combat aircraft sustainment, Defence Aviation Safety Regulations development and implementation, and maintenance management in the Royal Australian Air Force.
- Group Captain Martin Norman Nussio – For exceptional service to the Australian Defence Force in capability acquisition and sustainment.
- Air Commodore Dianne Marie Turton – For exceptional service to the Australian Defence Force in the field of intelligence.
- Group Captain Paul James Willmot, CSC – For exceptional service in aviation workforce sustainment for the Australian Defence Force.

==== Honorary ====
- Carol Berg – For significant service to mental health, to social justice, and to the arts.
- Karen Lorraine Lindley – For significant service to social welfare initiatives, and to the jewellery industry.

=== Medal of the Order of Australia (OAM) ===
==== General Division ====
- Barry Lewis Abley – For service to the community of Geelong.
- Margaret Adams – For service to the community of Boroondara.
- The late Nicholas Andrew Agocs – For service to the multicultural community of Western Australia.
- Maria Alexiadis – For service to karate.
- Dr Frank Peter Alford – For service to endocrinology.
- Associate Professor Kevin Patrick Alford – For service to medicine as a cardiologist.
- Roger Blair Allan – For service to primary education, and to disability sports.
- Dr Susie Janet Allanson – For service to community health as a psychologist.
- Adele Marion Allen – For service to the community through the church.
- Belinda Helen Allen – For service to youth through Girl Guides.
- George Amarandos – For service to the Greek community of Queensland.
- Dr Antoinette Catherine Anazodo – For service to medical research.
- Julia Jane Armstrong – For service to the performing arts through theatre support roles.
- Prudence Margaret Armstrong – For service to the community of Moss Vale.
- Janice Edyth Armstrong-Conn – For service to the community through a range of organisations.
- Carmel Arthur – For service to the law.
- Clinical Professor Eugene Athan – For service to infectious diseases medicine.
- Wendy Anne Baarda – For service to the Indigenous community of Yuendumu.
- Cornelia Babbage – For service to the multicultural community of the Gold Coast.
- Hadyn Dennis Bailey – For service to the community of North West Victoria.
- Ian Humprey Bailey – For service to people with disability through sport.
- Dr Louise Baker – For service to rural and remote medicine.
- Associate Professor Ramesh Balasubramaniam – For service to dentistry.
- Dr Peter John Baquie – For service to sports medicine.
- Les Barclay – For service to swimming.
- Shirley Lillian Bare – For service to community health.
- Marie Margaret Barns – For service to music.
- Wendy Joan Barrett – For service to music.
- Jennifer Wendy Barry – For service to the community of Gladstone.
- Adrian Robert Bartak – For service to music.
- Lorraine Helen Bartel – For service to the community of Moree.
- Christopher William Bastian – For service to youth.
- Barbara Bates – For service to children.
- The Reverend Colin Richard Baxter – For service to the Uniting Church in Australia, and to the community.
- The late Ethel Emily Baxter – For service to the Indigenous community of Queanbeyan.
- Kevin George Beeck – For service to local government, and to the community of Albany.
- Emeritus Professor Diane Robin Bell – For service to literature.
- Jean Isabel Bennett – For service to the community of Canberra.
- Wing Commander Peter John Bennetts (Retd) – For service to veterans and their families.
- Manyang Berberi – For service to the South Sudanese community of Victoria.
- Mark Beretta – For service to the community through charitable organisations.
- Thelma May Bevilaqua – For service to the community through a range of roles.
- Petras Bielskis – For service to the Lithuanian community of South Australia.
- Monika Biernacki – For service to animal welfare.
- Jonathan Biggins – For service to the performing arts through theatre.
- Sarnia Ann Birch – For service to veterans and their families.
- Catherine Anne Birkett – For service to the community of the Goulburn Valley.
- Kenneth John Birkett – For service to the community of the Goulburn Valley.
- Angela Jane Bishop – For service to entertainment journalism.
- Regula Christine Black – For service to veterans and their families.
- Jill Blackman – For service to the community of Gilgandra.
- The Reverend Dr Merryl Lois Blair – For service to ecumenical and interfaith organisations.
- Ruth Ann Blanch – For service to the community of Armidale.
- Richard Kent Bligh – For service to the community of the Darling Downs.
- Beny Aterdit Bol – For service to youth.
- Carol Bonamy – For service to the community of the Lismore region.
- Lawrence Frederick Bond – For service to surf lifesaving.
- Stephanie Bortkevitch – For service to netball.
- Henry Granger Boston – For service to the arts.
- Nancy Clare Boyling – For service to the community through charitable organisations.
- Dawson Stanley Bradford – For service to the livestock industry.
- Dr James Bradley – For service to literature as a writer.
- Ann Brett – For service to the Royal Life Saving Society.
- Lily Brett – For service to literature as a writer.
- Nada Brissenden – For service to music.
- Dr Rosemary Helen Brooks – For service to tertiary education.
- Ken Broomhead – For service to the aviation industry.
- Jacki Joantares Brown – For service to people with disability.
- Michael Brown – For service to rugby union.
- Sr Deirdre Patrice Browne – For service to the community as a religious sister, and through music, education and the liturgical arts.
- Greg Allan Bruce – For service to local government, and to the community of Townsville.
- Jennifer Florence Brukner – For service to the community through charitable organisations.
- Dr Betsy Buchanan – For service to the community through social welfare organisations.
- Yen Bui – For service to the Vietnamese community of Victoria.
- Donald Raymond Burge – For service to the community through a range of roles.
- Tony William Burns – For service to people with disability.
- Margaret Bush – For service to the community through animal clubs.
- Mark Anthony Byatt – For service to local government, to regional development, and to the community of Hume.
- Dr Geoffrey Charles Byrne – For service to paediatric endocrinology.
- Colin Anthony Cala – For service to local government, and to the community of South Perth.
- The late John Robert Caldon – For service to business through media content distribution.
- Barbara Mary Callaghan – For service to music.
- Prudence Marilyn Campbell – For service to the community of Birregurra.
- Susan Campbell – For service to youth through Guides.
- Alan Jack Carter – For service to children with disability, and to the community.
- Felicity Jane Carter – For service to the community of the Great Lakes region.
- Stephen Michael Cartwright – For service to business administration.
- Derrick Casey – For service to tertiary education.
- Lieutenant Colonel Stephen Garnet Chamarette (Retd) – For service to veterans.
- The late Mary Julie Chandler – For service to the community of Red Cliffs.
- Kaye Noelene Chapman – For service to the community of Cowra.
- Roberta Mary Chapman – For service to primary education.
- Reginald James Chard – For service to military history, and to veterans.
- Heather Rose Chester – For service to environmental conservation.
- Dr Anthony Chun Ming Cheung – For service to the community through a range of organisations.
- Colin Chirgwin – For service to youth.
- Heather Christensen – For service to the community of Beenleigh.
- Karen Christensen – For service to the community of Wandong.
- William Ewart Church – For service to the community of Yarrawonga.
- Giuseppe Rocco Cinanni – For service to the community through a range of roles.
- Kenneth Gary Clark – For service to surf lifesaving, and to the community.
- Arthur Coghlan – For service to the performing arts as a magician and escapologist.
- Dean Joel Cohen – For service to people with disability, and to the Jewish community.
- The Reverend Dr James Anthony Collins – For service to the Anglican Church of Australia.
- Charles Graham Colman – For service to music.
- Thomas Robin Conboy – For service to the community of Mount Gambier.
- The late Allan Stuart Connolly – For service to cricket.
- Judith Mary Connors – For service to the creative arts, particularly as a tatter and lace maker.
- Geoff Coombes – For service to the community through charitable organisations.
- Anne Martin Cooper – For service to osteopathy.
- Jan Elizabeth Cooper – For service to Australian rules football.
- Stephen Julian Cordell – For service to the Jewish community.
- Dr Craig Cormick – For service to science, and to the community.
- Dr Hugh James Cornell – For service to biochemical research, and to tertiary education.
- Graham George Corney – For service to education governance.
- Barry David Costa – For service to rugby league.
- Dr Costas Costa – For service to medicine as a general practitioner.
- Lindsay Charles Cox – For service to community history.
- Peter John Cox – For service to rugby league.
- Richard John Cox – For service to the community of the Mornington Peninsula.
- Virginia Hunter Cox – For service to librarianship.
- The late Judith Lorraine Crabtree – For service to primary education.
- Andrew Hugh Craig – For service to veterans and their families.
- Jeffrey James Cree AFSM – For service to the community through emergency response organisations.
- Elizabeth Ann Creek – For service to the beef cattle industry.
- Jeanette Lydia Crew – For service to Indigenous culture, and to conservation.
- Trevor James Cross – For service to the community through charitable organisations.
- Wendy Cross – For service to the community through charitable organisations.
- The late Vera Crvenkovic – For service to the Croatian community.
- Nerida Cullen – For service to the community of Goulburn.
- Alan Erskine Cummins – For service to caving.
- Pamela Elizabeth Cupper – For service to education, and to the preservation of military history.
- Jennifer Margaret Curnow – For service to the community through a range of roles.
- Kevin John Curran – For service to Australian rules football.
- John Handel Cutler – For service to the fashion industry.
- David Joseph Czerkies – For service to the community through St John Ambulance.
- Denise Marilyn Davies – For service to youth through Scouts.
- Patricia Margaret Daw – For service to badminton.
- Gary Francis Dawson – For service to Balkan and Hungarian folk arts.
- Dr Teresa De Fazio – For service to tertiary education.
- Peter Charles De Rauch – For service to community health, and to Australian rules football.
- Fouad Deiri – For service to the Lebanese community of Australia.
- Dr Stephen Anthony Della-Fiorentina – For service to oncology.
- Christopher Stanley Dempsey – For service to cricket.
- Julie Ann Dempsey – For service to community mental health.
- Betty Merle Denning – For service to the community of Pittsworth.
- The late Matthew William Deveson – For service to the community of Narooma.
- Kenneth Richard Dickson – For service to the community through emergency response organisations.
- Dr Amanda Jane Dines – For service to medicine.
- Margaret Lynne Docking – For service to the international community through health programs.
- Reginald Dodd – For service to the Indigenous community of Marree.
- William Joseph Doherty – For service to Australian rules football.
- Leonie Jane Donovan – For service to community history.
- John De Cruz Douglas – For service to veterans.
- Sandra Rose Doumany – For service to the community of the Gold Coast.
- Pastor Dale Dowler – For service to the community of the Sunshine Coast.
- Ian Francis Doyle – For service to journalism, and to the community.
- Steven Michael Drinkwater – For service to dog agility sports.
- Dr Jan Dudley – For service to obstetrics and gynaecology.
- Evan Duke – For service to the community of Bundaberg.
- Trevor Harold Duniam – For service to the community of Wynyard.
- Mark Wayne Durdin – For service to people who are deaf or hard of hearing.
- Katherine Susan Eccles – For service to conservation and the environment.
- Ian Roland Eckersley – For service to primary industry.
- Brian Stewart Edward, APM – For service to the community of Geelong.
- The late Pierce David Edwards – For service to the communities of Quilpie and South West Queensland.
- Gary Edwin – For service to golf.
- Adrian Francis Elder – For service to the community of Bridgetown.
- Colin James Elliott – For service to the community of Campbelltown.
- William Edwin Ellis – For service to harness racing.
- The late Donald Phillip Ellison – For service to horticulture.
- Belal Elmowy – For service to taekwondo, and to the community.
- Philip Leslie Emery – For service to the community of Greater Geelong.
- Mx Misty Farquhar – For service to the LGBTQI community.
- Denis William Farrar – For service to the law.
- Lieutenant Commander Leo Francis Farrelly (Retd) – For service to youth, and to the community.
- Joseph Vincent Farrugia – For service to the superannuation sector.
- Philip Morris Feinstein – For service to refugees.
- The late Ronald Douglas Fenton – For service to the community through mental health advocacy roles.
- Kevin Fergusson – For service to triathlon.
- Robert John Finn – For service to the community of Goolwa.
- John Andrew Ford – For service to the community of Port Adelaide.
- Kerrie Ann Ford – For service to community history.
- Lynda Ford – For service to the multicultural community of Victoria.
- William Munro Ford – For service to the community through social welfare organisations.
- Abigail Margaret Forsyth – For service to sustainable design.
- Dr Scott Comber Fortey – For service to medicine as an anaesthetist.
- Vincenzo Foti – For service to the pyrotechnic industry, and to the community.
- Vanessa A Fowler – For service to the community through social welfare organisations.
- Rodney Alleric Fraser – For service to the community through a range of organisations.
- Susan Joy Fraser – For service to financial planning and counselling.
- Dr Clifford Brodie Frith – For service to conservation and the environment.
- Dr Dawn Whyatt Frith – For service to conservation and the environment.
- Malaemie Patricia Fruean – For service to the Pacific communities of New South Wales.
- Lyn Fuller – For service to music.
- Fiona Gardner – For service to the community through social welfare organisations.
- Clinical Professor Peter Colin Gates – For service to neurology.
- Edgar James Gaunt – For service to the communities of Camden and Cobbitty.
- Brian Kevin Gee – For service to surf lifesaving, and to junior rugby league.
- John Gibson – For service to the community of North West Tasmania.
- Emma Harriet Gierschick – For service to the community, and to reflexology.
- Neville James Gilbertson – For service to the community of Mount Gambier.
- Francoise Andree Gilroy – For service to the community of North Sydney.
- Joan Elizabeth Glen – For service to music.
- Katrina Gliddon – For service to the international community of Cambodia.
- Richard Roy Gloede – For service to Australian rules football.
- Rebecca Anne Goddard – For service to Australian rules football, and to women in sport.
- Dr Stacy Kellan Goergen – For service to radiology.
- Christine Joan Goodfellow – For service to veterans and their families.
- David Goodrich – For service to the community, and to the defence sector.
- Dr Brian Richard Gordon – For service to the community through a range of roles.
- Penelope Ruth Gordon – For service to the community through social welfare organisations.
- Dr Peter Rob Gordon – For service to disaster recovery as a psychologist.
- Elizabeth Ann Gosper – For service to people with disability through sport.
- Clare Grant – For service to the performing arts through administrative roles.
- Norma Helen Grant – For service to education.
- Dr Peter Treacy Grant – For service to gynaecological oncology.
- Associate Professor Kathleen Mary Gray – For service to medicine through digital health education.
- Oriel Green – For service to the Indigenous community of Western Australia.
- Professor Brin Felix Grenyer – For service to psychology.
- Dick Martin Guit – For service to the building and construction industry.
- Allan John Guthrie – For service to the community through emergency response organisations.
- Andrew Frank Guy – For service to the community through a range of organisations.
- Russell Martin Haines – For service to community history.
- The Reverend Pam Halbert – For service to the Anglican Church of Australia, and to the community of Western Australia.
- Allen Thomas Hall – For service to the community of Wandong.
- Graeme Lloyd Hall – For service to the community of Marion.
- Deborah Halpern – For service to the arts.
- Pieternella Wilhelmina Haly – For service to the community of Rosewood.
- Paul William Hammat – For service to the community through pastoral care.
- Brian Edward Hanley – For service to secondary education.
- Bashar Hanna – For service to multiculturalism and refugee support in Western Sydney.
- Dr David Linley Hare – For service to cardiology.
- Margaret Edwina Hargans – For service to the community of Bathurst.
- Sandra May Haring – For service to the community of Broken Hill.
- David Russell Harris – For service to the community through charitable organisations.
- Deborah Mary Harrison – For service to the community through charitable initiatives.
- John Richard Harry – For service to the community, to rowing, and to the legal profession.
- Lincoln John Hart – For service to the tourism industry.
- Dr Anthony S Hasham – For service to business, and to the Australian-Lebanese community.
- Medy Hassan – For service to the building and construction industry.
- Elizabeth Mary Hawthorne – For service to the international community of East Zambia.
- Patricia Mary Hawthorne – For service to the community of St Lucia.
- Bryan Kenneth Hearn – For service to the community of South Australia, and to football.
- Diane Claire Heaton – For service to dance.
- Owen Leigh Hegarty – For service to the minerals and mining sector.
- Leanne Heywood – For service to business through a range of organisations.
- Matthew Thomas Hickey – For service to music, and to the law.
- Joplin Higgins – For service to the law.
- Rita Hillier – For service to the community through the Anglican Church of Australia.
- Betty Pamela Hislop – For service to darts.
- Michael Macpherson Hocking – For service to sailing.
- John Clelland Hocknull – For service to the community through a range of roles.
- Rosavilla Hoffmann – For service to the community through charitable organisations.
- Dr David Hobson Hooke – For service to nephrology, and to aviation medicine.
- Alistair Geoffrey Horne – For service to youth through Scouts.
- Ngatuaine Hosking – For service to the multicultural community of Victoria.
- Sister Adele Howard – For service to the Catholic Church of Australia, and to the community.
- Christine Anne Howe – For service to secondary education.
- Keran Elizabeth Howe – For service to people with disability.
- Robert Howe – For service to the community through a range of roles.
- George Hurley – For service to the community of the Sutherland Shire, and to football.
- Graeme Norval Hyde – For service to conservation, particularly through aviculture.
- Anthony John Irvine – For service to local government, and to the communities of the Eyre Peninsula.
- Barry Leonard Irving – For service to the community of Rosebud-Rye.
- Phillip Isaacs – For service to the community through a range of roles.
- Professor Felice Jacka – For service to nutritional psychiatry research.
- Ronald Edwin Jackson – For service to the community of Cessnock.
- John Jesse James – For service to rowing.
- Alexander Robert Johnson – For service to golf, and to the community.
- Barbara Joyce Johnson – For service to the community of Naracoorte.
- Sam Craig Johnson – For service to local government, and to the community.
- Susan Dianne Johnson – For service to the community, and to tenpin bowling.
- Nathan Johnston – For service to people with disability through sport.
- Pete Leslie Johnston – For service to veterans.
- Janet Lesley Jones – For service to surf lifesaving, and to the community.
- Oscar Edwin Joppich – For service to the Lutheran church, and to the community.
- Alan William Joyce – For service to surf lifesaving, and to the community.
- Janet Jukes – For service to the community through LGBTIQ advocacy and social welfare organisations.
- Associate Professor Sarah Jane Kelly – For service to tertiary education, and to sports administration.
- Richard Edward Kenny – For service to rifle and pistol shooting, and to veterans.
- Graham Barry Kent – For service to the community of Devonport, and to yachting.
- Edward Kerr – For service to the community through charitable organisations.
- Richard Ian Kew – For service to business, and the community.
- Dr Edith Khangure – For service to community history.
- Lynne Killeen – For service to the Indigenous community, and to women.
- Peter John Kilmurray – For service to surf lifesaving.
- Alison Kincaid – For service to nursing.
- Hazel Monica King – For service to horticulture, and to community history.
- Jeffrey Langdon King – For service to conservation.
- Rosanne Phyllis (Rosie) King – For service to sports administration.
- Roy Kirkby – For service to korfball.
- Kevin John Kleemann – For service to the community of the Adelaide Hills.
- Cornelis Gerardus Klep – For service to youth through Scouts.
- Nevil Parish Knell – For service to the community through social welfare organisations.
- Victor Gregory Knowles – For service to music, and to the community of Mudgeeraba.
- Dr Igor Konstantinov – For service to medicine as a cardiothoracic surgeon.
- Harold George Kratz – For service to rowing.
- The late Ricardo Erwin Krauskopf – For service to the community through a range of roles.
- Eduvard Krncevic – For service to football.
- Dr Santosh Kumar – For service to the Indian community of Victoria.
- Brian John Ladd – For service to the public art galleries sector.
- Janet Patricia Lambert – For service to the community of Vacy.
- Sandra Dawn Lambkin – For service to veterans and their families.
- Dr John Scott Langrehr – For service to tertiary education.
- Lawrence O'Hara Larmer – For service to the community through a range of roles.
- Dr Andrew Denis Lawrence – For service to the chiropractic profession.
- Glenn Lazarus – For service to rugby league.
- Jennifer Duggan Leaper – For service to aged welfare.
- Dr Richard John Leaper – For service to aged welfare.
- John William Elliott Leddy – For service to the community, and to engineering.
- John Albert Lee – For service to the community through social welfare organisations.
- Alexander McGown Lennox – For service to veterans and their families.
- Dr Alexander Douglas Levendel – For service to cardiology and nuclear medicine.
- Dr Susan Patricia Lever – For service to literature.
- Dr Felicity-Ann Lewis – For service to local government, and to the community of Marion.
- Jacqueline Vanessa Liddiard – For service to veterans and their families.
- Ronald Keith Lindenberg – For service to rugby league.
- Dr Rimas Liubinas – For service to medicine as a general practitioner.
- Dr Robert Hugh Llewellyn-Jones – For service to psychiatry, and to children with developmental disability.
- Adam Ka-Ho Lo – For service to mental health, and to the multicultural community of Queensland.
- Judith Ann Loffel – For service to country music.
- Michael Long – For service to Australian rules football, and to the Indigenous community.
- The late William Rainsford Loughnan – For service to agriculture, and to the law.
- Ronald Louis – For service to the financial sector, and to the community.
- Richard Geoffrey Love – For service to the community through a range of roles.
- Graham Frederick Lovell – For service to the community of Epping.
- Keith Mayfield Lovelock – For service to the community through emergency response organisations.
- Martin Stephen Lowe – For service to veterans.
- Paul Francis Lucas – For service to primary education.
- Harry Lynas – For service to community history.
- Kevin John Lynch – For service to the community of Newcastle.
- Robyn Margaret MacIntosh – For service to the community of Sydney.
- Gordon Donald Mackenzie – For service to tertiary education.
- Helen Madden – For service to the performing arts as an artistic director and creative producer.
- Professor Dianna Josephine Magliano – For service to epidemiology, and to tertiary education.
- Frances Ann Maguire – For service to the community through social welfare organisations.
- Patrick Joseph Maher – For service to people with disability.
- Marie Theresa Mahon – For service to dance as a teacher.
- Christopher Gerard Mahony – For service to rugby league.
- Graham Maifredi – For service to white water rafting.
- Estelle Flora Malseed – For service to community health.
- Alan Philip James Manly – For service to tertiary education.
- Felicity Marlowe – For service to the community through social welfare organisations.
- Izydor Marmur – For service to the Jewish community.
- Charles Henry Martin – For service to community history.
- Marko Peter Martinovich – For service to public administration.
- Dr Anthony Linton Marxsen – For service to engineering.
- Thomas Bernard Massam – For service to the real estate industry.
- Leslie George Mather – For service to community health.
- Bruno Francois Maurel – For service to the community through charitable initiatives.
- John Frederick McCaffrey – For service to people with disability.
- Dorothy Kate McConkey – For service to youth, particularly to road safety and drug awareness education.
- Julia McConnel – For service to parachuting.
- Alistair James McCooke – For service to surf lifesaving.
- Terrence Hugh McCosker – For service to primary industry.
- Tom McCullough – For service to the galleries sector.
- Captain Edgar James McDermott (Retd) – For service to veterans.
- Peggy Janeen McDonald – For service to conservation and the environment.
- The late Darcy James McFadden – For service to the community of Lismore.
- Mary McGowan – For service to nursing, and to the community through charitable initiatives.
- Florence Lesley McGurgan – For service to local government, and to the community.
- Susan Kim McHattie – For service to people living with Acquired Brain Injury, and their families.
- Mairi Margaret Philomena McIntosh – For service to veterans, and to the community.
- Margaret Jane McIntyre – For service to community health.
- Rosanne Elizabeth McKeand – For service to the community through art programs.
- Ross McKenzie – For service to cricket, and to the community of Rye.
- John Scott McLeod – For service to the community of Newcastle.
- Dr Margaret Frances McLeod – For service to conservation and the environment.
- Pamela McPherson – For service to netball.
- Russell Devenish Meares – For service to mineral exploration.
- Kym Meers – For service to the community through charitable initiatives.
- John William Melrose – For service to the community of Batlow.
- John Menzel – For service to horticulture.
- The late Raymond Harold Mepham – For service to conservation and the environment.
- The late David Mercer – For service to golf.
- Peter Thomas Meurer – For service to the community through charitable organisations.
- Frederick Bernhard Miegel – For service to nursing.
- Josephine Millard – For service to rowing.
- Amanda Miller – For service to the community through the philanthropic and impact investing sectors.
- Dannielle Miller – For service to education, to women, and to youth.
- Desley Joan Miller – For service to education, and to community mental health.
- The Reverend Gayl Katrina Mills – For service to chaplaincy, and to the Anglican Church of Australia.
- Brenley McMillan Milsom – For service to the community of the Gold Coast.
- Roxanne Marsha Missingham – For service to the library and information sciences.
- Elaine Myfanwy Mitchell – For service to the performing arts.
- Kevin Charles Mitchell – For service to Australian rules football.
- Lauren Stephanie Mitchell – For service to gymnastics.
- Jennifer Grace Monaghan – For service to the community of Kings Langley.
- Alison Elizabeth Monk – For service to hockey.
- Kathleen Joyce Monley – For service to the community through a range of roles.
- Major Margaret Ann More, RFD (Retd) – For service to veterans.
- Brother Stephen Joseph Morelli – For service to the Indigenous community of the Mid-North Coast of New South Wales.
- Susan Beaufort Morgan – For service to the community through charitable initiatives.
- Bernadette Ann Mottram, RFD – For service to nursing, and to veterans.
- Joan Moylan – For service to the community through the Catholic Church of Australia.
- John Michael Mula – For service to Catholic education.
- Annette Elizabeth Mundt – For service to the community of Beenleigh.
- Cynthia Munro – For service to veterans and their families.
- Lindsay Edmund Murdoch – For service to journalism.
- Susan Veronica Murray – For service to the community, particularly to breast cancer research and suicide prevention.
- Diane Lesley Nailon – For service to early childhood education.
- Dr Gerard Michael Naughtin – For service to people with disability.
- Carolyn Naunton – For service to youth through the Girls' Brigade.
- Beryl Anne Neilsen – For service to the community through charitable organisations.
- Mary Anne Neilsen – For service to the community as a church organist.
- Lance Robert Netherway – For service to the community of Wimmera Mallee.
- Dr Michael Newman – For service to ophthalmology.
- Phong Thaddeus Aloysius Nguyen – For service to the Vietnamese community.
- Susan Elizabeth Nicholls – For service to the community of Gulgong.
- Lorin James Nicholson – For service to people who are blind or have low vision.
- Daniel Nicolas – For service to business and commerce, and to the Lebanese community.
- Salim Nicolas – For service to business and commerce, and to the Lebanese community.
- David Niven – For service to the law, and to consumer affairs.
- Dr Michael Nixon – For service to rural and remote medicine.
- Beverley Carmel Noonan – For service to the community through charitable organisations.
- Catherine Elizabeth Norman – For service to aged welfare.
- Norma Joan Notley – For service to youth through Scouts.
- Casey Michelle Nunn ASM – For service to the community of Craigieburn.
- Judith Christine O'Brien – For service to the community of Kiama.
- Megan O'Connell – For service to secondary education.
- Karen Melita O'Neill – For service to people with disability.
- Laura O'Reilly – For service to people with disability.
- Dr David Peter O'Rourke – For service to medicine, and to the international community of West Timor.
- Robert Thomas Orr – For service to conservation and the environment.
- James Ostroburski – For service to the community through charitable organisations.
- Arthur David Owen – For service to cricket.
- Richard James Owen – For service to business.
- Nak-Yoon Paik – For service to veterans.
- Ewan Norman Palmer – For service to the community of Rockhampton, and to rugby union.
- Arthur Papadimitriou – For service to the galleries sector.
- Madeline Parish – For service to the community of Coffs Harbour.
- Catherine Parsons – For service to choral music.
- Dianne Pascoe – For service to netball.
- Carol Ann Paterson – For service to horse sports.
- Dianne Joyce Paterson – For service to youth through Guides, and to the community.
- Helen Patsikatheodorou – For service to the community of Hume.
- John Patterson – For service to horse racing.
- Julie Ann Paul – For service to community health.
- Dr John David Paull – For service to medicine, and to history.
- Margaret Dawn Peacock – For service to the community of Frankston.
- Karen Ann Pearce – For service to sport administration.
- Marie-Louise Pearson – For service to the community through a range of organisations.
- Paul John Penno – For service to veterans, and to the community of Bendigo.
- Bella Perry – For service to the community of Mandurah.
- John David Perry – For service to the community of Mandurah.
- Dr Astrid Perry-Indermaur – For service to the community through migrant and women's organisations.
- Erin Phillips – For service to Australian rules football, and to basketball.
- Godfrey Phillips – For service to hockey.
- Janet Pike – For service to people with disability.
- Reverend James David Pilmer, PSM – For service to the Anglican Church of Australia.
- Dr Mark Pitney – For service to cardiology.
- Joan Berenice Playford – For service to the community of Kersbrook.
- Linsey Pollak – For service to the performing arts, and to music.
- Dug Pomeroy – For service to the community through charitable organisations.
- Roger William Poole – For service to architecture, and to the community.
- Robyn Lee Porter – For service to science, and the community.
- Therese Margaret Post – For service to the community of Uralla.
- Horace David Poussard – For service to conservation and the environment.
- Jillian Prior – For service to the law.
- James Sidney Pulsford – For service to conservation and the environment.
- Donna Rae-Szalinski – For service to cycling.
- David Garth Rankin – For service to the visual arts.
- Kay Lynette Rankin – For service to the community through a range of organisations.
- Patricia Ann Ratsch – For service to the community through a range of organisations.
- Dr Hyam Barry Rawicki – For service to medicine as a rehabilitation specialist.
- Marea Christine Reading – For service to nursing.
- Kathleen Mary Rehe – For service to tennis.
- Julie Kevall Reilly – For service to the community through charitable organisations.
- Kim Margaret Rhodes – For service to the community of Tenterfield.
- James Archibald Rice – For service to the community through social welfare organisations.
- The late Ray Rice – For service to bicycling.
- Brenda Coralie Richards – For service to the community through social welfare organisations.
- Dominic Charles Richards – For service to architecture, and to the community.
- Coralie Anne Richmond – For service to the community of the Blue Mountains.
- David Rickards – For service to the not-for-profit sector, and to the environment.
- Lynne Ridge – For service to industrial relations, and to the trade union sector.
- Sylvia May Ridgway – For service to the community of Koo Wee Rup.
- Roger Alan Riley – For service to rugby league.
- Michael Toufic Rizk – For service to business and commerce, and to the Lebanese community.
- Dr Kaye Frances Roberts-Thomson – For service to dentistry, and to the community.
- Michael Douglas Robertson – For service to the community as a foster carer, and to transport safety.
- Dr Laurence Roddick – For service to paediatric medicine.
- Victor Charles Rodwell – For service to the community of Hastings and Western Port.
- William Edward Roper – For service to amateur radio.
- Bevan Roy Routledge – For service to the community, and to sport.
- Emeritus Professor James Baber Rowe – For service to science as a researcher and educator.
- Dr David Francis Rowlands – For service to medicine in general practice.
- Peter Harry Rubin – For service to the community through a range of organisations.
- Gregory Ian Russell – For service to veterans.
- The late Paul Douglas Russell – For service to the community of the Atherton Tableland.
- Leonard Andrew Ryan – For service to the community as a church organist.
- The late Robert John Ryan – For service to athletics.
- Sonya Ryan – For service to children as a cyber safety campaigner and advocate.
- Noel Desmond Saal – For service to the community of South East Queensland.
- Amir Salem – For service to the Egyptian community of Australia.
- Pauline Mary Samson – For service to swimming.
- Ian Hunter Sandell – For service to youth through Scouts.
- Wendy Margaret Sanders – For service to cycling.
- Liberty Sanger – For service to the law, and to the community.
- Graham Biron Sauvage – For service to the aged care sector, and to the community.
- Denise Hurley Schellbach – For service to the community through a range of organisations.
- Dr Michael Roland Schultz – For service to medicine as a surgeon.
- George Arthur Scott – For service to the community of Wonthaggi.
- Joan Lillian Scott – For service to the community of Wonthaggi.
- Mark Anthony Scully, CSM – For service to youth.
- Pauline Beryl Sedivka – For service to music as a performer and mentor.
- Dr Selvanayagam Selvendra – For service to multicultural organisations, and to medicine.
- Peter Clement Semmler, QC – For service to the law.
- Helen Jean Shardey – For service to the Jewish community of Victoria.
- David Henry Shaw – For service to the community health, and to Australian rules football.
- Joanne Patricia Sheehan-Paterson – For service to the community through social welfare organisations.
- Alison Jane Sherry – For service to the community through a range of organisations.
- Ruan Sims – For service to rugby league.
- Adrian Joseph Skurnik – For service to the Jewish community.
- Robert David Slater – For service to football.
- Elaine Mary Smith – For service to refugees.
- Patrick Hugh Smith – For service to the print media as a journalist.
- Shirley Ann Smith – For service to the community of the Wimmera region.
- Matt Smolcic – For service to aged welfare.
- Dr Wendy Smyth – For service to nursing.
- Roxley Carl Snare – For service to the community of Wynyard.
- David John Sollom – For service to rowing.
- Cecilia Ellen Sounness – For service to the community of Mount Barker.
- Professor Melissa Caroline Southey – For service to epidemiology and precision medicine.
- Lesley Violet Sowell – For service to the community of the South Coast.
- Kaye Speed – For service to people who are blind or have low vision.
- Stephen Basil Spence – For service to veterans.
- Vivian Mary Spilva – For service to the community of Yarrawonga-Mulwala.
- Faye Spiteri – For service to the community through social change organisations.
- Jackie Stamford – For service to people with disability.
- John Francis Stanhope – For service to the community of Healesville.
- Norma Stead – For service to tennis, and to the community of Kiama.
- Kobe Steele – For service to conservation and the environment.
- Elizabeth Ann Stephenson – For service to veterans and their families.
- Lynette Elizabeth Stephenson – For service to the community of Pakenham.
- Joseph Peter Stevens – For service to athletics.
- Lloyd John Stevens – For service to the Vietnamese community of South Australia.
- Jeffrey Stewart – For service to the community of Drysdale.
- Lee Harvey Stockley – For service to veterans.
- Kathryn Louise Stokes – For service to the minerals and mining sector, and to the community.
- Shirley Joyce Stonestreet – For service to the community of Dubbo.
- Professor Glenn Reginald Summerhayes – For service to tertiary education, and to history.
- Harold James Summers – For service to athletics.
- Jill Swann – For service to the galleries sector.
- Michael John Sweeney – For service to the community, and to the law.
- Janet Patricia Synot – For service to the arts, to the community, and to badminton.
- Belinda Susan Tallis – For service to the community through the not-for-profit sector.
- Lesley Eleanor Tan – For service to audiology.
- Jennifer Dingena Tarrant – For service to the hair industry, and to humanitarian initiatives.
- Helen Florence Tartellin – For service to the community through charitable organisations.
- David John Taylor – For service to veterans.
- Joan Osma Taylor – For service to secondary education, and the community.
- Raylee Annette Taylor – For service to community health.
- Alan Thomas – For service to horse racing.
- David Norman Thomas – For service to the community through a range of roles.
- Robert John Thompson – For service to surf lifesaving.
- Shantelle Joan Thompson – For service to the Indigenous community of Victoria.
- Edward Alan Thornburrow – For service to the restaurant and catering industry.
- James Tilley – For service to seniors.
- Dr Michele Toner – For service to community health.
- Dr Albert George Graber Tonga – For service to medicine through a range of roles.
- Marjolein Towler – For service to women in business.
- Thanh-Kham Tran-Dang – For service to the Vietnamese community of Victoria.
- Frank Ronald Tudball – For service to tennis.
- Anne Therese Tudor – For service to people living with Dementia and their supporters.
- Brian Turner – For service to the veterans.
- Margaret Joan Turner – For service to youth through Scouts.
- Marion June Uebergang – For service to tennis.
- Deborah Joan Upstill – For service to the community of Monash.
- Pamela Judith Usher – For service to the community through charitable organisations.
- Dr John James Van Bockxmeer – For service to medicine, and to the community.
- John Vander Veeken – For service to football.
- Pamela Marilyn Vardy – For service to horticulture, and to radio media.
- Dr Philip Henry Vardy – For service to sailing.
- The Honourable Rosemary Varty – For service to the community, and to lawn bowls.
- Dindy Belinda Vaughan – For service to the arts.
- John Christian Vaughan – For service to vexillography and history preservation.
- Paul Kenneth Vear – For service to squash.
- Dr John Edward Veron – For service to marine research.
- Margaret Beryl Vincent – For service to community health.
- Barry Noel Vining – For service to rugby league.
- Gino Anthony Vumbaca – For service to public health, and to the justice system.
- Max Wald – For service to the Jewish community.
- Anthony Louis Walker – For service to veterans.
- Clive John Walker – For service to the community of Myrtleford.
- Mary Catherine Walker – For service to the law.
- Anthony Waller – For service to surf lifesaving, and to the community.
- Brendan Enda Walsh – For service to radio.
- Alice Mary Walters – For service to the community through choral music.
- Hannah Louise Wandel – For service to women's affairs, and the community.
- Geoffrey Wark – For service to Morris dancing.
- Gwenyth Doreen Warmington – For service to the community of Yass.
- Brian Norman Warren – For service to veterans.
- Allison Dawn Waterhouse – For service to community history.
- Julie Deirdre Watts – For service to literature as a publisher.
- Angela Jane Weeks – For service to people with disability.
- Dr Miriam Weisz – For service to community health.
- Robert Paul Wellington – For service to science education.
- Brendan Cyrus Welsh – For service to the community through charitable organisations.
- Jeanette Kaye Welsh – For service to the community of Macksville.
- Allan Leslie West – For service to veterans.
- Catherine Madeleine West – For service to the medical research community.
- Raymond Leslie Weston – For service to youth, and to emergency response organisations.
- Brett Peter Weymark – For service to the performing arts through music.
- Douglas Bruce Whan – For service to the community through the church.
- Claire Agnes White – For service to the community of Yaapeet.
- Martin Charles White – For service to the community of Bribie Island.
- Timothy John White – For service to music.
- Margaret Isabell Whittaker – For service to the community of the Gold Coast.
- Alan Wiggins – For service to hockey.
- John Charles Wightwick – For service to youth through Scouts.
- James Edward Wilcox – For service to the community through a range of organisations.
- Allan Barrington Williams – For service to the community of the Sutherland Shire.
- Brenda Elizabeth Williams – For service to netball.
- John Suthern Williams – For service to the merino wool industry.
- Rosslyn Joy Williams – For service to community health.
- Walter George Williams – For service to veterans and their families.
- Dr Richard Lyall Willing – For service to conservation and the environment.
- Lyla Isabelle Wills – For service to primary education, and to the community.
- Robinson George Wilson – For service to veterans.
- Gwen Margaret Winsor – For service to netball.
- Brian Wise – For service to the broadcast media, particularly to radio.
- Dr Eric Woehler – For service to bird ecology.
- Clinical Professor Alan Michael Wolff – For service to medicine.
- Lawrence Raymond Woodman – For service to sport coaching and development.
- Jacqueline Sandra Wright – For service to international health.
- Brett Yeats – For service to the community of the Australian Capital Territory.
- Gregory Ross Young – For service to veterans.
- Malcolm David Young – For service to the community of Double Bay.
- Margaret Young – For service to early childhood education.
- Morri Young – For service to the community through a range of roles.
- The late Dr Valerie Constance Yule – For service to psychology as a clinician and author.
- Margaret Joan Zell – For service to the community of Tooraweenah.
- Dr Karen Joy Zwi – For service to paediatric medicine.

==== Military Division ====
Navy

- Warrant Officer Wayde Clifford Bilsborow – For meritorious performance of duty as a Navy representative within the Air Warfare Destroyer Program.
- Commander Roslyn Rose Connor, RAN – For meritorious performance of duty in the field of Navy leadership and cultural development.
- Commander Griffyd Bryan Eldridge, RAN – For meritorious service in the field of Navy Marine Engineering.
- Commander Paul Anthony Fothergill, RAN – For meritorious performance of duty in the recognition of service for current and ex-serving members, as the Director Navy Honours and Awards.
- Commander Paul Colin Hornsby, RAN – For meritorious performance of duty in the field of robotic and autonomous systems.
- Chief Petty Officer L – For meritorious performance of duty in the field of Navy Clearance Diving.
- Warrant Officer Shannon-Lee Samuel Power – For meritorious performance of duty in the field of Navy and Joint Military Policing.

Army

- Major A – For meritorious service in the development of frameworks for the management of sensitive, joint interagency capabilities over a period spanning more than two decades.
- Warrant Officer Class One Andrew Jay Beaman – For meritorious devotion to duty as the Artificer Sergeant Major of the 1st Brigade, 3rd Brigade and 1st Armoured Regiment.
- Major David Andrew Devine – For meritorious performance of duty in advancing the Australian Defence Force's Electronic Warfare, Signals Intelligence, Cyberspace and Advanced Capabilities.
- Major Russell Wayne Hamsey – For meritorious performance of duty in advancing the Australian Defence Force's unmanned aerial systems capabilities.
- Warrant Officer Class One Virginia Lee Ann Morris – For meritorious performance of duty as the Regimental Sergeant Major of 2nd General Health Battalion and 7th Combat Service Support Battalion.
- Major Anthony John Said – For meritorious service as the Operations Officer and Executive Officer of 2nd/17th Battalion, the Royal New South Wales Regiment, and as Brigade Major 5th Brigade.
- Colonel James Graham Waddell – For meritorious performance of duty as Director of Operations and Security Law and as Director of Army Legal Services for the Australian Defence Force.
- Warrant Officer Class One Adrian Dennis Wilson – For meritorious performance as the Regimental Sergeant Major of the 1st Battalion, the Royal Australian Regiment, 2/30 Training Group Malaysia, 41st Royal New South Wales Regiment and as the Wing Sergeant Major Tactics Wing at the School of Infantry.
- Colonel Susan Kaye Winter, CSC – For meritorious service as a specialist anaesthetist and intensivist on multiple overseas deployments and specialist medical advisor to the 2nd General Health Battalion, 3rd Health Support Battalion and Army Health Services.

Air Force

- Warrant Officer Russell Leonard Beck, CSC – For meritorious service in aviation maintenance and safety reform for the Royal Australian Air Force.
- Squadron Leader Scott Gregory Van Ginkel – For meritorious performance of duty in pilot training development and implementation for the Australian Defence Force.

==== Honorary ====
- Joy Violet Campbell-Stephen – For service to the community of North Sydney.
- Colin Frost – For service to electrical engineering.
- Dr Peter Jeffrey Harris – For service to maritime heritage preservation.
- Jennifer Myfanwy Thompson – For service to the community of Batemans Bay.
- Paul Watmough – For service to swimming.

== Meritorious Service ==
=== Public Service Medal (PSM) ===
Public Service Medal ribbon

Commonwealth

- Jessica Isla Ballinger – For outstanding public service through social support services for Indigenous and vulnerable people in Queensland.
- Shane Andrew Bennett – For outstanding public service to the development of social security policies, particularly to the design of the Government's economic support payments during the COVID-19 pandemic.
- Dr Sarah Jane Benson – For outstanding public service through driving innovation and forensic science capability for the Australian Federal Police.
- Elisabeth Mae Bowes – For outstanding public service to international trade policy, particularly as Head of the Tobacco Plain Packaging Taskforce.
- James Buttigieg – For outstanding public service to consular and crisis management, and enabling complex arrangements for the repatriation of Australians abroad during COVID-19.
- Shane Patrick Carmody – For outstanding public service to modernising air safety regulations and drone pilot licensing.
- Chris Faulkner – For outstanding public service to complex development of policy in support of Australians with a disability during the COVID-19 pandemic.
- Belinda Jane Fraser – For outstanding public service to fostering collaborative arrangements for securing ventilators for the Australian Government National Medical Stockpile in response to the COVID-19 pandemic.
- Paul John Grigson – For outstanding public service through driving resolutions to complex issues and the Government's response and recovery during the COVID-19 pandemic.
- Anna (Anastasia) Harmer – For outstanding public service to law reform, and through leading the Office of the Royal Commission into Natural Disaster Arrangements.
- Matthew Frederick Hay – For outstanding public service in the application of contemporary online services, core technology platforms, and complex IT systems for the Australian Taxation Office.
- Rachel Jasmine Jolly – For outstanding public service through innovative policy development and implementation supporting Pacific Islander workers during the COVID-19 pandemic.
- Peter Leonard Masterson – For outstanding public service through leading engagement with local business communities, linking them to Government and Industry business grants and support programs.
- Alison Jayne McMillan – For outstanding public service to driving the Government's national health response priorities during the COVID-19 pandemic, particularly to infection prevention measures.
- Niko Milic – For outstanding public service through the development of communications protocols in aged care facilities during the COVID-19 pandemic.
- Debbie Mitchell – For outstanding public service to the implementation of Government policy and the delivery of streamlined Job Seeker service to support Australians.
- James Matthew O'Halloran – For outstanding public service to superannuation reforms, and to the implementation of infrastructure to enable the Government's economic support measures to Australians during the COVID-19 pandemic.
- Ann Elizabeth Redmond – For outstanding public service in program design, particularly through the support of the regional aviation industry as part of the COVID Aviation Response Task Force.
- Michael Ryan – For outstanding public service to policy and program development to ensure a supply of an agricultural workforce during COVID-19.
- Rebecca Lee Skinner – For outstanding public service in the areas of national security policy, intelligence, business transformation and service delivery.
- Celia Street – For outstanding public service through driving the Government's national health response priorities during the COVID-19 pandemic.

New South Wales

- Leanne Barnes, OAM – For outstanding public service to local government in New South Wales.
- Dr Michelle Aléna Cretikos – For outstanding public service to community health in New South Wales.
- Joanne Louise Edwards – For outstanding public service to community health in New South Wales.
- Jason Scott Elderhurst – For outstanding public service to building services in New South Wales.
- Karen Anne Jones – For outstanding public service to education in New South Wales.
- Dr Jeremy Montgomery McAnulty – For outstanding public service to infectious diseases monitoring and environmental health in New South Wales.
- Dr Christine Enid Selvey – For outstanding public service to infectious disease reporting and public health in New South Wales.
- Patrisha L Van Tussenbroek – For outstanding public service to emergency planning and response in the education sector in New South Wales.

Queensland

- Gregg Buyers – For outstanding public service to infrastructure projects in Queensland.
- James Huggett – For outstanding public service to maritime safety in Queensland.
- Associate Professor Anthony Charles Lamont – For outstanding public service to paediatric radiology in Queensland.
- Dr Deborough Anne Macbeth – For outstanding public service to community health in Queensland.
- Annette Maree Scott – For outstanding public service to community health in Queensland.

South Australia

- Scott Brenton Loechel – For outstanding public service to local government emergency coordination and assistance in South Australia.
- Maxine Susan McSherry – For outstanding public service to the community of Kangaroo Island, and to education.
- Professor Nicola Jane Spurrier – For outstanding public service to community health in South Australia.

Victoria

- Rebecca (Beck) Angel – For outstanding public service to Victoria Police.
- Jenny Atta – For outstanding public service to strategic social policy reform and delivery in Victoria.
- Denis William Flett – For outstanding public service to water management in Victoria.
- Fernando Ianni – For outstanding public service to secondary education in Victoria.
- Merrin Mason – For outstanding public service to law reform in Victoria.
- Dr Mark Norman – For outstanding public service to conservation and biodiversity management in Victoria.
- Christopher David Reidy – For outstanding public service to community celebrations in Victoria.
- Linda Joan Weatherson – For outstanding public service to social welfare initiatives in Victoria.

Western Australia

- Kirsten Jade Chivers – For outstanding public service through roles with the State Solicitor's Office in Western Australia.
- Nicki Godecke – For outstanding public service to Western Australia through a range of roles.
- Kaylene Patricia Gulich – For outstanding public service to Western Australia through a range of roles.

=== Australian Police Medal (APM) ===
Australian Police Medal ribbon

Australian Federal Police

- Sergeant Gregory James Corin
- Detective Superintendent Gail McClure

New South Wales Police Force

- Superintendent Julie Catherine Boon
- Detective Inspector Glen Murray Browne
- Superintendent Rashelle Fiona Conroy
- Detective Superintendent Paul James Devaney BM
- Superintendent David Richard Driver
- Superintendent Kylie Maree Endemi
- Chief Inspector Gregory John Flood
- Detective Chief Inspector Neil Anthony Hallinan
- Chief Inspector Sean Patrick McDermott
- Detective Superintendent Craig Neil Middleton
- Detective Chief Inspector Paul Joseph Simpkins

NT Police, Fire & Emergency Services

- Superintendent Lauren Jane Hill

Queensland Police Force

- Senior Sergeant Sean Kennet Baxendell
- Detective Senior Sergeant Margaret Maureen Cassidy
- Detective Senior Sergeant Daren Andrew Edwards
- Chief Superintendent Brian Rex Huxley
- Detective Senior Sergeant Jillian McCarthy
- Detective Senior Sergeant Grant Douglas Ralston
- Sergeant Megan Elizabeth Ward

South Australia Police Force

- Senior Sergeant Christopher Drew Holland
- Senior Sergeant First Class Sharon Lynne Walker-Roberts
- Senior Sergeant First Class Gregory Raymond Williams

Tasmania Police Force

- Assistant Commissioner Adrian Paul Bodnar

Victoria Police

- Senior Sergeant Greg Jason Dean
- Superintendent Jenelle Fuller
- Senior Sergeant Mark Douglas Hesse
- Inspector Christopher Thomas Major
- Detective Senior Sergeant Janet Ruth Mitchell
- Superintendent Paul Gerard O'Halloran
- Superintendent Peter Hans Seiz
- Senior Sergeant Alfred David Watson

Western Australia Police Force

- Commander Allan Robert Adams
- Detective Senior Sergeant Joseph Domenic Marrapodi
- Detective Inspector Leo Ricciardi
- Senior Constable Deslea Patricia Sloan

=== Australian Fire Service Medal (AFSM) ===
AFSM ribbon

ACT Fire and Rescue

- Paul Robert Flynn

Fire and Rescue New South Wales

- Leslie Carr
- Noel David Cullane, OAM
- Peter Gregory Dunn
- Michelle Engelsman
- Jeff Terrence Gould
- Neville Denzil Lawrence, OAM
- Carolyn Nancy Noon
- David Alan Peters
- Geoffrey Peter Ryan
- Paul Sweeney
- Murray Vernon West

Northern Territory Fire and Rescue Service

- Matthew Roger Wilson

Queensland Fire and Emergency Services

- Bradley Andrew Commens
- Tony James Johnstone

Country Fire Authority of Victoria

- Peter David Baker
- Garry David Cook
- Brian William Petrie
- Lesley Gay Read
- Simon John Scharf
- Peter John Solly, ASM
- Stephen Michael Walls

Department of Environment, Land, Water and Planning

- Kelly Marie Rash
- Alen Slijepcevic

Fire and Rescue Victoria

- Steven John Watts

Western Australia Department of Fire & Emergency Services

- Andrew John Thompson

=== Ambulance Service Medal (ASM) ===
ASM ribbon

New South Wales Ambulance Services

- Peter James Cribbs
- Simmone Louise Locke
- Michelle Rose Shiel

Queensland Ambulance Service

- Sandra Michelle Cowley
- Denis James O'Keefe
- Peter Edward Solomon

South Australian Ambulance Service

- Michael Klaus Bohrnsen

=== Emergency Services Medal (ESM) ===
ESM ribbon

Australian Capital Territory

- James George Montgomery

New South Wales

- Michael Raymond Boadle
- Heather Maree Stuart
- Christopher Warren
- Anthony Paul Younglove

Northern Territory

- David John Hawkes

Queensland

- Lieutenant Colonel Brian John Cox, CSC

Victoria

- Dinah Leeanne Boswell
- Kimberley Ann Gee

=== Australian Corrections Medal (ACM) ===
ACM ribbon

Australian Capital Territory

- Steven Allen Morey

New South Wales

- Sarah Elizabeth Howard
- Kenneth Hanipale Pese
- Louise Maree Smith

Queensland

- Evie Georgas
- Larry John Guilfoyle
- Lucy Rockett

South Australia

- Mark Ronald Humphrys

Victoria

- Brian Patrick Smith
- Elizabeth Ann Swales

== Distinguished and Conspicuous Service ==
=== Bar to the Distinguished Service Medal (DSM and Bar) ===
Distinguished Service Medal and Bar ribbon

- Lieutenant Colonel S, DSM – For distinguished leadership in warlike operations as a Task Group Commander on Operation OKRA from December 2019 to July 2020.

=== Distinguished Service Medal (DSM) ===
Distinguished Service Medal ribbon

Army

- Colonel Nicholas James Foxall, AM – For distinguished leadership in warlike operations as Commander Task Group Taji X in the period November 2019 to March 2020.

=== Commendation for Distinguished Service ===
Commendation for Distinguished Service ribbon

Army

- Corporal Brett Michael B – For distinguished performance of duties in warlike operations as a Team Commander.
- Lieutenant Colonel Meegan Bernadette Olding – For distinguished performance of duties in warlike conditions as the Acting Chief Strategy and Plans Division, Coalition Joint Plans in the Combined Joint Task Force Headquarters of Operation Inherent Resolve during the period November 2019 to September 2020.
- Captain P – For distinguished performance of duties in warlike operations as a platoon commander.
- Lieutenant Colonel Anna Reinhardt – For distinguished performance of duties in warlike operations as the Senior Human Resources Advisor to the Ministry of Interior Affairs while force assigned to Operation HIGHROAD from 24 November 2018 to 8 September 2019, in Kabul, Afghanistan.

=== Bar to the Conspicuous Service Cross (CSC and Bar) ===
Navy

- Commander Phillipa Hay, CSC, RAN – For outstanding achievement in the field of Maritime Planning and Operational Command.
- Captain Phillip Andrew Henry, CSC, RAN – For outstanding achievement as Director Navy Recruiting Retention and Transition.

=== Conspicuous Service Cross (CSC) ===
CSC ribbon

Navy

- Commander Gavin Ashley Milkins, RAN – For outstanding achievement as the Medical Head of Department and Senior Health Officer, HMAS Adelaide.
- Lieutenant Commander Ashleigh Beth Payne, RAN – For outstanding achievement as Commanding Officer HMAS Bathurst.
- Commander Moses Raudino, RAN – For outstanding achievement in the field of Navy training.
- Commander Chloe Ryan, RAN – For outstanding achievement as a Navy Medical Officer during the national response to the coronavirus pandemic emergency.
- Chief Petty Officer Benjamin Ashley Smith – For outstanding achievement during the introduction into service of the Hobart Class Destroyers.
- Commander Eloise Adele Twine, RAN – For outstanding achievement in the field of electronic warfare capability development.
- Commander Darren White, RAN – For outstanding achievement in the application of exceptional skills, judgment and leadership as Commanding Officer HMAS Sheean, on operations from December 2017 to December 2019.

Army

- Colonel Justin John Alexander – For outstanding devotion to duty in provision of education services at the Australian Defence Force Academy.
- Lieutenant Colonel Daniel Lawrence Anderson – For outstanding achievement in the application of exceptional skills, judgement and dedication as the Commanding Officer of the 1st Signal Regiment.
- Lieutenant Colonel Stuart James Baldwinson – For outstanding devotion to duty as the Commanding Officer/Chief Instructor of the Army School of Health.
- Lieutenant Colonel Gregory Richard Brown, NSC – For outstanding achievement as the Officer-In-Charge of the Health Certification Team of the 3rd Health Support Battalion.
- Lieutenant Colonel Gregory John Colton, DSM – For outstanding achievement as Staff Officer Grade One Professional Military Education - Army.
- Brigadier Michael Edward Garraway, AM – For outstanding achievement in the application of exceptional skills, judgement and dedication as the Commander of Joint Task Force 1110, Operation BUSH FIRES ASSIST 2019-2020 and as Commander of Joint Task Group 629.1, Operation COVID-19 ASSIST.
- Colonel Michael Joseph Hose – For outstanding achievement in satellite communications development for Australia and the Australian Defence Force.
- Colonel James Guthrie Hunter – For outstanding achievement as the inaugural Director Force Structure Plan Directorate, orchestrating the delivery of the first quadrennial Defence capability assessment process.
- Brigadier Christopher John Mills, AM – For outstanding achievement as the Director General Force Options and Plans through the application of exceptional skill, judgement and dedication in the planning and delivery of the 2020 Defence Force Structure Plan.
- Lieutenant Colonel Robyn Kristine O'Donnell – For outstanding achievement as the Chief Legal Officer, Army Headquarters.
- Lieutenant Colonel Ross William Thomas – For outstanding devotion to duty as the Staff Officer Grade One - Program Sustainment in Logistics Branch, Army Headquarters.
- Brigadier Robert John Watson – For outstanding achievement in the development and implementation of a Joint defensive cyberspace operations capability for the Australian Defence Force.

Air Force

- Flight Sergeant Sean Alan Bell, CSM – For outstanding achievement in F-35A Joint Strike Fighter hardware systems fleet management; and in the establishment and development of mission data products.
- Squadron Leader Paul Frederick Bowes – For outstanding achievement in air-to-surface combat support integration training at Number 4 Squadron for the Royal Australian Air Force.
- Group Captain Edwin Jamie Boyd – For outstanding achievement in organisational reform and aviation training capability sustainment for the Australian Defence Force.
- Squadron Leader Steven Henry Brady – For outstanding achievement in establishing the F-35 Joint Strike Fighter mission data development capability for the Australian Defence Force.
- Wing Commander Timothy Cantrill – For outstanding achievement in military aircraft type certification as Engineering Manager of Project Air 8000 Phase 2 acquiring the C 27J Spartan transport aircraft.
- Flight Sergeant Jenny Leigh Dillon, CSM – For outstanding devotion to duty in medical administration for the Australian Defence Force.
- Squadron Leader Michael Jeffrey Dorman – For outstanding devotion to duty to the Australian Defence Force in aviation risk management in complex operating environments.
- Wing Commander Robert Michael Gill – For outstanding achievement in knowledge systems development, operations planning, and improved allied interoperability for Headquarters Joint Operations Command.
- Flight Lieutenant Simon John Hall – For outstanding achievement in support of complex historic honours and awards research and outcomes, and administration of Royal Australian Air Force honours and decorations.
- Flight Lieutenant Aaron James Hardman – For outstanding achievement in aerospace engineering, project management, and electronic warfare capability development for the Australian Defence Force.
- Group Captain Paul Howard Jarvis – For outstanding achievement in Air Combat and Airborne Electronic Attack capability development for the Australian Defence Force
- Air Commodore David John Paddison – For outstanding devotion to duty in combat capability development for the Australian Defence Force.
- Air Commodore Benjamin John Sleeman, DSM – For outstanding achievement in non-warlike operations whilst deployed as Director Combined Air and Space Operations Centre, United States Air Force Central Command.
- Flight Lieutenant Andrew Luke Willersdorf – For outstanding achievement in capability development of the C-27J Spartan at Number 35 Squadron for the Royal Australian Air Force.

=== Conspicuous Service Medal (CSM) ===
CSM ribbon

Navy

- Lieutenant Commander Peter Edward Chapman, RAN – For meritorious achievement in the field of Maritime Logistics Officer Workgroup Management.
- Lieutenant Commander Sarah Maree Eddes, RAN – For meritorious achievement as the Regional Manager of the Royal Australian Navy Fleet Support Unit North.
- Chief Petty Officer Matthew Alan Graham – For meritorious achievement in the application of exceptional skills and judgement as the Senior Technical Officer of HMAS Yarra.
- Chief Petty Officer Kerrin James Lyon – For meritorious devotion to duty as the Fleet Medical Submariner within Sea Training Unit - Submarines.
- Commander Nicole Helen Mann, RAN – For outstanding achievement as the Deputy Director of the Navy People Career Management Agency.
- Leading Seaman Brendan Michael Robinson – For meritorious achievement in the field of Signals Intelligence engineering support.
- Lieutenant Jacqueline Rushford, RAN – For meritorious achievement as the Navigating Officer of HMA Ships Glenelg and Childers.
- Lieutenant Commander Trevor Francis Teale, RAN – For meritorious devotion to duty as the Officer in Charge of the Submarine Support Group.

Army

- Warrant Officer Class Two B – For meritorious devotion to duty as a Physical Training Instructor and Human Performance Optimisation Program leader within Special Operations Command.
- Warrant Officer Class One Peter Wayne Brine – For meritorious achievement in movements support for Australian Defence Force operations, humanitarian assistance and disaster relief activities, and the Asia-Pacific Economic Forum.
- Lance Corporal Michael Alan Coulson – For meritorious devotion to duty as the Australian Defence Force Liaison Officer to the National Heavy Vehicle Regulator.
- Warrant Officer Class Two Karle Clyde Engstrom – For meritorious devotion to duty as the Squadron Sergeant Major of C Squadron, 2nd Cavalry Regiment from 2018 to 2020.
- Corporal Pierce Jordan Halliday – For meritorious achievement as the Landing Craft Maintenance Section Commander at 35 Water Transport Squadron, 10th Force Support Battalion.
- Warrant Officer Class Two Leigh Gary Hedger – For meritorious achievement as the Regimental Technical Adjutant of the 3rd Battalion, the Royal Australian Regiment, and Mechanised Warrant Officer of the 6th Battalion, the Royal Australian Regiment.
- Major Benjamin Ian McCaskill – For meritorious devotion to duty as the Staff Officer Grade Two Force Modernisation, Headquarters Forces Command and through the introduction into service of Project LAND 121 into Forces Command.
- Sergeant Jarrad Robert Mildrum – For meritorious devotion to duty as the Electronic Countermeasures Sergeant within the Land Countermeasures Reprogramming Cell at Army Headquarters.
- Lance Corporal N – For meritorious devotion to duty in the Special Air Service Regiment, Special Operations Command.
- Private Warwick Edward Naggs – For meritorious achievement as Acting Troop Leader Surveillance Troop, 2nd/14th Light Horse Regiment (Queensland Mounted Infantry).
- Major Michael Anthony Sipple – For meritorious achievement as Officer Commanding and Senior Project Engineer at 19th Chief Engineer Works.
- Lieutenant Colonel Adam Wayne Sparkes – For meritorious achievement as Staff Officer Grade One Land Intelligence, Systems and Integration Branch, Army Headquarters.
- Major Carolyn Jean Wood – For meritorious achievement in the application of authentic leadership as Officer Commanding, Specialist and Command Support Wing, Army School of Ordnance, and collaborative management through uncertainty during the 2020 Victorian bushfire crisis.

Air Force

- Squadron Leader Dianne Beverley Bell – For meritorious achievement in international engagement for the Royal Australian Air Force.
- Group Captain Paul Anthony Bowler – For meritorious achievement in operational planning and execution for the Australian Defence Force.
- Wing Commander Damien Walter Fairhurst – For meritorious achievement as the Commander of Task Unit 630.1 on Operation ACCORDION from October 2019 to June 2020.
- Flight Sergeant Lorraine Isabel Morley – For devotion to duty in training administration and development in the Air Warfare Centre for the Royal Australian Air Force.
