= Helen Scott-Orr =

Australian veterinarian and epidemiologist

Helen Scott-Orr AM PSM is an Australian veterinarian and epidemiologist. Scott-Orr served, from 25 July 2016 until 24 July 2019, as the Inspector-General of Biosecurity, a statutory body under the federal agriculture portfolio. She is a former Chief Veterinary Officer of New South Wales and Executive Director within the NSW Department of Primary Industries.

== Education ==
Scott-Orr completed a Bachelor of Veterinary Science (with honours) at the University of Sydney. She then completed a Diploma in Bacteriology, Microbiology and Immunology through the London School of Hygiene and Tropical Medicine. She was admitted as a member of the Australian College of Veterinary Scientists in Epidemiology in 1988. She became a fellow of the Australian Institute of Company Directors in 2005.

== Career ==
Scott-Orr has had a Government career spanning 40 years.

She is well known for her contribution to rabies control in Indonesia, and her efforts to increase preparedness in case of a rabies incursion into Northern Australia. She is the recipient of an Australian Government Public Service Medal (PSM).

Scott-Orr had a major role in the control and management of bovine brucellosis and tuberculosis.

She has undertaken a strategic investigation into White spot syndrome incursion into Australia.

Scott-Orr was appointed on 25 July 2016 as the first Inspector-General of Biosecurity. She was succeeded by Rob Delane on 25 July 2019.

== Affiliations ==
- Coordinator, Crawford Fund NSW Committee
- Board Director, Animal Health Australia
- Honorary Association Professor, Faculty of Veterinary Science, University of Sydney
- Board Director, Invasive Animals Cooperative Research Centre

== Former associations ==
- Project leader, Australian Centre for International Agricultural Research, NSW Department of Primary Industries http://aciar.gov.au/project/ah/2006/166
- Trustee, Organic Research and Education Trust
- NSW Agriculture, Department of Primary Industries
- Board member, Cotton Catchment Communities CRC board
- Board Director, Cattle and Beef Quality Cooperative Research Centre
- Board Director, Australian Sheep Industry Cooperative Research Centre
- Former board member, Sustainable Rice Production Cooperative Research Centre

== Awards ==
Scott-Orr received the Seddon Memorial Prize in 1991.

She received a Public Service Medal at the 2010 Australia Day Awards for Outstanding Public Service to Agricultural and Veterinary Science.

In the 2021 Queen's Birthday Honours she was appointed a Member of the Order of Australia for "significant service to public administration, to biosecurity, and to veterinary science".

== Personal life ==
Helen Scott-Orr lives in Millthorpe, New South Wales.
