= Lissant Bolton =

Australian anthropologist

Lissant Bolton AM
- Born: 1954 (age 71–72)

Academic background
- Education: University of Manchester

Academic work
- Discipline: Anthropology
- Institutions: Australian Museum, Australian National University, British Museum
- Notable works: Unfolding the Moon: Enacting Women's Kastom in Vanuatu, Art in Oceania: A New History, Melanesia: Art and Encounter

Lissant Mary Bolton AM (born 1954) is an Australian anthropologist and Visiting Senior Fellow in the London School of Economics Anthropology Department. She was Keeper of the Department of Africa, Oceania and the Americas at the British Museum until 2025. She is particularly known for her work on Vanuatu, textiles, and museums and indigenous communities.

== Career ==
Bolton began her museum career in the Anthropology division of the Australian Museum firstly for the pilot survey of the Australian Pacific collections in 1979. From 1985 she was the collection manager, and then senior collection manager, for the Australian Museum's Pacific collection. During this time Bolton took leave to undertake her PhD in social anthropology at the University of Manchester which she completed in 1994. Bolton left the Australian Museum in 1996 to work as an Australian Research Council Post-doctoral Fellow at the Centre for Cross Cultural Research at the Australian National University. From 1999 Bolton was a curator in the Department of Ethnography (later Department of Africa, Oceania and the Americas) at the British Museum and from January 2012 became Keeper (head of department) of Africa, Oceania and the Americas.

In 2026 Bolton left the British Museum, becoming Visiting Senior Fellow in the Department of Anthropology, London School of Economics and Political Science.

Bolton works in Vanuatu regularly with the Vanuatu Cultural Centre (Vanuatu Kaljoral Senta) developing programmes to document and preserve women's knowledge and practice. She chairs the Women's Culture Project workshops, supporting ni-Vanuatu women fieldworkers who document and preserve traditional knowledge and culture.

Bolton has worked on a series of major research projects focusing on western Pacific and Australian anthropology. She has worked on Melanesian art: objects, narratives and indigenous owners (2005-2010) with Nicholas Thomas (University of Cambridge); and two Australian Research Council funded projects with the Australian National University and the National Museum of Australia. These were Engaging Objects: Indigenous Communities, museum collections and the representation of indigenous histories (2011-2014), and The Relational Museum and its Objects (2016-2020). A further ARC-funded project followed: Mobilising Aboriginal Objects: Indigenous history in International Museums.a collaboration between the Australian National University, the La Perouse Aboriginal community through the Gujaga Foundation and La Perouse Local Aboriginal Land Council, the British Museum, the Museum of Archaeology and Anthropology at Cambridge University, and the NSW State Library, led by Professor Maria Nugent.

Among Bolton's curatorial work for the British Museum she was the lead curator in 2003 for the permanent gallery Living and Dying (The Wellcome Trust Gallery), and curated a number of temporary exhibitions including Power and Taboo: Sacred Objects from the Pacific (2006), Dazzling the Enemy: shields from the Pacific (2009), Baskets and Belonging: Indigenous Australian Histories (2011) and Reimagining Captain Cook: Pacific Perspectives (2019).

From 2018-25 Bolton was the founding Director of the Endangered Material Knowledge Programme at the British Museum.

== Honours ==
Twentieth anniversary of Independence Silver Medal, presented for services to culture, by the Republic of Vanuatu in 2000.

Lead curator on the Living and Dying Gallery (Wellcome Trust Gallery) at the British Museum which won the Museums and Heritage Award for best Permanent Exhibition 2004.

Keynote Address to the Australian Anthropological Society Conference 2012 at the University of Queensland on Materialised moments: objects, museum and Melanesia.

Member of the Order of Australia for "significant service to the museums sector, and to anthropology" in the 2021 Queen's Birthday Honours.

Raymond Firth Memorial Lecture to the European Society for Oceanists conference, Ajaccio, Corsica 5 June 2022 on Wrapping in colour: movements and meanings in the western Pacific.

British Museum’s William Buller Fagg Annual Lecture 10 November 2025: Anomalous Objects: insights from material culture into the voyaging history of the Pacific.

== Publications ==
=== Books and edited volumes ===
- Mitchell, J and L. Bolton (eds) The Art of Gardens: Views from Melanesia and Amazonia. Anthropological Forum. Special Issue 31:4 (2021)
- J. Adams, L. Bolton, T. Guillaume-Jaillet, M. McMahon, G. Sculthorpe, Reimagining Captain Cook: Pacific Perspectives (London: The British Museum, 2019).
- Sculthorpe, G., J. Carty, H. Morphy, M. Nugent, I. Coates, L. Bolton and J. Jones. Indigenous Australia: Enduring Civilisation (London: British Museum Press, 2015).
- B. Burt and L. Bolton (eds.), The things we value: Culture and History in Solomon Islands (Oxon: Sean Kingston Publishing, 2014)
- L. Bolton, Nicholas Thomas, Elizabeth Bonshek, Julie Adams and Ben Burt (eds.), Melanesia: Art and Encounter (London: British Museum Press, 2013).
- Brunt, Peter, Sean Mallon, Nicholas Thomas, Deidre Brown, Lissant Bolton, Suzanne Kuchler and Damian Skinner (co-authors), Art in Oceania: A New History (London: Thames and Hudson, 2012).
- L. Bolton and N. Stanley (eds.), "Framing the Art of West Papua", The Asia Pacific Journal of Anthropology, Special Issue 12(4) (2011).
- M. Rodman, D. Kramer, L. Bolton and J. Tarisesei (eds.) House-girls Remember: Domestic Workers in Vanuatu (Honolulu: University of Hawai’i Press, 2007).
- L. Bolton, Unfolding the moon: Enacting Women's Kastom in Vanuatu (Honolulu: University of Hawai’i Press, 2003).

=== Articles ===
- Textiles and the power of women (Textiles et le pouvoir des femmes). In Patoule-Edoumba, Elise (ed) Vanuatu: pouvoirs des femmes. La Rochelle: ImpriMarie LR (Muséum La Rochelle) pp.111-119. (2025)
- A perspective through trees: anthropology, development and documentation. In Gilberthorpe, Emma, (ed.), Anthropological Perspectives on Global Challenges. London: Routledge, (ASA Monographs) https://doi.org/10.4324/9781003460954 (2024)
- History through one life: Jean Tarisesei, women’s kastom and social change in Vanuatu. In Durand Marie, Monika Stern & Eric Wittersheim (eds.), Le Vanuatu dans tous ses états : recherches et débats en anthropologie, Paris, Presses de l’INALCO-Credo Publications. (2024)
- Objects, Knowledge, And Museums: Reflections on the Endangered Material Knowledge Programme. In Dagmar Schäfer, Annapurna Mamidipudi and Marius Buning (eds) Ownership of Knowledge: Beyond Intellectual Property. MIT Press Volume (2023) https://doi.org/10.7551/mitpress/14648.003.0018
- Systems of Value in Vanuatu: reflections on the Ambae textile complex. In Morphy, H and MacKenzie, R (eds) Museums, Societies and the Creation of Value Routledge pp123-137 (2022) https://doi.org/10.4324/9781003139324
- Lissant Bolton & Jean Mitchell The Art of Gardens: An Introduction. In Anthropological Forum, 31:4, 339-351 (2021) https://doi.org/10.1080/00664677.2021.2006603
- Visitors to the rainforest: Engagements with environments and outsiders in far north Queensland. In Gaye Sculthorpe, Maria Nugent and Howard Morphy (eds) Ancestors, Artefacts, Empires: Indigenous Australia in British museums. British Museum Press. (20210
- "Making baskets, making exhibitions: Indigenous Australian baskets at the British Museum". In Stephanie Bunn and Victoria Mitchell (eds) The Material Culture of Basketry (London: Bloomsbury, 2020), 155–163.
- "Museums and cultural centres in Melanesia: a series of experiments". In Hirsch, E. and W. Rollason (eds) The Melanesian World. (London: Routledge, 2019).
- A tale of two figures: Knowledge around objects in museum collections (L’histoire de deux figures: savoir lié aux objets dans les collections des musées) Le Journal de la Société des Océanistes 146 (Special Issue: Le Sepik: société et production matérielle), 2018, 87-98 URL: http://journals.openedition.org/jso/8206
- Anthony Forge and Innovation: perspectives from Vanuatu. In A. Clark and N. Thomas (eds) Style and Meaning: Essays on the anthropology of art: Anthony Forge (Leiden: Sidestone Press, 2017), 235–42.
- "Moving objects: Indigenous Australia in the British Museum." In Encounters: Revealing Stories of Aboriginal and Torres Strait Islander Objects from the British Museum (Canberra: National Museum of Australia, 2015).
- "An Ethnography of Repatriation: Engagements with Erromango, Vanuatu." In Coombes, A.E. and R.B. Phillips (eds.) International Handbooks of Museum Studies, Volume IV: Museum Transformations. (Oxford: Blackwell, 2015), 229–48.
- "Women and customary land tenure in Vanuatu: Changing understandings." In Hviding, E. and G. White (eds) Pacific Alternatives: Cultural Politics in Contemporary Oceania (Canon Pyon: Sean Kingston Publishing, 2015).
- "Describing Knowledge and Practice in Vanuatu’, in Hviding E. and K.M. Rio (eds.) Made in Oceania: Social Movements, Cultural Heritage and the State in the Pacific (Wantage: Sean Kingston Publishing, 2011) pp 301–319.
- ‘Framing the art of West Papua: an introduction’, in L. Bolton and N Stanley (eds.) The Asia Pacific Journal of Anthropology, (Special Issue: Framing the Art of West Papua) 12(4) (2011) pp. 317–326.
- ‘Los textiles y la vida’, in Mondragón, Carlos (ed.) Moana: Culturas de las Islas del Pacífico (Mexico City: Instituto Nacional de Antropología e Historia, 2010) pp. 67–72.
- ‘Explorers and Traders of South Papua’, in I. McCalman and N. Erskine (eds.) In the Wake of the Beagle: Science in the Southern Oceans from the Age of Darwin (Sydney: UNSW Press, 2009) pp. 108–123.
- ‘Living and Dying: Ethnography, class and aesthetics in the British Museum’, in D. Sherman (ed.) Museums and Difference (Bloomington: Indiana University Press, 2007) pp. 330–353.
- ‘Island dress that belongs to us all’: Mission dresses and the innovation of tradition in Vanuatu’ in E. Ewart and M. O’Hanlon (eds.) Body Arts and Modernity (Wantage: Sean Kingston Publishing, 2007) pp. 165–182.
- ‘Resourcing Change: Fieldworkers, the Women’s Culture Project and the Vanuatu Cultural Centre’, in N. Stanley (ed.) The Future of Indigenous Museums: Perspectives from the Southwest Pacific (Oxford: Berghahn Books, 2007) pp. 23–37.
- 'The museum as cultural agent: the Vanuatu Cultural Centre extension worker program', in C. Healy, and A. Witcomb (eds.) South Pacific Museums: Experiments in Culture (Melbourne: Monash University ePress, 2006).
- ‘Power of the gods’, British Museum Magazine, 56 (2006) pp. 24–27.
- 'Dressing for Transition: Weddings, Clothing and Change in Vanuatu', in S. Kuechler and G. Were (eds.), Pacific Clothing: the Art of Experience (London: UCL Press, 2005) pp. 19–32.
- The effect of objects: the return of a north Vanuatu textile from the Australian Museum to the Vanuatu Cultural Centre', in V.Attenbrow and R.Fullagar (eds) A Pacific Odyssey: Archaeology and Anthropology in the Western Pacific. Papers in Honour of Jim Specht Records of the Australian Museum, Supplement 29. (Sydney: Australian Museum, 2004) pp. 31–36.
- 'Living and Dying', British Museum Magazine, 47 (Winter 2003) pp. 34–37.
- 'Radio and the Redefinition of "Kastom" in Vanuatu' The Contemporary Pacific Vol. 11, No. 2 (Fall 1999), pp. 335–360
- (ed.), 'Fieldwork, fieldworkers: developments in Vanuatu research' Oceania, Special Issue 70(1) 1999.
- J. Weiner and L. Bolton (eds) "Multi-sited ethnography: investigations of a methodological proposal", Canberra Anthropology 22(2).
