= Linsey Pollak =

Australian musician and instrument maker

Linsey Pollak is an Australian musician, instrument maker, composer, musical director and community music facilitator.

Pollak studied classical clarinet until age 19. Then, at university, he started making and selling bamboo flutes. He dropped out in the second year of physiology to get more time to make instruments.

Pollak has recorded 31 albums. He toured his solo shows extensively in Europe, North America and Asia as well as performing at most major festivals around Australia. He has devised many large festival pieces such as 'BimBamBoo' and 'Sound Forest', as well as collaborating on many music and theatre projects around Australia. Pollak helped establish the now defunct 'Kulcha', The Multicultural Arts Centre of Western Australia, and has co-ordinated five cross-cultural music ensembles. He was also involved in groups such as Tansey's Fancy.

Pollak has also worked as a musical instrument maker for 40 years and has designed a number of new wind instruments. He has specialized in woodwind instruments from Eastern Europe such as the Macedonian gaida.

Pollak lives in Maleny, Queensland. He creates musical instruments from unlikely objects such as vegetables.

State Library of Queensland holds a collection of interviews, transcripts and radio shows on Pollak as part of their Linsey Pollack Oral History 2009 collection.

Pollak was awarded the Medal of the Order of Australia in the 2021 Queen's Birthday Honours, for "service to the performing arts, and to music".
