= Helena Teede =

Australian medical researcher

Helena Teede AM is an Australian clinician researcher. known for her contributions to women's health, health equity, and implementation science. She is the Director of the Monash Centre for Health Research and Implementation (MCHRI) at Monash University and a practising endocrinologist at Monash Health. Teede holds an NHMRC Fellowship and was appointed a Member of the Order of Australia in 2021 for her services to women's health and medical research.

Her research spans women's reproductive and metabolic health, including polyendocrine metabolic ovarian syndrome (PMOS), pregnancy and menopause.

== Affiliations and education ==
Teede graduated with a medical degree from Monash University in 1997 and trained as an Endocrinologist. She completed her PhD in medical research and an MBA in Leadership and Management. She is a Fellow of the Australian Academy of Health and Medical Sciences and Honorary Fellow of Royal Australian and New Zealand College of Obstetrics and Gynaecology (RANZCOG)

== Research and impact ==
She led the development of the International Evidence-Based Guideline for the Assessment and Management of Polycystic Ovary Syndrome (PCOS) in 2018 and 2023, funded by two NHMRC Centres of Research Excellence. Teede led a global initiative and changed the name of PCOS to Polyendocine Metabolic Ovarian Syndrome (PMOS) in May 2026. The name change is based on research published in The Lancet EClinicalMedicine, which found that the terminology PCOS may misrepresent the condition and delay diagnosis and care. After 22,000 survey responses, international workshops and working with 56 societies, new research was published in The Lancet and Nature Medicine. An implementation plan is currently underway and there is a 3 year transition to the new name.

== Roles ==
In addition to her academic roles, Teede has held other national leadership positions, including:

- Executive Director of Monash Partners Academic Health Sciences Centre (2015–2024)
- Council Member of the Australian Academy of Health and Medical Sciences (current)
- President of the International Society of Endocrinology (appointed 2025)
- Project Lead, Project Lead of the MRFF-funded Women's Health Research and Translation Impact Network (WHRTN), which has supported over 60 women's health research projects.

== Recognition ==
- Appointed Member of the Order of Australia (AM) in the 2021 Queen's Birthday Honours "for significant service to medical education and research, to endocrinology, and to women's health."
- International Research Engagement Award, Engagement Australia, 2023
- Honorary Fellowship of Royal College Obstetrics and Gynaecology UK 2023
- International Laureate Award for Outstanding Leadership in Endocrinology 2020 –US Endocrine Society
- Walter Futterweit Award international award for Excellence in Clinical Research in PCOS 2020
- National Australian Medical Association Women in Leadership 2024
- Engagement Australia Award for International reach in research and Translation 2023
- RANZCOG – Honorary Fellowship 2020
- Diabetes Australia annual award for the greatest contribution to diabetes 2018
- Fellow of the Australian Academy of Health and Medical Sciences 2017
