= Patrick Smith (journalist) =

Australian sports journalist (1952–2023)

Patrick Smith OAM (20 January 1952 – 12 November 2023) was an Australian sports journalist and Walkley award recipient. He was noted for long career writing for The Age and then The Australian newspapers' sports section.

Smith started his journalism career in 1972 with Melbourne's Sun as a copyboy, before moving to The Age in 1976. There he was promoted from sport subeditor to deputy sports editor, and then to sports editor, which he remained for six years.

In 1993, he was a senior columnist for The Age, leaving for The Australian in 2000.

Smith also appeared on Hungry for Sport with Kevin Bartlett on SEN 1116. He wrote pieces on political issues in sport, including the internal workings of Australian rules football, Cricket and Athletics Australia.

Smith won Walkley awards for his commentary and analysis of sport in 1997, 2002 and 2004.

In 2001 and 2002, Smith won "Most Outstanding Columnist" at the AFL Media Awards. In 2009, he was awarded a High Commendation in the competition for the Graham Perkin Australian Journalist of the Year Award.

Smith was awarded the Medal of the Order of Australia in the 2021 Queen's Birthday Honours for "service to the print media as a journalist".

Patrick Smith died suddenly on 12 November 2023, at the age of 71.
