= Ute Roessner =

Metabolomics

Ute Roessner AM FAA
- Education: University of Potsdam, Max Planck Institute of Molecular Plant Physiology
- Employer: Australian Research Council
- Known for: Plant metabolomics
- Title: Professor

Ute Roessner AM FAA is a biochemist who specialises in plant metabolomics. Until 2022, she was professor and head of the School of Biosciences at the University of Melbourne. In 2022, she joined Australian National University as pro-vice-chancellor. She was appointed CEO of the Australian Research Council from 31 March 2025 for a five-year term.

== Early life and education ==
Ute Roessner received a diploma in biochemistry from the University of Potsdam in Potsdam, Germany, and the John Innes Institute in Norwich, England.

She then was awarded a PhD in plant biochemistry from the Max Planck Institute of Molecular Plant Physiology, also in Potsdam.

== Career ==
Roessner's career involves conducting work in metabolomics, biochemistry, and lipidomics, as well as mass spectrometry. Roessner played a role in establishing a metabolomics platform research in 2003, within the Australian Centre for Plant Functional Genomics, and also in 2007, in Metabolomics Australia.

Roessner's research has received media attention, from her early life in East Berlin, regarding the Berlin Wall coming down, as well as a Nature paper on the genome of Chenopodium quinoa and research on insecticides, showing low doses of insecticides can reduce insect survival rates. Roessner was also involved in research on how invasive fungal diseases, which can be life-threatening, can be able to adapt and then survive within human populations.

Roessner's research has involved using mass spectrometry to understand spatial metabolite and the analysis of lipids, to further understanding of the metabolism of roots under saline stress. Roessner has been awarded funding for mass spectrometry research on lipids, metabolites and proteins in plants.

She was head of school, Biosciences at the University of Melbourne, between 2018 and 2022.

In 2022, she was appointed pro-vice-chancellor of the Australian National University in Canberra.

In January 2025 it was announced that Roessner had been appointed CEO of the Australian Research Council for a five-year term, commencing on 31 March 2025.

== Recognition and awards ==
In 2021 Roessner was appointed a Member of the Order of Australia the Queen's Birthday Honours for "significant service to tertiary education, particularly to the biosciences".

She was inducted onto the Victorian Honour Roll of Women as a Trailblazer in 2020 and elected a Fellow of the Australian Academy of Science in 2022.

Awards and honours
Year	Award
2013	Australian Research Council Future Fellow
2020	Victorian Honour Roll of Women
2021	Member of the Order of Australia
2022	Fellow of the Australian Academy of Science
2023	ANZSMS Morrison Medal
