= Peter Ivany =

Australian entrepreneur (born 1954)

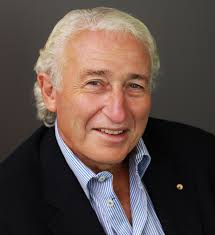

Peter Alexander Ivany AO (born 1954) is an Australian entrepreneur. He currently runs Ivany Investment Group and is the former CEO of Hoyts (1988–1999).

== Biography ==
Peter Ivany was born in Melbourne, Australia in 1954. As Chief Executive of Hoyts Cinemas (1988–1999), Ivany grew the company to a global business with over 2,000 theatres operating in 12 countries. In 1999, he sold the business to Kerry Packer's Consolidated Press group.

Ivany is the Chairman of the Life Governors Advisory Council of the Jewish Communal Appeal (JCA), Chairman of the Sydney Swans Foundation, and Chairman of the National Institute of Dramatic Arts (NIDA) Foundation Trust,

Peter is a board member of the Sydney Cricket Ground Heritage Trust, Sydney Swans Limited, NIDA, The Sydney Zoo, The Sydney Zoo Foundation and Allied Credit. He is also a member of The Advisory Council for the Sydney Film Festival and is an adjunct professor for the Faculty of Business at the University of Technology Sydney.

He has previously been involved as a board member of the Sydney Cricket Ground Trust, the Jewish Film Festival, the Sydney Film Festival, the Museum of Contemporary Art, and the President's Council of the Art Gallery of New South Wales. Ivany was also the chairman of the council that governs the Australian Film, Television and Radio School. In June 2018, Peter Ivany and Sharon Ivany announced a gift of one million dollars to Museum of Contemporary Art Australia (MCA) to invest in sustaining future programming.

He is currently chairman and CEO of his own diversified investment company, Ivany Investment Group (IIG).

== Awards ==
On Australia Day 2007, Ivany was appointed as a Member of the Order of Australia for "service to the community through a range of fundraising, Jewish, arts and sporting organisations, to medical research and public health, and to business education". In the 2021 Queen's Birthday Honours he was promoted to Officer of the Order of Australia for "distinguished service to the community as a supporter of sporting, arts, film, not-for-profit, and natural science organisations".
