= Faye McMillan =

Australian academic, allied health researcher and pharmacist

Faye McMillan AM
- Born: Faye Beverley McMillan; 24 March 1971 (age 54); Bowral, New South Wales, Australia

Academic background
- Education: Charles Sturt University (PharmB)

Academic work
- Discipline: Pharmacy
- Sub-discipline: Indigenous healthcare

Faye Beverley McMillan AM (born 24 March 1971) is an Australian academic and pharmacist known for her work on improving Indigenous healthcare. In 2023 she was awarded the Australian Harkness Fellowship in Health Care Policy and Practice. She is a Senior Atlantic Fellow for Social Equity (Atlantic Institute), as well as being a Senior Fellow with Advance HE. She is a founding member of Indigenous Allied Health Australia (IAHA) and was a board member of IAHA from 2009-2017 (and chairperson from 2010-2016). She joined UTS in 2022 with over 20 years of experience in the Higher Education Sector and over 30 years in the health sector.

== Early life, education, and qualifications ==
McMillan is Wiradjuri and was born in Bowral, New South Wales. She grew up in Trangie, New South Wales. She graduated from Charles Sturt University with a Bachelor of Pharmacy in 2001, and completed her pre-registration year at Wagga Wagga.

- 2022 Master of Social Change and Leadership – University of Melbourne
- 2020 Diploma of Counselling
- 2020 Cert IV Training and Assessment
- 2019 Senior Fellow, Advance Higher Education (SFHEA)
- 2018 Graduate Certificate in Education – University of Melbourne
- 2016 Doctor of Health Science – Exegesis: Shared meanings of leadership through accounts of the experiences of Indigenous/First Nations women leaders" Charles Sturt University
- 2016 Graduate Certificate in Wiradjuri Language, Culture and Heritage – Charles Sturt University
- 2014 Graduate Certificate in Indigenous Governance – University of Arizona
- 2013 Cert I and II – Wiradjuri Language
- 2006 Master of Indigenous Health Studies – University of Wollongong
- 2001 Bachelor of Pharmacy – Charles Sturt University.

Fellowships Harkness Fellow: The Commonwealth Fund Faye McMillan Lifelong Atlantic Fellow for Social Equity Associate Professor Faye McMillan AM Senior Fellow of Advance HE Fellow of the Pharmaceutical Society of Australia

== Career ==
McMillan is known for having been Australia's first registered Aboriginal pharmacist. She has worked on the Tiwi Islands and in Vancouver, Canada. She is an Atlantic Fellow, focusing her work on supporting mental health, and a founding member and former chairperson of Indigenous Allied Health Australia. McMillan works at University Technology Sydney and works between Sydney and Wagga Wagga – Professor of Indigenous Health previous to this role McMillan worked at the University of New South Wales and prior to that as Associate Professor in the School of Nursing, Midwifery and Indigenous Health at Charles Sturt University.

McMillan is currently one of two Deputy National Rural Health Commissioners within the Office of the National Rural Health Commissioner.

In 2019, McMillan was appointed director of The Australian Pharmacy Council board. In 2022 APC launched The Leaders in Indigenous Pharmacy Profession Education (LIPPE) Network.

== Awards ==
- McMillan was named in the Westpac and Australian Financial Review 100 Women of Influence Awards in 2014.
- She was named 2019 New South Wales Aboriginal Woman of the Year.
- In the 2021 Queen's Birthday Honours, McMillan was appointed a Member of the Order of Australia for "significant service to Indigenous mental health, and to tertiary education".
- In 2022 McMillan was named as the Pharmacist of the Year at PSA’s Excellence Awards, presented at PSA22 New beginnings for PSA's Pharmacist of the Year
- In 2023 McMillan was made a Fellow of the Pharmaceutical Society of Australia PSA23 Honors Newly Inducted Fellows
- In 2023 McMillan was awarded the 2023 Alumni Award for Professional Excellence from the University of Wollongong Winners – University of Wollongong – UOW

== Selected publications ==
- F McMillan, D Kampers, V Traynor, J Dewing; (2010) Person-centred care as caring for country: An indigenous Australia Experience; Dementia, 9 , (2): 163-167.Person-centred care as caring for country: An Indigenous Australian experience
- C. Schultz, R. Walker, D. Bessarab, F. McMillan, J. MacLeod, R. Marriott (2014) Chapter 13: Interdisciplinary Care to Enhance Mental Health and Social Emotional Wellbeing.
- Y. Akama, D. Evans, S. Keen, F. McMillan, M McMillan, P. West; (2017) Designing digital and creative scaffolds to strengthen Indigenous nations: being Wiradjuri by practising sovereignty; Digital Creativity, 28 , (1): 58-72.Person-centred care as caring for country: An Indigenous Australian experience Doi: Designing digital and creative scaffolds to strengthen Indigenous nations: being Wiradjuri by practising sovereignty
- M. McMillan, F. McMillan, S. Rigney; (2016) Is indigenous National Building capable of strengthening and improving Indigenous holistic health outcomes: Retelling the right to health 10 , (2): 147-159.Is Indigenous Nation Building capable of strengthening and improving Indigenous holistic health outcomes: Retelling the Right to Health
