= Michael Henderson (doctor) =

Australian public health doctors (born 1937)

Michael Henderson AO (born 1937) is a physician who has made contributions to motor vehicle safety. After moving from the United Kingdom to Australia, Henderson headed the new Traffic Accident Research Unit in the Department of Motor Transport in New South Wales. He wrote an early book on safety in motor racing and was involved in the design of a Pininfarina racing car built with the intent of increasing safety.

== Biography ==
Henderson was born in 1937 in Woking, England and graduated from Cambridge and St Thomas' Hospital. Henderson's career in safety began with his work in aviation research with the Royal Air Force. In 1968 he released a seminal book, Safety in Motor Racing. Henderson's book was influenced by his race medical experience and his accumulation of racing statistics. In 1969, Henderson was part of a team of experts that worked with Pininfarina and Automobil Revue to design a safe racing car known as the Sigma Grand Prix. Tony Davis of Drive.com.au said that the Sigma "was almost certainly the first racing car to take safety seriously."

By 1970, he had moved to Australia and became head of the newly formed Traffic Accident Research Unit of the Department of Motor Transport of the NSW government. He became interested in the application of compulsory seat belt laws. He contrasted the acceptance of such laws by Australian citizens with the resistance encountered to such laws in the U.S. and Europe. Henderson pointed out that seat belt use sometimes created a paradox: a driver using a seat belt might indicate that he or she was not a confident driver, while a passenger might offend a driver by putting on a seatbelt.

While at the research unit during the 1970s he led a modern scientific approach to (road) motor vehicle safety, with sections of the unit covering human factors, statistical data analysis, engineering research, and traffic engineering. He was instrumental in introducing enforced fitment and use of seatbelts in Australia, improvements in child restraints and motorcycle helmets, introduction of helmets for bicycle riders, and steps which helped change the attitudes of the public to drink driving, so that there was a reduction, particularly in NSW, in trauma and death, and which began a continuous reduction which continued for decades in NSW.

In the mid-1990s, Henderson authored a large study of child restraint system performance in actual car crashes. He also wrote a 1995 review of head injury prevention with bicycle helmets. His later career moved back toward an emphasis on safety in motor racing, so that in 2004 he was awarded Life Membership of the Confederation of Australian Motor Sport. In 2007 he became the inaugural Chairman of the newly formed Australian Institute for Motor Sport Safety, and is now on the Board, and is Chairman of their Research Advisory Group.

Henderson was made a Fellow of the FIA Institute for Motor Sport Safety. He is a Fellow of the Association for the Advancement of Automotive Medicine (AAAM), and a member of the Australian Trauma Society and the Society of Automotive Engineers.

Even though there have been changes in the way it is administered, the essentials of the approach to road vehicle safety initiated by Henderson are now incorporated in the Centre for Road Safety of the Roads & Maritime Services of the NSW Government, and which includes an expansion of the testing laboratory of the Engineering Research Section originally at Rosebery, now in Huntingwood (now called Crashlab) which conducts full-scale vehicle crash testing, and testing of helmets, adult and child and baby restraints, and safety work harnesses.

Henderson was appointed an Officer of the Order of Australia in the 2021 Queen's Birthday Honours, recognising his "distinguished service to motor vehicle and motorsport safety, and to the prevention of road trauma".
