= Reg Chard =

Australian World War II veteran (1923–2026)

- Born: Reginald James Chard; 31 October 1923
- Died: 24 July 2026 (aged 102)
- Occupation: Soldier
- Years active: 1941–1943
- Known for: Last surviving Australian veteran of the Kokoda Track campaign
- Awards: Order of Australia

Reginald James Chard (31 October 1923 – 24 July 2026) was an Australian soldier who served in the Kokoda Track campaign in New Guinea during World War II. He joined the military in 1941, aged 18, and fought from 1942 until 1943. Chard was the last surviving veteran of the Kokoda Track campaign, and was awarded the Order of Australia in 2021.

== Early life ==
Chard was born on 31 October 1923. He grew up in Marrickville, in western Sydney, alongside five brothers and four sisters. In his teenage years he became an apprentice baker, and began dating a girl named Betty.

== Military service ==
Chard joined the military at the age of 18. His initial application on 17 November 1941 was rejected due to his job as a baker. He worked in a store for a week, and was accepted upon his next application.

Following a fitness test consisting of a 50-mile (80 km) walk, Chard was transported to Brisbane, and from there to Townsville, where he boarded a ship without knowing its destination. Chard was sent to Port Moresby, two and a half months after joining the military. He took a camera on this voyage, against orders. One of his shipmates was war photographer Damien Parer, who died during the subsequent campaign. Chard initially served in the 2/33rd Battalion. He later served with the 55th/53rd Battalion.

Chard's first assignment in New Guinea was as part of the Australian and American forces constructing airstrips at Milne Bay. After being shipped back to Port Moresby, he was sent to reinforce forces battling in the Kokoda Track campaign, serving under General Arthur Allen. After catching malaria, Chard was taken for medical treatment before being sent back to the jungle. He fought in the critical Battle of Ioribaiwa. During the campaign, Chard recalled that Japanese soldiers would speak English to lure Australian forces into traps. Australian forces responded by asking the voices if they lived in Woolloomooloo, as Japanese soldiers were unable to pronounce that name. He stated that he was one of 13 Australian soldiers to discover female prisoners who had been mutilated and killed by Japanese forces, and agreed to keep the women's identities a secret to hide this fate from their families.

He later fought at the coastal village of Sanananda, where he saw two close friends killed by Japanese sniper fire. He caught both malaria and scrub typhus towards the end of the campaign, and "collapsed" on 21 January 1943, a day before Japanese defeat at Buna–Gona. He credited his survival to the Fuzzy Wuzzy Angels.

Chard returned to Sydney on the SS Katoomba, and was treated at the Concord Repatriation General Hospital. His time at war had reduced him from 10 stone 9 pounds (149 lb; 68 kg) to 6 stone 5 pounds (89 lb; 40 kg). He later returned to service, but due to the continuing impact of malaria he was discharged without being sent back to war.

== Later life and death ==
Chard was offered a new job at the same bakery, but declined, fearing rashes and scabs on his legs would drive away customers. He later took up work operating a blast furnace. At the age of 21, he opened a trucking business with his brother-in-law. Chard continued driving trucks for 38 years.

Chard and Betty were married on 6 October 1945. Betty died of cancer in 2011 at the Concord Repatriation General Hospital, after a marriage of 66 years.

In 2000, he began to give tours at Sydney's Kokoda Track Memorial Walkway. As part of the 2021 Queen's Birthday Honours, Chard was awarded the Order of Australia for "service to military history, and to veterans". In 2022, the 80th anniversary of the Kokoda Campaign, Chard released an official memoir entitled The Digger of Kokoda, authored by Daniel Lane. It was reported that he still felt survivor guilt.

Chard died on 24 July 2026, at the age of 102. He was the last surviving veteran of the Kokoda Track campaign.
