= Astrid Perry-Indermaur =

Australian activist

Astrid Perry-Indermaur OAM
- Education: Western Sydney University (PhD)
- Occupations: activist, non-profit executive
- Relatives: In der Maur (family)
- Awards: Medal of the Order of Australia

Astrid Perry-Indermaur is an Australian women's activist and advocate for migrant communities. She serves as the Head of Women, Equity, and Domestic and Family Violence for Settlement Services International. Perry-Indermaur was awarded the Medal of the Order of Australia during the 2021 Queen's Birthday Honours.

== Biography ==
Perry-Indermaur is from Carlton, New South Wales. She graduated with a doctorate from Western Sydney University in 2004. Her thesis was "Regimes of truth : gender, achievement and parent participation in New South Wales public schools".

Perry-Indermaur is an advocate for migrant communities and for women in Australia. She served as Secretary for the Immigrant Women's Speakout Association Of New South Wales Inc. Perry-Indermaur also served as the Head of Women, Equity & Domestic and Family Violence for the Australian non-profit organization Settlement Services International.

Perry-Indermaur was awarded the Medal of the Order of Australia for "service to the community through migrant and women's organisations" during the 2021 Queen's Birthday Honours.

On 31 January 2023, Perry-Indermaur spoke before the Parliament of Australia as a representative of Settlement Services International.

In 2025, she was awarded the Multicultural NSW Lifetime Community Service Medal.
