= Alan Manly =

Australian author and computer engineer (born 1950)

Alan Manly OAM
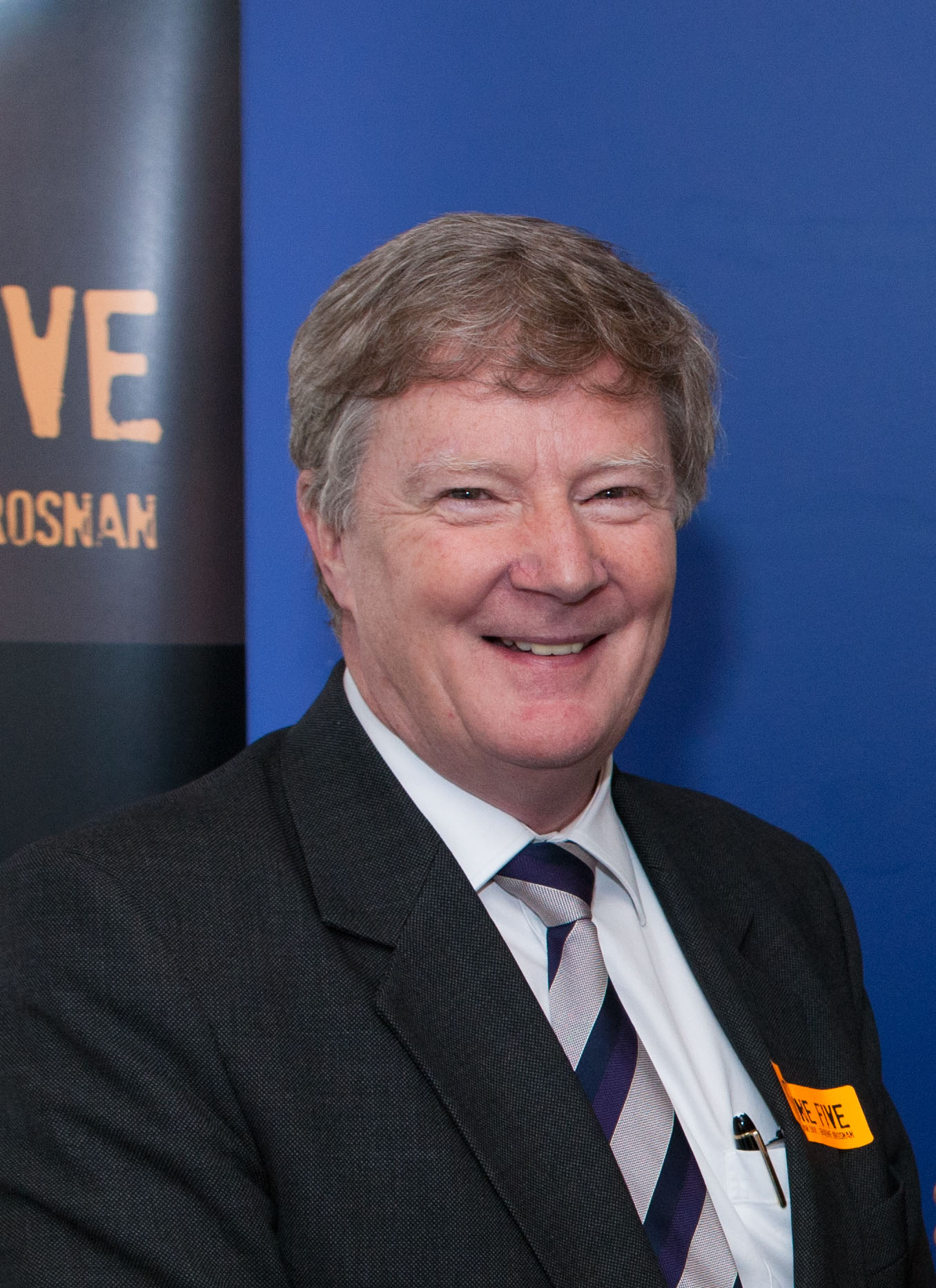
- Born: Alan Manly
- Writing career
- Notable works: The Unlikely Entrepreneur; When There Are Too Many Lawyers...There Is No Justice

Alan Philip James Manly OAM (born 1950) is an Australian entrepreneur, company director and published author.

== Career ==
After dropping out of year nine at Bacchus Marsh High School in the north-west of Victoria, Australia, Alan worked as a postman before securing an apprenticeship as a television repairman. For eight years, Alan worked at Digital Equipment Corporation first as a computer technician, then in sales and marketing.

Alan commenced his entrepreneurial career as a founding Director of a software company that developed and sold computerised freight tracking and integrated management systems used by major independent freight companies.

Alan then moved into the education industry, delivering papers on trading educational services in China and India. He is a former director of the Australian Council of Private Education and Training, the industry association that then represented private colleges in Australia. He represented the industry before the Australian Senate supporting the introduction of government supervised trust accounts for student funds. In 2013 he joined the board of the Council of Private Higher Education, a national industry body representing independent Higher Education Providers.

He was the managing director of Group Colleges Australia (GCA), from 1999 to 2023, a company that has raised public and private funding to develop distance education using the Internet. GCA was amongst the first private colleges in Australia to implement distance learning via the Internet to overseas students. When GCA moved its campus to the former iconic TNT Towers in Lawson Square, Redfern in 2008, Alan stated his support for revitalising Redfern into "a modern cosmopolitan suburb." The renamed GCA towers dominate the local area.

In 2017, GCA moved all its colleges into the Sydney CBD. The Higher Education division, Universal Business School Sydney (UBSS) was re-established in a modern CBD campus at 233 Castlereagh Street, Sydney. Coinciding with this move Alan released his book "The Unlikely Entrepreneur".

Alan divested his interests in GCA in May 2023. He continued his association with CampusQ as board chair and CEO. (www.campusq.com.au)

Alan received a Tourism Training Australia award in 2009 for "outstanding support and leadership in tourism and hospitality in Australia." In 2010, Alan was interviewed in BRW Magazine on Australia's education sector. In 2016 Alan was interviewed by CEO magazine.

Alan was appointed by Minister Hawke to the Ministerial Advisory Council on Skilled Migration in February 2021

In 2021 Alan was honoured in the Queen's Birthday Honours with the Medal of the Order of Australia (OAM) for "service to tertiary education"

Alan has been active in the media with interviews and has published extensively (see www.alanmanly.com.au ) on the topic of entrepreneurship.

He is a Fellow of the Australian Institute of Company Directors, and a Justice of the Peace.

== Published works ==
- 另类创业家 'The Unlikely Entrepreneur' (Chinese Version) (2018), by 艾伦·曼利 (Alan Manly)
- 'The Unlikely Entrepreneur' (2017), by Alan Manly
- 'When There Are Too Many Lawyers' (2013 second edition, published 1 November 2013), by Alan Manly
- 'One One Five' (2011), co-authored with Julian R Day and Graeme Brosnan.

== Book reviews ==
- A case of deception by numbers, by Andrew Clarke – The Weekend Financial Review (4–5 February 2012)
- Spear carriers in a production of Aida, by David Ash – Law Society Journal (November 2011)
- It's A Crazy, Crazy Story, by Jacq Ellem – Hit the Road Jacq (18 October 2011)
- How $115 led to 200 court appearances, by Jonar Nader – Observations from the Front Line (August 2011)
- When There Are Too Many Lawyers...There Is No Justice, The Senior (March 2014)
- Author's Legal Minefield, Hills Shire Times (April 2014)
- The Unlikely Entrepreneur - PSNews (June 2017)
- Alan Manly tells how a fraudulent $115 invoice cost him more than $200,000 - News.com.au (October 2014)
- When There Are Too Many Lawyers, There Is No Justice - Femail.com.au
