= John Connell (geographer) =

British-Australian geographer

- Born: 1946 (age 79–80); London, England
- Education: University of Leeds, University College London
- Occupations: Geographer, Academic
- Years active: 1970–present
- Employer(s): University of Sydney, Australia
- Known for: Research in rural and urban geography, Pacific Studies, cultural geography, migration, geopolitics
- Title: Emeritus Professor of Geography at the University of Sydney

John H. Connell (born 1946) is a British and Australian geographer. He was a professor at the University of Sydney.

Connell studied Geography at University of Leeds with research in Bermuda.

== Background ==
He completed his PhD in Geography at University College, London in 1973 on rural change in Surrey villages (Connell 1978). He worked at the Institute of Development Studies at Sussex University from 1970-73. He then joined the Research School of Pacific Studies, ANU, in Canberra, researching the Siwai people of Bougainville in Papua New Guinea. In 1977 he joined the University of Sydney as lecturer in Geography, retiring as Professor when in his mid-60s. he has continued research and writing post-retirement. From 1981-84 he also worked at the South Pacific Commission in Noumea.

== Key contributions ==
Connell has written 36 books and numerous articles. He began making contributions to rural geography and migration in England as a student and research assistant, before travelling widely and then relocation to Oceania and studying development processes and urban and rural life in smaller and remote island societies. Local fieldwork was notably in Bougainville, Vanuatu, New Caledonia, Solomon Islands, Tonga, Fiji, Tuvalu and across Papua New Guinea. Other detailed works have dealt with cultural change, agrarian studies, exchange, and island migration and remittances to islands from healthcare and other work. With the historian Robert Aldrich he wtote several volumes on French colonialism and European colonial outposts, the latest in 2020, and he wrote a monograph on the tense politics and ethnic nationalism of New Caledonia and its mining economy in 1986.

His later work has dealt with how tourism (including medical tourism) can work for the poor, and cultural geography as expressed through literature, music (notably in New South Wales and its festivals), and sport. His work on international migration streams is widely cited.

== Awards and recognition ==
- Fellow of the Academy of the Social Sciences in Australia (2001)
- NSW Geographical Society’s McDonald Holmes Medal (2007)
- Australia International Medal, Institute of Australian Geographers (2009)
- Member of the Order of Australia (2021)

== Books ==
- Connell, J. Dasgupta, B., Laishley R, Lipton, M. (1976). Migration from rural areas: The evidence from village studies. IDS/Oxford University Press.
- Connell, J., & Lipton, M. (1977). Assessing village labour situations in developing countries. Oxford University Press.
- Connell, J. (1978). The end of tradition: Country life in central Surrey. Available as Routledge Revivals imprint.
- Connell, J. (1978). Taim bilong mani: The evolution of agriculture in a Solomon Island society. ANU Development Studies Centre Monograph 12. https://openresearch-repository.anu.edu.au/server/api/core/bitstreams/426c363a-d4d4-4118-b858-0d8763572ca4/content
- Connell, J. (1980). Remittances and rural development: Migration, dependency, and inequality in the South Pacific. Australian National University Occasional Paper 22.
- Connell, J. (1986). New Caledonia or Kanaky? The political history of a French colony. Research School of Pacific Studies, The Australian National University. http://hdl.handle.net/1885/132702
- Spencer, M., Ward, A., & Connell, J. (eds.)(1988). New Caledonia: essays on nationalism and dependence. University of Queensland Press.
- Aldrich, R. & Connell, J. (1989). France in world politics. Routledge Revivals.
- Spencer, M., Ward, A., & Connell, J. (eds.)(1989). Nouvelle-Calédonie: essais sur le nationalisme et la dépendance. L'Harmattan.
- Connell, J., & Howitt, R. (Eds.). (1991). Mining and indigenous peoples in Australasia. Sydney University Press in association with Oxford University Press.
- Connell, J., & King, R. and White, P (Eds.).(1995) Writing Across Worlds. Literature and Migration. Routledge.
- Howitt, R., Connell, J. & Hirsch, P. (eds.) (1996). Resources, Nations and Indigenous Peoples: Case Studies from Australasia, Melanesia and Southeast Asia. Oxford University Press.
- Connell, J (1997). Papua New Guinea: The Struggle for Development. Routledge.
- Aldrich, R. & Connell, J. (1998) The Last Colonies. Cambridge University Press. https://doi.org/10.1017/CBO9780511598920
- Connell, J. & King, R. (eds.) (1999) Small Worlds, Global Lives: Islands and migration. Pinter.
- Connell, J., & Conway, D. (1999). Migration and remittances in island microstates: A comparative perspective on the South Pacific and the Caribbean. Oxford University Press.
- Connell, J. (2000). Sydney: The emergence of a world city. Oxford University Press.
- Connell, J., Lea, J. (2002). Urbanisation in the Island Pacific: Towards Sustainable Development. Routledge.
- Connell, J., & Gibson, C. (2003). Sound tracks: Popular music, identity, and place. Routledge.
- Connell, J., & Gibson, C. (2005). Music and tourism: On the road again. Channel View Publications.
- Connell, J., Brown, R. (2005). Remittances in the Pacific: An overview. Woodhead Publishing.
- Connell, J., & Waddell, E. (Eds.). (2006). Environment, development and change in rural Asia-Pacific: Between local and global. Routledge.
- Connell, J., & Rugendyke, B. (Eds.). (2007). Tourism at the grassroots: Villagers and visitors in the Asia Pacific. Routledge.
- Connell, J. (2008). The global health care chain: From the Pacific to the world. Routledge.
- Connell, J. (ed.) (2008). The international migration of health workers. Routledge.
- Connell, J. (2010). Migration and the Globalisation of Health Care: The Health Worker Exodus?. Edward Elgar.
- Connell, J. (2011). Medical Tourism. CABI Publishing.
- Connell, J. & McManus, P. (2011). Rural revival? Place marketing, tree change and regional migration in Australia. Ashgate.
- Connell, J., & Gibson, C. (2011). Festival places: Revitalising rural Australia. Channel View Publications.
- Connell, J., & Gibson, C. (2012). Music festivals and regional development in Australia. Ashgate.
- Connell, J. (2013). Islands at risk? Environments, economies and contemporary change. Edward Elgar Publishing.
- Dufty-Jones, R., Connell, J. (2016). Rural Change in Australia: Population, Economy, Environment. Ashgate.
- Connell, J. & Gibson, C. (2017). Outback Elvis.The story Of a festival, its fans & a town called Parkes. New South Publishing.
- Connell, J., & Lee, H. (Eds.). (2018). Change and continuity in the Pacific: Revisiting the region. Routledge.
- Connell, J & Petrou, K. (2019). Pacific Labour Mobility: Towards a future research agenda. The University of Sydney https://www.palmscheme.gov.au/sites/default/files/2022-04/CONNELL%20and%20PETROU%202019%20Pacific%20labour%20mobility%20-%20towards%20a%20future%20research%20agenda.pdf
- Connell, J. & Aldrich, R. (2020). The Ends of Empire: The last colonies revisited. Palgrave.
- Connell J., Lowitt, K. (2020). Food security in Small Island States. Springer. https://doi.org/10.1007/978-981-13-8256-7
- Cambell, Y. & Connell, J. (2021). COVID in the Islands: A comparative perspective on the Caribbean and the Pacific. Palgrave. https://doi.org/10.1007/978-981-16-5285-1
- Petrou, K. & Connell, J. (2023). Pacific Islands Guestworkers in Australia: The new blackbirds? Palgrave.
- Connell J., McManus P., Ding, X. (2024). Chinese Tourism in Australia: Koalas, selfies and red dresses. Palgrave. https://doi.org/10.1007/978-981-97-2477-2
- John Connell & Yonique Campbell. (2026). Island Challenges: Caribbean and Pacific Futures. Palgrave Macmillan. https://doi.org/10.1007/978-981-95-8177-1
