= Colin Binns =

Australian public health specialist

Colin Binns AO

Academic background
- Education: MD, University of Western Australia; MPH, Harvard University
- Website: profcolinbinns.com

Colin William Binns AO is an Australian public health specialist. He is the John Curtin Distinguished Emeritus Professor at Curtin University and founder of the Curtin Health Service.

== Early life and education ==
Binns completed his medical degree at the University of Western Australia and worked for several years in hospitals in Perth before moving to Papua New Guinea for eight years. While working as a doctor in Papua New Guinea, Binns received a scholarship to complete a MPH degree at Harvard University.

== Career ==
Following his MPH, Binns returned to Australia and accepted a faculty position at Curtin University. During his tenure at the institution, Binns founded the Curtin Health Service and was appointed the Head of the School of Public Health. In these roles, Binns also established the National Centre for Research into the Prevention of Drug Abuse and the Centre for Health Promotion Research. As such, he was awarded the 2010 Research Australia Lifetime Achievement Award in recognition of the "support he has given to health policy, practice and medical research." The following year, Binns was appointed a John Curtin Distinguished Professor, the highest honours the university can award its academic staff. As a result of his public health work, Binns was honoured as an Officer of the Order of Australia in 2021.
