= Vanessa Guthrie =

Australian businesswoman (born 1961)

Vanessa Ann Guthrie AO (born 24 January 1961) is an Australian businesswoman, known for her work as a company director in the resources sector, including three years as chair of the Minerals Council of Australia. In 2017 she was appointed to the board of the Australian Broadcasting Corporation by then prime minister Malcolm Turnbull. She was elected Chancellor of Curtin University in 2024.

== Career ==
Guthrie was CEO and director of Toro Energy Ltd., head of sustainable development at Alcoa World Alumina & Chemicals, and vice president of sustainable development at Woodside Energy before accepting a number of board roles.

Guthrie joined the board of the Minerals Council of Australia in 2014 and became chair in 2016, completing her three-year term in June 2019. Helen Coonan replaced her as chair.

Guthrie was appointed non-executive director of the Australian Broadcasting Corporation for a five-year term commencing 23 February 2017; she resigned in March 2021. She has been a non-executive director of Santos Limited since 1 July 2017, of Adelaide Brighton Ltd since February 2018, of Tronox Holdings PLC since March 2019. In March 2019 Guthrie became a member of the Australia-India Council for a five-year term.

Guthrie has been deputy chair of the Western Australian Cricket Association since February 2016. She was co-opted to the Council of Curtin University for a three-year term from 1 April 2017. She has remained on Council since then and in April 2024 became Chancellor of the university.

== Awards and recognition ==
- Fellow, Australian Academy of Technological Sciences and Engineering, 2015
- Honorary Doctor of Science, Curtin University, 2017
- Officer of the Order of Australia, Queen's Birthday Honours, 2021
