= Erika Feller =

Australian academic, diplomat and lawyer

Erika Elizabeth Feller AO (born 1949) is an Australian academic, diplomat and lawyer. From 2006 to 2013, she was Assistant High Commissioner for Protection with the United Nations High Commissioner for Refugees. She is currently the Vice-Chancellor's Fellow at the University of Melbourne.
