= John Bennett (educator) =

Australian educator

Professor John Bennett AM
- Born: John Leslie Bennett; 25 October 1948 (age 78)
- Education: B.Math, B.Ed.Stud., M.Ed., Ph.D.
- Alma mater: University of Newcastle; University of New South Wales
- Occupation: Education administrator
- Years active: 1968 – present
- Title: Chief Executive, Office of the Board of Studies
- Term: 2002 – 2009
- Predecessor: John Ward
- Successor: Carol Taylor
- Awards: Wyndham Medal
- Website: www.johnbennett.com.au

John Leslie Bennett AM (born 25 October 1948) is an Australian educator. He is Conjoint Professor of Education at the University of New South Wales. Bennett was Chief Executive of the Office of the Board of Studies (OBOS) from 2002 to 2009.

Bennett began his career as a teacher of mathematics at Maitland Boys' High School in 1968. He was appointed as Head of Mathematics at Dover Heights Girls' High School in 1978. From 1986 Bennett held a variety of positions in assessment and information services with OBOS and its precursor. He was appointed General Manager (Chief Executive) in December 2002.

During his term as Chief Executive, Bennett oversaw the implementation of significant changes to the Higher School Certificate, including standards-referenced assessment and reporting, onscreen marking of examinations, a mandatory course in academic integrity and the release of HSC results by SMS.

In 2009 Bennett was awarded the Wyndham Medal by the Australian College of Educators for his leadership and intellectual contribution.

In 2021, Bennett was made a Member of the Order of Australia.

== Publications ==
- Bennett, John (2009). Country Case Study: Australia (New South Wales). Secondary School External Examination Systems: Reliability, Robustness and Resilience. pp. 55–80. ISBN 978-1-60497-600-7.
- Bennett, John (1999). Setting Standards and Applying Them across Different Administrations of Large-scale, High-stakes, Curriculum-based Public Examinations. Board of Studies NSW. ISBN 0-7313-4163-5.
- Bennett, John (1998). A procedure for equating curriculum-based public examinations using professional judgement informed by the psychometric analysis of response data and student scripts. Thesis (Ph. D.) – University of New South Wales, 1995.
- Bennett, John; Melick, Robin; Osland, Peter; Rossi, Adele (1985). Community Mathematics. Dominie. ISBN 0-86799-312-X.
- Coroneos, James; Bourne, Marion; Bennett, John (1980). A Higher school certificate course in mathematics : 2 unit, maths in society. Coroneos Publishing Company. ISBN 1-86294-011-8.
