= Carol Pollock =

Australian nephrologist and medical researcher

Professor Carol Pollock AO FAHMS
- Awards: Vice Chancellors Award for Excellence in Research Supervision (2012) Ministerial Award for Excellence in Cardiovascular Research (2014) Officer (AO) of the Order of Australia (2021) Alfred Newton Richards award for outstanding research in the field of nephrology (2023)
- Scientific career
- Fields: Kidney health
- Workplaces: Clinical Professor of Medicine, University of Sydney

Carol Pollock is an Australian medical researcher specialising in kidney health and disease. She is a Clinical Professor of Medicine at the University of Sydney, Northern Clinical School, Kolling Institute of Medical Research. Her research interests also include obesity, diabetes, cardiovascular disease, healthy ageing and lifespan, employing animal models and cellular and molecular techniques. She is the Chair of Kidney Health Australia and was the Chair of Medicine Royal North Shore Hospital in 2011 to 2016.

== Awards and recognition ==
Pollock was awarded the Officer of the Order of Australia on 14 June 2021 for 'distinguished service to medical research, education and science, to nephrology, and to clinical practice and governance.'

In 2015, she was elected as a fellow of Australian Academy of Health and Medical Sciences.

== Selected publications ==
- Koshino, A., Mahaffey, K., Pollock, C., Hansen, M., Wada, T., Heerspink, H., Neuen, B., Oshima, M., Toyama, T., Hara, A., Jardine, M., et al (2024). Autoantibodies to Erythropoietin Receptor and Clinical Outcomes in Patients With Type 2 Diabetes and CKD: A Post Hoc Analysis of CREDENCE Trial. Kidney International Reports, 9(2), 347-355.
- Kolovos, P., Pollock, C. (2024). Diabetic kidney disease A new era in therapeutic management. Medicine Today, 25(1-2), 47-51.
