= John J. Abel Award =

Annual pharmacology and experimental therapeutics award

The John J. Abel Award is an annual award presented by the American Society for Pharmacology and Experimental Therapeutics (ASPET). The award is given for outstanding research in the field of pharmacology and/or experimental therapeutics; which comes with a $5000 prize, An engraved plaque, and all travel expenses paid to attend the ASPET Annual Meeting at Experimental Biology. The Award is named after American biochemist and pharmacologist, John Jacob Abel.

== Recipients ==
- 1947 George Sayers
- 1948 J. Garrott Allen
- 1949 Mark Nickerson
- 1950 George B. Koelle
- 1951 Walter F. Riker, Jr.
- 1952 David F. Marsh
- 1953 Herbert L. Borison
- 1954 Eva King Killam
- 1955 Theodore M. Brody
- 1956 Fred W. Schueler
- 1957 Dixon M. Woodbury
- 1958 H. George Mandel
- 1959 Parkhurst A. Shore
- 1960 Jack L. Strominger
- 1961 Don W. Esplin
- 1962 John P. Long
- 1963 Steven E. Mayer
- 1964 James R. Fouts
- 1965 Eugene Braunwald
- 1966 Lewis S. Schanker
- 1967 Frank S. LaBella
- 1968 Richard J. Wurtman
- 1969 Ronald Kuntzman
- 1970 Solomon H. Snyder
- 1971 Thomas R. Tephly
- 1972 Pedro Cuatrecasas
- 1973 Colin F. Chignell
- 1974 Philip Needleman
- 1975 Alfred G. Gilman
- 1976 Alan P. Poland
- 1977 Jerry R. Mitchell
- 1978 Robert J. Lefkowitz
- 1979 Joseph T. Coyle
- 1980 Salvatore J. Enna
- 1981 Sydney D. Nelson
- 1982 Theodore A. Slotkin
- 1983 Richard J. Miller
- 1984 F. Peter Guengerich
- 1985 P. Michael Conn
- 1986 Gordon M. Ringold
- 1987 Lee E. Limbird
- 1988 Robert R. Ruffolo, Jr.
- 1989 Kenneth P. Minneman
- 1990 Alan R. Saltiel
- 1991 Terry D. Reisine
- 1992 Frank J. Gonzalez
- 1993 Susan G. Amara
- 1994 Brian Kobilka
- 1995 Thomas M. Michel
- 1996 John D. Scott
- 1997 David J. Mangelsdorf
- 1998 Masashi Yanagisawa
- 1999 Donald P. McDonell
- 2000 William C. Sessa
- 2002 Steven A. Kliewer
- 2003 David S. Bredt
- 2004 David Siderovski
- 2005 Randy A. Hall
- 2006 Christopher M. Counter
- 2007 Michael D. Ehlers
- 2008 Katerina Akassoglou
- 2009 John J. Tesmer
- 2010 Russell Debose-Boyd
- 2011 Laura M. Bohn
- 2012 Jin Zhang
- 2013 Arthur Christopoulos
- 2014 Craig W. Lindsley
- 2015 Pieter C. Dorrestein
- 2016 Jing Yang
- 2017 Samie R. Jaffrey
- 2018 Kirill A. Martemyanov
- 2019 Namandjé Bumpus
- 2020 Andrew Goodman
- 2021 Michael R. Bruchas
- 2022 Mikel Garcia-Marcos
- 2023 Carrie R. Ferrario
- 2024 Andrew C. Kruse
- 2025 James J. Collins
