= Eva King Killam =

American neuropharmacologist

- Born: Ellen Eva King; 1920 or 1921; New York State
- Died: July 30, 2006; California
- Education: Sarah Lawrence College, Mount Holyoke College, University of Illinois Chicago
- Partner: Keith Killam
- Awards: John J. Abel Award
- Scientific career
- Fields: Neuropharmacology
- Workplaces: University of California, Los Angeles, Stanford University, University of California, Davis

Eva King Killam (born 1920 or 1921; died July 30, 2006) was a research pharmacologist who studied the activity of drugs on the brain and behavior, developing animal models for epilepsy and opiate dependence.

Killam was the first woman to be awarded the John J. Abel Award in Pharmacology from the American Society for Pharmacology and Experimental Therapeutics (ASPET) in 1954, and the second woman to be elected as president of ASPET, in 1989. A founding member of the American College of Neuropsychopharmacology (ACNP) in 1961, she became the first woman president of the ACNP in 1988.

== Early life and education ==
Ellen Eva King was a daughter of Charles Henry King and Louise M. Richter. She had a sister Louise and an older brother, Charles, Jr. who worked for NASA. Eva grew up in Eastchester, New York. She graduated from Sarah Lawrence College with a bachelor's degree in 1942, and from Mount Holyoke College with a master's degree in zoology in 1944.

She spent a year in the Ph.D. program at Yale University, studying zoology, but returned home due to her father's illness. Working as a pharmacologist at the Burroughs-Wellcome Laboratories convinced her to study pharmacology.

She spent three years working as a pharmacologist for the Army Chemical Center with Amedeo S. Marazzi before doing doctoral work in pharmacology at the University of Illinois College of Medicine. There she worked with Klaus Unna and met her future husband, Keith Killam. She received her degree in 1953. She was the first woman to receive a Ph.D. from the program.

== Career ==
In 1953, Eva King joined the University of California, Los Angeles (UCLA) to do postdoctoral work with Horace Winchell Magoun at the UCLA Brain Research Institute. She began studying the effects of chlorpromazine.

In 1955, Eva King and Keith Killam married in Santa Monica, California. Until her retirement in 1991, Eva and her husband were frequent co-investigators.

In 1959, the Killams moved to Stanford University. At Stanford, Keith became an associate professor of pharmacology while Eva worked as a research associate.

In 1968, the Killams joined the University of California, Davis. They moved to the University of California, Davis because they could establish a primate center there. Keith was the founding chair of the Department of Pharmacology, while Eva was first a professor of physiology (1968-1972), and then a professor of pharmacology (1972-).

A founding member of the American College of Neuropsychopharmacology (ACNP) in 1961, Killam became the first woman president of the ACNP in 1988.

In 1989 Eva King Killam became the second female president of the American Society for Pharmacology and Experimental Therapeutics (ASPET), following Marjorie Horning (1984). Killam had previously served as the first female Councillor of the organization (1973-1976).

Killam also served as president of the Western Pharmacology Society which she and her husband had helped to found.

Killam served on the Task Force on Support of Training and Research in Pharmacology, part of the President's Biomedical Research Panel, in 1976. Killam was the first woman editor-in-chief of the Journal of Pharmacology and Experimental Therapeutics, serving from 1978 to 1991. She also edited Pharmacological Reviews.

== Research ==
Killam published more than 150 papers in refereed journals, many studying the activity of drugs on neural mechanisms in the areas such as the extrapyramidal motor system, the hippocampus, and the brainstem reticular formation. She made single neuron cell recordings to study the impact of substances on neuronal electrical firing rates. Behaviorally, she studied effects on sleep, wakefulness, and learning. Killam also studied pharmacological control of epilepsy, anticonvulsants and their effects on learning.

The Killams spent a sabbatical in Marseille, France in 1965 or 1966 with Robert Naquet, and discovered that baboons suffered from a type of epilepsy. After returning to the United States, they set up their own lab, and used their animal model of epilepsy to develop a screening test for anticonvulsants. They were able to examine which drugs worked and where they worked in the brain. They also assessed the behavioral toxicity of potential anti-epileptic drugs and the likelihood that they would affect learning. The baboon research also demonstrated the genetic basis underlying epileptic events, which were inherited in baboons following a strictly Mendelian pattern. Keith credits Eva with doing the majority of the work on baboons and learning.

Later in their careers, they developed an animal model in morphine-dependent Rhesus monkeys with implications for opiate dependence and HIV/AIDS research. They found that a virus similar to the one that causes HIV in humans replicated three times as often in morphine-dependent monkeys as compared to monkeys not exposed to morphine. Mutation rates of the virus were higher and the new mutations were AZT insensitive.

== Awards and honors ==
In 1954, Eva King was the first woman to receive the John J. Abel Award for research in neuropsychopharmacology from the American Society for Pharmacology and Experimental Therapeutics (ASPET). The next woman to receive the award was Lee Limbird in 1987, 33 years later. The third was Susan Amara in 1993.

In 2002, Eva King Killam received the Paul Hoch Distinguished Service Award from the American College of Neuropsychopharmacology.

The American College of Neuropsychopharmacology has named the Eva King Killam Research Award after her. The award was first given in 2011.
