= David R. Sibley =

David R. Sibley is an American academic and neuropharmacologist and the current chief of the Molecular Neuropharmacology Section at the National Institute of Neurological Disorders and Stroke (NINDS).

== Biography ==
Sibley completed his B.S. in biology at San Diego State University in 1977 and obtained his Ph.D. in physiology and pharmacology from the University of California, San Diego in 1982, where he conducted research on dopamine receptors under the supervision of Ian Creese. He then completed postdoctoral work at Duke University under the supervision of Nobel laureate Robert Lefkowitz, focusing on the regulatory mechanisms of adrenergic receptors.

In 1987, Sibley joined NINDS and was appointed chief of the Molecular Neuropharmacology Section in 1992.

In 2016, Sibley served as the president of the American Society for Pharmacology and Experimental Therapeutics (ASPET) for a year. In 2020, he became a fellow of ASPET. He is also a fellow of the American College of Neuropsychopharmacology and the International College of Neuropsychopharmacology.

== Research ==
Sibley's research focuses on the molecular characteristics of G protein-coupled receptors (GPCRs), especially those related to dopamine, and their roles in neuronal signaling. His work has resulted in the discovery of novel GPCR subtypes, allosteric ligands, biased agonists, and selective agonists and antagonists of dopamine receptor subtypes.
