= Namandjé Bumpus =

American pharmacologist (born 1981)

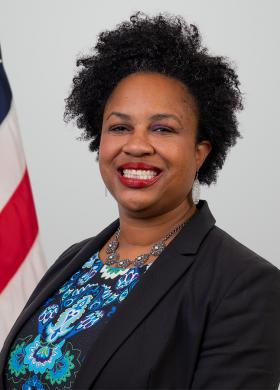
- Official portrait, 2022
- Born: February 7, 1981 (age 45); Philadelphia, Pennsylvania, U.S.
- Education: Occidental College (BA 2003); University of Michigan (PhD 2007)
- Known for: research on cytochrome P450s, antiviral drug metabolism
- Awards: Presidential Early Career Award for Scientists and Engineers John J. Abel Award
- Scientific career
- Fields: pharmacology; drug metabolism; toxicology; pharmacogenetics; pharmacokinetics
- Workplaces: Johns Hopkins University School of Medicine
- Doctoral advisor: Paul F. Hollenberg

Namandjé N. Bumpus is an American pharmacologist who served as the Principal Deputy Commissioner of the Food and Drug Administration. She was previously director of the department of pharmacology and molecular sciences at Johns Hopkins University School of Medicine, where she held the E.K. Marshall and Thomas H. Maren professorship in pharmacology.

== Early life and education ==
Namandjé Bumpus was born in Philadelphia and raised in western Massachusetts. She became interested in chemistry at a young age, even writing to the American Chemical Society while still in elementary school to ask about the kind of careers chemists can have.

She earned a B.A. in Biology from Occidental College, in Los Angeles, California, in 2003. At Occidental, she was introduced to research experiences in ecology, then she ventured into pharmacology through Charles Ross Summer Research Fellowship at the University of Michigan, during which she was mentored by Dr. Richard R. Neubig. She enjoyed the experience so much that she decided to return to the University of Michigan after graduating from Occidental College in order to pursue a PhD in pharmacology.

She earned her Ph.D. in pharmacology from the University of Michigan Medical School in 2007. Her thesis research, and much of her later work, examined how drugs are processed by cytochrome P450 enzymes, (CYPs) a family of heme-containing monooxygenases, that often help make drugs more soluble, aiding with drug clearance. Bumpus performed her thesis research in the laboratory of Dr. Paul F. Hollenberg, investigating how a naturally occurring mutation in CYP2B6 affects its ability to be inactivated by compounds known the inactivate the wild-type CYP2B6. She also looked into how naturally occurring variants could impact how patients cleared the antidepressant Bupropion, and the antiviral Efavirenz.

After graduating, she accepted a postdoctoral fellowship at the Scripps Research Institute in La Jolla, California, where she worked under the guidance of Dr. Eric F. Johnson to study the regulation of CYP4A and CYP4F genes in mice. She studied what cellular pathways regulated fatty acid metabolism and how stress pathways influence the CYPs that metabolize lipids.

== Career ==
=== Academic career ===
Bumpus became a Professor of Medicine in the clinical pharmacology division of Johns Hopkins University School of Medicine, with a secondary appointment in the Department of Pharmacology and Molecular Sciences. She started her own laboratory at Johns Hopkins School of Medicine in 2010 as an Assistant Professor of Medicine and Pharmacology, was promoted to Associate Professor in February 2015, and received Professorship in 2020. Bumpus is known for her research on the metabolism of antiviral drugs used to treat HIV-1 and how genetic variations in drug-processing enzymes may impact these drugs' efficacy.

She became Hopkins’ inaugural associate dean of institutional and student equity in 2015 and instituted mentoring programs to expand access to resources and opportunities. After holding that role for two years, in July 2017 she transitioned into a role as senior consulting strategist for Academic and Research Diversity, working with the chief diversity officer to develop and implement diversity and inclusion programs across Johns Hopkins School of Medicine.

Bumpus received a Presidential Early Career Award for Scientists and Engineers in 2016.

In July 2018, she was named as Associate Dean for Basic Research at Johns Hopkins University School of Medicine. In this role, she serves as an advocate and liaison for basic science researchers working in clinical departments to help facilitate the combination of “basic research” which seeks to answer fundamental scientific questions and “translational research” that seeks to put those findings to use, for example in a clinical setting.

In 2020, she was named director of the department of pharmacology and molecular sciences at Johns Hopkins University School of Medicine, becoming the first African-American director of a basic science department, and the first Black woman to chair any department, at Johns Hopkins University School of Medicine.

Outside of Johns Hopkins, Bumpus chaired the National Institute of Health (NIH)'s Xenobiotic and Nutrient Disposition and Action study section and served as a science commissioner and member of Washington, D.C.’s Science Advisory Board. She was an associate editor of the journal Drug Metabolism and Disposition.

She has been strongly involved with the American Society for Pharmacology and Experimental Therapeutics (ASPET), where she served as secretary and treasurer and president.

=== Research ===
A major thread of Bumpus' research is determining how antiviral drugs used to treat HIV-1 are metabolized and how genetic variations in drug-processing enzymes may impact these drugs' efficacy.

One antiviral commonly used to treat and prevent HIV is tenofovir (Viread). Tenofovir is a nucleotide analog reverse transcriptase inhibitor that prevents the HIV virus from replicating. Tenofovir is given in an inactive form – it has to be phosphorylated twice to become active, and this phosphorylation is carried out in two steps by separate kinases. Bumpus and her team identified which kinases do this and found that the enzymes responsible varied by cell type, so administration route (e.g. orally or topically) could affect how effectively the drug is processed. They also sequenced the genes of these kinases from different patients and found that some people have genetic variants in the kinases that may affect how effectively the drug is processed. Tenofovir can be given prophylactically, and Bumpus collaborated with researchers from around the world in a study of the use of tenofovir for HIV pre-exposure prophylaxis (PrEP) to prevent HIV infection in heterosexual men and women.

Bumpus has also researched nonnucleoside reverse transcriptase inhibitors. Her lab was the first to publish the P450-catalyzed phase 1 and phase 2 metabolic pathways of two nonnucleoside reverse transcriptase inhibitors, rilpivirine and etravirine and was first to characterize the metabolism of the nonnucleoside reverse transcriptase inhibitor dapivirine. She also studies antivirals that work through mechanisms other than reverse transcriptase inhibition such as the HIV entry inhibitor maraviroc; she found that genetic variants of CYP3A genes could impact its clearance.

Bumpus' lab also found that cytochrome P450 enzymes convert the anti-epileptic valproic acid into byproducts (metabolites) that activate AMPK; they showed that this could reverse the obesity-related problems of fatty liver disease and high blood sugar in mouse models.

=== Government career ===
Bumpus became the Chief Scientist at the Food and Drug Administration in August 2022. In February 2024, she was promoted to Principal Deputy Commissioner.

== Personal life ==
Outside of the lab, Bumpus enjoys sports including running and playing basketball. She is also strongly involved in community service in Washington, D.C. She volunteers at Food & Friends, which provides meals to people with life-challenging illnesses including HIV and worked with friends to organize transportation to farmers markets for people living in food deserts.

== Honors and awards ==
Bumpus has received numerous recognitions from the United States government for her work. In 2016, President Obama awarded her a Presidential Early Career Award for Scientists and Engineers, "the highest honor bestowed by the United States Government on science and engineering professionals in the early stages of their independent research careers". She delivered the National Institute of General Medical Sciences (NIGMS) Director's Early-Career Investigator Lecture in 2017, and was the Congressional Biomedical Research Caucus's invited speaker in March 2018, lecturing about informing consumers about drug metabolism. Bumpus became a fellow of the American Association for the Advancement of Science, in its Section on Pharmaceutical Sciences, in 2021. In 2022, she was elected to the National Academy of Medicine.

Additional awards she has received include:

- Tanabe Young Investigator Award from the American College of Clinical Pharmacology (2014)
- Division for Drug Metabolism Early Career Achievement Award by the American Society for Pharmacology and Experimental Therapeutics (ASPET) (2015)
- The International Society for the Study of Xenobiotics (ISSX) North American New Investigator Award in Honor of James R. Gillette (2017)
- The Daily Record Leading Women Award (2017)
- Leon I. Goldberg Young Investigator Award from the American Society for Clinical Pharmacology and Therapeutics (2017)
- John J. Abel Award in Pharmacology from ASPET (2019)
