= Jack L. Strominger =

American biochemist

- Born: August 7, 1925 (age 101); New York City, US
- Education: Harvard University; Yale Medical School
- Known for: penicillin mechanism of action Major histocompatibility complex
- Spouse: Ann
- Children: Andrew Strominger, Ethan Strominger and Paul Strominger
- Awards: John J. Abel Award (1960); Pfizer Award in Enzyme Chemistry (formerly known as the Paul-Lewis Award in Enzyme Chemistry) (1962); Selman A. Waksman Award in Microbiology (1968); Rose Payne Award (1986); Hoescht-Roussel Award, American Society for Microbiology Pasteur Medal in Gold (1990); Albert Lasker Award for Basic Medical Research (1995); Paul Ehrlich and Ludwig Darmstaedter Prize (1996); Japan Prize (1999)
- Scientific career
- Fields: Biochemistry and Immunology
- Workplaces: Washington University School of Medicine; University of Wisconsin Medical School; American Academy of Arts and Sciences; Harvard University; United States National Academy of Sciences; Dana–Farber Cancer Institute; Harvard Medical School; American Philosophical Society; American Society of Biochemistry and Molecular Biology; American Association for the Advancement of Science; American Association of Immunologists; American Society for Microbiology; American Society for Pharmacology and Experimental Therapeutics; American Chemical Society
- Doctoral students: Timothy A. Springer; Hidde Ploegh; Matthew F. Mescher; David J. Waxman; Joel N. H. Stern; Brandy L. Houser; Leonardo M.R. Ferreira; Peter Cresswell

Jack Leonard Strominger (born August 7, 1925) is the Higgins Professor of Biochemistry at Harvard University, specializing in the structure and function of human histocompatibility proteins and their role in disease. He won the Albert Lasker Award for Basic Medical Research in 1995.

== Early life and education ==
Strominger was born in New York City. He was born one of three brothers to a dentist father. He graduated from Bayside High School. He studied at Harvard University and completed his degree in psychology in 1944. During World War II, he entered the Navy V-12 program as part of Harvard College. In March 1946, he was discharged from the Navy. He received his MD degree in 1948 from Yale Medical School.

== Career ==
After graduation he joined the faculty at the Washington University School of Medicine. There he obtained a fellowship in the Department of Pharmacology with Oliver H. Lowry. Afterwards, he completed his residency in medicine at the University of Chicago, where he met his wife Ann, who was a student. In 1951, during the Korean War the United States Navy called him back into service to be stationed at a hospital in Bangkok, Thailand. Strominger married, and together, the newlyweds went to Bangkok. But, after only two or three months, he was ordered by the United States Navy to leave Bangkok. The remainder of his appointment as a commissioned officer was at the National Institutes of Health (NIH) in Bethesda, Maryland under Sanford Rosenthal, chief of the Laboratory of Pharmacology in the National Institute of Arthritis and Metabolic Diseases. From work he had done in the Lowry laboratory and using work begun by James T. Park, Strominger began new work into the recently-purified-compound penicillin's antibiotic mechanism of action. Strominger left the NIH, and, after brief study at Carlsberg Laboratory and Cambridge University, returned to Washington University in St. Louis as an assistant professor of pharmacology. At Washington University in St. Louis, he discovered that uridine nucleotide that accumulated in the penicillin-treated bacterium staphylococcus aureus was a precursor of the bacterial cell wall.

Strominger joined the University of Wisconsin, Madison, as chairman of the department of pharmacology from 1964 to 1968. There, with Donald J. Tipper in 1965, he demonstrated the mechanism of action by which antibiotic penicillins kill bacteria by inhibiting the completion of the synthesis of structural components of bacterial cell walls known as peptidoglycans. Penicillins specifically inhibit the activity of enzymes that are needed for the cross-linking of peptidoglycans during the final step in cell wall biosynthesis. These antibiotics do this by binding to the group of enzymes known as Penicillin-binding proteins using a chemical structure found on penicillin molecules known as a β-lactam ring. β-lactam imitates the naturally occurring acyl-D-alanyl-D-alanine substrate for the enzymes.

He joined the Harvard faculty in 1968 to work in the biochemistry and molecular biology department specializing in microbial biochemistry, with a small portion of his time being devoted to organ transplantation biology. Knowledge was scarce with respect to the mechanisms of allograft rejection. There was none for the transplantation antigens. Graft acceptance or rejection was only hinted at through previous knowledge of Blood type erythrocyte transfusion. In the mid-1960's, Allan Davies from the United Kingdom had discovered a number of the 3,6-dideoxyhexoses that could be utilized to distinguish bacterial surfaces. Davies speculated that the specificity of transplantation antigen might also be determined by cell surface arrangements of sugars. Later, Stan Nathenson worked with Davies to characterize transplantation antigens and discovered that they could be solubilized from the surfaces of cells by the protease papain.

In 1974, Stominger became a member of the Dana–Farber Cancer Institute, a cancer treatment and research institution in Boston, Massachusetts, one of the clinical affiliates and research institutes of Harvard Medical School. At that time, the institute's director was Emil Frei who had been a classmate with Strominger at Yale Medical School. There he worked on immunology involving Major histocompatibility complex (MHC) proteins and their interaction with viruses. The MHC is a large locus on vertebrate DNA containing a set of closely linked polymorphic genes that code for cell membrane-embedded external surface proteins essential for the adaptive immune system. These cell surface proteins are called MHC molecules. Together with X-ray diffraction protein crystallographer Don Wiley, Strominger (who supplied biological cell culture systems and proteins) solved the chemical structures and three-dimensional structures of several MHC proteins, and further, solved the three-dimensional structures of the chemical complexes of these proteins during their peptide substrate interactions. Early work elucidated the three-dimensional structures of the human class I MHC molecules of HLA-A2, HLA-A68, and HLA-B27. Ultimately, papain-solubilized fragments of the human class II MHC antigens HLA-DR1, HLA-DR2, HLA-DR3, HLA-DR4, HLA-DR7, and HLA-DR8 were purified from homozygous human B lymphoblastoid cell lines and crystals were grown for diffraction studies.

== Awards ==
Strominger was the first recipient of the Selman A. Waksman Award in Microbiology in 1968. In 1969, Strominger received the Golden Plate Award of the American Academy of Achievement. Strominger was elected to the American Academy of Arts and Sciences in 1967. He was elected to the National Academy of Sciences in 1970, and the National Institute of Medicine in 1975. He was elected to the American Philosophical Society in 1994. In 1999, he received the Japan Prize.

== Personal life ==
Strominger married Ann in 1951. She died in 2017. Their children are physicist Andrew Strominger, Ethan Strominger and Paul Strominger.
