= David Siderovski =

American pharmacologist

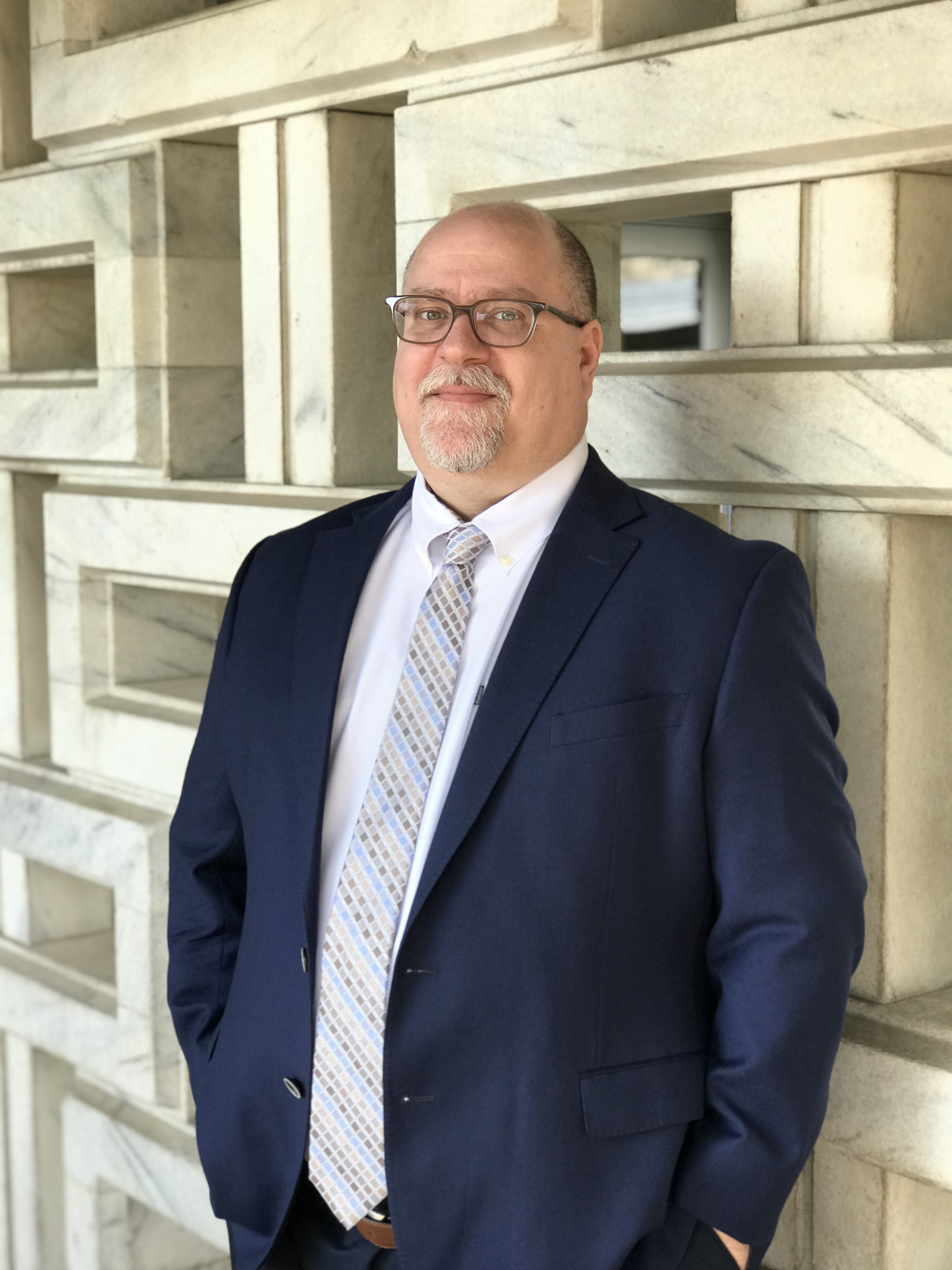
- Education: Queen's University (BSc); University of Toronto (PhD)
- Awards: ASPET's John J. Abel Award in 2004
- Scientific career
- Fields: Biochemistry; Pharmacology; Neuroscience; Medical education
- Workplaces: Amgen Research Institute; University of North Carolina at Chapel Hill; West Virginia University; University of North Texas Health Science Center
- Thesis: Human Immunodeficiency Virus Type-1 Trans-activator of Transcription (HIV-1 Tat) (1997)
- Doctoral advisor: Tak Wah Mak
- Other academic advisors: Alfred G. Gilman; Robert J. Lefkowitz

David Siderovski is a North American pharmacologist. From March 2020 to November 2025, Siderovski was Chair of the HSC Department of Pharmacology & Neuroscience at the University of North Texas Health Science Center. From 2012 to 2019, he was the E.J. Van Liere Medicine Professor and Chair of Physiology, Pharmacology & Neuroscience for the West Virginia University School of Medicine.

== Education ==
Siderovski attended Earl Haig Secondary School in North York, Ontario, graduating in 1985. In 1989, Siderovski graduated with a BSc from Queen's University in Kingston, Ontario.

Siderovski began his PhD training at the University of Toronto in May 1989. During his fifth year of his PhD, he began full-time work as a research scientist in the Quantitative Biology Laboratory of the Amgen Research Institute, Toronto. He successfully defended his PhD thesis in November 1997. He left the Amgen Research Institute in December 1998, having contributed to three patents as a co-inventor.

== Career ==
After completing his industrial postdoctoral position at the Amgen Research Institute in 1998, Siderovski joined the faculty at the University of North Carolina at Chapel Hill as an assistant professor of pharmacology. His earliest publications discuss the RGS protein superfamily, and determinations of their varied protein structures and cellular functions.

In 2004, Siderovski was named the top American Pharmacologist under 40 and awarded the John J. Abel Award by the American Society for Pharmacology and Experimental Therapeutics.

From 2006 to 2012, Siderovski was the Thomas J. Dark Basic Science Director of UNC's Medical Scientist Training Program. In August 2014, Siderovski was appointed Director of the West Virginia University School of Medicine MD/PhD Scholars Program. Siderovski has been serving as Editorial Board Member for the Journal of Biological Chemistry since 2012.
