= John S. Lazo =

John Stephen Lazo is an American pharmacologist noted for his work discovering the fundamental mechanisms of action of small molecule therapeutics and the factors that confer drug resistance. He is a professor emeritus of pharmacology at University of Virginia.

== Early life and education ==
Lazo was born in Philadelphia, Pennsylvania, and spent his childhood growing up outside of Camden, New Jersey. In high school, he ran cross-country and track and was a member of the school's debating team. He earned his bachelor's degree in chemistry at Johns Hopkins University and was awarded a PhD in pharmacology under the mentorship of Raymond W. Ruddon at the University of Michigan. Lazo completed postdoctoral training in cancer pharmacology with Alan C. Sartorelli at Yale University.

== Career and research work ==
Lazo joined the faculty at Yale University and achieved the rank of Associate Professor of Pharmacology before moving to the University of Pittsburgh as the Allegheny Foundation Professor and Chair of Pharmacology, a position he held for seventeen years. Lazo subsequently became the founding director of the University of Pittsburgh Drug Discovery Institute and the Fiske Drug Discovery Laboratory. In 2011, Lazo moved to the University of Virginia as the associate dean for basic research and the Harrison Distinguished Teaching Professor of Pharmacology. He held a secondary appointment in the Department of Chemistry at the University of Virginia and an adjunct professorship at the Virginia Tech Carilion Research Institute. He is now an emeritus professor at both the University of Pittsburgh and the University of Virginia. Lazo's current primary research interests are in molecular pharmacology and drug discovery with a particular focus on anticancer drugs and protein tyrosine phosphatases. He has authored or coauthored over 380 publications, holds 12 issued patents, and has co-founded several biotechnology companies. Currently, Lazo is the Chief Scientific Officer at KeViRx, Inc.

== Selected awards and honors ==
- Elected Fellow of the American Association for the Advancement of Science
- Elected Fellow of the American Society for Pharmacology and Experimental Therapeutics (ASPET)
- National Institutes of Health Research Career Development Award
- ASPET-Astellas Award in Translational Pharmacology
- Member of the Board of Directors of the American Association for Cancer Research
- Member of the Board of Publication Trustees and President of ASPET
- Member of the International Advisory Board of the Cancer Research & Therapeutic Innovation (Toulouse, France)
- Board member of the Carnegie Museum of Natural History
- Chairman of the Council for Extramural Grants of the American Cancer Society
