= Dolores Cooper Shockley =

American pharmacologist (1930–2020)

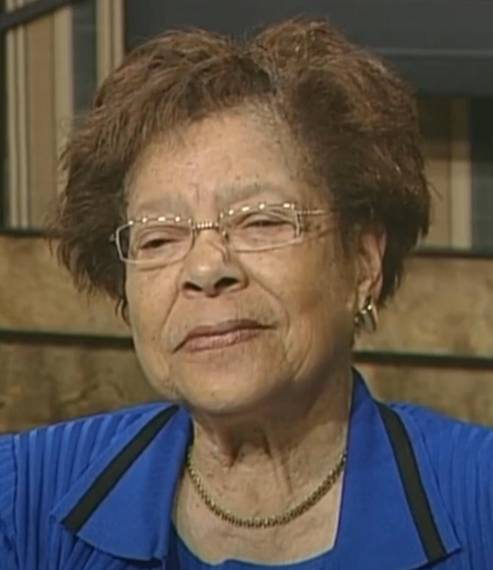
- Shockley in 2009
- Born: Dolores Cooper; April 21, 1930; Clarksdale, Mississippi
- Died: October 10, 2020 (aged 90); Nashville, Tennessee
- Education: Xavier University; Purdue University
- Known for: Neurotoxicity, first black woman to receive PhD in Pharmacology in the U.S.
- Spouse: Dr. Thomas E. Shockley (m. 1958-2001) (his death)
- Children: 4
- Awards: Lederle Faculty Award
- Scientific career
- Fields: Pharmacology and Neuroscience
- Workplaces: University of Copenhagen Meharry Medical College

Dr. Dolores C. Shockley (April 21, 1930 – October 10, 2020) was the first black woman to receive a PhD in pharmacology in the United States and one of the first African American students to receive a PhD from Purdue University. After obtaining her PhD she became faculty at the historically black school Meharry Medical College where she subsequently became the first black woman to chair a Pharmacology department in the United States in 1988. Her research contributions included studying the effects of chemical pollutants on the brain and identifying pharmacological agents that interact with drugs of abuse such as cocaine. She was a distinguished scholar and emeritus professor at Meharry Medical College.

== Early life and education ==
Dolores Cooper was born in 1930 in Mississippi. She grew up in a segregated society in the small rural town of Clarksdale, Mississippi, where at the time black and white children attended different schools. Shockley said in an interview that her school in Clarksdale had very few school supplies and that she learned her science from chemistry sets at home. Motivated by the lack of a drug store to serve the black community in Clarksdale, Shockley decided to pursue a degree in pharmacology during college with the initial idea of starting a pharmacy in her hometown although she later decided to pursue a research career. Shockley attended Xavier University of Louisiana where she completed a bachelor's degree in pharmacology in 1951. She decided to pursue a graduate degree and attended Purdue University from 1951 to 1955. She became one of the first black students to receive a PhD from the institution.

During graduate school, Shockley experienced racism when trying to rent a room outside campus. In an interview, Shockley reported that while in West Lafayette, Indiana, she was also refused service by several people. About this, Shockley said, "This was extremely hurtful because you never knew when you would be rejected or refused. I went to my room and cried several times. But my zealous commitment to succeed propelled me to work harder to overcome my lack of prior experience." While Shockley was at Purdue University in the 1950s, black students were not allowed to get haircuts at the student center, which prompted Shockley and other students to petition the president to reverse this policy. In addition, Shockley became an activist in her community by joining a group of diverse students called "The Panel of Americans," which consisted of a group of students from different ethnicities and races who visited churches and community organizations to talk about how they, too, were Americans. Regarding her work in this student group, Shockley said, "I believe or hope that we dispelled some of the fallacy of racial, ethnic and religious inferiority."

== Career and research ==
Shockley became the first black woman to receive a PhD in pharmacology in the United States. After finishing her PhD, she received a Fulbright Fellowship and worked with Dr. Knud Moller at the Pharmacology Institute in Copenhagen, Denmark from 1955 to 1957. When Shockley returned to the U.S., she was offered a job at Meharry Medical College in Tennessee as an assistant professor. When Shockley complained that her salary offer was lower than that of the male faculty, her department chair said that as a married woman she did not deserve the same salary; despite these challenges she continued to fight for salary equity. In 1967 Shockley became an associate professor at Meharry and in 1988 she became the chair of the Pharmacology Department, making her the first black woman to chair a Pharmacology Department in the United States.

During her time as a chairperson, Shockley focused on improving the Pharmacology PhD program funding and training quality at Meharry. In efforts to expand training opportunities for students at her institution, Shockley started a collaboration with Vanderbilt University in which they shared student seminar series and department retreats. Under Shockley, the Meharry PhD Program awarded degrees to the majority of black pharmacologists in the country. Shockley served on many national committees including NIH, NSF, NRC, and FDA committees and held office in the American Society for Pharmacology and Experimental Therapeutics (ASPET).

Shockley had two main lines of research, one related to neurotoxicity of pollutants and one related to identifying pharmacological agents that interact with cocaine with the goal of developing therapies for drug abuse. Shockley studied how pollutants such as benzo(a)pyrene and fluoranthene affect the nervous system. Her research showed that these pollutants have neurotoxic and behavioral effects. Furthermore, her research showed that the effects of benzo(a)pyrene, which is present in tobacco smoke and grilled meats, are mediated by oxidative stress.

In addition, Shockley researched how calcium blockers affect the neurotoxic and behavioral effects of stimulants, such as cocaine, with the goal of identifying potential pharmacological agent to act as antidote to cocaine toxicity. Her research identified that Isradipine, a calcium channel antagonist, decreased the behavioral effects of cocaine in rats.

During an interview in 1997, Shockley was asked what her biggest accomplishment in science was. She identified her work as an educator and improving the PhD training program at Meharry, which was serving a predominantly African American student population. Related to her contributions Shockley said, "I've tried to reinstate and strongly promote graduate education [at Meharry]. About half of all the minority PhD's in pharmacology have come from our program. I think this will be my greatest contribution."

== Awards and honors ==
Shockley is a distinguished alumni of Xavier University of Louisiana and Purdue University. Shockley received the Lederle Faculty Award from 1963 to 1966.

Many scientific organizations and societies have created awards in Shockley's honor. In 2010, the American Society for Pharmacology and Experimental Therapeutics (ASPET) established a travel award in her honor for underrepresented students to attend their Annual meeting. In 2009, The Dolores C. Shockley Lectureship and Mentoring Award was inaugurated at the School of Medicine, Vanderbilt University, in honor of the collaborative work Shockley did with the department of Pharmacology at Vanderbilt. In 2017, the American College of Neuropsychopharmacology presented the Dolores Shockley Minority Mentoring Award to recognize college members who have successfully mentored young scientists from underrepresented minorities in the field of neuropsychopharmacology.

== Personal life ==
Dolores Cooper married Dr. Thomas E. Shockley, a microbiologist. The couple had four children and was married for 43 years until her husband's death in 2001. She died on October 10, 2020, aged 90, in Nashville.
