= Strominger =

Strominger is a surname. Notable people with the surname include:

- Andrew Strominger (born 1955), American physicist
- Jack L. Strominger (born 1925), American biochemist
