= Nestlé Wyeth Nutrition =

Nutrition company

Nestlé-Wyeth Nutrition is a company that provides food products to meet the needs of infants, young children and adults. Through scientific research, they claim to help nourish children when breastfeeding is not an option.

== History ==
Wyeth Nutrition started in 1915 when Henry Grestberger manufactured the first formula patterned after breast milk called SMA (synthetic milk adaptive). Wyeth Pharmaceuticals originally focused on the research, development, and marketing of prescription drugs and acquired Grestberger's firm. Wyeth's pharmaceutical division was further subdivided into five subdivisions: Wyeth Research, Prescription Products, Biotech, Vaccines, and Nutritionals. Wyeth's research and development director Robert Ruffolo was quoted in The New York Times about the firm's efforts to develop new drugs in 2010.

On 23 April 2012, Nestlé agreed to acquire Pfizer Inc.'s infant-nutrition, formerly Wyeth Nutrition, unit for US$11.9 billion, topping a joint bid from Danone and Mead Johnson.
