= Lee Limbird =

American pharmacologist

Lee E. Limbird
- Born: Lee Eberhardt; November 27, 1948 (age 77); Philadelphia, Pennsylvania
- Education: College of Wooster, University of North Carolina, Chapel Hill
- Awards: John J. Abel Award, Julius Axelrod Award
- Scientific career
- Fields: Pharmacology
- Workplaces: Vanderbilt University, Meharry Medical College, Fisk University

Lee Limbird (born November 27, 1948, in Philadelphia, Pennsylvania) is a pharmacologist, Dean of the School of Natural Science, Mathematics and Business & Professor in the Department of Life and Physical Sciences at Fisk University, Nashville, Tennessee.

Limbird has been recognized for "outstanding scientific contributions in research and mentoring in pharmacology", in particular her "pioneering research on alpha-2 adrenergic receptors and how they relate to the regulation of blood pressure, sedation, pain suppression and opioid drug action". Among other awards, she received the Julius Axelrod Award from the American Society for Pharmacology and Experimental Therapeutics (ASPET) in 2013.

== Early life and education ==
Lee Eberhardt was born on November 27, 1948, in Philadelphia, Pennsylvania.

Eberhardt attended the College of Wooster in Wooster, Ohio, working in her fourth year with analytical chemist Theodore Roosevelt Williams. Her independent study project, “Role of CPK Isoenzymes in the Diagnosis of Myocardial Infarction,” was co-mentored by Galen Wagner at Duke University. Eberhardt received her B.A. in chemistry in 1970 from the College of Wooster. She subsequently married Tom Limbird, who was a student and resident in orthopedic surgery at Duke.

In 1970, Lee Limbird joined the PhD program in biochemistry at the University of North Carolina, Chapel Hill. She left after two semesters but was encouraged to continue working on creatine phosphokinase (CPK) isoenzyme detection as a research assistant with Charles Roe at Duke University. Limbird's research, showing the importance of the MB isozyme of CPK in myocardial tissue for diagnosis of cardiac infarction, was accepted as the basis for her PhD degree, awarded in 1973 by UNC Chapel Hill. She then became a postdoctoral student, working with Robert J. Lefkowitz on the molecular basis of cardiac disease. One of his first students, she is credited with helping to establish the research direction of the Lefkowitz laboratory.

== Career ==
In 1979, Limbird joined Vanderbilt University as an Assistant Professor of Pharmacology. She led her own lab for several years, focusing on the actions of epinephrine and norepinephrine in alpha2-adrenergic receptor pathways.

Limbird served as Chair of the Department of Pharmacology at the Vanderbilt School of Medicine from 1991-1998, and was the first Associate Vice Chancellor for Research of the Vanderbilt University Medical Center from 1998-2003. With Hal Moses, Limbird was instrumental in determining the 1997 strategic plan for the program.

After 25 years at Vanderbilt, Limbird chose to join minority-serving institutions, in hopes of using her scientific administrative, and personal experience to help counter the impact of systemic racism. In 2005, she became Vice President for Research and Chair of the Department of Biomedical Sciences at Meharry Medical College. In 2008, Limbird became Dean of the School of Natural Sciences, Mathematics and Business Administration at Fisk University in Nashville, Tennessee.

== Research ==
Much of Limbird's research has explored the activity of G-protein coupled receptors. She has demonstrated how alpha-2 adrenergic receptors are involved in regulation of blood pressure, suppression of pain, sedation and the action of opioid drugs. She has developed techniques for selectively manipulating such receptors.

Limbird is the author of Cell Surface Receptors: A Short Course in Theory and Methods (1985, 1996, 2004); co-editor with Joel Hardman of the 9th (1995) and 10th (2001) editions of Goodman and Gilman’s Pharmacological Basis of Therapeutics; editor of Alpha2-Adrenergic Receptors (1988) and co-editor with Stephen Lanier of α2-Adrenergic Receptors. Structure, Function and Therapeutic Implications (1996). Limbird has served on the editorial boards of the Journal of Biological Chemistry, the American Journal of Physiology, and Molecular Pharmacology.

== Awards ==
- 1977, Young Investigator award, National Institutes of Health (NIH)
- 1979, Research Career Development Award, NIH
- 1983, Recognition Award for Young Scholars, American Association of University Women
- 1987, John J. Abel Award in Pharmacology, American Society for Pharmacology and Experimental Therapeutics (ASPET) Limbird was the second woman to receive this award, the first being Eva King Killam in 1954.
- 1989, MERIT Award, NIH
- 1994, Distinguished Investigator Award, National Alliance for Research on Schizophrenia and Depression (NARSAD, now Brain & Behavior Research Foundation).
- 1998, Distinguished Alumni Award, College of Wooster
- 2004, Goodman and Gilman Award in Drug Receptor Pharmacology, ASPET
- 2013, Julius Axelrod Award, ASPET.
