= Joseph T. Coyle =

American psychiatrist and neuroscientist

- Born: October 9, 1943 (age 82); Chicago, Illinois, U.S.
- Education: College of the Holy Cross (BA); University of Paris; Johns Hopkins University (MD)
- Awards: John J. Abel Award (1979); Sarnat Prize (2017)
- Scientific career
- Fields: Neuroscience
- Workplaces: Harvard Medical School; National Institutes of Health; Johns Hopkins University

Joseph Thomas Coyle Jr. (born October 9, 1943) is an American psychiatrist and neuroscientist known for his research on schizophrenia and the neurobiology of mental illness. He is the Eben S. Draper Professor of Psychiatry and Neuroscience at Harvard Medical School.

Coyle was the president of the Society of Neuroscience from 1991 to 1992 and the president of the American College of Neuropsychopharmacology in 2001. He is a member of the Institute of Medicine.

== Early life and education ==
Coyle was born on October 9, 1943, in Chicago, Illinois. Several members of his family were physicians, including uncles and cousins. His maternal grandfather, a doctor in Iowa, was an immigrant from Luxembourg who attended Rush Medical College. Coyle's father, an orthopedic surgeon, was the team physician for the Chicago White Sox.

Coyle was raised in the South Side of Chicago. As a child, he owned a chemistry set and took courses in taxidermy. He attended a Jesuit high school and then enrolled at the College of the Holy Cross, where he majored in French and philosophy but also studied classical Greek, Latin, and French. As an undergraduate, Coyle spent a formative year abroad studying at the University of Paris in France. In his senior year at Holy Cross, he wrote a senior thesis on the Irish playwright Samuel Beckett, graduating with a Bachelor of Arts (B.A.), cum laude, in 1965. He later recalled the college's focus in literature, languages, and philosophy as having "greatly transformed my view of the world and solidified my interests in art, music, and literature".

Inspired by the works of Sigmund Freud, Jacques Lacan, and Jean-Paul Sartre, Coyle became a psychiatric orderly at a local community hospital during the summer after college. When the brother of a friend was admitted due to paranoid delusions, Coyle resolved to study psychiatry in medical school. He studied medicine at Johns Hopkins University and attended lectures by Leon Eisenberg, Jerome Frank, Robert Cooke, Seymour Kety, and Curt Richter. In his second year, Coyle was influenced by neuroscientist Solomon Snyder, who taught psychopharmacology, and became an assistant in Snyder's laboratory. He received a scholarship to remain under Snyder at the Johns Hopkins School of Medicine, where he earned his Doctor of Medicine (M.D.) in 1969.

Subsequently, he completed an internship in pediatrics, followed by a residency in psychiatry from 1973 until 1976. During this time period, Coyle worked with Julius Axelrod, a Nobel laureate known for his research on catecholamines, which include epinephrine and norepinephrine.

== Academia and clinical careers ==
Coyle is the current Chair of Psychiatry and Neuroscience at Harvard Medical School. He became a member of the National Academy of Medicine in 1990, a fellow of Arts and Sciences, and of the American Psychiatric Association. From 1991 to 2001, he was the Chair of the Consolidated Department of Psychiatry, also at Harvard. Before beginning work for Harvard Medical School in 1991, Coyle was a professor of Child Psychiatry at Johns Hopkins, where he began in 1975, and was eventually named the Distinguished Service Professor of Child Psychiatry in 1985. During his clinical career Coyle established a basis combining neuroscience and clinical psychiatry studies, where he has contributed to the understanding of certain neuropsychiatric disorders such as schizophrenia and bipolar disorder. His studies of these disorders lead him to the discovery of neurological mechanisms underlying diseases such as Huntingtons and Alzheimers.

Coyle was president of the Society for Neuroscience from 1991 to 1992 and the president of the American College of Neuropsychopharmacology in 2001. He was the Editor-in-Chief of the Archives of General Psychiatry from 2001 to 2014.

== Research ==
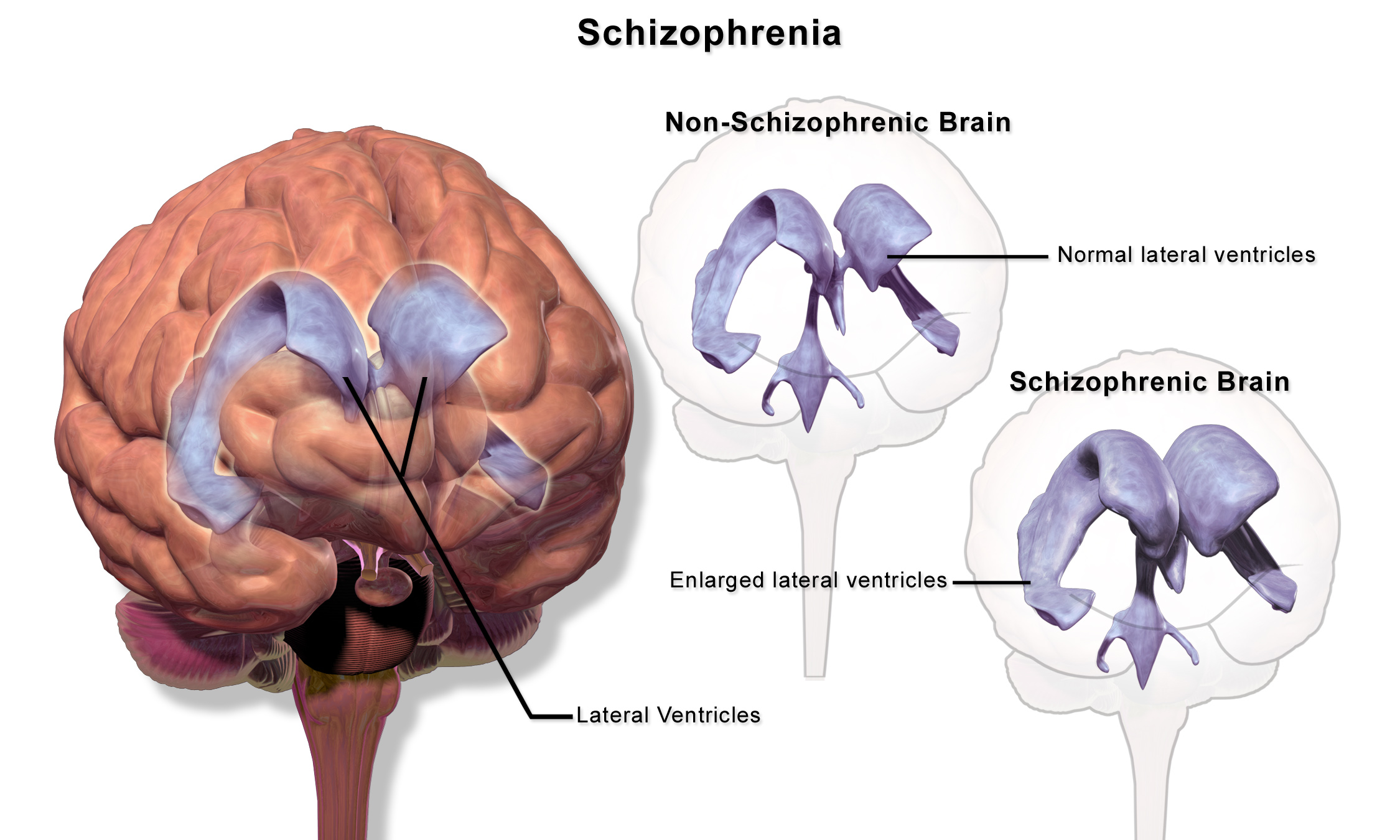
Comparison between a non-schizophrenic brain and a schizophrenic brain

Coyle is the current Director of the Laboratory for Psychiatric and Molecular Neuroscience. Though he has earned recognition for work in numerous areas of neurobiology and psychopharmacology, an area of research that Coyle has earned distinction in is that of the neurotransmitter glutamate. Coyle has studied glutamate's excitatory effects on the brain along with the role this neurotransmitter plays in common mental illnesses, primarily in schizophrenia. A main focus of research for Coyle and his associates is the understanding of the neuromolecular mechanisms underlying psychiatric disorders, being able to understand how these mechanisms affect the brain and overall behavior, as well as aid in development of efficient and effective treatment methods. Coyle focused his attention specifically on schizophrenia and bipolar disorder, Huntington's, and Alzheimer's disease. He was one of the first scientists to ever identify structural abnormalities in bipolar disorder, similar to schizophrenia. Coyle's lab aims to mimic the neuromolecular mechanisms underlying these disorders in model organisms such as mice, who have similar nervous systems to humans. One way they do this is by targeting the N-methyl-D-aspartate receptor (NMDAR), which has a vital role in transmission of excitatory information within numerous brain pathways and structures. Results from these targeted experiments indicated that when genes encoding these NMDARs were altered, the resulting chemical pathways and behavioral traits in the model organisms mimicked those found/seen in schizophrenia patients. Such research can be beneficial to science/medical research because, In doing these experiments, they can target glutamatergic transmission pathways associated with mental illnesses like schizophrenia, and develop treatments that target and reverse/prevent the damage caused by such pathways, as well as provide a better overall understanding of a wide variety of mental conditions. For example, the work Coyle's lab published regarding the role of NMDARs in schizophrenia led to testing of NMDAR-restoring medications, which resulted in reversal of damage to functional pathways, as well as overall improvement in behavior and cognitive abilities.

== Awards and honors ==
- 1968 - Henry Strong Denison Research Scholarship
- 1969 - Alpha Omega Alpha Student Research Award
- 1978 - A.E.Bennett Award in Basic Science
- 1979 - John Jacob Abel Award
- 1979 - Sato International Memorial Award
- 1982 - Daniel Efron Award
- 1985 - Foundations' Fund Prize for Research in Psychiatry
- 1986 - Alpha Omega Alpha honor society
- 1990 - Institute of Medicine of the National Academy of Sciences
- 1990 - Nancy and Daniel Weisman Award for Research on Mental Retardation
- 1991 - Edward A. Strecker Award
- 1992 - William R. McAlpin Jr. Research Achievement Award
- 1997 - Award for Neuropsychiatric Research
- 2001 - Special Achievement Award Society for Neuroscience
- 2004 - Lieber Prize for Schizophrenia Research
- 2007 - Sanctae Crucis Award College of the Holy Cross
- 2007 - Julius Axelrod Award American College of Neuropsychopharmacology
- 2013 - Julius Axelrod Prize Society for Neuroscience
- 2017 - The Rhoda and Bernard Sarnat International Prize in Mental Health

== Selected publications ==
- Coyle JT, Puttfarcken P. Oxidative stress, glutamate, and neurodegenerative disorders. Science. 1993 Oct 29;262(5134):689-95. (Cited 4730 times, according to Google Scholar
- Whitehouse PJ, Price DL, Struble RG, Clark AW, Coyle JT, Delon MR. Alzheimer's disease and senile dementia: loss of neurons in the basal forebrain. Science. 1982 Mar 5;215(4537):1237-9. (Cited 4210 times, according to Google Scholar.
- Coyle JT, Price DL, Delong MR. Alzheimer's disease: a disorder of cortical cholinergic innervation. Science. 1983 Mar 11;219(4589):1184-90. (Cited 3710 times, according to Google Scholar.
- Whitehouse PJ, Price DL, Clark AW, Coyle JT, DeLong MR. Alzheimer disease: evidence for selective loss of cholinergic neurons in the nucleus basalis. Annals of Neurology: 1981 Aug;10(2):122-6 (Cited 2084 times, according to Google Scholar.
- Coyle JT, Schwarcz R. Lesion of striatal neurons with kainic acid provides a model for Huntington's chorea. Nature. 1976 Sep;263(5574):244-6.(Cited 1427 times, according to Google Scholar.
- Murphy TH, Miyamoto M, Sastre A, Schnaar RL, Coyle JT. Glutamate toxicity in a neuronal cell line involves inhibition of cystine transport leading to oxidative stress. Neuron. 1989 Jun 1;2(6):1547-58. (Cited 1067 times, according to Google Scholar.
- Goff DC, Coyle JT. The emerging role of glutamate in the pathophysiology and treatment of schizophrenia. American Journal of Psychiatry. 2001 Sep 1;158(9):1367-77. (Cited 1133 times, according to Google Scholar.
- Lisman JE, Coyle JT, Green RW, Javitt DC, Benes FM, Heckers S, Grace AA. Circuit-based framework for understanding neurotransmitter and risk gene interactions in schizophrenia. Trends in neurosciences. 2008 May 1;31(5):234-42. (Cited 1078 times, according to Google Scholar.
- Coyle JT. Glutamate and schizophrenia: beyond the dopamine hypothesis. Cellular and molecular neurobiology. 2006 Jul;26(4):363-82. (Cited 1021times, according to Google Scholar.
