= Drug Metabolism and Disposition =

- Discipline: Pharmacology, toxicology
- Language: English
- Edited by: Xinxin Ding

Publication details
- History: 1973–present
- Publisher: American Society for Pharmacology and Experimental Therapeutics (United States)
- Frequency: Monthly
- Open access: After 12 months
- Impact factor: 3.922 (2020)

Standard abbreviations
- ISO 4: Drug Metab. Dispos.

Indexing
- CODEN: DMDSAI
- ISSN: 0090-9556 (print); 1521-009X (web)
- OCLC no.: 01784380

Links
- Journal homepage; Online access; Online archive

Drug Metabolism and Disposition is a peer-reviewed scientific journal covering the fields of pharmacology and toxicology. It was established in 1973 and is published monthly by the American Society for Pharmacology and Experimental Therapeutics. The journal publishes articles on in vitro and in vivo studies of the metabolism, transport, and disposition of drugs and environmental chemicals, including the expression of drug-metabolizing enzymes and their regulation. As of 2022, the editor-in-chief is XinXin Ding.

All issues are available online as PDFs, with text versions additionally available from 1997. Content from 1997 is available freely 12 months after publication.

== History ==
Drug Metabolism and Disposition was established in 1973 by Kenneth C. Leibman. The initial frequency was bimonthly (six annual issues); it increased to monthly in 1995. The journal was published on behalf of the society by Williams & Wilkins until the end of 1996.

== Abstracting and indexing ==
According to the Journal Citation Reports, Drug Metabolism and Disposition received a 2020 impact factor of 3.922. The journal is abstracted and indexed in the following databases:

- BIOSIS Previews
- Chemical Abstracts
- Chemical Abstracts Service
- Current Contents/Life Sciences
- EMBASE
- MEDLINE
- META
- Science Citation Index
