= Molecular Pharmacology =

- Discipline: Pharmacology
- Language: English
- Edited by: Kathryn E. Meier

Publication details
- History: 1965–present
- Publisher: American Society for Pharmacology and Experimental Therapeutics (United States)
- Frequency: Monthly
- Impact factor: 3.987 (2017)

Standard abbreviations
- ISO 4: Mol. Pharmacol.

Indexing
- ISSN: 0026-895X (print); 1521-0111 (web)

Links
- Journal homepage

Molecular Pharmacology is a peer-reviewed scientific journal published by the American Society for Pharmacology and Experimental Therapeutics since 1965. It is indexed in MEDLINE, Meta, Scopus, and other databases.

According to the Journal Citation Reports, the journal received a 2017 impact factor of 3.987.

== History ==
The journal was established by Avram Goldstein in 1965. As of 2017, the editor-in-chief is Kathryn E. Meier, (Washington State University).
