= Sanford Rosenthal =

Dr Sanford Rosenthal MD
- Sanford Rosenthal
- Born: May 5, 1897; Albany, Georgia, U.S.
- Died: May 1, 1989 (aged 91); Potomac, Maryland, U.S.
- Education: Vanderbilt University
- Known for: Liver function tests Mercury poisoning antidote Antibiotic cure for pneumonia Burn therapy Histamines
- Spouse: Lillian Lieberfeld Rosenthal (m. 1930; 3 children)
- Scientific career
- Fields: Pharmacology
- Workplaces: National Institute of Health

Sanford Morris Rosenthal (May 5, 1897 – May 1, 1989) was born in Albany, Georgia.

== Early life and career ==
He received a medical degree at Vanderbilt University in 1920, and completed a residency and internship at Boston City Hospital (1921–1922). However, his interests shifted to medical research when he became a Fellow of the National Research Council in a pharmacology lab at Johns Hopkins University (1922–1925). He worked in the Department of Pharmacology at McGill University in Montreal, Canada from 1925 to 1927. Finally, in 1928, he joined the United States Public Health Service (USPHS) in Washington, D.C. Dr. Rosenthal was Chief of the Laboratory of Pharmacology and Toxicology at the National Institute of Arthritis and Metabolic Diseases (NIAMD) for 13 years before retiring in 1961. He attained the rank of medical director in the USPHS Commissioned Officer Corps. After retiring, Dr. Rosenthal continued to do research at the NIAMD for almost 20 years. He was an author on over 110 papers between 1922 and 1975.

== Major contributions to medicine ==
=== Liver function tests ===
Rosenthal's first published paper provided a method for testing the health of the liver. He showed that the rate at which the liver metabolizes an ingested dye can be used to quantify how well this organ functions. His continued work on liver function tests resulted in the use of bromsulphthalein, which remains in use.

=== Mercury poisoning antidote ===
Rosenthal discovered that sodium formaldehyde sulfoxylate was an antidote for mercury poisoning. This antidote was widely used, and Rosenthal's discovery is considered one of the major achievements in the history of medical research at the NIH.

=== Antibiotic cure for pneumonia ===
Based on his observation that sodium formaldehyde sulfoxylate also has antibacterial activity, Rosenthal began work on another group of sulfur-containing compounds -– the sulfa drugs. His decade-long work on sulfa drugs led to his discovery of a treatment for pneumococcal pneumonia with sulfanilamide.

=== Burn therapy ===
In the early 1940s, Rosenthal worked on improving the ability of victims of severe burns to survive. Death commonly resulted from shock due to fluid (plasma) loss from the burned skin. He discovered that the replacement of the salts that are in the secreted plasma is the key to a successful and simplified treatment. During the 1950s and early 1960s, Rosenthal and colleagues undertook a long-term study to test the efficacy of drinking a saline solution (containing table salt and baking soda) to replace the lost salts (the "Peru Project"). His research group demonstrated that this therapy was an effective alternative to the traditional treatment using intravenous injections of whole blood or plasma. The simplified burn therapy remains widely used.

=== Histamines ===
Rosenthal and his collaborators were pioneers in the area of histamine biochemistry and physiology. They developed a widely used method for quantifying histamine, worked on the pharmacology of histamines, and determined the biosynthetic pathway for spermidine. Rosenthal also collaborated in research on the role of polyamines in the function of viral DNA.

== Awards and honors ==
Rosenthal was elected to the American Academy of Arts and Sciences in 1979. He was also a member of American Medical Association, American Society for Pharmacology and Experimental Therapeutics, Society of American Bacteriologists, and Society for Experimental Biology and Medicine.

In 1962, he received the Public Health Service Meritorious Service Medal from the U.S. Department of Health, Education, and Welfare. In 1973, he received the Harvey Stuart Allen Distinguished Service Award from the American Burn Association. In 1980, he received the Award for Experimental Therapeutics from the American Society for Pharmacology and Experimental Therapeutics in recognition of his pioneering work on the treatment of shock due to burns.
