= Mary Abel =

American writer (1850–1938)

Mary Abel (c. 1850–1938) was an American writer known for her work in home economics and nutrition which mainly revolved around the publication of pamphlets and her book, Successful Family Life on the Moderate Income.

== Early life and education ==
Little is known about Abel's life until her marriage to John J. Abel in 1883. Abel moved to Europe with her husband after his postgraduate year at Johns Hopkins University. In 1891, Mary and John returned to the United States where Mary began her work in home economics and nutrition. Abel initially moved to the Midwest but relocated to Baltimore in 1893. She and her husband John both died in 1938.

== Career ==
While in Europe, Mary learned enough German to allow her to write Practical Sanitary and Economic Cooking in English and German after she returned to the United States. Abel also became interested in comparative methods of domestic economy in Europe, causing her to initiate work with Ellen Swallow Richards at the New England Kitchen. The first publication by Abel, Richards, and others was published in 1892 on the science of nutrition. Abel produced many popular pamphlets for the Rumford Kitchen, established by Richards, for the Chicago World's Fair. In 1893, Abel's husband was appointed to the position of professor of pharmacology at Johns Hopkins University and, after the move to Baltimore, began new work in nutrition, writing pamphlets on the nutritional value of various foods for the United States Department of Agriculture and children's nutrition for the American Public Health Association.

Abel served as a founding member of the Ellen Swallow Richards Lake Placid Conferences that operated from 1899 to 1908. The conferences were developed with the intention of discussing the betterment of the home and were a push into the up-and-coming home economics movement. Abel also was an early member of the American Home Economics movement and was an editor of the Journal of Home Economics, founded by Richards. Abel continued to produce pamphlets on the prevention of infectious diseases, such as typhoid fever.

Abel's best known work, Successful Family Life on the Moderate Income, was published in 1921. Abel's book detailed how individuals of limited means could live well. Abel apparently used these methods in her own home very effectively.

== Honors ==
Mary's book, Practical Sanitary and Economic Cooking, earned her the Lomb prize by the American Public Health Association in 1890.
