= Eugene Higgins =

American carpet business heir and philanthropist

- Born: January 14, 1860; New York City
- Died: July 29, 1948 (aged 88); Torquay, England
- Education: Columbia University
- Parent(s): Elias Smith Higgins; Emma Louise Baldwin

Eugene Higgins (1860 – 1948) was the rich heir to a carpet-making business, known as a bon vivant, sportsman, and philanthropist. A bachelor when he died in 1948, his estate went to establish the Higgins Trust, at that time, the eleventh largest of its kind in the United States.

== Background ==
Eugene Higgins was born on January 14, 1860, in New York City. His parents were Elias Smith Higgins (1815–1889), a carpet manufacturer who made a fortune with "labor-saving devices," and Emma Louise Baldwin (1827–1890). In 1882, he graduated from Columbia University, where he was a classmate of future Columbia president Nicholas Murray Butler.

== Career ==
Higgins never worked for a living, though he did maintain a private office at 50 Union Square East. In 1908, his steam yacht the Varuna wrecked off the Madeira Islands; he received a medal for saving the lives of several guests aboard.

A sportsman, Higgins won the 1890 American fencing championship and was a proficient golfer, hunter, fisherman, and yachtsman. He maintained a townhouse on Fifth Avenue in New York City and a country house in Morristown, New Jersey.

In 1897 he commissioned the 1573 ton steam yacht 'Varuna' from A. & J. Inglis, designed by George Lennox Watson, a sister ship to SY 'Mayflower' (for Ogden Goelet) and SY 'Nahma' (for Robert Goelet).

In 1910, he ran into trouble with customs officials. In 1932, the United States Supreme Court ruled that Higgins was "not entitled to deduct for Federal income purposes the expenses of managing his securities in 1932 and 1933."

== Personal life and death ==
Higgins was reputedly the "wealthiest bachelor in New York," ahead of George Washington Vanderbilt II, Mehmet Ali (brother of the Khedive of Egypt), Frank W. Riggs, and members of the Goelet family. He never married.

Higgins died at age 88 on July 29, 1948, in Torquay, United Kingdom. He bequeathed $10,000 each to his brother-in-law Henry Mortimer Brooks (for his nephew, Reginald Brooks) and two nieces, "merely as a token of affection... knowing that they are all well and amply provided for."

== Higgins Estate ==
In 1949, The United States Trust Company issued more than $18 million of "outstanding tax-exempt bonds" owned by Higgins' estate. In 1952, his personal secretary asked for $150,000 in recognition of his extra duties as chess and yachting expert. In 1953, the Higgins Estate was valued at more than $40 million ($483 million in 2025 dollars).

== Higgins Trust ==
The Eugene Higgins Scientific Trust (a.k.a. "Higgins Trust"), also known as the Eugene Higgins Science Fund, was founded upon his death.

=== Eugene Higgins Scientific Trust ===
In 1948, the trust donated $40 million to Columbia, Harvard, and Princeton. In 1949, the trust gave another $600,000 to each of these universities for advanced scientific studies. In 1951, the trust donated another $1 million, shared equally, to Columbia, Harvard, and Princeton universities.

The funds from this trust endowed chairs at Columbia, Harvard, Princeton, and Yale universities.

Notable people holding a Eugene Higgins Professorship include:

- Thomas Appelquist
- Peter Cresswell
- Steven M. Girvin (formerly)
- Karsten Heeger
- Michal Lipson
- Elizabeth L. Paluck
- Jason Petta

=== Eugene Higgins Charitable Trust ===
In 1976, Eugene Higgins Charitable Trust was founded, now based in Providence, Rhode Island.
