= Katerina Akassoglou =

Greek neuroimmunologist

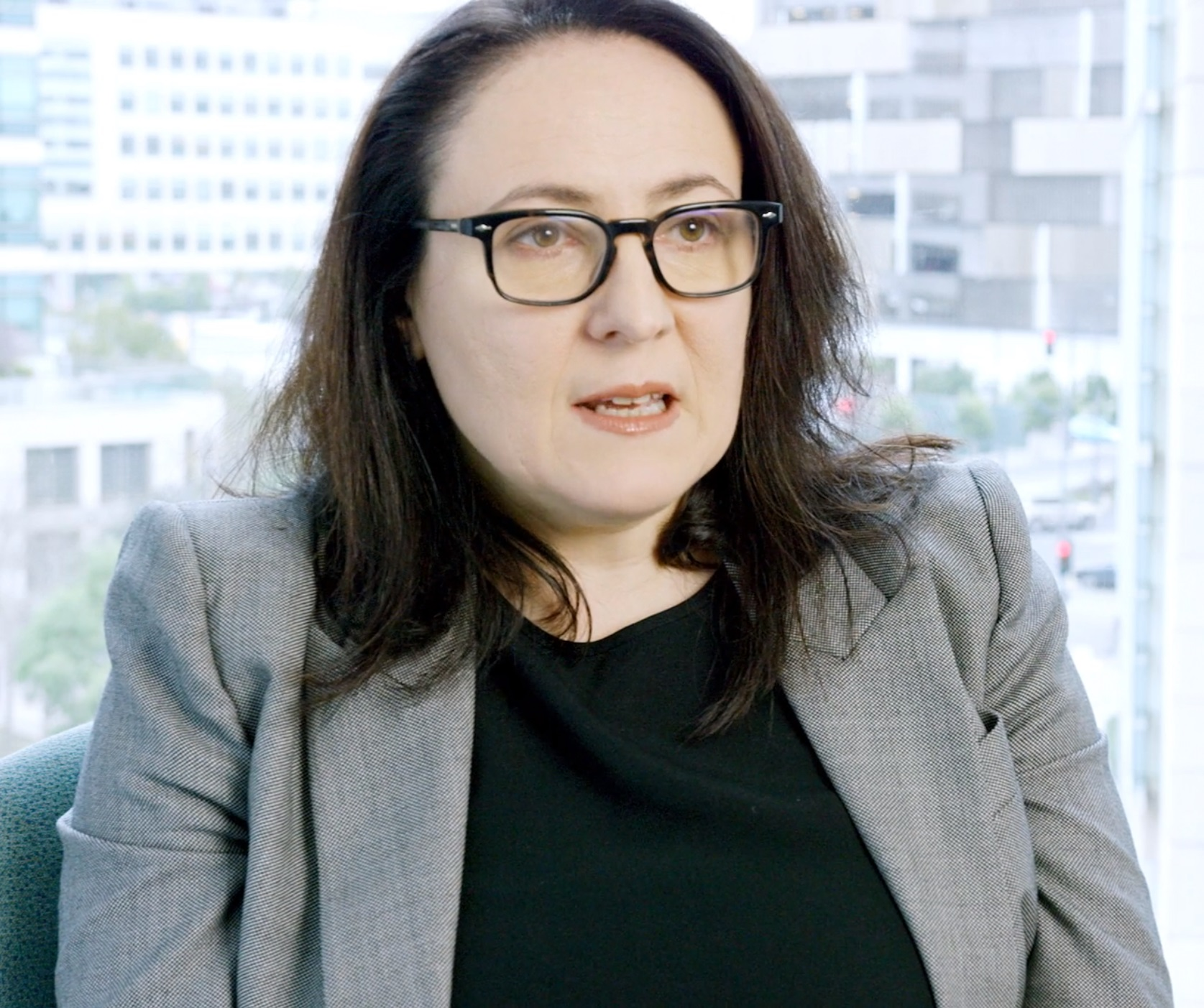
- Akassoglou in 2019
- Born: 1972 (age 53–54); Athens, Greece
- Education: University of Athens, The Rockefeller University, New York University Skirball Institute of Biomolecular Medicine
- Known for: Role of fibrin in CNS inflammation and neurodegeneration
- Awards: Presidential Early Career Award for Scientists and Engineers, John J. Abel Award in Pharmacology, Barancik Prize for Innovation in MS Research
- Scientific career
- Fields: Neuroimmunology, hematology
- Workplaces: University of California, San Francisco

Katerina Akassoglou is a neuroimmunologist who is a Senior Investigator and Director of In Vivo Imaging Research at the Gladstone Institutes. Akassoglou holds faculty positions as a Professor of Neurology at the University of California, San Francisco. Akassoglou has pioneered investigations of blood-brain barrier integrity and development of neurological diseases. She found that compromised blood-brain barrier integrity leads to fibrinogen leakage into the brain inducing neurodegeneration. Akassoglou is internationally recognized for her scientific discoveries.

== Early life and education ==
Akassoglou was born in Athens, Greece. She was inspired to pursue science in her undergraduate degree after her high school biology teacher assisted her in securing a summer internship in an Immunology lab.

Akassoglou pursued her undergraduate degree at the University of Athens, graduating with a Bachelor of Science in biology in 1996. She stayed at the University of Athens for her graduate degree, where she focused on neuroimmunology. Her work explored the role of the cytokine TNFα in neuroinflammation under the mentorship of George Kollias and Lesley Probert within the Hellenic Pasteur Institute. During her PhD, Akassoglou pursued training in neuropathology under the mentorship of Hans Lassman at the University of Vienna, Austria. After completing her graduate studies in 1998, Akassoglou went to the United States to pursue her postdoctoral training under the mentorship of Sid Strickland at both the State University of New York at Stony Brook and the Rockefeller University. She specialized in neurovascular biology and began to study the actions of Fibrin in the central nervous system. She completed her postdoctoral training with Strickland in 2002 and then pursued a second postdoctoral fellowship at the New York University in the Skirball Institute of Biomolecular Medicine until 2003.

== Research ==
To explore the biology of Tumor Necrosis Factor signalling and probe its role in promoting disease, Akassoglou expressed TNFα in a transmembrane form on various brain cells. She found that when she specifically expressed TNFα on astrocytes, this led to chronic inflammation and neurodegeneration. This was not the case for TNFα expression on neurons, which highlighted that contact dependent TNF signals in the vicinity of astrocytes promote degeneration. Since it was evident that TNF signalling contributed to neurodegeneration, Akassoglou explored how TNF signalling in the central nervous system might be implicated in multiple sclerosis. After inducing expressing of TNF from glial cells, she found oligodendrocyte death and myelin degeneration in the central nervous system, similar to the pathology one would find in MS. Akassoglou then found that by blocking the TNFα receptor, she was able to abrogate inflammation and cell death suggesting a major role for TNF signalling in MS type brain pathology. Early into her postdoctoral work, Akassoglou found that deposition of fibrin exacerbates neuronal injury and degeneration, and agents which lyse fibrinogen could act as potent therapeutic agents in neurodegeneration. Akassoglou and her colleagues then probed the underlying mechanisms with which fibrin mediates neuronal damage, and they found that fibrin has an effect on Schwann Cell differentiation, keeping these cells in their non-myelinating state. They further found that fibrin deposition also changes the extracellular matrix which inhibits Schwann Cell migration, further preventing re-myelination and leading to degeneration of peripheral nerves.

== Career ==
In 2004, Akassoglou joined the faculty in the Department of Pharmacology at the University of California, San Diego, where she is Adjunct Professor of Pharmacology. Akassoglou's lab was centered around exploring neurovascular regulation of inflammation and tissue repair in the context of various neurological diseases. Akassoglou's lab seeks to understand how blood proteins interact with cells and disrupt signalling in the brain parenchyma in times of blood-brain barrier disruption. The overall goal of the lab is to target these mechanisms therapeutically in neurological disease to stop neurodegeneration and inflammation in the central nervous system.

In 2008, Akassoglou accepted a position as an Associate Investigator at the Gladstone Institutes of Neurological Disease, maintaining an Adjunct Professorship in Pharmacology at UCSD. Akassoglou is also a Professor of Neurology at the University of California, San Francisco Weill Institute for Neurosciences and she now Directs the Gladstone Center for In Vivo Imaging Research. Her lab focuses on in vivo imaging to observe the behavior of immune and glial cells in the CNS during their interactions with blood proteins.

Akassoglou's work has made changes to the way the field understands the interactions between the immune system, vascular system, and brain. Her research elucidated the role that fibrin, a blood protein implicated in coagulation, has in the activation of microglia and the development of inflammation and neurodegeneration. Akassoglou and her group developed immunotherapy to inhibit fibrin's actions in the brain to abrogate inflammation and prevent neuronal death. Following this drug development, Akassoglou co-founded a spin-off company at Gladstone Institutes, called MedaRed, that will continue to develop neuroimmune targeting therapies for neurodegeneration treatment. Akassoglou is the first female investigator at Gladstone to have founded a spin-off company.

=== Role of fibrinogen and microglial activation in neurodegeneration ===
Akassoglou and her team were the first to show that fibrinogen leakage into the brain parenchyma activates microglia and leads to neurodegeneration. They found that when fibrinogen binds to the microglial receptor CD11b/CD18 it leads to microglial migration towards vasculature and the release of reactive oxygen species that damage neurons and lead to neuronal death. However, when they blocked the receptor for fibrinogen on microglia, they no longer saw microglial migration towards vasculature and neuronal death did not occur. They later found that fibrin binding to the microglial receptor directly promotes spine elimination of neurons and promotes cognitive decline. Again, they used two-photon imaging to track the progress of disease and directly observe the role fibrinogen plays in microglial activation, spine elimination, and subsequent cognitive decline.

In order to understand the progression towards neurodegeneration after blood brain barrier leakage, Akassoglou and her team tracked the activity patterns of thrombin and found that thrombin activity in the CNS preceded any sign of disease, and when thrombin activity peaked, so did fibrin activation of microglia, followed by neuron death. These findings suggest that early detection of thrombin might be a suitable diagnostic for later neurodegeneration.

Since Akassoglou and her team found fibrin so critical in the development of neurodegeneration in times of blood brain barrier leakage, they designed a novel therapeutic to target fibrin and prevent its effects on microglia. They generated a monoclonal antibody, 5B8, that binds to fibrin and is able to inhibit CNS inflammation and oxidative stress without affecting blood clotting capabilities. Akassoglou then proceeded to push this monoclonal antibody into the biotechnology space so that it can be further tested and eventually used in clinical trials and then for treatment of various types of neurodegenerative and brain autoimmune disorders.

== Awards and honors ==
- 1998 Women In Neuroimmunology Award by Cedric Raine and the International Society for Neuroimmunology
- 2000 Young Investigator Award from the International Society for Fibrinolysis and Proteolysis
- 2002 Young Investigator Award from the International Society for Neurochemistry
- 2006 Young Investigator Award from the International Fibrinogen Society
- 2006 Presidential Early Career Award for Scientists and Engineers (PECASE)
- 2007 Dana Award in Brain and Immunoimaging
- 2008 John J Abel Award in Pharmacology (4th female in 60 years to win this award).
- 2009 EUREKA Award from the National Institutes of Health
- 2015 The Marilyn Hilton Award for Innovation in MS Research
- 2019 Barancik Prize for Innovation in Multiple Sclerosis Research
- 2019 Greek Top Women Award
- 2021 Election as a Fellow of the American Association for the Advancement of Science
