= Hidde Ploegh =

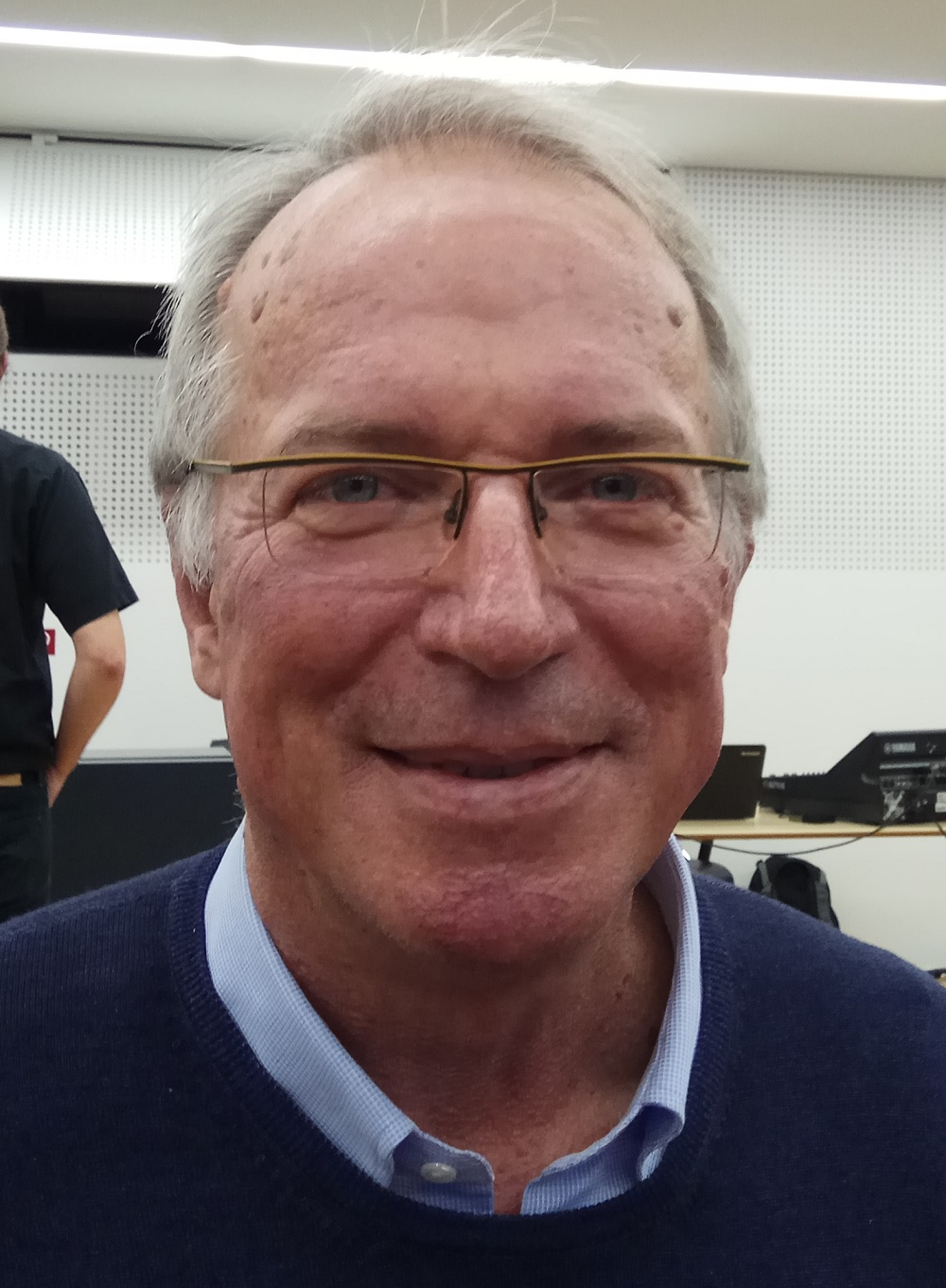
- Hidde Ploegh (2017)
- Education: University of Groningen, University of Leiden
- Scientific career
- Fields: Immunology
- Workplaces: Boston Children's Hospital
- Doctoral advisor: Jack Strominger

Hidde Lolke Ploegh (born 7 January 1953) is an immunologist at Boston Children's Hospital, known for his contributions in understanding antigen processing and the evasion of the immune system by viruses.

== Career and education ==
Ploegh, a native of the Netherlands, received a Bachelor of Science degree in 1975, and a Master of Science degree in biology and chemistry in 1977, from the University of Groningen. Having worked for six months in Jack Strominger's lab at that time, he was able to continue his PhD studies under Strominger and received a doctorate from the University of Leiden. Ploegh would then go on to hold positions at a number of institutions such as the University of Cologne, the Netherlands Cancer Institute, Utrecht University (2012–2015), and Harvard Medical School, before becoming a member of the Whitehead Institute.

In 1986 Ploegh became a member of the European Molecular Biology Organization. In 1997 Ploegh became a corresponding member of the Royal Netherlands Academy of Arts and Sciences. In 2016 he was elected to the National Academy of Sciences.

== Research ==
Much of the research by Ploegh is in the fields of biochemistry and immunology. Earlier in his career, Ploegh's research focused on the ability of MHC molecules, such as MHC-II, to interact with antigen peptides inside a cell.

More recently, the Ploegh lab at the Whitehead Institute has been using a technique called “sortagging” to look at the pathways through which viruses are able to avoid detection by the immune system. Memory B cells are lymphocytes known to be produced to fight off secondary infection, yet the influenza virus is able to avoid the immune response generated by these cells. This method was used to tag the influenza virus, so that it could be observed, and it was found that the interaction of virus antigens with the B-cell receptor is required for infection.

Ploegh has also been involved in developing therapeutic roles for sortagging. Erythrocytes are the most abundant cell type found in the body known for lacking nuclei as a mature cell. This makes them ideal for the delivery of drugs through the body as they cannot mutate as a mature cell. Ploegh and his colleagues have been able to use sortase to cut erythrocyte surface proteins, allowing the binding of biotin and its circulation throughout the body. As sortagging allows the binding of a number of different proteins, it may be used for the binding of antibodies and their delivery to target sites in the body.
