= Walter J. Koch =

American scientist (born 1961)

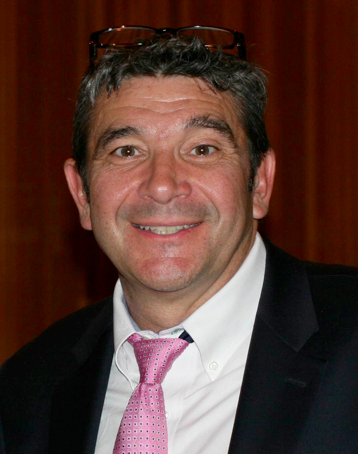
- Born: March 2, 1961 (age 65)
- Known for: G protein-coupled receptor
- Scientific career
- Workplaces: Duke University

Walter J. “Wally” Koch (born March 2, 1961) is an American scientist best known for his work with G protein-coupled receptors in the heart and gene therapy approaches to cardiovascular disease. He is currently an Instructor at Duke University, and formerly at Lewis Katz School of Medicine at Temple University where he was the Director of the Center for Translational Medicine, Professor and Chairman of the Department of Pharmacology, and W.W. Smith Chair in Cardiovascular Medicine. In 2013, he co-founded the biotech company, Renovacor.

== Early life ==
Koch was born on March 2, 1961, in Bryan, Ohio to Walter E. “Bud” and Marguerite Koch. After graduating from Bryan High in 1979, he attended the University of Toledo (College of Pharmacy) where he received a Bachelor of Science in Pharmacy in 1984. Subsequently, he attended the University of Cincinnati (College of Medicine) where he received his Ph.D. in Pharmacology and Cell Biophysics in 1990 under the laboratory of Dr. Arnold Schwartz, where he remained as a post-doctoral fellow until 1991.

== Career ==
Koch began his career at Duke University Medical Center and Howard Hughes Medical Institute where he served as a research fellow (1991–1995) in the laboratory of Dr. Robert Lefkowitz, winner of the 2012 Nobel Prize in Chemistry. It was under the mentorship of Lefkowitz that Koch established a foundation in G protein-coupled receptor signaling and regulation in the heart. During the remainder of Koch’s career at Duke University Medical Center, he worked as a Research Professor in the Department of Pharmacology and Cancer Biology, eventually advancing to Tenured Professor of Experimental Surgery.

In 2003, he moved to Thomas Jefferson Medical College where he created and developed a Center for Translational Medicine. In 2012 Koch became the Chairman of the Department of Pharmacology and Director of the Center for Translational Medicine at Temple . In his career to date, he has over 350 peer-reviewed publications, close to 70 year-equivalents of NIH R01 funding and has trained close to 50 Fellows. Over the last two decades Koch has investigated the novel roles that G protein-coupled receptor kinases (GRKs) play in cardiac injury and repair. Through manipulating and therapeutically targeting particular GRKs, his investigations have shown potential for the development of new heart failure treatments. Particularly, preclinical studies have shown that the inhibition of GRK2 in the heart via a gene therapy approach, has led to the reversal of heart failure in both small and large animal models. Human clinical trials, which are in the final planning stages and will be conducted through NIH grants and the biotech company Renovacor.

== Personal life ==
Walter J. Koch married Macaira Koch (née Macaira Rose Michel) on October 1, 1988. They have two sons: Walter Michel (born November 12, 1998) and Joseph Hunter (born April 8, 2001).

== Awards and notable achievements ==
Koch has served on NIH study sections as both a reviewer and Chair. He is the outgoing Chair of the Basic Cardiovascular Sciences Council of the American Heart Association and a current Associate Editor of Circulation Research. Koch has won numerous awards, among which include:

- Honorary Member, Korean Society of Cardiology. Awarded April 19, 2014 in Gwangju, South Korea
- Inaugural William Wikoff Smith Chair in Cardiovascular Medicine, September 16, 2013
- 2011 Outstanding Investigator Award, International Society for Heart Research
- Fellow of the International Society of Heart Research (F.I.S.H.R.): 2010
- Thomas Smith Memorial Lecture and Award for Cardiovascular Signaling from the American Heart Association: 2009
- Fellow of the American Heart Association (F.A.H.A.): 2001
- Distinguished Alumnus Award from the University of Toledo College of Pharmacy: 2001
- Distinguished Alumni Lecture, University of Cincinnati College of Medicine: 1999
- Howard Hughes Medical Institute Fellowship: 1991 - 1995
