= Peter Cresswell (immunologist) =

British immunologist

Peter Cresswell FRS is a British immunologist, and Eugene Higgins Professor of Immunobiology and Professor of Cell Biology and of Dermatology, at Yale School of Medicine. His lab primary focuses on the molecular mechanisms of antigen processing particularly the functions of the major histocompatibility complex (MHC) molecules and CD1 molecules. He is most notable for discovering and identifying the MHC class II molecules and viperin.

== Life ==
Cresswell earned a B.S., and M.S. in microbiology from the University of Newcastle upon Tyne, and a Ph.D. in biochemistry and immunology from London University. He studied at Harvard University, with Jack Strominger. Before joining the faculty at Yale School of Medicine, Cresswell was Chief of the Division of Immunology at Duke University Hospital.

He has been an investigator of the Howard Hughes Medical Institute since 1991.

Cresswell serves as Section Head of the Faculty of 1000 since 11 July 2001 and is a Member Editor of the Proceedings of the National Academy of Sciences of the United States of America. In 2009 he joined the NKT Therapeutics Scientific Advisory Board and since August 2012, he serves as an associate editor of the Journal of Biological Chemistry. and is a member of the Cancer Research Institute.

== Awards ==
- Member of the National Academies of Sciences, Engineering, and Medicine
- Fellow of The Royal Society (2000)
- Member of the National Academy of Sciences (2001)
- Buchanan Medal (2009)
- Fellow of the American Academy of Arts and Sciences (2010)
