= Pharmacological Reviews =

- Discipline: Pharmacology
- Language: English
- Edited by: Lynette C. Daws

Publication details
- History: 1949–present
- Publisher: American Society for Pharmacology and Experimental Therapeutics (United States)
- Frequency: Quarterly
- Impact factor: 19.3 (2023)

Standard abbreviations
- ISO 4: Pharmacol. Rev.

Indexing
- CODEN: PAREAQ
- ISSN: 0031-6997 (print); 1521-0081 (web)
- OCLC no.: 00824083

Links
- Journal homepage; Online access

Pharmacological Reviews is a quarterly peer-reviewed scientific journal publishing review articles on all aspects of pharmacology and related topics. It is published by the American Society for Pharmacology and Experimental Therapeutics. The editor-in-chief is Lynette C. Daws (The University of Texas Health Science Center at San Antonio).

According to the Journal Citation Reports, the journal has a 2023 impact factor of 19.3.
