= Journal of Pharmacology and Experimental Therapeutics =

- Discipline: Pharmacology, therapeutics
- Language: English
- Edited by: Beverley Greenwood-Van Meerveld

Publication details
- History: 1909–present
- Publisher: Elsevier, on behalf of the American Society for Pharmacology and Experimental Therapeutics
- Frequency: Monthly
- Open access: Delayed, after 12 months; Hybrid
- Impact factor: 3.1 (2023)

Standard abbreviations
- ISO 4: J. Pharmacol. Exp. Ther.

Indexing
- CODEN: JPETAB
- ISSN: 0022-3565 (print); 1521-0103 (web)
- LCCN: sf80000806
- OCLC no.: 1606914

Links
- Journal homepage; Online access; Online archive

The Journal of Pharmacology and Experimental Therapeutics is a monthly peer-reviewed scientific journal covering pharmacology. It was established in 1909 and is published by Elsevier on behalf of the American Society for Pharmacology and Experimental Therapeutics. The journal publishes mainly original research articles, and accepts papers covering all aspects of the interactions of chemicals with biological systems.

John Jacob Abel founded the society in December 1908 when he invited 18 pharmacologists to his laboratory in order to organize a new society. At the end of the meeting Abel announced the establishment of the journal.

== Abstracting and indexing ==
The journal is abstracted and indexed in:

- Biological Abstracts
- BIOSIS Previews
- Chemical Abstracts Service
- Current Contents/Life Sciences
- Embase
- Index Medicus/MEDLINE/PubMed
- Science Citation Index Expanded
- Scopus

According to the Journal Citation Reports, the journal has a 2023 impact factor of 3.1.
