= American College of Neuropsychopharmacology =

Founded in 1961, the American College of Neuropsychopharmacology (ACNP) is a professional organization of leading brain and behavior scientists. The principal functions of the College are research and education. Their goals in research are to offer investigators an opportunity for cross-disciplinary communication and to promote the application of various scientific disciplines to the study of the brain's effect on behavior, with a focus on mental illness of all forms. Their educational goals are to encourage young scientists to enter research careers in neuropsychopharmacology and to develop and provide accurate information about behavioral disorders and their pharmacological treatment.

== Organization ==
The college is an honorary society. Members are selected primarily on the basis of their original research contributions to the broad field of neuroscience. The membership of the college is drawn from scientists in multiple fields including behavioral pharmacology, neuroimaging, chronobiology, clinical psychopharmacology, epidemiology, genetics, molecular biology, neurochemistry, neuroendocrinology, neuroimmunology, neurology, neurophysiology, psychiatry, and psychology.

== Annual meeting ==
The annual meeting of the College is a closed meeting; only the ACNP members and their invited guests may attend. Because of the College's intense concern with, and involvement in, the education and training of tomorrow's brain scientists, the College selects a number of young scientists to be invited to the annual meeting through a competitive process open to all early career researchers. This meeting, a mix of foremost brain and behavior research world-wide, is designed to encourage dialogue, discussion, and synergy by those attending.

== Awards ==
The ACNP offers the following awards.

- Julius Axelrod Mentorship Award
- Daniel H. Efron Research Award
- Joel Elkes Research Award
- Barbara Fish Memorial Award
- Paul Hoch Distinguished Service Award
- Eva King Killam Research Award
- Dolores Shockley Advancement Award
- Media Award
- Public Service Award
- Advocacy Award

== Publication ==
The Springer-Nature Publishing Group journals Neuropsychopharmacology and NPP-Digital Psychiatry and Neuroscience are their official publications. Neuropsychopharmacology was first published in 1987 and NPP-Digital Psychiatry and Neuroscience is an Open Access journal that started in 2023.

== See also ==
- European Brain Council
- European College of Neuropsychopharmacology
- Neuropsychopharmacology (journal)
