= Robert R. Ruffolo Jr. =

American pharmacologist (born 1950)

Robert R. Ruffolo (born April, 1950, in Yonkers, New York) was president of research and development for Wyeth Pharmaceuticals, and corporate senior vice president of Wyeth from 2001 to 2008. In that role, he managed an R&D organization of 7,000 scientists, with an annual budget of $3 billion. During his career in the pharmaceutical industry, Ruffolo played a significant role in the discovery and/or development of a number of marketed products, including dobutamine (Dobutrex) for the acute management of congestive heart failure, and eprosartan (Teveten) for hypertension. He holds the patent for the discovery of use of carvedilol (Coreg) for the treatment of congestive heart failure which changed the paradigm for the treatment of this devastating disease, and he led the research team that discovered ropinerole (Requip) for Parkinson's Disease. Ruffolo was awarded the Discoverers Award in 2008 by the Pharmaceutical Research and Manufacturers Association (PhRMA), for his pioneering work on the discovery of carvedilol for congestive heart failure.

== Early life and education ==
Ruffolo Jr. was born in April 1950, in Yonkers, New York

He has a Bachelor of Science in pharmacy, 1973, Ohio State University; PhD in pharmacology, 1976, also from Ohio State.

== Career ==
He spent two years as a postdoctoral fellow at the National Institutes of Health, then spent six years at Eli Lilly and Company and 17 years at SmithKline Beecham, where he was senior vice president and director of biological sciences, worldwide. He joined Wyeth in 2000, working his way up to the position of President of Research and Development. At Wyeth, Dr. Ruffolo managed an R&D organization of 9,000 scientists with an annual budget in excess of $3 billion. Ruffolo retired shortly before Pfizer acquired Wyeth in 2009.

Ruffolo has authored nearly 500 full-length publications and 200 abstracts, and has edited 17 books. He was editor-in-chief of Pharmacology Communications, Current Opinions in Pharmacology and Pharmacology Reviews and Communications. Ruffolo has served on the editorial boards of 29 international scientific journals. The American Society for Information Science and Technology designated Ruffolo as a Highly Cited Scientist for being among the top one-hundred most cited pharmacologists in the world over the past two decades.

Robert is married and has three children.

== Awards ==
Ruffolo received a number of prestigious awards, including

- Chief Scientific Officer of the Year (2004),
- George B. Koelle Award for Scientific Excellence (2005),
- Lifetime Achievement Award, Scrip, (2008)
- Lifetime Achievement Award, The Ohio State University (2009)
- Discoverers Award, PhRMA for Carvedilol (Coreg) (2008)
- Lorenzini Gold Medal for Biomedical Research (1999),
- John Jacob Abel Award in Pharmacology (1988),
- Prix Galien Special Commendation for Excellence and Innovation in Research (1996),
- Distinguished Alumni Award from The Ohio State University (1989).

In 2007, Ruffolo received Degrees Honoris Causa in management engineering from the University of Catania in Sicily, Italy and a Doctorate in science from West Virginia University.

== Director and scientific advisory board service ==
Since retiring from Wyeth/Pfizer, Ruffolo has joined a number of boards, where he consults with early and mid-stage life science companies on the development and commercialization of new pharmaceutical products:

- Sigilon Therapeutics (Private) appointed Dr. Ruffolo to its board of directors in 2015
- Aridis Pharmaceuticals (Nasdaq: ARDS) appointed Dr. Ruffolo to its board of directors in April 2016
- Sapience Therapeutics (Private) appointed Dr. Ruffolo to its board of directors in 2017
- Diffusion Pharmaceuticals (Private) appointed Dr. Ruffolo to its board of directors in July 2017
- LB Pharmaceuticals (Nasdaq "LBRX") appointed Dr. Ruffolo to its board of directors in July 2019
- Aragen Life Sciences (formerly known as GVK BIO (Private) appointed Dr. Ruffolo to its board of directors in July 2019
- Elicio Therapeutics (Nasdaq "ELTX") appointed Dr. Ruffolo to its board of directors in 2018
