= Meta (academic company) =

Artificial intelligence company

Meta ULC
- Founded: 2009
- Founders: Sam Molyneux, Amy Molyneux
- Defunct: March 31, 2022
- Headquarters: Toronto, Ontario, Canada
- Area served: Academia, government, publishing, industry
- Services: Scientific knowledge network powered by machine intelligence
- Number of employees: 350
- Website: meta.org

Meta was a Canadian artificial intelligence company that specialized in analyzing and organizing knowledge from the text of scientific literature using machine learning. Founded in 2010 by siblings Sam Molyneux and Amy Molyneux in Toronto, Canada, and backed by institutional venture capital investors, the company developed AI-powered tools. Meta's assets were later transferred to Facebook Inc. to enable its rebranding to Meta Platforms Inc. in 2021 by the Chan Zuckerberg Initiative and shut down in 2021, effective in 2022.

== History ==
=== Beginning ===
Meta Inc., formerly Sciencescape Inc., was founded in 2010 by Sam and Amy Molyneux. Before co-founding Meta, Sam Molyneux studied cancer genomics at the Ontario Cancer Institute at Princess Margaret Hospital in Toronto. Molyneux developed the idea from his experience as a researcher, when he discovered that similar research findings had been published while he was working on related projects. The service was developed with the intention of curating the millions of articles in the area of academic publishing.

The company was headquartered in Redwood City, California (formerly Toronto, Ontario, Canada) and operated Meta Science, a literature discovery platform.

The company initially focused on developing AI-powered knowledge tools to help researchers navigate the overwhelming volume of scientific publications. The platform was designed to address information overload in modern scientific research.

As of September 2016, Meta had analyzed over 26 million papers and profiled 14 million researchers. Using natural language processing, Meta scanned articles - as well as the millions of articles stored in open-access repositories - collecting information about authors, citations and topics. Participating publishers receive exposure for their journals in return. These include the American Medical Association, BioMed Central, Elsevier, Karger, SAGE Publishing, Taylor & Francis, Wolters Kluwer, and the Royal Society. The technology for the platform was developed via a joint partnership between Meta and SRI International.

IARPA FUSE program commercialization

Meta Inc.'s technology foundation was significantly enhanced through its commercialization of SRI International’s machine learning research developed under the Intelligence Advanced Research Projects Activity (IARPA) Foresight and Understanding from Scientific Exposition (FUSE) program.

=== Merge with Chan Zuckerberg Initiative ===
Meta merged with the Chan Zuckerberg Initiative in 2017, marking the initiative's first acquisition.

=== Shutdown ===
On October 28, 2021, the Chan Zuckerberg Initiative announced the sunset of Meta, with a proposed shutdown date of March 31, 2022.

== Features and specifications ==
Meta includes coverage of the biomedical sciences with real-time updates from PubMed and other sources. The website provides access to over 22 million papers with publication dates as early as the 1800s. By sifting through papers and learning from user behavior, the service pinpoints key pieces of research and provides relevant search results. Meta also provides visualizations about a field of research by organizing papers by their date of publication and citation count and then presenting the information in a way that allows users to quickly identify key historical papers.

The Meta Science research platform uses algorithms that allow users to sort new publications according to subject matter. Users can subscribe to feeds for areas of research including biology, genes, diseases, genetic disorders, drugs, people, labs and institutes, and journals.
