= John Jacob Abel =

American biochemist and pharmacologist (1857–1938)

John Jacob Abel FRS
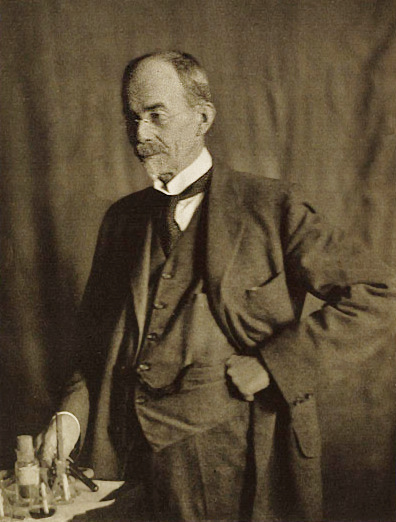
- Born: May 19, 1857; Cleveland, Ohio, U.S.
- Died: May 26, 1938 (aged 81)
- Education: University of Michigan (PhB); University of Strasbourg (MD)
- Spouse: Mary Hinman (m. 1883)
- Children: 3
- Awards: Willard Gibbs Award (1927)
- Scientific career
- Fields: Biochemistry, pharmacology
- Workplaces: Johns Hopkins School of Medicine

Signature
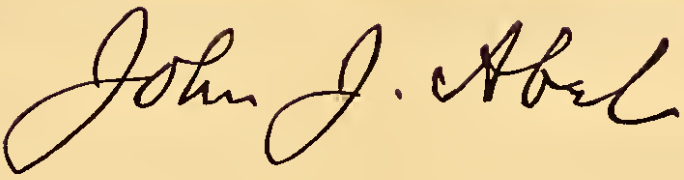

John Jacob Abel (19 May 1857 – 26 May 1938) was an American biochemist and pharmacologist. He established the pharmacology department at Johns Hopkins University School of Medicine in 1893, and then became America's first full-time professor of pharmacology. During his time at Hopkins, he made several important medical advancements, especially in the field of hormone extraction. In addition to his laboratory work, he founded several significant scientific journals such as the Journal of Biological Chemistry and the Journal of Pharmacology and Experimental Therapeutics.

== Early life and education ==
John Jacob Abel was born in 1857 near Cleveland, Ohio, to German immigrants George M. and Mary (Becker) Abel. He earned his Ph.B. (Bachelor of Philosophy) from the University of Michigan where he studied under Henry Sewall in 1883. But, during this time he took several years off to serve as a principal of the high school in La Porte, Indiana. There he taught many subjects ranging from chemistry and physics to Latin. He then went to Johns Hopkins University, where he studied under Henry Newell Martin, a cardiac physiologist and professor of biology. He then left for Europe, starting in Leipzig studying medical sciences, then traveling to Strasbourg where he was about to receive his Ph.D., but instead decided to receive an M.D. in 1888 from the University of Strasbourg.

After his doctorate, Abel worked mostly in clinical studies and took clinical courses, focusing on biochemistry and pharmacology. He traveled around Europe, mostly in Germany and central Europe, conducting research in biochemistry. During this time, Abel had a number of mentors that inspired his work and exposed him to a number of disciplines that eventually prompted him to work in biochemistry and pharmacology. Starting in 1884, Abel worked with doctors Ludwig von Frey in physiology and histology, Rudolf Boehm in pharmacology, Adolph Strümpell in pathology, and Johannes Wislicenus in organic and inorganic chemistry. All of this work was done in Leipzig until 1886, until Abel moved on to Strasbourg, where he again worked in various fields: internal medicine with Adolph Kussmaul, and Friedrich Daniel von Recklinghausen in infectious disease and pathology. Eventually, Abel moved back to Strasbourg where he worked more with Oswald Schmiedeberg among others. Schmeidberg, however, sparked his interest in pharmacological research. Lastly, he worked in a biochemical laboratory in Berne, where he met one Arthur Robertson Cushny, who eventually worked with him at Michigan.

== Career ==
Finishing his time in Europe, Abel returned to the University of Michigan as the chair of Materia Medica and Therapeutics. There, he played an important role in developing the first pharmacology department in North America. He only was at the University of Michigan until 1893, when William Osler of Johns Hopkins School of Medicine asked Abel to come to the school and accept a Professorship of Pharmacology.

At Johns Hopkins, Abel was the chair of pharmacology and biological chemistry, until the departments split in 1908, when Abel became the chair solely of the Department of Pharmacology. At Johns Hopkins, Abel performed his most groundbreaking research and held the position of chair of the department until he retired at the age of 75 in 1932.

=== Isolation of epinephrine ===
Ever since his early years in Europe, Abel showed great interest in isolating pure form of internal gland hormones. The first work that led to his international reputation as a pharmacologist and biochemist was the isolation of epinephrine from adrenal medulla. However, he was only able to isolate a monobenzoyl derivative of epinephrine. While he was improving his processes on decomposing the benzoyl derivative to obtain salts of epinephrine using saponification, a Japanese chemist J. Takamine, who had visited his lab, was able to successfully isolate the neutral base of epinephrine by adding ammonium to highly concentrated extract, a method Abel himself tried but failed due to the use of low concentration of extract. After Takamine's success, Abel himself remarked, with great candor, "The efforts of years on my part in this once mysterious field of suprarenal, medullary biochemistry, marred by blunders as they were, eventuated, then, in the isolation of the hormone not in the form of the free base but in that of its monobenzoyl derivative."

=== Devising early form of dialysis machine ===
Together with L.G. Rowntree and B.B. Turner, Abel devised what they called a "vividiffusion" apparatus, consisting of a series of tubes surrounded by fluid. They first demonstrated the apparatus at the Physiological Congress in Groningen in 1914. By allowing arterial blood to enter at one end of the connection, and later return to circulation through the venous connection after dialysis, they were able to demonstrate the existence of free amino acids in blood. By isolating these amino acids from blood circulation, Abel conducted various subsequent researches on the structure of proteins in the blood. Not only did Abel use the apparatus for his research work, he also realized the great clinical potential such dialysis machine would have on managing the damaging effects of renal failure. The vividiffusion apparatus Abel devised is the precursor to the modern day dialysis machine. He summarized his work in a paper published in 1913, "On the Removal of Diffusable Substances from the Circulating Blood by Means of Dialysis" by Transfusion Science.

=== Crystallization of insulin ===
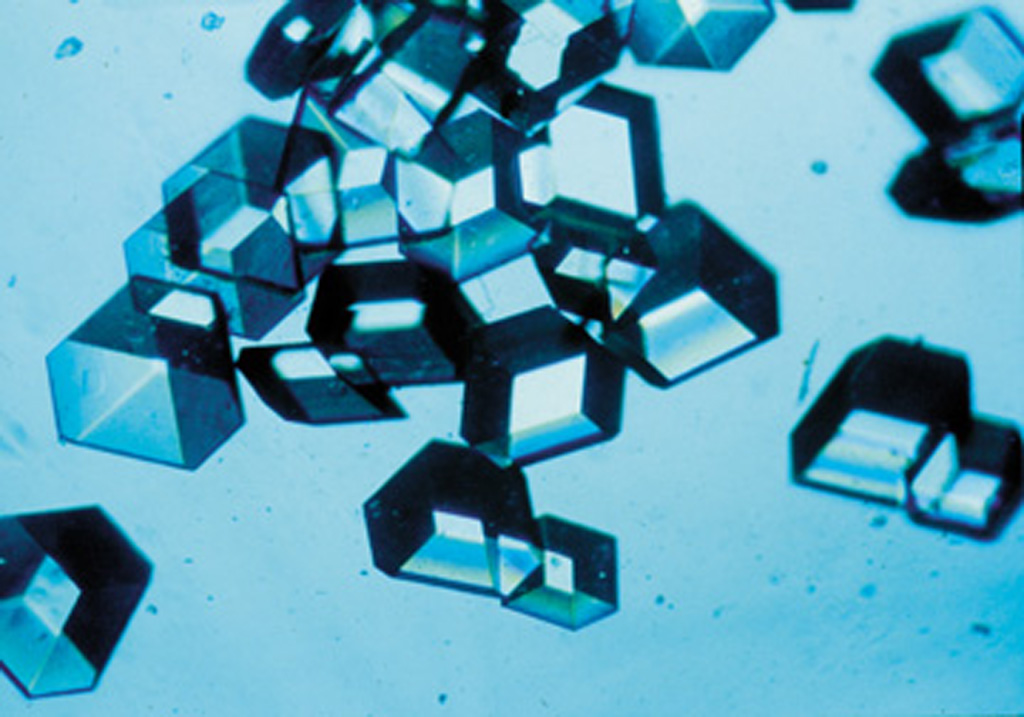
Insulin crystals

Abel's work on insulin started with an invitation from his old friend Arthur A. Noyes at California Institute of Technology. Noyes had just received a grant from the Carnegie Corporation for research on insulin, and he thought that Abel would be the right person to lead that research. After some preliminary experiments on the subject, Abel decided to take on the research, and replied to his friend, "Will attack insulin. Writing. J. J. Abel." Abel invested the next few years on purifying insulin. While he was trying various means to purify insulin, he had the idea to measure sulfur content of his extracts and found that the higher the sulfur content, the greater the activity. The discovery not only significantly precipitated progress on extracting active fractions but also offered the very first concrete information on the structure of insulin—sulfur is an integral part of insulin molecules. Continuing with his research on extracting insulin, in November 1925, Abel finally was able to witness one of the most beautiful sights of his life, "glistening crystals of insulin forming on the sides of a test tube". While at the California Institute of Technology, Abel completed an article in the proceedings of the National Academy of Sciences entitled "Crystalline Insulin" in 1926. Although Abel's work received great compliments from the media and the science community, some doubted the purity of his crystals as preliminary tests revealed that they were in fact proteins. The test result was contrary to the dominant view at the time on proteins—proteins were considered as unlikely to have such highly specific physiological activity shown by a hormone such as insulin. In 1927, he was published in the journal Science for this work with a paper entitled "Chemistry in Relation to Biology and Medicine with Especial Reference to Insulin and Other Hormones". At the time, Abel's laboratory was no doubt the center of insulin research in the United States. A lot of young scientists came to his lab and worked under Abel to study the newly crystallized hormone. Abel himself gradually withdrew from the actual experimental work on insulin after the first four years, but he continued to guide the scientists in his lab to unravel more and more about the structure of insulin molecule.

=== Founding scientific journals ===
Despite his great dedication to experimentation work, Abel's historical significance is certainly not restricted to his research work. He was also the founder of a number of influential scientific journals. As more and more research was conducted in the field of biochemistry, Abel realized the importance of having a platform that allowed scientists all around the world to publish their work and report on their findings. He therefore asked his friend Dr. C. A. Herter, Professor of Pharmacology at Columbia University, for help on founding a scientific journal on biochemistry. Together as joint editors, Abel and Herter established the Journal of Biological Chemistry. The first issue of the journal appeared in 1905. Motivated by the very same goal of trying to create an outlet for a wide dissemination of new scientific findings, he later founded the Journal of Pharmacology and Experimental Therapeutics in 1908.

=== Publications ===
- Abel JJ, Rowntree LG, Turner BB. Plasma removal with return of corpuscles (plasmaphaeresis). The Journal of Pharmacology and experimental therapeutics Vol. V. No. 6, July, 1914. Transfusion Science. 11: 166-77.
- Abel JJ, Rowntree LG, Turner BB. On the removal of diffusable substances from the circulating blood by means of dialysis. Transactions of the Association of American Physicians, 1913. Transfusion Science. 11: 164-5.
- Abel JJ. Chemistry in Relation to Biology and Medicine with Especial Reference to Insulin and Other Hormones. Science, 1927. Science. 66: 337-346.
- Abel JJ. Arthur Robertson Cushny And Pharmacology. Science, 1926. Science. 63: 507-515.
- Abel JJ. Crystalline Insulin. 1926. Proceedings of the National Academy of Sciences of the United States of America. 12 (2): 132-136.
- Abel JJ. Experimental and Chemical Studies of the Blood with an Appeal for more Extended Chemical Training for the Biological and Medical Investigator. Science. 1915. Science. 42: 135-147.
- Abel JJ. Experimental and Chemical Studies of the Blood with an Appeal for more Extended Chemical Training for the Biological and Medical Investigator. II. Science. 1915. Science. 42: 165-178.

== Degrees, awards, honors ==
=== Degrees ===
- Ph.B. (Bachelor of Philosophy) from University of Michigan, 1883
- M.D. (Doctor of Medicine) from University of Strassburg, 1888

==== Honorary degrees ====
- M.A. (Master of Arts) from University of Michigan, 1903
- Sc.D. (Doctor of Science) from University of Michigan, 1912
- Sc.D. (Doctor of Science) from University of Pittsburgh, 1915
- LL.D. (Doctor of Law) from University of Cambridge, 1920
- Sc.D. (Doctor of Science) from Harvard University, 1925
- Sc.D. (Doctor of Science) from Yale University, 1927
- M.D. (Doctor of Medicine) from University of Lviv, Poland, 1927
- LL.D. (Doctor of Law) from University of Aberdeen, 1932

=== Awards ===
- Research Corporation Prize, 1925
- Lectureship of Kober Foundation, 1925
- Willard Gibbs Gold Medal by the Chicago Section of the American Chemical Society, 1927
- Gold Medal, Society of Apothecaries, London, 1928
- Conné Medal, New York Chemists' Club, 1932
- Kober Medal, 1934

=== Honors ===
- Elected Member of the United States National Academy of Sciences, 1912
- Elected Member of the American Philosophical Society, 1857

== Private life ==
Abel married Mary Hinman in 1883. They met while he was a principal and she was a school teacher in La Porte, Indiana. They had three children, one of whom was a daughter who died as an infant in 1888 in Strasbourg. The other two, George H. Abel and Robert Abel of Philadelphia and Boston, respectively, survived into adulthood. Mary Abel and John Abel both passed in 1938; Mary in January and John in May due to a coronary thrombosis.
