= Robert Lefkowitz =

American physician and biochemist

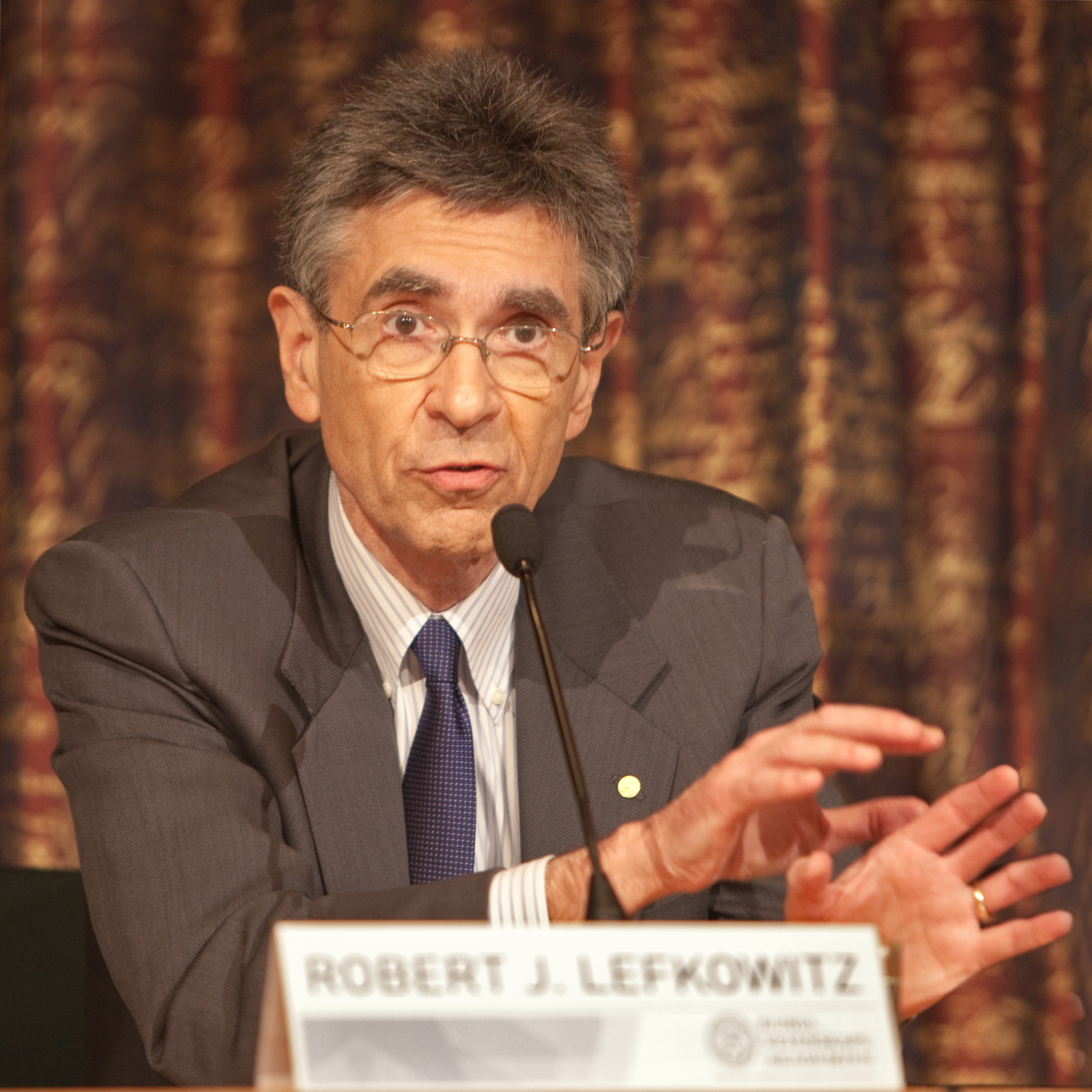
- Lefkowitz in Stockholm 2012
- Born: Robert Joseph Lefkowitz; April 15, 1943 (age 83); The Bronx, New York, US
- Education: Columbia University
- Known for: G protein coupled receptors beta-arrestins
- Spouse(s): Arna Brandel (divorced) Lynn Tilley (m. 1991)
- Awards: National Medal of Science (2007); BBVA Foundation Frontiers of Knowledge Award (2009); Nobel Prize in Chemistry (2012)
- Scientific career
- Fields: Receptor Biology; Biochemistry
- Workplaces: Duke University; Howard Hughes Medical Institute
- Notable students: Brian Kobilka, Jeffrey Benovic, Michel Bouvier, Marc G. Caron, Richard A. Cerione, Henrik Dohlman, Walter J. Koch, Lee Limbird, Martin J. Lohse, Gang Pei, Lewis "Rusty" Williams, R. Sanders Williams

Robert Joseph Lefkowitz (born April 15, 1943) is an American physician (internist and cardiologist) and biochemist. He is best known for his discoveries that reveal the inner workings of an important family of G protein-coupled receptors, for which he was awarded the 2012 Nobel Prize for Chemistry with Brian Kobilka. He is currently an Investigator with the Howard Hughes Medical Institute as well as a James B. Duke Professor of Medicine and Professor of Biochemistry and Chemistry at Duke University.

== Early life ==
Lefkowitz was born on April 15, 1943, in The Bronx, New York to Jewish parents Max and Rose Lefkowitz. Their families had emigrated to the United States from Poland in the late 19th century.

After graduating from the Bronx High School of Science in 1959, he attended Columbia College from which he received a Bachelor of Arts in chemistry in 1962. At Columbia, Lefkowitz studied under Ronald Breslow.

He graduated from Columbia University College of Physicians and Surgeons in 1966 with an M.D. degree. After serving an internship and one year of general medical residency at the College of Physicians and Surgeons, he served as clinical and research associate at the National Institutes of Health from 1968 to 1970.

== Career ==
Upon completing his medical residency and research and clinical training in 1973, he was appointed associate professor of medicine and assistant professor of biochemistry at the Duke University Medical Center. In 1977, he was promoted to professor of medicine and in 1982 to James B. Duke Professor of Medicine at Duke University. He is also a professor of biochemistry and a professor of chemistry. He has been an investigator of the Howard Hughes Medical Institute since 1976 and was an established investigator of the American Heart Association from 1973 to 1976.

Lefkowitz studies receptor biology and signal transduction and is most well known for his detailed characterizations of the sequence, structure and function of the β-adrenergic and related receptors and for the discovery and characterization of the two families of proteins which regulate them, the G protein-coupled receptor (GPCR) kinases and β-arrestins.

Lefkowitz made a remarkable contribution in the mid-1980s when he and his colleagues cloned the gene first for the β-adrenergic receptor, and then rapidly thereafter, for a total of 8 adrenergic receptors (receptors for adrenaline and noradrenaline). This led to the seminal discovery that all GPCRs (which include the β-adrenergic receptor) have a very similar molecular structure. The structure is defined by an amino acid sequence which weaves its way back and forth across the plasma membrane seven times. Today we know that about 1,000 receptors in the human body belong to this same family. The importance of this is that all of these receptors use the same basic mechanisms so that pharmaceutical researchers now understand how to effectively target the largest receptor family in the human body. Today, as many as 30 to 50 percent of all prescription drugs are designed to "fit" like keys into the similarly structured locks of Lefkowitz' receptors—everything from anti-histamines to ulcer drugs to beta blockers that help relieve hypertension, angina and coronary disease. Lefkowitz is among the most highly cited researchers in the fields of biology, biochemistry, pharmacology, toxicology, and clinical medicine according to Thomson-ISI.

== Personal life ==
Lefkowitz is married to Lynn (née Tilley). He has five children and six grandchildren. He was previously married to Arna Brandel.

In 2021, Lefkowitz published a memoir entitled A Funny Thing Happened on the Way to Stockholm: The Adrenaline-Fueled Adventures of an Accidental Scientist. This book was co-authored by Randy Hall, who was a post-doctoral fellow in the Lefkowitz lab in the 1990s. The book describes Lefkowitz's early life, training as a physician, and tenure in the United States Public Health Service (the "Yellow Berets" of the NIH), which began as a means of fulfilling his draft obligation during the Vietnam War but ultimately ignited a lifelong passion for research. The second half of the book describes Lefkowitz's research career and various adventures both before and after his Nobel Prize win. Upon publication in February 2021, the book was named as "New & Noteworthy" by The New York Times and "one of the week's best science picks" by Nature.

== Awards ==
Lefkowitz has received numerous awards including:

- 2014 Golden Plate Award of the American Academy of Achievement
- 2012 Nobel Prize in Chemistry (shared with Brian Kobilka)
- 2009 BBVA Foundation Frontiers of Knowledge Award, in the Biomedicine Category.
- 2009 Research Achievement Award, American Heart Association
- 2007 National Medal of Science
- 2007 The Shaw Prize in Life Science and Medicine
- 2007 Albany Medical Center Prize in Medicine and Biomedical Research
- 2006 American Heart Association Eugene Braunwald Academic Mentorship Award
- 2003 Fondation Lefoulon – Delalande Grand Prix for Science – Institut de France
- 2001 Jessie Stevenson Kovalenko Medal of the USA – The National Academy of Sciences
- 1992 Bristol-Myers Squibb Award for Distinguished Achievement In Cardiovascular Research
- 1988 Gairdner Foundation International Award
- 1978 John Jacob Abel Award in Pharmacology

== See also ==
- List of Jewish Nobel laureates

Awards
Preceded by Dan Shechtman	Nobel Prize in Chemistry laureate 2012; With: Brian Kobilka	Succeeded by Michael Levitt; Martin Karplus; Arieh Warshel
