= American Society for Pharmacology and Experimental Therapeutics =

Scientific society

- Formation: 1908
- Headquarters: Rockville, MD
- Location: United States
- Members: 4,800
- Official language: English
- President: Michael F. Jarvis
- Key people: Dave Jackson (executive officer)
- Staff: 17
- Website: http://www.aspet.org/

The American Society for Pharmacology and Experimental Therapeutics (ASPET) is a scientific society founded in late 1908 by John Jacob Abel of Johns Hopkins University (also the founder of the American Society for Biochemistry and Molecular Biology), with the aim of promoting the growth of pharmacological research. Many society members are researchers in basic and clinical pharmacology who help develop disease-fighting medications and therapeutics. ASPET is one of the constituent societies of the Federation of American Societies for Experimental Biology (FASEB). The society's headquarters are in Rockville, MD. The current president is Michael F. Jarvis.

== Publications ==
The society publishes three research journals and a review journal: the Journal of Pharmacology and Experimental Therapeutics, Drug Metabolism and Disposition, Molecular Pharmacology, and Pharmacological Reviews

Starting in 2012 these publications are only offered online. The society copublishes a wholly open access journal with the British Pharmacological Society and Wiley entitled Pharmacology Research & Perspectives.

ASPET also publishes a quarterly newsletter, The Pharmacologist, and, from 2001 to 2011, Molecular Interventions magazine.

== Awards ==
The society gives out several awards:

- John J. Abel Award
- Julius Axelrod Award
- Pharmacia-ASPET Award in Experimental Therapeutics
- Robert R. Ruffolo Career Achievement Award
- Travel Award for Pharmacology Educators
- Bernard B. Brodie Award in Drug Metabolism
- P.B. Dews Lifetime Achievement Award for Research in Behavioral Pharmacology
- Drug Metabolism Early Career Achievement Award
- Goodman and Gilman Award in Receptor Pharmacology
- Benedict R. Lucchesi Distinguished Lectureship in Cardiac Pharmacology
- Torald Sollmann Award in Pharmacology
- Paul M. Vanhoutte Distinguished Lectureship in Cardiovascular Pharmacology

Travel awards to participate in its meetings are also given to students and postdocs.

== See also ==
- Chemotherapy
- Clinical pharmacology
- Drug metabolism
- Neuropharmacology
- Pharmacology
- Toxicology
