= Hermann Vetter =

German academic and translator (born c. 1933)

Hermann Vetter (born c. 1933) is a German academic and translator who has made many works of English-language philosophy available in German. He specialized in sociology of knowledge and social psychology. His academic career was interrupted by the "student revolutions" of the 1960s.

== Bibliography ==
=== As translator ===
- Karl R. Popper, Objektive Erkenntnis. Ein evolutionärer Entwurf (Objective Knowledge: An Evolutionary Approach). Hoffmann und Campe, 1974.
- Robert Nozick, Anarchie, Staat, Utopia (Anarchy, State, and Utopia). Moderne Verlags Gesellschaft, 1976.
- Thomas S. Kuhn, Die Struktur wissenschaftlicher Revolutionen (The Structure of Scientific Revolutions). Suhrkamp, 1976. With Kurt Simon.
- Michael Sukale (ed.), Moderne Sprachphilosophie. Hoffmann und Campe, 1976.
- W. V. O. Quine, Die Wurzeln der Referenz (The Roots of Reference). Suhrkamp, 1976.
- Thomas S. Kuhn, Die Entstehung des Neuen: Studien zur Struktur der Wissenschaftsgeschichte (The Essential Tension: Selected Studies in Scientific Tradition and Change). Suhrkamp, 1978.
- Erving Goffman, Rahmen-Analyse (Frame Analysis). Suhrkamp, 1979.
- John Rawls, Eine Theorie der Gerechtigkeit (A Theory of Justice). Suhrkamp, 1979.
- Paul Feyerabend, Wider den Methodenzwang. Skizzen einer anarchistischen Erkenntnistheorie (Against Method). Suhrkamp, 1983.
- Anthony Kenny, Wittgenstein. Suhrkamp Verlag, 1989.
- Anthony Kenny, ed., Illustrierte Geschichte der westlichen Philosophie (The Oxford Illustrated History of Western Philosophy). Campus Verlag, 1995.
- Peter Singer, Wie sollen wir leben? Ethik in einer egoistischen Zeit (How Are We to Live?). Harald Fischer, 1996.
- Will Kymlicka, Politische Philosophie heute: Eine Einführung (Contemporary Political Philosophy: An Introduction). Campus, 1997.
- Richard Rorty, Stolz auf unser Land. Die amerikanische Linke und der Patriotismus (Achieving Our Country). Suhrkamp, 1999.
- Robert Brandom, Expressive Vernunft: Begründung, Repräsentation und diskursive Festlegung (Making It Explicit). Suhrkamp, 2000. With Eva Gilmer.

=== As author ===
- Hermann Vetter, Wahrscheinlichkeit und Logischer Spielraum - Eine Untersuchung zur induktiven Logik. Mohr. 1967.
- Hermann Vetter, "Logical Probability, Mathematical Statistics, and the Problem of Induction". Synthese 20 (1) 1969:56 - 71.
- Hermann Vetter, "The Production of Children as a Problem of Utilitarian Ethics". Inquiry 12 (1–4) 1969:445-447.
- Hermann Vetter, "Utilitarianism and New Generations". Mind 80 (318) 1971:301-302.
