= Monash Bioethics Centre =

Australian research centre

The Centre for Human Bioethics is the previous name of a research and teaching centre at Monash University, based in the Faculty of Arts. The centre is now known as the Monash Bioethics Centre. It focusses on the branch of ethics known as bioethics, a field relating to biological science and medicine. It was founded in October 1980 by Professors Peter Singer and Helga Kuhse, as the first centre in Australia devoted to bioethics, and one of the first in the world.

It became well known during the 1980s as one of the leading bodies studying the ethical implications of the rapid advances in science and technology, such as in-vitro fertilisation. The centre's founder, Peter Singer, is probably the world's best-known bioethicist, and while director of the centre, he produced a number of ground-breaking publications in the field. This included The Reproduction Revolution, Should the Baby Live? and Practical Ethics. He also founded the journal Bioethics with Helga Kuhse, and established the International Association for Bioethics.

Today, it continues its strong focus on research, but also provides undergraduate, postgraduate and industry-based education. It undertakes extensive teaching to health professionals. It is particularly well known for its Master of Bioethics degree, founded in 1989 as one of the first of its kind in the world. In June 2014, the length of this course was increased to become a two-year full-time course. The current director of the centre is Doctor John Gardner. Previous to this, Professor Catherine Mills was director, also preceded by Professor Michael Selgelid, and Associate Professor Justin Oakley, a virtue ethicist who was one of the first graduates of the centre's Master of Bioethics program.

In addition to their teaching and research commitments, staff from the centre also carry out consultancy work for numerous government bodies and law reform agencies, including the World Health Organization. The centre has been influential in shaping public debate on issues such as assisted reproduction, surrogate motherhood, and end-of-life decision-making. The centre is also home to the Monash Bioethics Review, the only peer-reviewed bioethics journal in Australia.

The centre is part of an international network established by the University of Tokyo to promote collaborative research and teaching links between eight of the world's leading bioethics centres, including the Hastings Centre in New York and the Ethox Centre at Oxford University.

== Notable past and present staff ==
- Peter Singer - Co-founder, now Ira W. DeCamp Professor of Bioethics at Princeton University and laureate professor at the Centre for Applied Philosophy and Public Ethics at the University of Melbourne
- Helga Kuhse - Co-founder and current senior honorary research fellow
- Justin Oakley - Previous director
- Michael Selgelid - Previous director
- Catherine Mills - Previous director
- John Gardner - Current director
- Julian Savulescu - Sir Louis Matheson Distinguished Visiting Professor, also Uehiro Professor of Practical Ethics at the University of Oxford and director of the Oxford Uehiro Centre for Practical Ethics
- Chin Liew Ten - Former director, now professor at the National University of Singapore
