= Justin Oakley =

Australian moral philosopher (born 1960)

- Born: 1960

Philosophical work
- Era: Contemporary philosophy
- Region: Western Philosophy
- School: Analytic
- Main interests: Ethics; Virtue ethics; Bioethics
- Notable ideas: True Friendship Professional Ethics

Justin Oakley is a bioethicist and moral philosopher. He has been part of the revival of the ethical doctrine known as virtue ethics, an Aristotelian doctrine which has received renewed interest in the past few decades.

Oakley is particularly well known for his work on professional ethics and also the so-called 'problem' of friendship. The problem of friendship looks at how a strict application of impartialist ethical doctrines, such as utilitarianism and Kantianism, conflicts with our notions of friendship or 'true friendship'. In 1995, he published, with Dean Cocking, the now widely cited article "Indirect Consequentialism, Friendship, and the Problem of Alienation" in the journal Ethics.

== Education ==
Oakley was educated at Sydney Road Community School, Brunswick, and studied his Bachelor of Arts at Swinburne University of Technology, graduating in 1981. He completed his PhD in Philosophy at La Trobe University in 1988. He teaches in the Master of Bioethics program run by Monash University Centre for Human Bioethics.

== Work and awards ==
Oakley joined the Centre for Human Bioethics at Monash University (established by colleague Peter Singer) in 1990 and served as its Director for 13 years, from 1999 to 2012. In February 2012, he became Deputy Director to spend more time on his research.

In 2004, he was awarded the Eureka Prize for Research in Ethics.

== Personal life ==
Oakley supports the Australian Rules Football team the Geelong football club. Oakley's father is the writer Barry Oakley.

== Publications ==
Books authored or edited:

- Informed Consent and Clinician Accountability The Ethics of Report Cards on Surgeon Performance, Cambridge, Cambridge University Press, 2007 (co-edited with Steve Clarke).
- Bioethics (International Library of Essays in Public and Professional Ethics), Aldershot, Ashgate, 2006 (edited collection).
- Virtue Ethics and Professional Roles, Cambridge, Cambridge University Press, 2001 (pbk. 2005) (with Dean Cocking).
- Morality and the Emotions, London, Routledge, 1992 (re-issue 2020).
