= Mutual Aid: A Factor of Evolution =

1902 essay collection by Peter Kropotkin

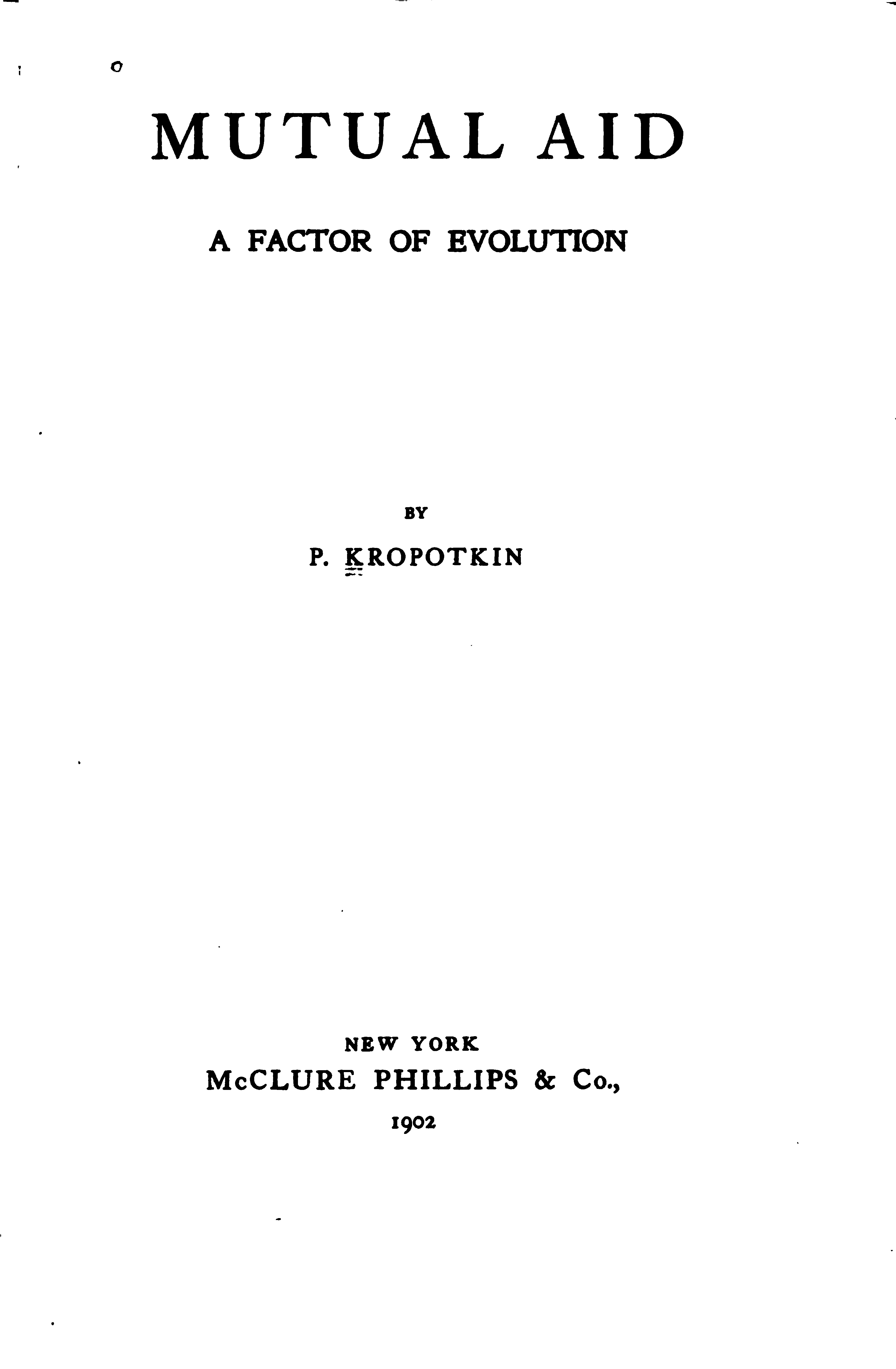
- The cover of the 1902 edition of Mutual Aid
- Author: Peter Kropotkin
- Language: English
- Subject: Mutual Aid
- Published: 1902
- Publisher: McClure Phillips & Co.
- Text: Mutual Aid: A Factor of Evolution at Wikisource

Mutual Aid: A Factor of Evolution is a 1902 collection of anthropological essays by Russian naturalist and anarchist philosopher Peter Kropotkin. The essays, initially published in the English periodical The Nineteenth Century between 1890 and 1896, explore the role of mutually beneficial cooperation and reciprocity (or "mutual aid") in the animal kingdom and human societies both past and present. It is an argument against theories of social Darwinism that emphasize competition and survival of the fittest, and against the romantic depictions by writers such as Jean-Jacques Rousseau, who thought that cooperation was motivated by universal love. Instead, Kropotkin argues that mutual aid has pragmatic advantages for the survival of human and animal communities and, along with the conscience, has been promoted through natural selection.

Mutual Aid is considered a fundamental text in anarchist communism. It presents a scientific basis for communism as an alternative to the historical materialism of the Marxists. Kropotkin considers the importance of mutual aid for prosperity and survival in the animal kingdom, in indigenous and early European societies, in the medieval free cities (especially through the guilds), and in the late 19th century village, labor movement, and impoverished people. He criticizes the State for destroying historically important mutual aid institutions, particularly through the imposition of private property.

Many biologists (including Stephen Jay Gould, one of the most influential evolutionary biologists of his generation) also consider it an important catalyst in the scientific study of cooperation.

== Content ==
Kropotkin emphasizes the distinction between competitive struggle between individual organisms over limited resources and collective struggle between organisms and the environment. He drew from his firsthand observations of Siberia and Northeast Asia, where he saw that animal populations were limited not by food sources, which were abundant, but rather by harsh weather. For example, predatory birds may compete by stealing food from one another while migratory birds cooperate in order to survive harsh winters by traveling long distances. He did not deny the competitive form of struggle but argued that the cooperative counterpart has been under-emphasized: "There is an immense amount of warfare and extermination going on amidst various species; there is, at the same time, as much, or perhaps even more, of mutual support, mutual aid, and mutual defense... Sociability is as much a law of nature as mutual struggle."

Kropotkin's ideas expressed the now recognized importance of mutualism (a beneficial relationship between two different species) and altruism (when one member of a species aids another) in biology. Examples of altruism in animals include kin selection and reciprocal altruism.

== Reception ==
Daniel P. Todes, in his account of Russian naturalism in the 19th century, concludes that Kropotkin's work "cannot be dismissed as the idiosyncratic product of an anarchist dabbling in biology" and that his views "were but one expression of a broad current in Russian evolutionary thought that pre-dated, indeed encouraged, his work on the subject and was by no means confined to leftist thinkers."

As a description of biology, Kropotkin's perspective is consistent with contemporary understanding. Stephen Jay Gould admired Kropotkin's observations, noting that cooperation, if it increases individual survival, is not ruled out by natural selection, and is in fact encouraged. Douglas H. Boucher places Kropotkin's book as a precursor to the development of the biological theory of altruism.

== Editions ==
- Mutual Aid: A Factor of Evolution. Boston: Extending Horizons Books, Porter Sargent Publishers. 2005 [1955]. ISBN 0-87558-024-6. Includes Kropotkin's 1914 preface, Foreword and Bibliography by Ashley Montagu, and The Struggle for Existence, by Thomas H. Huxley
- Mutual Aid: A Factor of Evolution (2009 paperback ed.). London: Freedom Press. 14 April 2011. ISBN 978-1-90449-110-1.
- Mutual Aid: An Illuminated Factor of Evolution (2021 paperback/hardcover ed.). California: PM Press. 14 September 2021. ISBN 978-1-62963-874-4. Includes Introduction by David Graeber and Andrej Grubaac, Foreword by Ruth Kinna, Postscript by GATS, Afterword by Allan Antliff, and illustrations by N.O.Bonzo

== See also ==
- A Darwinian Left: Politics, Evolution and Cooperation
- Ethology
- Evolutionary anthropology
- List of books about anarchism
- Psychological egoism
