= Michael Selgelid =

American bioethicist

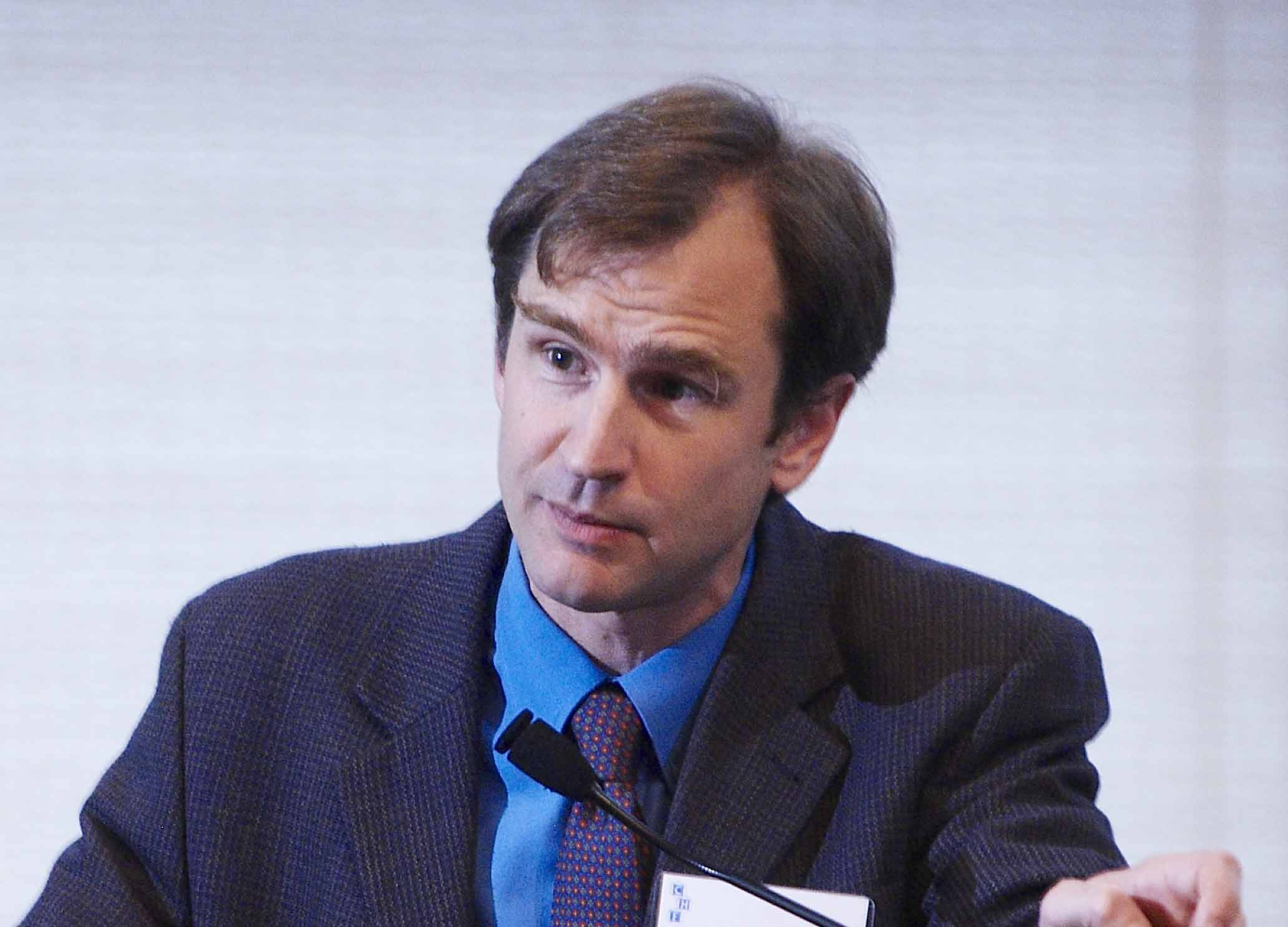
- Michael Selgelid, 2008 Cain Conference
- Born: United States

Philosophical work
- Era: Contemporary philosophy
- Region: Western Philosophy
- School: Analytic
- Main interests: Ethics; Bioethics

External videos
- "Dual Use Bioethics", Michael Selgelid, Department of Peace Studies, University of Bradford

Michael J. Selgelid is a bioethicist and moral philosopher who has written on ethics and public health, biotechnology, and infectious diseases. He is the current director of the Centre for Human Bioethics at Monash University and of the World Health Organization Collaborating Centre for Bioethics therein.

== Education ==
Selgelid studied a Bachelor of Science in Biomedical Engineering at Duke University, and completed his PhD in Philosophy at the University of California, San Diego under the supervision of Philip Kitcher.

== Work and awards ==
While the completing his PhD in San Diego, Selgelid became a research fellow at the European Academy (Europaische Akademie), Bad Neuenahr-Ahrweiler, Germany. In 2003 he worked at the University of Witwatersrand in South Africa and spent time at the University of Murcia in Spain. In 2005 he joined the Centre for Values, Ethics and the Law in Medicine at the University of Sydney, Australia, and in 2006 he became a senior research fellow at the Centre for Applied Philosophy and Public Ethics at the Australian National University (ANU) in Canberra. At ANU he also was the Deputy Director of the National Centre for Biosecurity. Since 2006, Selgelid continued to be involved with the University of Sydney as an Honorary Lecturer.

Selgelid joined the Centre for Human Bioethics at Monash University in 2011, becoming its director.

His work in bioethics, specifically in biosecurity and global health, has been recognised by organisations such as the World Health Organization (WHO) and Department of Prime Minister and Cabinet, Australia. During the 2014 Ebola Crisis, Selgelid advised the WHO. The Monash University's Centre for Human Bioethics has been named a WHO Collaborating Centre for Bioethics.

In 2004, he was a finalist for the Mark S. Ehrenreich Prize in Healthcare Ethics Research, and has been awarded multiple research fellowships to the Brocher Foundation in Geneva, Switzerland.

== Publications ==
Selected books authored or edited include:

- Ethical and Philosophical Consideration of the Dual-Use Dilemma in the Biological Sciences, Dordrecht, NE: Springer, 2008 (with Seumas Miller).
- Emergency Ethics Farnham, UK: Ashgate, 2012 (co-edited with A. M. Viens).
- On the Dual Uses of Science and Ethics: Principles, Practices, and Prospects, Canberra: ANU E Press, 2013 (co-edited with Brian Rappert).
