= How Ethical Is Australia? =

How Ethical is Australia? An Examination of Australia's Record as a Global Citizen
- Cover of the first edition
- Authors: Peter Singer, Tom Gregg
- Language: English
- Subject: Politics of Australia
- Publisher: Black Inc
- Publication date: 2004
- Publication place: Australia
- Media type: Print (Hardcover)
- Pages: 208
- ISBN: 978-1-863-95317-7

How Ethical is Australia? An Examination of Australia's Record as a Global Citizen is a 2004 book by Peter Singer and Tom Gregg, in which the authors apply moral philosophy to examine Australia's domestic, environmental and foreign policies.
