= Katarzyna de Lazari-Radek =

Polish utilitarian philosopher

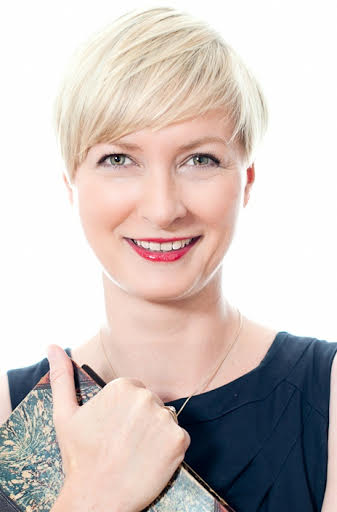
- Lazari-Radek in 2014
- Born: 7 August 1975 (age 51)

Education
- Education: University of Łódź

Philosophical work
- Era: Contemporary philosophy
- Region: Western philosophy
- School: Analytic philosophy · Utilitarianism
- Main interests: Ethics

Katarzyna de Lazari-Radek (born 7 August 1975) is a Polish utilitarian philosopher and a university professor at the Institute of Philosophy at University of Łódź.

She has also taught at a summer seminar on utilitarian ethics at the European Graduate School and Spring School for PhD students at the Dutch Research School of Philosophy. She is best known for her collaborations with the Australian philosopher Peter Singer.

In their 2012, 2014 and 2016 collaborations she and Singer set out to explain and defend act utilitarianism and suggest a resolution to what the late 19th century British philosopher Henry Sidgwick called “the profoundest problem of ethics", the apparent rationality of both ethical egoism and utilitarianism. She and Singer use an evolutionary debunking argument to damage egoism but leave utilitarianism unscathed. In On What Matters Vol 3. Oxford philosopher Derek Parfit expressed the view that their argument against the rationality of egoism carried "some force" though, as Lazari-Radek and Singer themselves acknowledge, it is not "decisive".

== Utilitarianism ==
In his review of Lazari-Radek and Singer's 2014 book The Point of View of the Universe: Sidgwick and Contemporary Ethics, philosopher Bart Schultz, director of the Civic Knowledge Project at the University of Chicago, describes de Lazari-Radek as “a rising star … of philosophical utilitarianism", stating that their “book might well represent the most significant statement and defense of act utilitarianism since the 19th century, when the classical utilitarianism of Bentham, Mill, and Sidgwick were the spirit of the age." De Lazari-Radek defends a form of act utilitarianism similar to that of Sidgwick whose work was the focus of her doctoral dissertation entitled “Good and Reason in the Moral Philosophy of Henry Sidgwick (2007)."

De Lazari-Radek also draws insights from more contemporary thinkers like Parfit who classified her and Singer's view that we have most reason to do whatever would be impartially best as a form of "Rational Impartialism".

In July 2017 her and Singer's second book was published Utilitarianism: A Very Short Introduction, of which Jeff McMahan, White's Professor of Moral Philosophy, Oxford University, has said: "Written with characteristic clarity by the acknowledged heirs of the founders of utilitarianism, this discussion is authoritative, sympathetic though not uncritical, and remarkably comprehensive - in a word, ideal."

== Hedonism ==
De Lazari-Radek explains her normative position as a hedonistic utilitarian. She persuaded Singer to embrace hedonism instead of preference utilitarianism during their collaboration on The Point of View of the Universe. She is exploring the matter more carefully in her two books on well-being and pleasure: Godny pożądania stan świadomości (in Polish, WUŁ 2021) and Philosophy of Pleasure: An Introduction (in English, Routledge 2024).

== Personal life ==
De Lazari-Radek lives and works in Łódź, Poland. She is married and has two children.

== Publications ==
- Rationing in medicine - recenzja, 2002
- Prorok wśród swoich, 2004
- W poszukiwaniu złotego środka, 2007
- Singer kontratakuje, 2009
- Konsekwencjalizm i tajemnica: obrona ezoterycznej moralności, 2013
- The Point of View of the Universe: Sidgwick and Contemporary Ethics (with Peter Singer), Oxford University Press, 2014
- Utilitarianism: A Very Short Introduction (with Peter Singer), Oxford University Press, 2017
- Godny pożądania stan świadomości Wydawnictwo Uniwersytetu Łódzkiego, 2021

== See also ==
- Utilitarianism
- Act Utilitarianism
- Hedonism
