= Should the Baby Live? =

1985 book by Peter Singer and Helga Kuhse

Should the Baby Live? The Problem of Handicapped Infants
- Cover of the first edition
- Authors: Peter Singer; Helga Kuhse
- Language: English
- Subject: Infanticide
- Publisher: Oxford University Press
- Publication date: 1985
- Publication place: United Kingdom
- Media type: Print (Hardcover)
- Pages: 336
- ISBN: 0-19-217745-1

Should the Baby Live? The Problem of Handicapped Infants is a 1985 book by the philosophers Peter Singer and Helga Kuhse, in which the authors examine moral issues surrounding babies born with disabilities, and argue for infanticide in certain cases.
