= A Darwinian Left =

1999 book by Peter Singer

A Darwinian Left: Politics, Evolution and Cooperation
- Cover of the first edition
- Author: Peter Singer
- Language: English
- Subject: Human nature
- Publisher: Weidenfeld & Nicolson
- Publication date: 1999
- Publication place: United States
- Media type: Print (Hardcover)
- Pages: 70
- ISBN: 0-297-64336-3

A Darwinian Left: Politics, Evolution and Cooperation is a 1999 book by the philosopher Peter Singer. In the book, Singer argues that the view of human nature provided by evolutionary science, particularly by evolutionary psychology, is compatible with the ideological framework of the Left and should be incorporated into it.

== Summary ==
Singer believes that the Left will be better able to achieve its social and economic goals if it incorporates the more accurate view of human nature provided by evolutionary science: "To be blind to the facts about human nature is to risk disaster". For example, Singer argues that the Left's view of human nature as highly malleable, which he identifies with Marxism and the standard social science model, is incorrect.

Singer argues that evolutionary psychology suggests that humans naturally tend to be self-interested. He further argues that the evidence that selfish tendencies are natural must not be taken as evidence that selfishness is right. He concludes that game theory (the mathematical study of strategy) and experiments in psychology offer hope that self-interested people will make short-term sacrifices for the good of others, if society provides the right conditions. Essentially, Singer claims that although humans possess selfish, competitive tendencies naturally, they have a substantial capacity for cooperation that has also been selected for during human evolution.

== Reception ==
The philosopher Philip Kitcher has criticised the book's handling of sociobiology, saying that it contains "credulous retailing of sociobiological speculations" while noting that "much of this book is admirable in its clarity, directness, and grasp of central points".

The philosopher Peter Amato writes that "Singer's characterizations of the Left unfortunately distort and deny its variety and the complexity of the issues Leftists are concerned with", and that his "Darwinist anti-Marxism is based on an ideological oversimplification of both positions".

== See also ==
- The Blank Slate: The Modern Denial of Human Nature
- Mutual Aid: A Factor of Evolution
