= How Are We to Live? =

1993 book by Peter Singer

How Are We to Live?: Ethics in an Age of Self-Interest
- Cover of the first edition
- Author: Peter Singer
- Language: English
- Subject: Applied ethics
- Publisher: Text Publishing, Melbourne
- Publication date: 1993
- Publication place: Australia
- Media type: Print (Paperback)
- Pages: 262
- ISBN: 1863721010

How Are We to Live?: Ethics in an Age of Self-Interest is a 1993 book about applied ethics by moral philosopher Peter Singer. Singer argues that doing the right thing involves attending to the sufferings and preferences of other sentient beings.

== Summary ==
Singer presents a history of ethical thought, and attempts to refute the popular idea that humans are genetically driven to be selfish. He explains how this idea has been attributed to Thomas Hobbes and Adam Smith, and how politicians like Margaret Thatcher and Ronald Reagan tried to persuade people that self-interest was good. Singer takes a contrary view, and argues that self-interest is a time-bomb for society.

Singer discusses Japanese culture and how its ethical perspective differs from that of modern western culture, and attempts to infer a few properties of the development of ethical thought. Singer argues in favour of a form of R. M. Hare's notion of universalizability as a basis for ethics: he argues we should make choices with reference to the whole universe. He proposes that ethical behavior is in fact beneficial for the individual under real-life conditions, and proposes five practical ethical rules based on a computer simulation of the Prisoner's Dilemma. He draws on the Golden Rule, and explains how the broad cross-cultural support for it gives it a central role in ethics. Singer elaborates on the reasons for behaving ethically and how they apply on actual everyday life.

Singer discusses various philosophical perspectives on ethics, including Christian and Kantian ones. The book asserts that "In a society in which the narrow pursuit of material self-interest is the norm, the shift to an ethical stance is more radical than many people realize."

Singer attempts to show how the key for a satisfactory life resides on its purpose and how crucial for that purpose a commitment to an ethical life is. This connects with the argument that the pursuit of self-interest is self-defeating. He argues that altruism can be genuine – not just enlightened self-interest, and offers examples of people who sacrificed their lives to save people from Nazis to make this point. Singer comments on the effect of having the widest perspective possible on our ethical decisions; on how our rational capability sometimes leads us to change our goal; and on the paradoxical opportunity that the existence of so many ills on the world brings to us by way of showing plenty of clearly worthwhile goals. To live a good life, the book prescribes: "You can rethink your goals and question what you are doing with your life. That might mean quitting your job, selling your house, and going to work for a voluntary organization in India. More often, the commitment to a more ethical way of living will be the first step of a gradual but far-reaching evolution in your lifestyle and in your thinking about your place in the world. One thing is certain: you will find plenty of worthwhile things to do."

== Reception ==
The Oxford philosopher Roger Crisp wrote, "Imagine that you could choose a book that everyone in the world would read. My choice would be this book."

Critics have suggested Singer misrepresents the role of self-interest in some religions, such as the prospect of rewards in heaven.

Singer has said, "I am not really satisfied with the book". He has expressed concerns that his argument that an ethical life makes for a fulfilling life "contains an element of wishful thinking", as he does not always do everything that he believes to be morally right and so might have underestimated how demanding morality can be, set against other things that might be fulfilling in life.

== Editions and translations ==
The first edition was published in Melbourne, Australia by Text Publishing Company in 1993. It was reissued in Britain by Mandarin Press in 1994, and in the United States by Prometheus Books in 1995.

A second edition was produced by Oxford University Press in 1997.

The German translation, by Hermann Vetter, was published by Harald Fischer Verlag in 1996 as Wie sollen wir leben?: Ethik in einer egoistischen Zeit. A paperback was produced by Deutscher Taschenbuch Verlag in 1999 and went through several reprints, most recently in 2004.
