= Peter Singer =

Australian moral philosopher (born 1946)

Peter Singer AC FAHA
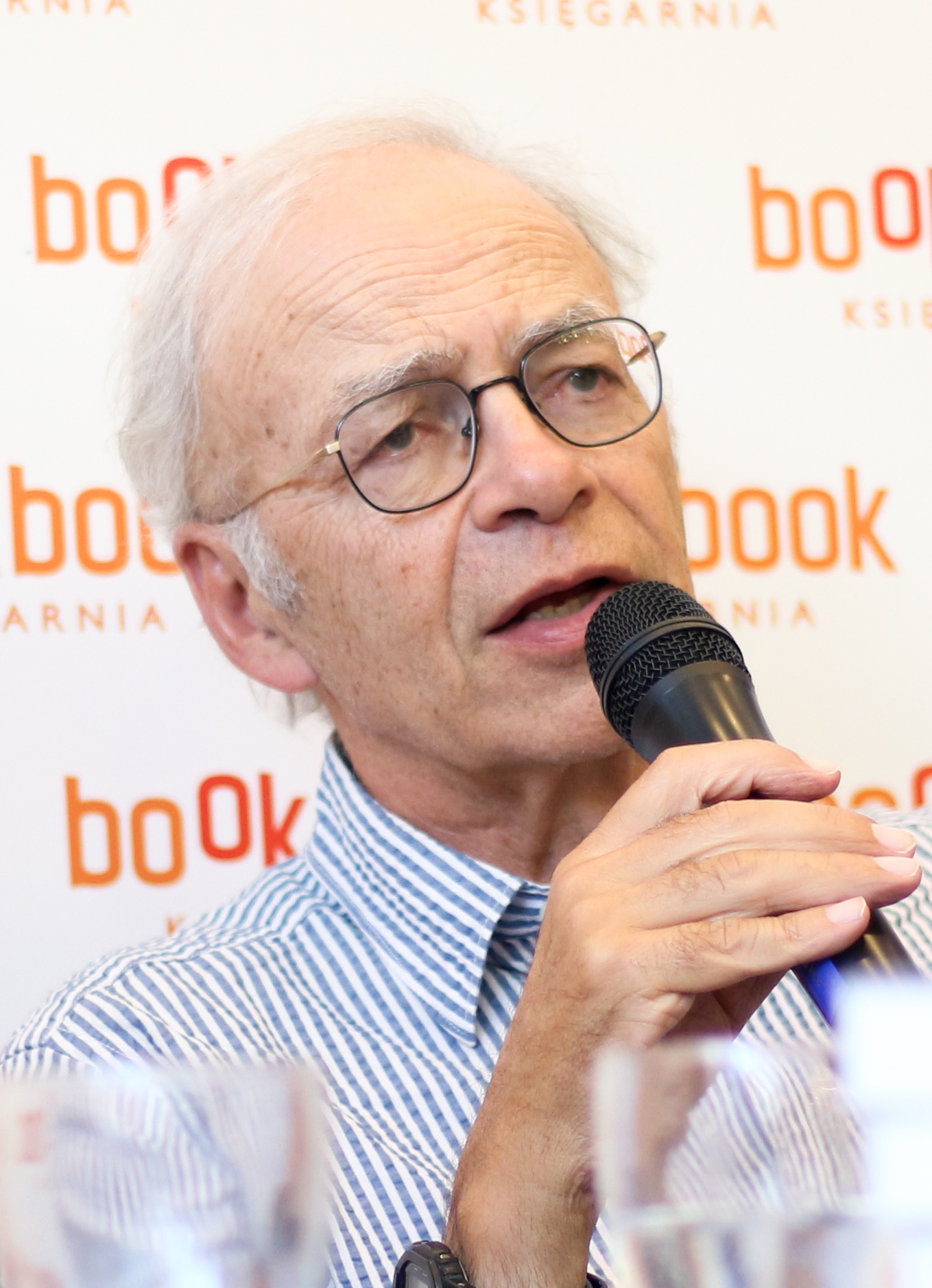
- Singer in 2017
- Born: Peter Albert David Singer; 6 July 1946 (age 80); Melbourne, Victoria, Australia
- Political party: Greens
- Spouse: Renata Diamond (m. 1968)
- Children: 3
- Awards: Berggruen Prize (2021); BBVA Foundation Frontiers of Knowledge Award (2022)

Education
- Education: University of Melbourne (BA, MA); University College, Oxford (BPhil)
- Thesis: Disobedience and Democracy: A Study in Political Obligation (1971)
- Academic advisor: R. M. Hare (BPhil advisor)

Philosophical work
- School: Analytic philosophy; Utilitarianism
- Institutions: University College, Oxford; New York University; La Trobe University; Monash University; Princeton University; University of Melbourne
- Main interests: Applied ethics; Bioethics
- Notable works: Animal Liberation (1975); Practical Ethics (1979); How Are We to Live? (1993); The Life You Can Save (2009)
- Notable ideas: Equal consideration of interests; Speciesism; Drowning child analogy; Effective altruism; Argument from marginal cases; Personism

Peter Albert David Singer (born 6 July 1946) is an Australian moral philosopher who is Emeritus Ira W. DeCamp Professor of Bioethics at Princeton University. Singer's work specialises in applied ethics, approaching the subject from a secular, utilitarian perspective. His book Animal Liberation (1975) criticized intensive animal farming and speciesism, and shaped the animal rights movement. His essay "Famine, Affluence, and Morality" argues for the moral imperative of donating to help the global poor, using the drowning child analogy. For most of his career he was a preference utilitarian. He revealed in The Point of View of the Universe (2014), co-authored with Katarzyna de Lazari-Radek, that he had become a hedonistic utilitarian. His books The Life You Can Save (2009) and The Most Good You Can Do (2015) are influential in the effective altruism movement.

On two occasions, Singer served as chair of the philosophy department at Monash University, where he founded its Centre for Human Bioethics. In 1996, he stood unsuccessfully as a Greens candidate for the Australian Senate. In 2004, Singer was recognised as the Australian Humanist of the Year by the Council of Australian Humanist Societies. In 2005 The Sydney Morning Herald placed him among Australia's ten most influential public intellectuals. Singer is a co-founder of Animals Australia and the founder of the non-profit organisation The Life You Can Save.

== Early life and education ==
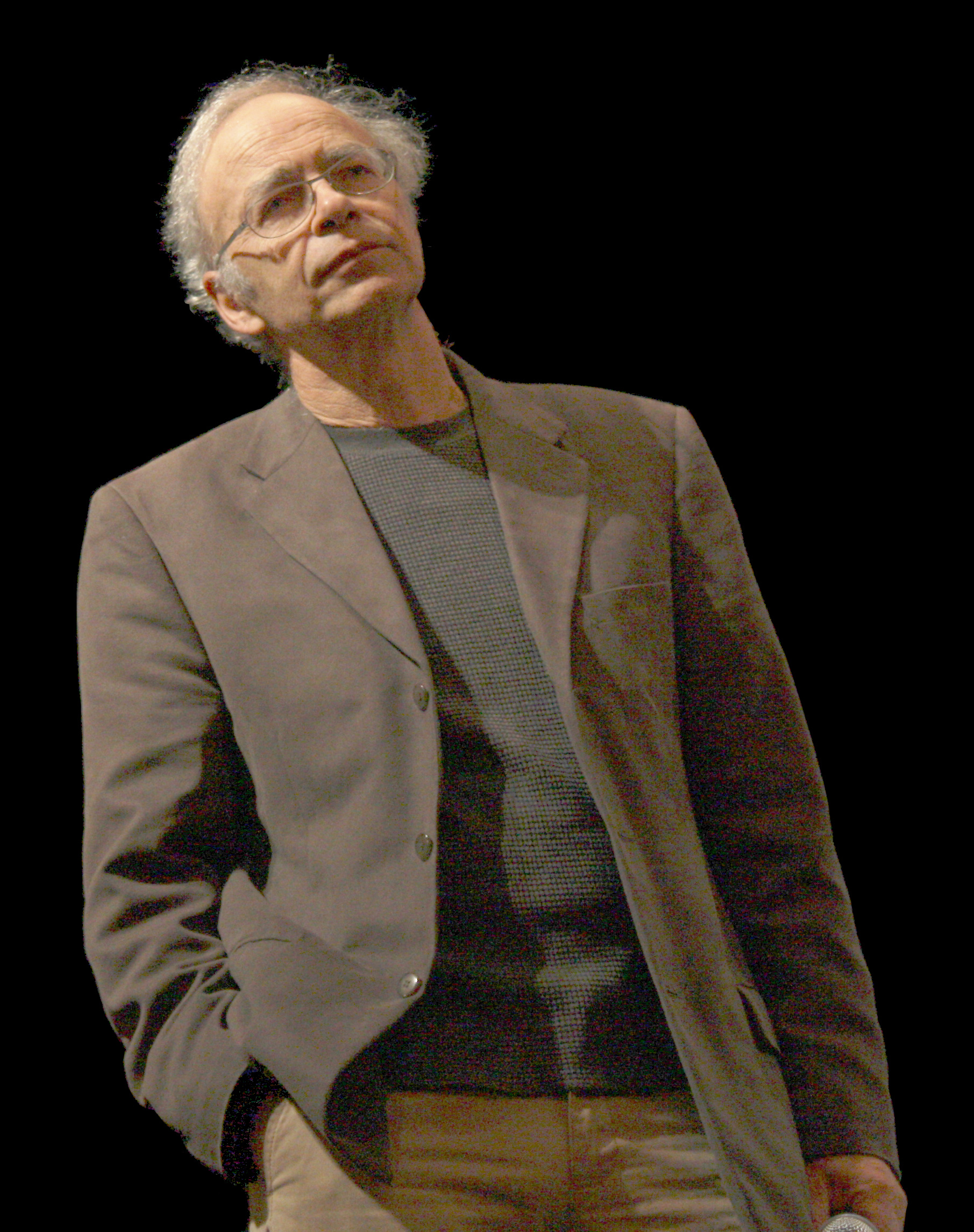
Singer in 2009

Peter Albert David Singer was born in Melbourne, Victoria, Australia, on 6 July 1946. His parents were Austrian Jews who immigrated to Australia from Vienna after Austria's annexation (Anschluss) by Nazi Germany in 1938, and settled in Melbourne. His paternal grandparents were taken by the Nazis to Łódź, and were most likely murdered, since they were never heard from again. His maternal grandfather, the educator and psychologist David Ernst Oppenheim (1881–1943), was murdered in the Theresienstadt concentration camp. Oppenheim was a member of the Vienna Psychoanalytic Society and wrote a joint article with Sigmund Freud, before joining the Adlerian Society for Individual Psychology. Singer later wrote a biography of Oppenheim.

Singer is an atheist and was raised in a prosperous, non-religious family. His father had a successful business importing tea and coffee. His family rarely observed Jewish holidays, and Singer declined to have a bar mitzvah. Singer attended Preshil, and later Scotch College. After leaving school, Singer studied law, history, and philosophy as a resident of Ormond College at the University of Melbourne, earning a bachelor's degree in 1967. Singer explained that he elected to major in philosophy after his interest was piqued by discussions with his sister's then-boyfriend. He earned a master's degree for a thesis entitled Why Should I Be Moral? at the same university in 1969. He was awarded a scholarship to study at the University of Oxford and obtained from there a Bachelor of Philosophy in 1971 with a thesis on civil disobedience supervised by R. M. Hare and published as a book in 1973. Singer names Hare, Australian philosopher H. J. McCloskey and British philosopher J. L. H. Thomas, who taught him "how to read and understand Hegel", as his most important mentors.

In the preface to Hegel: A Very Short Introduction, Singer recalls his time in Thomas' "remarkable" classes at Oxford where students were forced to "probe passages of the Phenomenology sentence by sentence, until they yielded their meaning". One day at Balliol College in Oxford, he had what he refers to as probably the formative experience of his life. He was having a discussion after class with fellow graduate student Richard Keshen, who later became a professor at Cape Breton University. During their lunch Keshen opted to have a salad after being told that the spaghetti sauce contained meat. Singer had the spaghetti. Singer eventually questioned Keshen about his reason for avoiding meat. Keshen explained his ethical objections. Singer later stated, "I'd never met a vegetarian who gave such a straightforward answer that I could understand and relate to." Keshen later introduced Singer to his vegetarian friends. Singer was able to find one book in which he could read up on the issue (Animal Machines by Ruth Harrison) and within a week or two he approached his wife saying that he thought they needed to make a change to their diet and that he did not think they could justify eating meat.

== Academic career ==
After spending three years as a Radcliffe lecturer at University College, Oxford, he was a visiting professor at New York University for 16 months, where he influenced the views of James Rachels and Peter Unger about animals and famine. In 1977, he returned to Melbourne where he spent most of his career, aside from appointments as visiting faculty abroad, until his move to Princeton in 1999.

In June 2011 Singer joined the professoriate of New College of the Humanities, a private college in London, in addition to his work at Princeton. He gave his last lecture at Princeton in 2023, and has retired. He has been a regular contributor to Project Syndicate since 2001.

According to philosopher Helga Kuhse, Singer is almost certainly the best-known and most widely read of all contemporary philosophers. Michael Specter wrote that Singer is among the most influential of contemporary philosophers. He co-founded the open-access Journal of Controversial Ideas along with the bioethicist Francesca Minerva and the moral philosopher Jeff McMahan in 2018.

== Philosophy ==
=== Practical Ethics ===
Singer's Practical Ethics (1979) is a book in applied ethics, where he systematically applies a preference utilitarian framework to a wide range of contemporary moral issues, such as equality, global poverty, euthanasia, ethical vegetarianism, environmental ethics, civil disobedience and violence. He challenges readers to reconsider their moral intuitions and to adopt a more rational and consistent ethical stance, often leading to controversial conclusions.

The book analyzes why and how living beings' interests should be weighed. According to Singer, ethics requires an impartial, "universal" perspective and proposes the principle of equal consideration of interests. This does not mean equal treatment, as different interests (e.g., avoiding pain versus cultivating abilities) warrant different treatment, and factors like diminishing marginal utility can affect how similar interests are treated (e.g., a starving person's interest in food over a slightly hungry person's). The fundamental criterion for a being to have interests warranting equal consideration is sentience, defined as the capacity for suffering or happiness. Sentient beings also have interests in developing their abilities, in satisfying basic needs for food and shelter, in enjoying warm personal relationships, in being free to pursue one's projects without interference, "and many others". The conclusion is that one must adopt the course of action that likely maximises the interests of those affected.

Singer's universalising step applies to interests regardless of who has them, whereas the Kantian's applies to the judgments of rational agents (for example in Kant's kingdom of Ends or John Rawls's original position). This universalising step, which Singer traces from Immanuel Kant to Hare,is crucial and sets him apart from those moral theorists, from Thomas Hobbes to David Gauthier, who tie morality to prudence. According to Singer, universalisation leads directly to utilitarianism, on the strength of the thought that one's own interests cannot count for more than the interests of others. Singer regards Kantian universalisation as unjust to animals. As for the Hobbesians, Singer attempts a response in the final chapter of Practical Ethics, arguing that self-interested reasons support adoption of the moral point of view, such as "the paradox of hedonism", which counsels that happiness is best found by not looking for it, and the need most people feel to relate to something larger than their own concerns. Singer identifies as a sentientist; sentientism is an ethical position that grants moral consideration to all sentient beings.

=== Effective altruism and world poverty ===
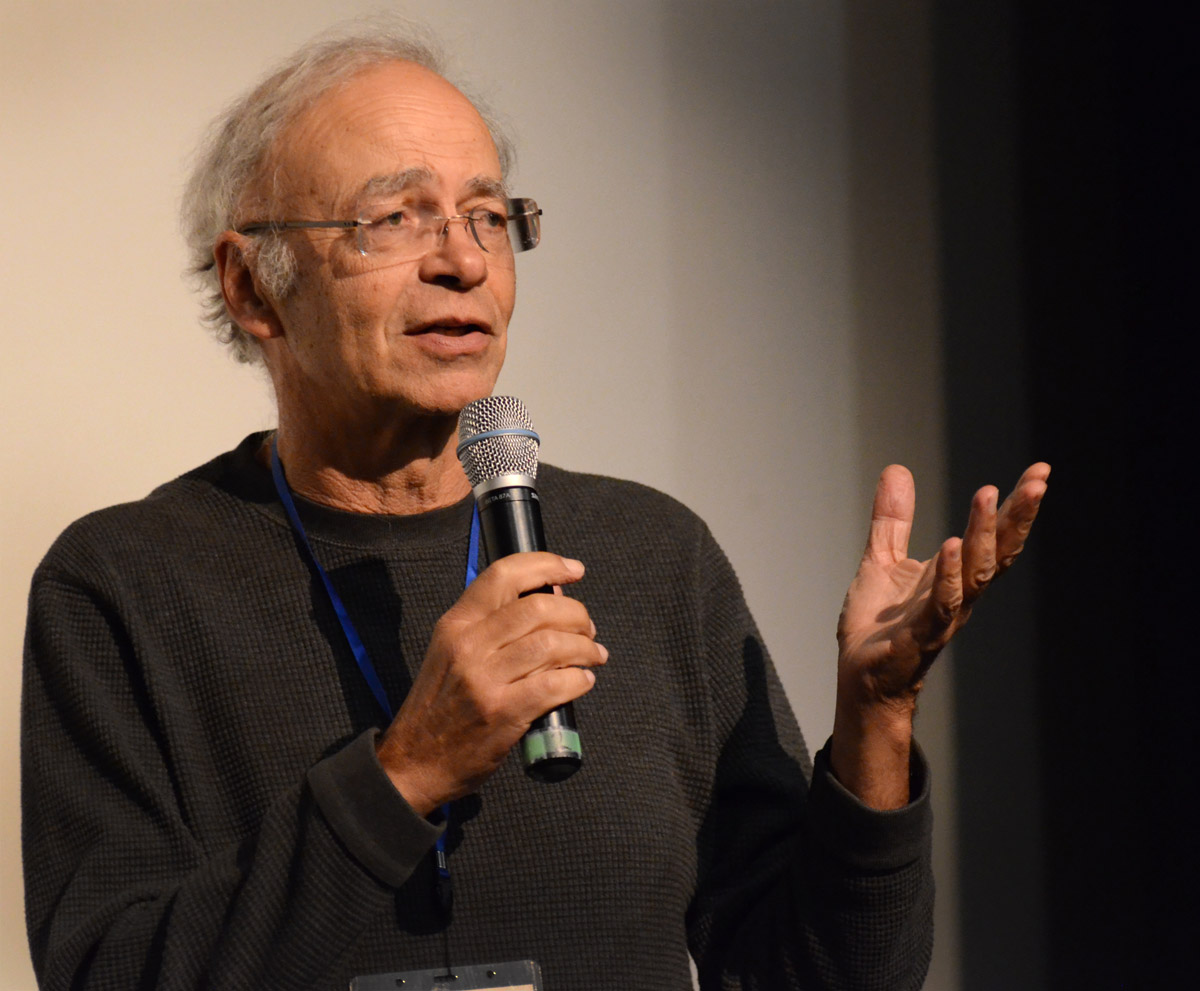
Singer at an effective altruism conference in Melbourne in 2015

Singer has influenced effective altruism. In his essay "Famine, Affluence, and Morality" (1972), he posits that citizens of rich nations have a moral imperative to give at least some of their disposable income to charities that help the global poor. He uses the drowning child analogy, which states that most people would rescue a drowning child from a pond, even if it meant that their expensive clothes were ruined. He argues that we can save lives by donating to effective charities, and that a significant portion of the money spent on unnecessary possessions should instead be donated to charities helping the world's poor. He argues that people should try not only to reduce suffering but to reduce it in the most effective manner possible.

He writes about how the effective altruism movement is doing these things effectively in The Most Good You Can Do (2015). He is a board member of Animal Charity Evaluators, a charity evaluator used by many members of the effective altruism community which recommends the most cost-effective animal advocacy charities and interventions.

His own organisation, The Life You Can Save (TLYCS), recommends a selection of charities deemed by charity evaluators such as GiveWell to be the most effective when it comes to helping those in extreme poverty. TLYCS was founded after Singer released his eponymous 2009 book, in which he argues more generally in favour of giving to charities that help to end global poverty. Since November 2009, Singer is a member of Giving What We Can, an international organisation whose members pledge to give at least 10% of their income to effective charities. He gave a TED talk, "The Why and How of Effective Altruism".

=== Animal liberation and speciesism ===
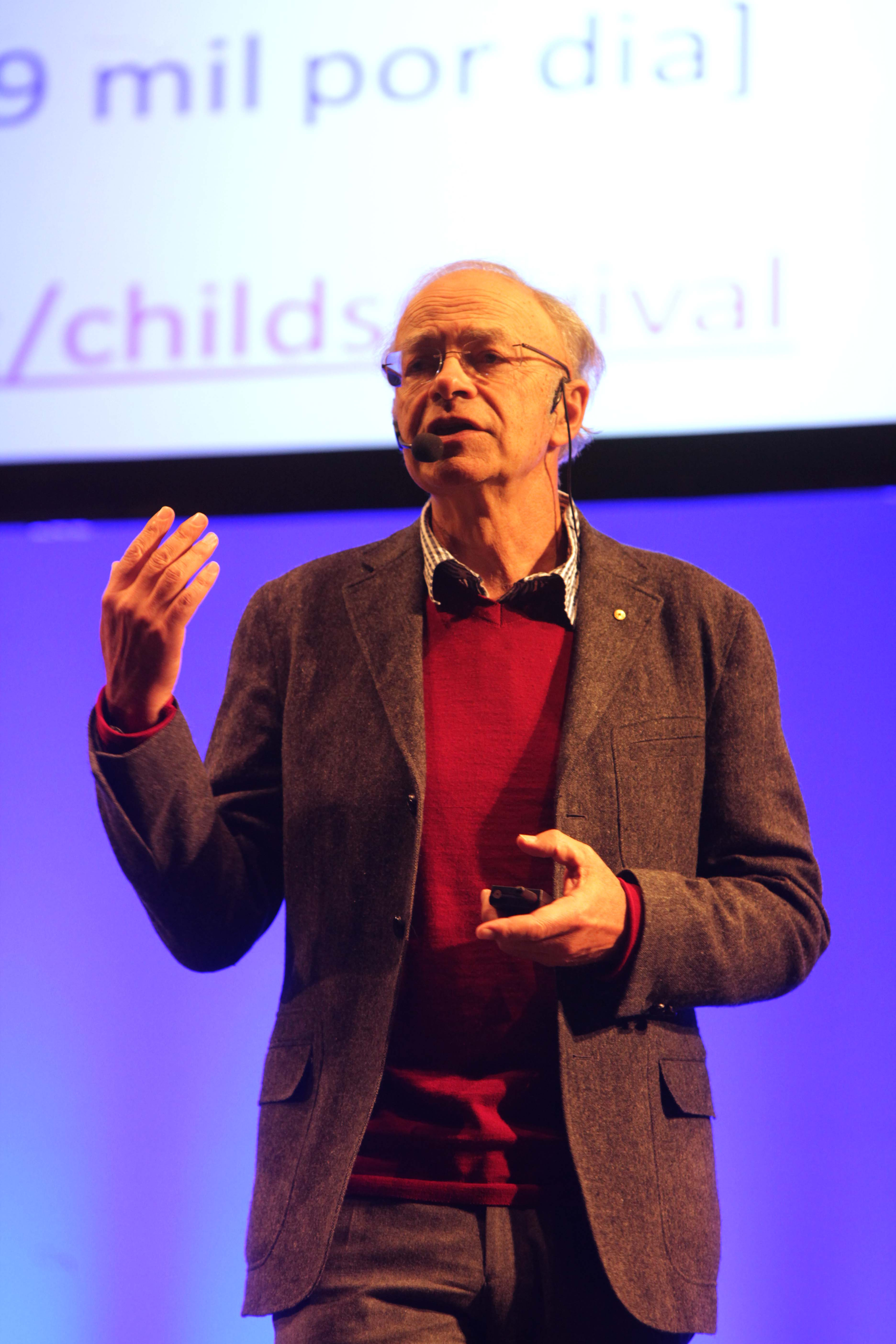
Singer in São Paulo in 2013

Animal Liberation (1975) has been cited as a formative influence on leaders of the modern animal rights movement. The book's central argument is an expansion of the utilitarian concept that "the greatest good of the greatest number" is the only measure of good or ethical behaviour, and Singer believes that there is no reason not to apply this principle to other animals, arguing that the boundary between human and "animal" is completely arbitrary. For example, there are far more differences between a great ape and an oyster than between a human and a great ape, and yet the former two are lumped together as "animals", whereas we are considered "human" in a way that supposedly differentiates us from all other "animals". He popularised the term "speciesism", which had been coined by English writer Richard D. Ryder to describe the practice of privileging humans over other animals, and argues in favour of the equal consideration of interests of all sentient beings.

In Animal Liberation, Singer argues in favour of vegetarianism and against most animal experimentation. He stated in a 2006 interview that he does not eat meat and that he has been a vegetarian since 1971. He also said that he has "gradually become increasingly vegan" and that "I am largely vegan but I'm a flexible vegan. I don't go to the supermarket and buy non-vegan stuff for myself. But when I'm traveling or going to other people's places I will be quite happy to eat vegetarian rather than vegan." In 2022, Singer stated that he is not fully vegan because he occasionally consumes oysters, mussels, and clams due to their lack of a central nervous system. According to Singer, meat-eating can be ethically permissible if "farms really give the animals good lives, and then humanely kill them, preferably without transporting them to slaughterhouses or disturbing them. In Animal Liberation, I don't really say that it's the killing that makes [meat-eating] wrong, it's the suffering."

In an article for the online publication Chinadialogue, Singer called Western-style meat production cruel, unhealthy, and damaging to the ecosystem. He rejected the idea that the method was necessary to meet the population's increasing demand, explaining that animals in factory farms have to eat food grown explicitly for them, and they burn up most of the food's energy just to breathe and keep their bodies warm. In a 2010 Guardian article he titled, "Fish: the forgotten victims on our plate", Singer drew attention to the welfare of fish. He quoted author Alison Mood's startling statistics from a report she wrote, which was released on fishcount.org.uk just a month before the Guardian article. Singer states that she "has put together what may well be the first-ever systematic estimate of the size of the annual global capture of wild fish. It is, she calculates, in the order of one trillion, although it could be as high as 2.7tn."

Some chapters of Animal Liberation are dedicated to criticising animal testing. Unlike groups such as PETA, Singer is willing to accept testing when there is a clear benefit for medicine. In November 2006, Singer appeared on the BBC programme Monkeys, Rats and Me: Animal Testing and said that he felt that Tipu Aziz's experiments on monkeys for research into treating Parkinson's disease could be justified. Whereas Singer has continued since the publication of Animal Liberation to promote vegetarianism and veganism, he has been much less vocal in recent years on the subject of animal experimentation. Singer has defended some of the actions of the Animal Liberation Front such as the stealing of footage from Thomas Gennarelli's laboratory in May 1984 (as shown in the documentary Unnecessary Fuss) but condemned other actions such as the use of explosives by some animal-rights activists, and sees the freeing of captive animals as largely futile when they are easily replaced. Singer features in the 2017 documentary Empathy, directed by Ed Antoja, which aims to promote a more respectful way of life towards all animals. The documentary won the "Public Choice Award" of the Greenpeace Film Festival. Singer has frequently collaborated on op-eds and otherwise with animal rights advocate Karen Dawn.

Roger Scruton was critical of the consequentialist, utilitarian approach of Singer. Scruton alleged that Singer's works, including Animal Liberation (1975), "contain little or no philosophical argument. They derive their radical moral conclusions from a vacuous utilitarianism that counts the pain and pleasure of all living things as equally significant and that ignores just about everything that has been said in our philosophical tradition about the real distinction between persons and animals."

=== Other views ===
==== Meta-ethical views ====
In the past, Singer did not hold that objective moral values exist, on the basis that reason could favour both egoism and equal consideration of interests. Singer himself adopted utilitarianism on the basis that people's preferences can be universalised, leading to a situation where one takes the "point of view of the universe" and "an impartial standpoint". In the second edition of Practical Ethics, he concedes that the question of why we should act morally "cannot be given an answer that will provide everyone with overwhelming reasons for acting morally".

When co-authoring The Point of View of the Universe (2014), Singer shifted to the position that objective moral values do exist, and defends the 19th-century utilitarian philosopher Henry Sidgwick's view that objective morality can be derived from fundamental moral axioms that are knowable by reason. Additionally, he endorses Derek Parfit's view that there are object-given reasons for action. Furthermore, Singer and Katarzyna de Lazari-Radek (the co-author of the book) argue that evolutionary debunking arguments can be used to demonstrate that it is more rational to take the impartial standpoint of "the point of view of the universe", as opposed to egoism—pursuing one's own self-interest—because the existence of egoism is more likely to be the product of evolution by natural selection, rather than because it is correct, whereas taking an impartial standpoint and equally considering the interests of all sentient beings is in conflict with what we would expect from natural selection, meaning that it is more likely that impartiality in ethics is the correct stance to pursue.

==== Political views ====
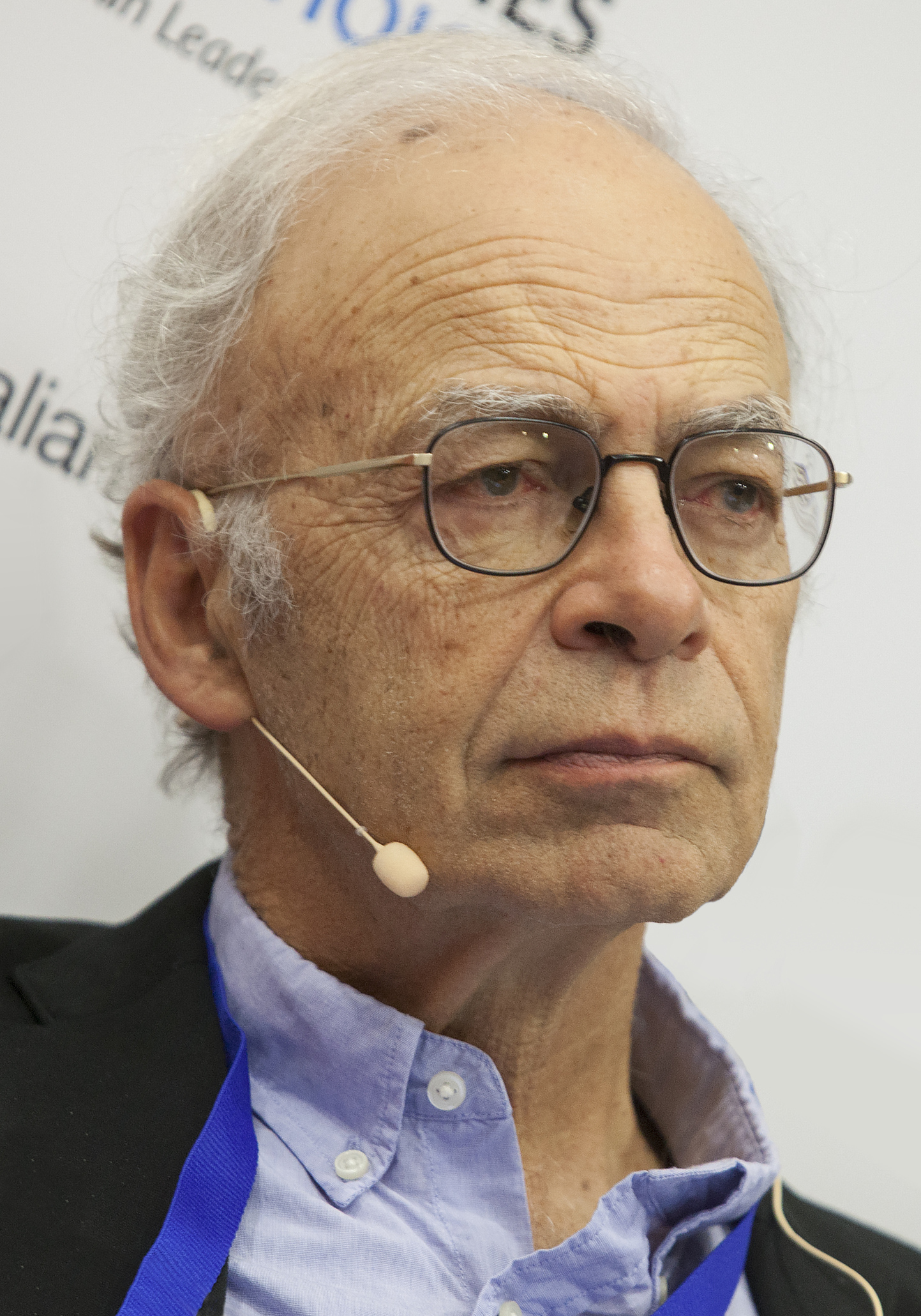
Singer in 2017

Whilst a student in Melbourne, Singer campaigned against the Vietnam War as president of the Melbourne University Campaign Against Conscription. He also spoke publicly for the legalisation of abortion in Australia. Singer joined the Australian Labor Party in 1974 but resigned after disillusionment with the centrist leadership of Bob Hawke; in 1992, he became a founding member of the Victorian Greens. He has run for political office twice for the Greens: he received 28% of the vote in the 1994 Kooyong by-election, and received 3% of the vote in 1996 when running for the Australian Senate (elected by proportional representation). Before the 1996 election, he co-authored a book The Greens with Bob Brown. In A Darwinian Left, Singer outlines a plan for the political left to adapt to the lessons of evolutionary biology. He says that evolutionary psychology suggests that humans naturally tend to be self-interested. He further argues that the evidence that selfish tendencies are natural must not be taken as evidence that selfishness is "right". He concludes that game theory (the mathematical study of strategy) and experiments in psychology offer hope that self-interested people would make short-term sacrifices for the good of others, if society provides the right conditions.

Singer argues that although humans possess selfish, competitive tendencies naturally, they have a substantial capacity for cooperation that also has been selected for during human evolution. Singer's writing in Greater Good magazine, published by the Greater Good Science Center of the University of California, Berkeley, explores scientific studies on why people are compassionate, selfless, and capable of forming peaceful relationships. Singer has criticized the United States for receiving "oil from countries run by dictators ... who pocket most of the" financial gains, thus "keeping the people in poverty". Singer believes that the wealth of these countries "should belong to the people" within them rather than their "de facto government. In paying dictators for their oil, we are in effect buying stolen goods, and helping to keep people in poverty." Singer holds that America "should be doing more to assist people in extreme poverty". He is disappointed in U.S. foreign aid policy, deeming it "a very small proportion of our GDP, less than a quarter of some other affluent nations." Singer maintains that little "private philanthropy from the U.S." is "directed to helping people in extreme poverty, although there are some exceptions, most notably, of course, the Gates Foundation."

Singer describes himself as not anti-capitalist, stating in a 2010 interview with the New Left Project: "Capitalism is very far from a perfect system, but so far we have yet to find anything that clearly does a better job of meeting human needs than a regulated capitalist economy coupled with a welfare and health care system that meets the basic needs of those who do not thrive in the capitalist economy." Singer added that "[i]f we ever do find a better system, I'll be happy to call myself an anti-capitalist." Similarly, in his book Marx, Singer is sympathetic to Karl Marx's criticism of capitalism but is skeptical about whether a better system is likely to be created, writing: "Marx saw that capitalism is a wasteful, irrational system, a system which controls us when we should be controlling it. That insight is still valid; but we can now see that the construction of a free and equal society is a more difficult task than Marx realized."

Singer is opposed to the death penalty, claiming that it does not effectively deter the crimes for which it is the punitive measure, and that he cannot see any other justification for it. In 2010, Singer signed a petition renouncing his right of return to Israel because it is "a form of racist privilege that abets the colonial oppression of the Palestinians." Singer called on Jill Stein to withdraw from the 2016 United States presidential election in states that were close between Hillary Clinton and Donald Trump on the grounds that the stakes were "too high". He argued against the view that there was no significant difference between Clinton and Trump, whilst also saying that he would not advocate such a tactic in Australia's electoral system, which allows for ranking of preferences. When writing in 2017 on Trump's climate change denial and plans to withdraw from the Paris Accords, Singer advocated a boycott of all consumer goods from the United States to pressure the Trump administration to change its environmental policies. In 2021, Singer described the war on drugs as an expensive, ineffective and extremely harmful policy.

Singer argued against the dismissal of Nathan Cofnas, a former research associate at Emmanuel College, Cambridge, who received backlash in 2024 after he stated in a blog post that: "[Black people] would disappear from almost all high-profile positions outside of sports and entertainment" under a system of meritocracy. Singer defended Cofnas' right to assert that black people, on average, have a lower IQ than other racial groups, under freedom of speech. In July 2026, Singer signed a statement against Ghent University dismissing Cofnas. He also then stated in a 2026 article on his Substack Bold Reasoning with Peter Singer, that it may not be the "best course of action" to try to prevent research on this topic, again in relation to Cofnas' remarks.

==== Abortion and euthanasia ====
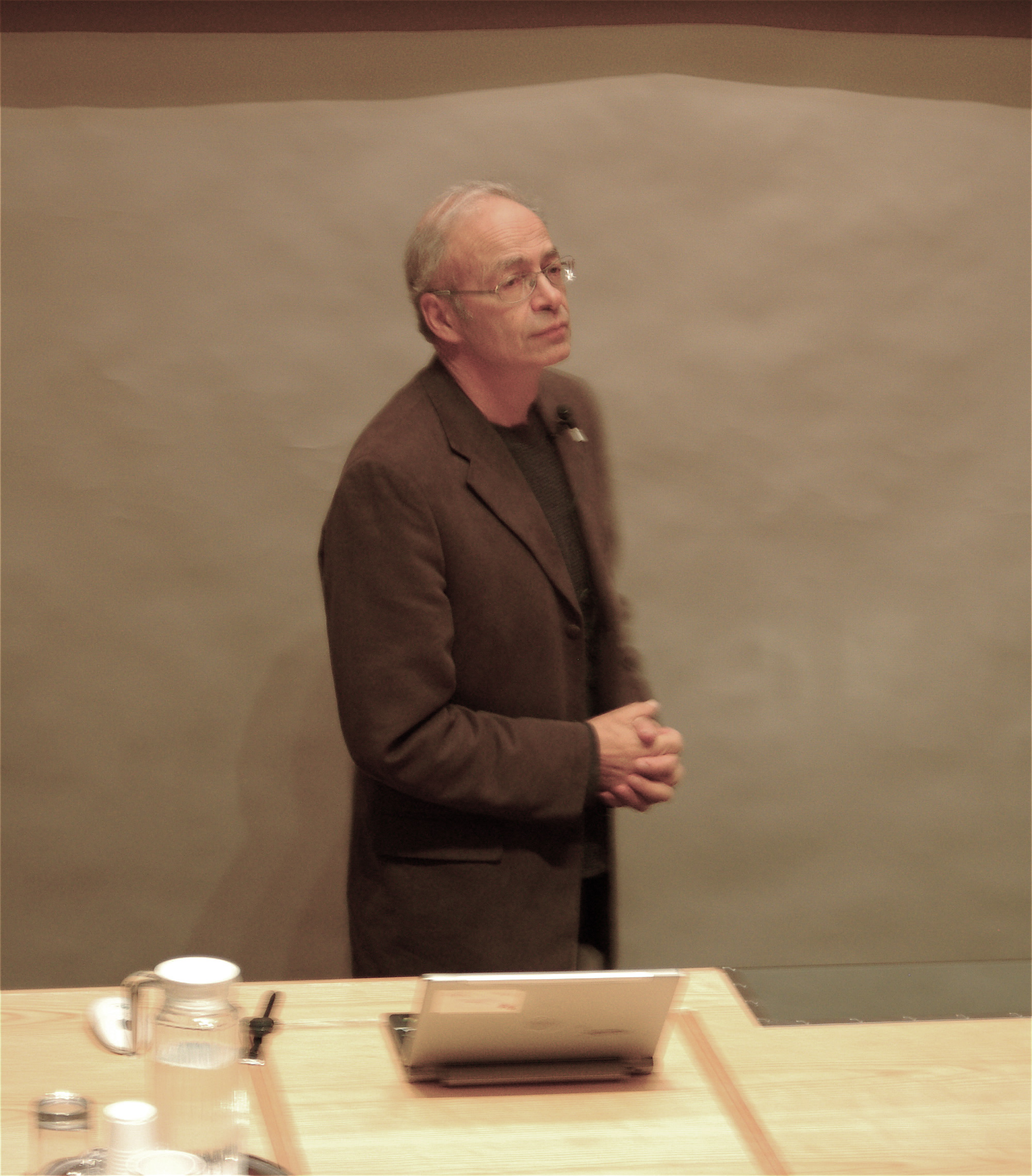
Singer lecturing at Oxford University in 2007

Singer has argued that the right to life is essentially tied to a being's capacity to hold preferences. Similar to his argument for abortion rights, Singer argues that newborns lack the essential characteristics of personhood - "rationality, autonomy, and self-consciousness" - and therefore "killing a newborn baby is never equivalent to killing a person, that is, a being who wants to go on living". Singer has clarified that his "view of when life begins isn't very different from that of opponents of abortion." He deems it not "unreasonable to hold that an individual human life begins at conception. If it doesn't, then it begins about 14 days later, when it is no longer possible for the embryo to divide into twins or other multiples." Singer disagrees with abortion rights opponents in that he does not "think that the fact that an embryo is a living human being is sufficient to show that it is wrong to kill it." Singer wishes "to see American jurisprudence, and the national abortion debate, take up the question of which capacities a human being needs to have in order for it to be wrong to kill it" as well as "when, in the development of the early human being, these capacities are present."

In Rethinking Life and Death, Singer reconstructs the classical syllogism underlying conservative opposition to abortion as: it is wrong to kill an innocent human being; a human fetus is an innocent human being; therefore it is wrong to kill a human fetus. Singer accepts that, given its premises, the argument is deductively valid. He notes that the most common response from supporters of abortion rights is to attack the second premise by denying that the fetus is a human being; Singer rejects this strategy, arguing that human development is a gradual process and that there is no non-arbitrary point at which "human life" can be said to begin.

Instead, Singer's argument for abortion rights challenges the first premise, denying that it is necessarily wrong to end an innocent human life. He describes the claim that a fetus is not alive as a "convenient fiction" and argues that the fact that a being is human and alive does not by itself establish that killing it is wrong. In place of the traditional syllogism, Singer proposes a utilitarian calculation that weighs the preferences of the pregnant woman against any preferences of the fetus. Because the capacity to feel pain or pleasure is, on Singer's view, a precondition for having preferences or interests, and because the fetus lacks this capacity until well into pregnancy, Singer concludes that the fetus has no preferences or interests that can outweigh those of the woman, and that abortion is therefore morally permissible.

Singer classifies euthanasia as voluntary, involuntary, or non-voluntary. Voluntary euthanasia is that to which the subject consents. He argues in favour of voluntary euthanasia and some forms of non-voluntary euthanasia, including infanticide in certain instances, but opposes involuntary euthanasia. Bioethicists associated with the disability rights and disability studies communities have argued that his epistemology is based on ableist conceptions of disability. Singer's positions have also been criticised by some advocates for disability rights and right-to-life supporters, concerned with what they see as his attacks upon human dignity. Religious critics have argued that Singer's ethics ignores and undermines the traditional notion of the sanctity of life. Singer agrees and believes the notion of the sanctity of life ought to be discarded as outdated, unscientific, and irrelevant to understanding problems in contemporary bioethics. Disability rights activists have held many protests against Singer at Princeton University and at his lectures over the years. Singer has replied that many people judge him based on secondhand summaries and short quotations taken out of context, not on his books or articles, and that his aim is to elevate the status of animals, not to lower that of humans.

American publisher Steve Forbes ceased his donations to Princeton University in 1999 because of Singer's appointment to a prestigious professorship. Nazi-hunter Simon Wiesenthal wrote to organisers of a Swedish book fair to which Singer was invited that "[a] professor of morals ... who justifies the right to kill handicapped newborns ... is in my opinion unacceptable for representation at your level." Conservative psychiatrist Theodore Dalrymple wrote in 2010 that Singerian moral universalism is "preposterous—psychologically, theoretically, and practically". In 2002, disability rights activist Harriet McBryde Johnson debated Singer, challenging his belief that it is morally permissible to euthanise newborn children with severe disabilities. "Unspeakable Conversations", Johnson's account of her encounters with Singer and the pro-euthanasia movement, was published in the New York Times Magazine in 2003. In 2015, Singer debated Archbishop Anthony Fisher on the legalisation of euthanasia at Sydney Town Hall. Singer rejected arguments that legalising euthanasia would result in a slippery slope where the practice might become widespread as a means to remove undesirable people for financial or other motives. Singer has experienced the complexities of some of these questions in his own life. His mother had Alzheimer's disease. He said, "I think this has made me see how the issues of someone with these kinds of problems are really very difficult." In an interview with Ronald Bailey, published in December 2000, he explained that his sister shares the responsibility of making decisions about his mother. He said that, if he were solely responsible, his mother might not continue to live.

In 2017, Singer wrote with Jeff McMahan an op-ed in which he defends Anna Stubblefield, who was convicted of aggravated sexual assault against D.J., a man with severe physical disability. Singer and McMahan argued that the judge refused to consider independent evidence that D.J. was indirectly able to communicate, and could have been interrogated. They argued that Anna Stubblefield believed her love to be reciprocal, and that D.J. had still not given sign of hostility towards Stubblefield. Nathan J. Robinson, founder of Current Affairs, criticised when Singer and McMahan wrote that even supposing that D.J. is not just physically but also cognitively impaired (which they contest), then D.J. may not even understand the concept of consent, and it "seems reasonable to assume that the experience was pleasurable to him", as "he was capable of struggling to resist." Robinson called this a "rape", and considers that Singer and McMahan's argument implies that it would be permissible to rape or sexually assault sufficiently disabled people as long as they do not try to resist.

==== Overpopulation ====
Singer has argued that global overpopulation is connected to world poverty, climate change, and loss of biodiversity, and that the topic has become a taboo that should be openly discussed. In 2018 he delivered a lecture on the subject under the title Too Many People? Ethics and Population in the 21st Century, in which he noted that none of the United Nations Sustainable Development Goals or their 169 targets refer to global human population, and concludes that "it is time to have a serious discussion of the issue". Singer further argued that population pressure contributes to the clearing of land and to losses of biodiversity, particularly in regions with rapid population growth, and that limiting population growth would benefit poorer and overpopulated regions and ease efforts to address climate change.

==== Surrogacy ====
In 1985, Singer wrote a book with the physician Deanne Wells arguing that surrogate motherhood should be allowed and regulated by the state by establishing nonprofit 'State Surrogacy Boards', which would ensure fairness between surrogate mothers and surrogacy-seeking parents. Singer and Wells endorsed both the payment of medical expenses endured by surrogate mothers and an extra "fair fee" to compensate the surrogate mother.

==== Religion ====
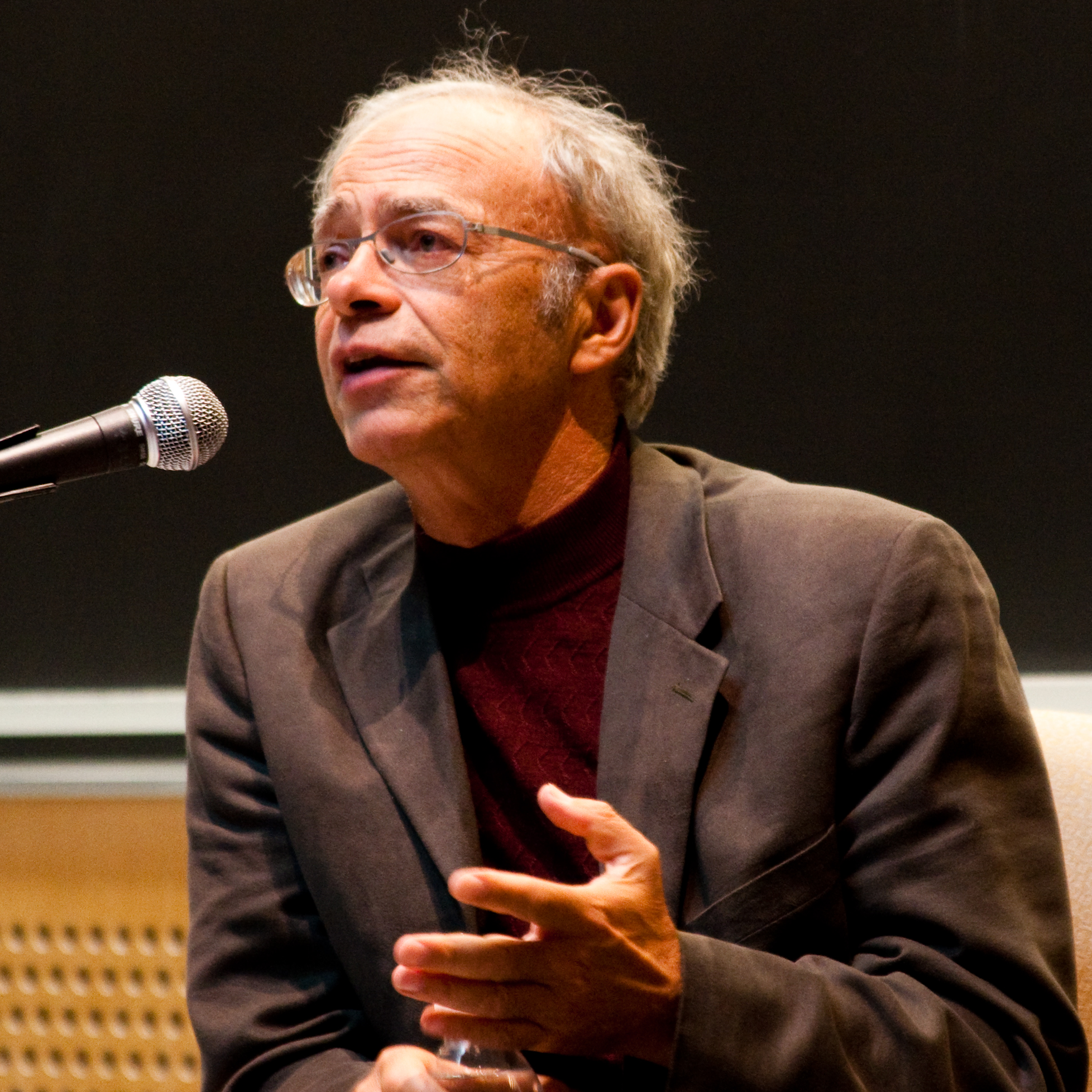
Singer at a Veritas Forum event at MIT in 2009

Singer was a speaker at the 2012 Global Atheist Convention. He has debated with Christians including John Lennox and Dinesh D'Souza. Singer has pointed to the problem of evil as an objection against the Christian conception of God. He stated: "The evidence of our own eyes makes it more plausible to believe that the world was not created by any god at all. If, however, we insist on believing in divine creation, we are forced to admit that the god who made the world cannot be all-powerful and all good. He must be either evil or a bungler." In keeping with his considerations of nonhuman animals, Singer also takes issue with the original sin reply to the problem of evil, saying that, "animals also suffer from floods, fires, and droughts, and, since they are not descended from Adam and Eve, they cannot have inherited original sin."

==== Medical intervention in the aging process ====
Singer supports the view that medical intervention into the ageing process would do more to improve human life than research on therapies for specific chronic diseases in the developed world. He stated:

In developed countries, aging is the ultimate cause of 90 per cent of all human deaths. Thus, treating aging is a form of preventive medicine for all of the diseases of old age. Moreover, even before aging leads to our death, it reduces our capacity to enjoy our lives and to contribute positively to the lives of others. So, instead of targeting specific diseases that are much more likely to occur when people have reached a certain age, wouldn't a better strategy be to try to forestall or repair the damage done to our bodies by the aging process?

Singer worries that "If we discover how to slow aging, we might have a world in which the poor majority must face death at a time when members of the rich minority are only a 10th of the way through their expected lifespans", thus risking that "overcoming aging will increase the stock of injustice in the world". Singer cautiously highlights that as with other medical developments, they would reach the more economically disadvantaged over time once developed, whereas they can never do so if they are not. As to the concern that longer lives might contribute to overpopulation, Singer notes that "success in overcoming aging could itself ... delay or eliminate menopause, enabling women to have their first children much later than they can now" and thus slowing the birth rate, and also that technology may reduce the consequences of rising human populations by (for instance) enabling more zero-greenhouse gas energy sources.

In 2012, Singer's department sponsored the "Science and Ethics of Eliminating Aging" seminar at Princeton.

=== Protests ===
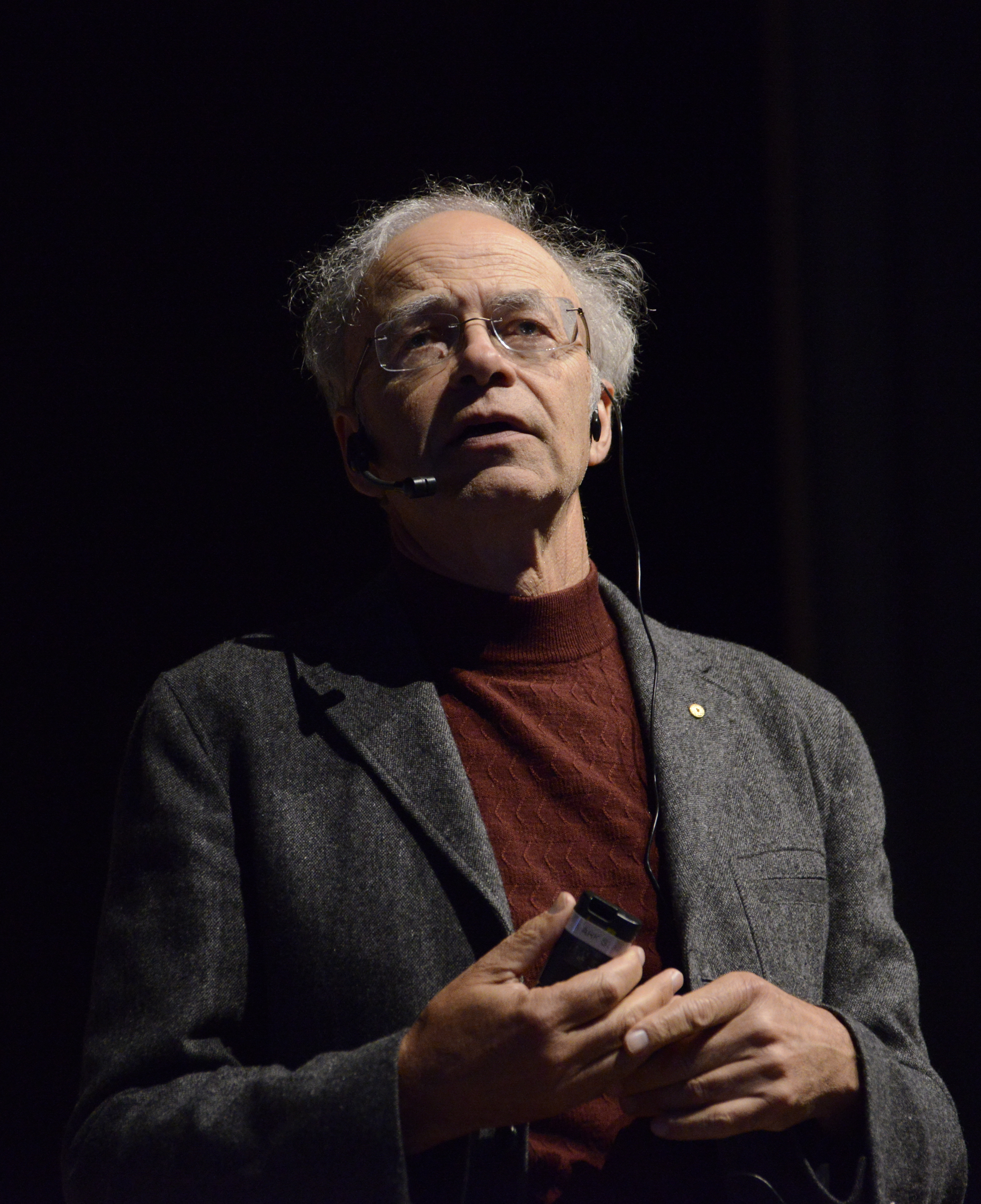
Singer lecturing in Porto Alegre, Brazil, in 2012

In 1989 and 1990, Singer's work was the subject of a number of protests in Germany. A course in ethics led by Hartmut Kliemt at the University of Duisburg where the main text used was Singer's Practical Ethics was, according to Singer, "subjected to organised and repeated disruption by protesters objecting to the use of the book on the grounds that in one of its ten chapters it advocates active euthanasia for severely disabled newborn infants". The protests led to the course being shut down.

When Singer tried to speak during a lecture at Saarbrücken, he was interrupted by a group of protesters including advocates for disability rights. One of the protesters expressed that entering serious discussions would be a tactical error. The same year, Singer was invited to speak in Marburg at a European symposium on "Bioengineering, Ethics and Mental Disability". The invitation was fiercely attacked by leading intellectuals and organisations in the German media, with an article in Der Spiegel comparing Singer's positions to Nazism. Eventually, the symposium was cancelled and Singer's invitation withdrawn.

A lecture at the Zoological Institute of the University of Zurich was interrupted by two groups of protesters. The first group was a group of disabled people who staged a brief protest at the beginning of the lecture. They objected to inviting an advocate of euthanasia to speak. At the end of this protest, when Singer tried to address their concerns, a second group of protesters rose and began chanting Singer raus! Singer raus! ("Singer out!" in German) When Singer attempted to respond, a protester jumped on stage and grabbed his glasses, and the host ended the lecture. Singer explains "my views are not threatening to anyone, even minimally", and says that some groups play on the anxieties of those who hear only keywords that are understandably worrying (given the constant fears of ever repeating the Holocaust) if taken with any less than the full context of his belief system.

In 1991, Singer was due to speak along with R. M. Hare and Georg Meggle at the 15th International Wittgenstein Symposium in Kirchberg am Wechsel, Austria. Singer has stated that threats were made to Adolf Hübner, then the president of the Austrian Ludwig Wittgenstein Society, that the conference would be disrupted if Singer and Meggle were given a platform. Hübner proposed to the board of the society that Singer's invitation, as well as the invitations of a number of other speakers, be withdrawn. The Society decided to cancel the symposium.

In an article originally published in The New York Review of Books, Singer argued that the protests dramatically increased the amount of coverage he received, saying that "instead of a few hundred people hearing views at lectures in Marburg and Dortmund, several millions read about them or listened to them on television". Despite this, Singer argues that it has led to a difficult intellectual climate, with professors in Germany unable to teach courses on applied ethics and campaigns demanding the resignation of professors who invited Singer to speak.

== Recognition ==
Singer was elected a corresponding fellow of the Australian Academy of the Humanities in 1981. He was inducted into the United States Animal Rights Hall of Fame in 2000. In June 2012, Singer was appointed a Companion of the Order of Australia (AC) for "eminent service to philosophy and bioethics as a leader of public debate and communicator of ideas in the areas of global poverty, animal welfare and the human condition". Singer received Philosophy Now's 2016 Award for Contributions in the Fight Against Stupidity for his efforts "to disturb the comfortable complacency with which many of us habitually ignore the desperate needs of others ... particularly for this work as it relates to the Effective Altruism movement".

In 2018, Singer was cited in the book Rescuing Ladybugs by author and animal advocate Jennifer Skiff as a "hero among heroes in the world" who, in arguing against speciesism "gave the modern world permission to believe what we innately know – that animals are sentient and that we have a moral obligation not to exploit or mistreat them." The book states that Singer's "moral philosophy on animal equality was sparked when he asked a fellow student at Oxford University a simple question about his eating habits."

In 2021, Singer was awarded the US$1-million Berggruen Prize, and decided to give it away. He decided in particular to give half of the prize money to his foundation The Life You Can Save, because "over the last three years, each dollar spent by it generated an average of $17 in donations for its recommended nonprofits". He added he has never taken money for personal use from the organisation. Moreover, he plans to donate more than a third of the money to organisations combating intensive animal farming, and recommended as effective by Animal Charity Evaluators.

For 2022, Singer received the BBVA Foundation Frontiers of Knowledge Award in the category of "Humanities and Social Sciences".

Singer serves on the Executive Advisory Board of the World.Minds Foundation, contributing to global ethical discussions on science, society, and responsibility.

== Personal life ==
Since 1968, Singer has been married to Renata Singer (née Diamond; born in 1947 in Wałbrzych, Poland). They have three children: Ruth, a textile artist; Marion, a lawyer and youth arts specialist; and Esther, a linguist and teacher. Singer's wife is a novelist and author, and has collaborated on publications with her husband. Until 2021, she was president of the Kadimah Jewish Cultural Centre and National Library in Melbourne.

== Publications ==
=== Singly authored books ===
- Democracy and Disobedience, Clarendon Press, Oxford, 1973; Oxford University Press, New York, 1974; Gregg Revivals, Aldershot, Hampshire, 1994
- Animal Liberation: A New Ethics for our Treatment of Animals, New York Review/Random House, New York, 1975; Cape, London, 1976; Avon, New York, 1977; Paladin, London, 1977; Thorsons, London, 1983. Harper Perennial Modern Classics, New York, 2002. Harper Perennial Modern Classics, New York, 2009. Fully revised edition: Harper, New York, 2023; Bodley Head, London, 2023; Harper Perennial, New York, 2023; Vintage, London, 2024
- Practical Ethics, Cambridge University Press, Cambridge, 1980; second edition, 1993; third edition, 2011. ISBN 0-521-22920-0, ISBN 0-521-29720-6, ISBN 978-0-521-70768-8
- Marx, Oxford University Press, Oxford, 1980; Hill & Wang, New York, 1980; reissued as Marx: A Very Short Introduction, Oxford University Press, 2000; second edition published 2018; also included in full in K. Thomas (ed.), Great Political Thinkers: Machiavelli, Hobbes, Mill and Marx, Oxford University Press, Oxford, 1992
- The Expanding Circle: Ethics and Sociobiology, Farrar, Straus and Giroux, New York, 1981; Oxford University Press, Oxford, 1981; New American Library, New York, 1982. ISBN 0-19-283038-4
- Hegel, Oxford University Press, Oxford and New York, 1982; reissued as Hegel: A Very Short Introduction, Oxford University Press, 2001; also included in full in German Philosophers: Kant, Hegel, Schopenhauer, Nietzsche, Oxford University Press, Oxford, 1997
- How Are We to Live? Ethics in an Age of Self-interest, Text Publishing, Melbourne, 1993; Mandarin, London, 1995; Prometheus, Buffalo, NY, 1995; Oxford University Press, Oxford, 1997
- Rethinking Life and Death: The Collapse of Our Traditional Ethics, Text Publishing, Melbourne, 1994; St Martin's Press, New York, 1995; reprint 2008. ISBN 0-312-11880-5 Oxford University Press, Oxford, 1995
- Ethics into Action: Henry Spira and the Animal Rights Movement, Rowman and Littlefield, Lanham, Maryland, 1998; Melbourne University Press, Melbourne, 1999
- A Darwinian Left, Weidenfeld and Nicolson, London, 1999; Yale University Press, New Haven, 2000. ISBN 0-300-08323-8
- One World: The Ethics of Globalisation, Yale University Press, New Haven, 2002; Text Publishing, Melbourne, 2002; 2nd edition, pb, Yale University Press, 2004; Oxford Longman, Hyderabad, 2004. ISBN 0-300-09686-0
- Pushing Time Away: My Grandfather and the Tragedy of Jewish Vienna, Ecco Press, New York, 2003; HarperCollins Australia, Melbourne, 2003; Granta, London, 2004
- The President of Good and Evil: The Ethics of George W. Bush, Dutton, New York, 2004; Granta, London, 2004; Text, Melbourne, 2004. ISBN 0-525-94813-9
- The Life You Can Save: Acting Now to End World Poverty. New York: Random House 2009.
- The Most Good You Can Do: How Effective Altruism Is Changing Ideas About Living Ethically. Yale University Press, 2015.
- Ethics in the Real World: 82 Brief Essays on Things That Matter. Princeton University Press, 2016.
- Why Vegan? Eating Ethically. Liveright, 2020.
- Consider the Turkey. Princeton University Press, 2024.

=== Co-authored books ===
- Animal Factories (co-author with James Mason), Crown, New York, 1980
- The Reproduction Revolution: New Ways of Making Babies (co-author with Deane Wells), Oxford University Press, Oxford, 1984. revised American edition, Making Babies, Scribner's New York, 1986
- Animal Liberation: A Graphic Guide (co-author with Lori Gruen), Camden Press, London, 1987
- Should the Baby Live? The Problem of Handicapped Infants (co-author with Helga Kuhse), Oxford University Press, Oxford, 1985; Oxford University Press, New York, 1986; Gregg Revivals, Aldershot, Hampshire, 1994. ISBN 0-19-217745-1
- Ethical and Legal Issues in Guardianship Options for Intellectually Disadvantaged People (co-author with Terry Carney), Human Rights Commission Monograph Series, no. 2, Australian Government Publishing Service, Canberra, 1986
- How Ethical Is Australia? An Examination of Australia's Record as a Global Citizen (with Tom Gregg), Black Inc, Melbourne, 2004
- The Ethics of What We Eat: Why Our Food Choices Matter (or The Way We Eat: Why Our Food Choices Matter), Rodale, New York, 2006 (co-author with Jim Mason); Text, Melbourne; Random House, London. Audio version: Playaway. ISBN 1-57954-889-X
- Eating (co-authored with Jim Mason), Arrow, London, 2006
- Stem Cell Research: the ethical issues. (co-edited by Lori Gruen, Laura Grabel, and Peter Singer). New York: Blackwells. 2007.
- The Future of Animal Farming: Renewing the Ancient Contract (with Marian Stamp Dawkins, and Roland Bonney) 2008. New York: Wiley-Blackwell.
- The Point of View of the Universe: Sidgwick and Contemporary Ethics (with Katarzyna de Lazari-Radek), Oxford University Press, 2014
- Utilitarianism: A Very Short Introduction (with Katarzyna de Lazari-Radek), Oxford University Press, 2017
- The Buddhist and the Ethicist: Conversations on Effective Altruism, Engaged Buddhism, and How to Build a Better World (with Shih Chao-Hwei), Shambhala Publications, 2023
- Shrimp and Prawn Welfare in the Wild-Caught Fishing Industry (Ren Ryba, Shannon M Davis, Tse Yip Fai, Peter Singer). CRC Press, 2026

=== Edited and coedited volumes and anthologies ===
- Test-Tube Babies: a Guide to Moral Questions, Present Techniques, and Future Possibilities (co-edited with William Walters), Oxford University Press, Melbourne, 1982
- Animal Rights and Human Obligations: An Anthology (co-editor with Tom Regan), Prentice-Hall, New Jersey, 1976. 2nd revised edition, Prentice-Hall, New Jersey, 1989
- In Defence of Animals (ed.), Blackwells, Oxford, 1985; Harper & Row, New York, 1986. ISBN 0-631-13897-8
- Applied Ethics (ed.), Oxford University Press, Oxford, 1986
- Embryo Experimentation (co-editor with Helga Kuhse, Stephen Buckle, Karen Dawson and Pascal Kasimba), Cambridge University Press, Cambridge, 1990; paperback edition, updated, 1993
- A Companion to Ethics (ed.), Basil Blackwell, Oxford, 1991; paperback edition, 1993
- Save the Animals! (Australian edition, co-author with Barbara Dover and Ingrid Newkirk), Collins Angus & Robertson, North Ryde, NSW, 1991
- The Great Ape Project: Equality Beyond Humanity (co-editor with Paola Cavalieri), Fourth Estate, London, 1993; hardback, St Martin's Press, New York, 1994; paperback, St Martin's Press, New York, 1995
- Ethics (ed.), Oxford University Press, Oxford, 1994
- Individuals, Humans and Persons: Questions of Life and Death (co-author with Helga Kuhse), Academia Verlag, Sankt Augustin, Germany, 1994
- The Greens (co-author with Bob Brown), Text Publishing, Melbourne, 1996
- The Allocation of Health Care Resources: An Ethical Evaluation of the "QALY" Approach (co-author with John McKie, Jeff Richardson and Helga Kuhse), Ashgate/Dartmouth, Aldershot, 1998
- A Companion to Bioethics (co-editor with Helga Kuhse), Blackwell, Oxford, 1998
- Bioethics. An Anthology (co-editor with Helga Kuhse), Blackwell, 1999/ Oxford, 2006
- The Moral of the Story: An Anthology of Ethics Through Literature (co-edited with Renata Singer), Blackwell, Oxford, 2005
- In Defense of Animals. The Second Wave (ed.), Blackwell, Oxford, 2005
- The Bioethics Reader: Editors' Choice. (co-editor with Ruth Chadwick, Helga Kuhse, Willem Landman and Udo Schüklenk). New York: Blackwell, 2007
- J. M. Coetzee and Ethics: Philosophical Perspectives on Literature (co-editor with A. Leist), New York: Columbia University Press, 2010
- The Golden Ass, by Apuleius (edited and abridged by Peter Singer, translated by Ellen D. Finkelpearl), New York: Liveright Publishing Corporation; London: W.W. Norton and Company, Ltd., 2021

=== Anthologies of Singer's work ===
- Writings on an Ethical Life, Ecco, New York, 2000; Fourth Estate, London, 2001. ISBN 0-06-019838-9
- Unsanctifying Human Life: Essays on Ethics (edited by Helga Kuhse), Blackwell, Oxford, 2001

=== Commentary volumes on Singer's work ===
- Camosy, Charles (2012). Peter Singer and Christian ethics : beyond polarization. Cambridge: Cambridge University Press. ISBN 9786613640734.
- Davidow, Ben (ed.). "Peter Singer" Uncaged: Top Activists Share Their Wisdom on Effective Farm Animal Advocacy. Davidow Press, 2013
- Jamieson, Dale (ed.). Singer and His Critics. Wiley-Blackwell, 1999
- Schaler, Jeffrey A. (ed.). Peter Singer Under Fire: The Moral Iconoclast Faces His Critics. Chicago: Open Court Publishers, 2009

== See also ==
- Demandingness objection
- Intrinsic value (animal ethics)
- J. Howard Moore
- List of animal rights advocates
- Utilitarian bioethics
