= Richard Keshen =

Canadian academic

- Born: 1946 (age 79–80); Canada
- Occupation: University Professor

Richard Keshen (born 1946) is a Canadian university professor of humanities.

== Biography ==
Keshen was born in 1946 in Canada. He married Mary Robertson in 1969. He has two children: Aaron and Colin. At 16, Richard Keshen became interested in street photography with the objective of capturing the humanistic and joyous parts of life.

== Education ==
Keshen completed his undergraduate degree at Glendon College, York University. He completed his post-graduation at Balliol College, Oxford University.

In 1998, Keshen became a visiting scholar at Wolfson College, Oxford University.

== Career ==
Keshen is a Professor Emeritus of Humanities at Cape Breton University.

In 1995 he published a book about the psychology of a persons self-esteem, and in 2017 he wrote a second edition where he compares his views on self-esteem to other psychologists.

== Publications ==
- Reasonable Self-Esteem. Montreal: McGill-Queen's University Press, 1996. ISBN 0-7735-1372-8.
- Reasonable Self-Esteem Second Edition. Montreal: McGill-Queen's University Press, 2017. ISBN 978-0-7735-5071-1.
