= Practical Ethics =

1979 book by Peter Singer

- Cover of the 1980 edition
- Author: Peter Singer
- Language: English
- Subject: Ethics
- Publisher: Cambridge University Press
- Publication date: 1979 (first edition); 1993 (second edition); 2011 (third edition)
- Publication place: United States
- Media type: Print (hardcover and paperback)
- Pages: 395 (second edition)
- ISBN: 0-521-43971-X (second edition paperback)

Practical Ethics, a 1979 book by the moral philosopher Peter Singer, is an introduction to applied ethics.

== Summary ==
Singer analyzes, in detail, why and how beings' interests should be weighed. In his view, a being's interests should always be weighed according to that being's concrete properties, and not according to its belonging to some abstract group. Singer studies a number of ethical issues including race, sex, ability, species, abortion, euthanasia, infanticide, embryo experimentation, the moral status of animals, political violence, overseas aid, and whether we have an obligation to assist others. The 1993 second edition adds chapters on refugees, the environment, equality and disability, embryo experimentation, and the treatment of academics in Germany. A third edition published in 2011 omits the chapter on refugees, and contains a new chapter on climate change.

== Reception ==
Practical Ethics is widely read and was described as "an excellent text for an introductory ethics course" by the philosopher John Martin Fischer. The philosopher James Rachels recommended the book "as an introduction centered on such practical issues as abortion, racism, and so forth." The philosopher Mylan Engel called the book "must reading for anyone interested in living an ethical life."

H. L. A. Hart's review of the first edition in The New York Review of Books was mixed. While writing that "The utility of this utilitarian's book to students of its subject can hardly be exaggerated", Hart also criticized Practical Ethics for philosophical inconsistency in its chapter on abortion. He argues that Singer insufficiently explains how preference and classical utilitarianism each view abortion, and does not bring out their differences.
