= Monash University Faculty of Arts =

The purpose of the Monash University Faculty of Arts is 'the pursuit, advancement and application of knowledge in the humanities, social and environmental sciences and creative and performing arts'. It offers degrees from undergraduate to PhD level. Entrance into the undergraduate Bachelor of Arts program is competitive, as it is the most popular Arts degree among university applicants in Victoria.

== History ==
The Faculty of Arts was one of the foundation faculties of Monash University. In 1961, the faculty enrolled about 150 students out of a university total of about 360. Today, student enrolments number approximately 7,500.

Initially, the Faculty consisted only of the Departments of English, History, Philosophy and Modern Languages (Politics was part of the Economics Faculty). During the 1960s and 70s, this expanded to include a range of new disciplines. Some of these, such as sociology and Indonesian, had never previously been taught in Australia. The Faculty's research and teaching became well known due to its depth in studies relating to Asia, which was unusual at the time for an Australian university.

With the university's expansion in the 1990s, the faculty developed a research and teaching presence overseas, in Malaysia, South Africa, and Italy.

== Location ==
The home campus for the Faculty of Arts is Monash University Clayton Campus. However, the Faculty has a teaching and research presence at most of Monash's campuses, including Caulfield, Malaysia, South Africa, and Berwick.

== Notable alumni ==
The Monash Faculty of Arts has produced a number of notable graduates who are currently leaders in their fields, including:

=== Government, politics and law ===
- Bill Shorten - Federal Opposition Leader, Victorian president of the ALP, former national secretary of the AWU,
- Daniel Andrews - Victorian premier, Victorian Labor leader
- Kevin Bell - Justice of the Supreme Court of Victoria, current president of the Victorian Civil and Administrative Tribunal (VCAT)
- Jennifer Coate - Current coroner of Victoria; first president of the Children's Court of Victoria
- Peter Costello - Longest-serving treasurer of Australia
- Paul Grant - President of the Children's Court of Victoria
- Ian Gray - Chief magistrate of the Magistrates' Court of Victoria
- Felicity Hampel - Prominent human rights lawyer, now judge of the County Court of Victoria
- Alistair Harkness - Politician
- Gavin Jennings - Former Victorian minister for environment and climate change
- Simon Molesworth AM QC - Chairman, Australian Council of National Trusts
- Brendan O'Connor - Australian minister for employment participation
- Clare O'Neil - Youngest female mayor in Australian history
- Robert Ray - Australian senator and former defence minister
- Tony Robinson - Minister for consumer affairs
- Michael Rozenes - Chief judge of the County Court of Victoria
- Sharman Stone- Former Australian minister for Workforce Participation
- Don Watson - author, chief speechwriter to Prime Minister Paul Keating
- Beth Wilson - Victorian Health Services Commissioner

=== Media and arts ===
- Cecilia Dart-Thornton - Author
- Lindy Davies - Actor and dean of the Victorian College of Arts
- Laurie Duggan - Poet
- Jon Faine - Melbourne radio presenter
- Max Gillies AM - Actor/satirist
- Andy Griffiths - children's author
- Leslie Howard - Pianist and composer
- Michael Leunig - Cartoonist
- Eva Orner - Academy Award-winning film producer
- John A. Scott - poet
- Jo Stanley - radio personality
- Alan Wearne - Poet

=== Academia ===
- Diane Bell - Anthropologist
- Michael Clyne - Linguist
- Ben Kiernan - Leading researcher in the study of genocide, Yale University
- Stuart Macintyre - Historian

=== Business ===
- Fiona Balfour - Businesswoman, former Qantas and Telstra executive
- Tony D'Aloisio - Chairman, Australian Securities and Investments Commission (ASIC)
- Peter Ivany - Australian media mogul and billionaire
- Naomi Milgrom - Owner and CEO of Sussan Group

== Schools ==
The Faculty has six academic schools in Australia, and two overseas, which are responsible for the creation and dissemination of disciplinary knowledge through individual and group research and through the development of undergraduate and postgraduate teaching programs.

=== Schools in Australia ===
- Geography and Environmental Science
- Media, Film and Journalism
- Languages, Literatures, Cultures and Linguistics
- Philosophical, Historical and International Studies
- Social Sciences
- Sir Zelman Cowen School of Music and Performance

=== Schools in Malaysia ===
- School of Arts and Social Sciences

=== Schools in South Africa ===
- School of Social Science
