= List of Victorian courts and tribunals =

The following is a list of courts and tribunals in Victoria:

- Supreme Court of Victoria
  - Court of Appeal of the Supreme Court of Victoria
  - Commercial Court
  - Common Law Division of the Supreme Court of Victoria
  - Criminal Law Division of the Supreme Court of Victoria
- County Court of Victoria
- Magistrates' Court of Victoria
- Victorian Civil and Administrative Tribunal
- Koori Court
- Children's Court of Victoria
- Coroners Court of Victoria
