= List of acts of the Parliament of Victoria from 2000 =

This is a list of acts of the Parliament of Victoria, Australia for the year 2000.

== 2000 ==
Short title, or popular name	Citation	Royal assent
Long title
Courts and Tribunals Legislation (Amendment) Act 2000	No. 1 of 2000	28 March 2000
An Act to amend the Constitution Act 1975, (Note: Constitution Act 1975 (No. 8750)) the County Court Act 1958, (Note: County Court Act 1958 (No. 6230)) the Magistrates' Court Act 1989 (Note: Magistrates' Court Act 1989 (No. 51 of 1989)) and the Judicial Remuneration Tribunal Act 1995 (Note: Judicial Remuneration Tribunal Act 1995 (No. 22 of 1995)) with respect to the remuneration and related expenses of judges, masters and magistrates, to repeal section 18(1A) and (1B) of the Sentencing Act 1991, (Note: Sentencing Act 1991 (No. 49 of 1991)) to amend the Victorian Civil and Administrative Tribunal Act 1998 (Note: Victorian Civil and Administrative Tribunal Act 1998 (No. 53 of 1998)) and for other purposes.
Domestic Building Contracts (Amendment) Act 2000	No. 2 of 2000	
Hire-Purchase (Amendment) Act 2000	No. 3 of 2000	
Melbourne City Link (Amendment) Act 2000	No. 4 of 2000	
First Home Owner Grant Act 2000 or the First Home Owner Grant and Home Buyer Schemes Act 2000	No. 5 of 2000	11 April 2000
An Act to encourage and assist home ownership, and to offset the effect of the GST on home ownership, by establishing a scheme for the payment of grants to first home owners, and for other purposes.
Corporations (Victoria) (Amendment) Act 2000	No. 7 of 2000	
Education Acts (Amendment) Act 2000	No. 8 of 2000	
Financial Management (Financial Responsibility) Act 2000	No. 9 of 2000	
Flora and Fauna Guarantee (Amendment) Act 2000	No. 10 of 2000	
Prevention of Cruelty to Animals (Amendment) Act 2000	No. 11 of 2000	
Prostitution Control (Planning) Act 2000	No. 12 of 2000	
Renewable Energy Authority Victoria (Amendment) Act 2000	No. 13 of 2000	
Road Safety (Amendment) Act 2000	No. 14 of 2000	
Administration and Probate (Dust Diseases) Act 2000	No. 15 of 2000	
Gambling Legislation (Responsible Gambling) Act 2000	No. 16 of 2000	
Trade Measurement (Amendment) Act 2000	No. 17 of 2000	
Chinese Medicine Registration Act 2000	No. 18 of 2000	
Disability Services (Amendment) Act 2000	No. 19 of 2000	
Electronic Transactions (Victoria) Act 2000	No. 20 of 2000	16 May 2000
An Act to facilitate electronic transactions and for other purposes.
Equal Opportunity (Breastfeeding) Act 2000	No. 21 of 2000	16 May 2000
Federal Courts (Consequential Amendments) Act 2000 (repealed)	No. 22 of 2000	16 May 2000
An Act to make further amendments consequential on the matters dealt with by the Federal Courts (State Jurisdiction) Act 1999 (Note: Federal Courts (State Jurisdiction) Act 1999 (No. 54 of 1999)) or by Commonwealth legislation relating to federal courts and tribunals and for other purposes. (Repealed by Statute Law (Further Revision) Act 2006 (No. 29 of 2006))
Local Government (Governance) Act 2000	No. 23 of 2000	
National Taxation Reform (Further Consequential Provisions) Act 2000	No. 24 of 2000	
Vocational Education and Training (Council Membership) Act 2000	No. 25 of 2000	
Accident Compensation (Common Law and Benefits) Act 2000	No. 26 of 2000	
Health Practitioner Acts (Amendment) Act 2000	No. 27 of 2000	
Planning and Environment (Amendment) Act 2000	No. 28 of 2000	
Superannuation Acts (Amendment) Act 2000	No. 29 of 2000	
Transport (Amendment) Act 2000	No. 30 of 2000	
Witness Protection (Amendment) Act 2000	No. 31 of 2000	
Adoption (Amendment) Act 2000	No. 32 of 2000	
Agricultural and Veterinary Chemicals (Control of Use) (Amendment) Act 2000	No. 33 of 2000	
Arts Legislation (Amendment) Act 2000	No. 34 of 2000	
Business Registration Acts (Amendment) Act 2000	No. 35 of 2000	
Children and Young Persons (Appointment of President) Act 2000	No. 36 of 2000	
Dairy Act 2000 or the Dairy and Food Innovation Act 2000	No. 37 of 2000	6 June 2000
An Act to establish Dairy Food Safety Victoria with responsibility for dairy industry licensing and dairy food safety, to repeal the Dairy Industry Act 1992 (Note: Dairy Industry Act 1992 (No. 88 of 1992)) and for other purposes.
Electricity Industry Acts (Amendment) Act 2000	No. 38 of 2000	
Health Services (Governance) Act 2000	No. 39 of 2000	
Land (Revocation of Reservations) Act 2000	No. 40 of 2000	
Psychologists Registration Act 2000	No. 41 of 2000	
State Taxation Acts (Miscellaneous Amendments) Act 2000	No. 42 of 2000	
Tobacco (Amendment) Act 2000	No. 43 of 2000	
Victorian Law Reform Commission Act 2000	No. 44 of 2000	
Appropriation (2000/2001) Act 2000 (repealed)	No. 45 of 2000	14 June 2000
An Act for the appropriation of certain sums out of the Consolidated Fund in respect of the financial year 2000/2001 and for other purposes. (Repealed by Statute Law (Further Revision) Act 2006 (No. 29 of 2006))
Appropriation (Parliament 2000/2001) Act 2000 (repealed)	No. 46 of 2000	14 June 2000
An Act for the appropriation of certain sums out of the Consolidated Fund for the Parliament in respect of the financial year 2000/2001 and for other purposes. (Repealed by Statute Law (Further Revision) Act 2006 (No. 29 of 2006))
Control of Weapons (Amendment) Act 2000	No. 47 of 2000	
Emergency Management (Amendment) Act 2000	No. 48 of 2000	
Environment Protection (Enforcement and Penalties) Act 2000	No. 49 of 2000	
National Parks (Amendment) Act 2000	No. 50 of 2000	
Courts and Tribunals Legislation (Further Amendment) Act 2000	No. 51 of 2000	
Equal Opportunity (Gender Identity and Sexual Orientation) Act 2000	No. 52 of 2000	
Juries Act 2000	No. 53 of 2000	
Victims of Crime Assistance (Amendment) Act 2000	No. 54 of 2000	
Local Government (Restoration of Local Democracy to Melton) Act 2000	No. 55 of 2000	
Anglican Trusts Corporations (Amendment) Act 2000	No. 56 of 2000	
Associations Incorporation (Amendment) Act 2000	No. 57 of 2000	
Children and Young Persons (Reciprocal Arrangements) Act 2000	No. 58 of 2000	
Essential Services Legislation (Dispute Resolution) Act 2000	No. 59 of 2000	
Interpretation of Legislation (Amendment) Act 2000	No. 60 of 2000	
Land (St. Kilda Sea Baths) Act 2000	No. 61 of 2000	
Plant Health and Plant Products (Amendment) Act 2000	No. 62 of 2000	
Tattersall Consultations (Amendment) Act 2000	No. 63 of 2000	
Training and Further Education Acts (Amendment) Act 2000	No. 64 of 2000	
Transport (Miscellaneous Amendments) Act 2000	No. 65 of 2000	
Water Industry (Amendment) Act 2000	No. 66 of 2000	
Crimes (Amendment) Act 2000	No. 67 of 2000	
Electricity Industry Act 2000	No. 68 of 2000	21 November 2000
An Act to regulate the electricity supply industry and for other purposes.
Electricity Industry Legislation (Miscellaneous Amendments) Act 2000	No. 69 of 2000	21 November 2000
Heritage (Amendment) Act 2000	No. 70 of 2000	21 November 2000
Petroleum Products (Terminal Gate Pricing) Act 2000	No. 71 of 2000	21 November 2000
An Act to require the determination of terminal gate prices for petroleum products and for other purposes.
Project Development and Construction Management (Amendment) Act 2000	No. 72 of 2000	21 November 2000
Public Lotteries Act 2000	No. 73 of 2000	21 November 2000
Statute Law Revision Act 2000	No. 74 of 2000	21 November 2000
An Act to revise the Statute Law of Victoria.
Wrongs (Amendment) Act 2000	No. 75 of 2000	
Agricultural Industry Development (Amendment) Act 2000	No. 76 of 2000	
Country Fire Authority (Amendment) Act 2000	No. 77 of 2000	
Courts and Tribunals Legislation (Miscellaneous Amendments) Act 2000	No. 78 of 2000	
Duties Act 2000	No. 79 of 2000	28 November 2000
An Act to create and charge a number of duties, to repeal the Stamps Act 1958, (Note: Stamps Act 1958 (No. 6375)) to make consequential amendments to other Acts and for other purposes.
Fisheries (Amendment) Act 2000	No. 80 of 2000	28 November 2000
Melbourne City Link (Miscellaneous Amendments) Act 2000 (repealed)	No. 81 of 2000	28 November 2000
An Act to make miscellaneous amendments to the Melbourne City Link Act 1995, (Note: Melbourne City Link Act 1995 (No. 107 of 1995)) to repeal the Melbourne City Link Authority Act 1994, (Note: Melbourne City Link Authority Act 1994 (No. 116 of 1994)) to make minor amendments to other Acts and for other purposes. (Repealed by Statute Law (Further Revision) Act 2006 (No. 29 of 2006))
Mineral Resources Development (Amendment) Act 2000	No. 82 of 2000	
Tertiary Education (Amendment) Act 2000	No. 83 of 2000	
Transport Accident (Amendment) Act 2000	No. 84 of 2000	
Building (Legionella) Act 2000	No. 85 of 2000	
Crimes (Questioning of Suspects) Act 2000	No. 86 of 2000	
Domestic (Feral and Nuisance) Animals (Amendment) Act 2000	No. 87 of 2000	
Gambling Legislation (Miscellaneous Amendments) Act 2000	No. 88 of 2000	
Gaming Acts (Gaming Machine Levy) Act 2000	No. 89 of 2000	
Gaming No. 2 (Community Benefit) Act 2000	No. 90 of 2000	
Gas Industry Acts (Amendment) Act 2000	No. 91 of 2000	
Magistrates' Court (Committal Proceedings) Act 2000	No. 92 of 2000	
Marine (Amendment) Act 2000	No. 93 of 2000	
Nurses (Amendment) Act 2000	No. 94 of 2000	
Superannuation Acts (Beneficiary Choice) Act 2000	No. 95 of 2000	
Victorian Curriculum and Assessment Authority Act 2000	No. 96 of 2000	
Victorian Qualifications Authority Act 2000	No. 97 of 2000	
Information Privacy Act 2000	No. 98 of 2000	
Magistrates' Court (Infringements) Act 2000	No. 99 of 2000	
Planning and Environment (Restrictive Covenants) Act 2000	No. 100 of 2000	
University of Melbourne Land Act 2000	No. 101 of 2000	12 December 2000
An Act to provide for the revocation of a reservation and a Crown grant relating to land at Parkville, to provide for the re-reservation of that land and the granting of a restricted Crown grant of that land to the University of Melbourne, to repeal the Melbourne (Veterinary School) Lands Act 1970 (Note: Melbourne (Veterinary School) Lands Act 1970 (No. 7937)) and for other purposes.

== Sources ==
- "Acts as made: 2000". Victoria Legislation.
