= List of acts of the Parliament of Victoria from 2022 =

This is a list of acts of the Parliament of Victoria, Australia for the year 2022.

== 2022 ==
Short title, or popular name	Citation	Royal assent
Long title
Justice Legislation Amendment (Criminal Procedure Disclosure and Other Matters) Act 2022	No. 1 of 2022	15 February 2022
An Act to amend the Criminal Procedure Act 2009 (Note: Criminal Procedure Act 2009 (No. 7 of 2009)) in relation to disclosure obligations and applications for orders relating to non-disclosure, to amend the Magistrates' Court Act 1989, (Note: Magistrates' Court Act 1989 (No. 51 of 1989)) the Supreme Court Act 1986, (Note: Supreme Court Act 1986 (No. 110 of 1986)) the Constitution Act 1975 (Note: Constitution Act 1975 (No. 8750)) and other Acts in relation to dual commission holders, to amend the Criminal Procedure Act 2009 and the Victims' Charter Act 2006 (Note: Victims' Charter Act 2006 (No. 65 of 2006)) in relation to sentence indications, to amend the Victims' Charter Act 2006 in relation to information required to be given to victims, to amend the Personal Safety Intervention Orders Act 2010 (Note: Personal Safety Intervention Orders Act 2010 (No. 53 of 2010)) in relation to applications for personal safety intervention orders, to amend the Children, Youth and Families Act 2005 (Note: Children, Youth and Families Act 2005 (No. 96 of 2005)) in relation to the Family Division of the Children's Court and to amend the Criminal Procedure Act 2009 and the Family Violence Protection Act 2008 (Note: Family Violence Protection Act 2008 (No. 52 of 2008)) in relation to giving evidence remotely in certain proceedings and for other purposes.
Racing Amendment Act 2022	No. 2 of 2022	
Domestic Animals Amendment (Reuniting Pets and Other Matters) Act 2022	No. 3 of 2022	
Health Legislation Amendment (Quality and Safety) Act 2022	No. 4 of 2022	
Major Events Legislation Amendment (Unauthorised Ticket Packages and Other Matters) Act 2022	No. 5 of 2022	
Service Victoria Amendment Act 2022	No. 6 of 2022	
Sex Work Decriminalisation Act 2022	No. 7 of 2022	1 March 2022
An Act to decriminalise sex work, to repeal the Sex Work Act 1994, to provide for a new protected attribute in the Equal Opportunity Act 2010, (Note: Equal Opportunity Act 2010 (No. 16 of 2010)) to make consequential and related amendments to other Acts and for other purposes.
Victoria Police Amendment Act 2022	No. 8 of 2022	
Alpine Resorts Legislation Amendment Act 2022	No. 9 of 2022	
Workplace Safety Legislation and Other Matters Amendment Act 2022	No. 10 of 2022	
Justice Legislation Amendment (Trial by Judge Alone and Other Matters) Act 2022	No. 11 of 2022	
Livestock Management Amendment (Animal Activism) Act 2022	No. 12 of 2022	
Regulatory Legislation Amendment (Reform) Act 2022	No. 13 of 2022	
Conservation, Forests and Lands Amendment Act 2022	No. 14 of 2022	
Public Health and Wellbeing Amendment Act 2022	No. 15 of 2022	
Puffing Billy Railway Act 2022	No. 16 of 2022	12 April 2022
An Act to establish the Puffing Billy Railway Board, to provide for the objectives, functions and powers of the Board, to provide for matters relating to the Puffing Billy Railway, to repeal the Emerald Tourist Railway Act 1977 (Note: Emerald Tourist Railway Act 1977 (No. 9020)) and for other purposes.
Justice Legislation Amendment (Fines Reform and Other Matters) Act 2022	No. 17 of 2022	
Road Safety Legislation Amendment Act 2022	No. 18 of 2022	
Transport Legislation Amendment (Port Reforms and Other Matters) Act 2022	No. 19 of 2022	
Justice Legislation Amendment Act 2022	No. 20 of 2022	
Victims of Crime (Financial Assistance Scheme) Act 2022	No. 21 of 2022	7 June 2022
An Act to provide a new scheme for providing financial assistance to victims of crime, to amend the Victims of Crime Assistance Act 1996 (Note: Victims of Crime Assistance Act 1996 (No. 81 of 1996)) and the Victims of Crime Commissioner Act 2015, (Note: Victims of Crime Commissioner Act 2015 (No. 56 of 2015)) to make consequential amendments to other Acts and for other purposes.
Agriculture Legislation Amendment Act 2022	No. 22 of 2022	
State Taxation and Treasury Legislation Amendment Act 2022	No. 23 of 2022	
Appropriation (2022-2023) Act 2022	No. 24 of 2022	21 June 2022
An Act for the appropriation of certain sums out of the Consolidated Fund for the ordinary annual services of the Government for the financial year 2022/2023 and for other purposes.
Appropriation (Parliament 2022-2023) Act 2022	No. 25 of 2022	21 June 2022
An Act for the appropriation of certain sums out of the Consolidated Fund for the Parliament in respect of the financial year 2022/2023 and for other purposes.
Casino and Liquor Legislation Amendment Act 2022	No. 26 of 2022	
Child Employment Amendment Act 2022	No. 27 of 2022	
Gambling and Liquor Legislation Amendment Act 2022	No. 28 of 2022	
Summary Offences Amendment (Nazi Symbol Prohibition) Act 2022	No. 29 of 2022	
Local Government Legislation Amendment (Rating and Other Matters) Act 2022	No. 30 of 2022	
Sustainable Forests Timber Amendment (Timber Harvesting Safety Zones) Act 2022	No. 31 of 2022	
Education Legislation Amendment (Adult and Community Education and Other Matters) Act 2022	No. 32 of 2022	
Treaty Authority and Other Treaty Elements Act 2022	No. 33 of 2022	23 August 2022
An Act to provide for various matters in relation to the Treaty Authority, to amend the Advancing the Treaty Process with Aboriginal Victorians Act 2018 (Note: Advancing the Treaty Process with Aboriginal Victorians Act 2018 (No. 28 of 2018)) and for other purposes.
Victorian Energy Efficiency Target Amendment Act 2022	No. 34 of 2022	
Crimes Legislation Amendment Act 2022	No. 35 of 2022	
Environment Legislation Amendment (Circular Economy and Other Matters) Act 2022	No. 36 of 2022	
Justice Legislation Amendment (Police and Other Matters) Act 2022	No. 37 of 2022	
Justice Legislation Amendment (Sexual Offences and Other Matters) Act 2022	No. 38 of 2022	
Mental Health and Wellbeing Act 2022	No. 39 of 2022	6 September 2022
An Act to re-enact, with amendments, the law relating to the treatment of persons living with mental illness or experiencing psychological distress, to repeal the Mental Health Act 2014 (Note: Mental Health Act 2014 (No. 26 of 2014)) and the Victorian Collaborative Centre for Mental Health and Wellbeing Act 2021, (Note: Victorian Collaborative Centre for Mental Health and Wellbeing Act 2021 (No. 51 of 2021)) to consequentially amend other Acts and for other purposes.
Residential Tenancies, Housing and Social Services Regulation Amendment (Administration and Other Matters) Act 2022	No. 40 of 2022	
State Sport Centres Legislation Amendment Act 2022	No. 41 of 2022	
Casino Legislation Amendment (Royal Commission Implementation and Other Matters) Act 2022	No. 42 of 2022	
Early Childhood Legislation Amendment Act 2022	No. 43 of 2022	
Major Crime and Community Safety Legislation Amendment Act 2022	No. 44 of 2022	
Monitoring of Places of Detention by the United Nations Subcommittee on Prevention of Torture (OPCAT) Act 2022	No. 45 of 2022	27 September 2022
An Act to facilitate visits to places of detention and access to information by the United Nations Subcommittee on Prevention of Torture and Other Cruel, Inhuman or Degrading Treatment or Punishment in accordance with the Subcommittee's mandate under the Optional Protocol to the Convention Against Torture and Other Cruel, Inhuman or Degrading Treatment or Punishment and for other purposes.

== Sources ==
- "Acts as made: 2022". Victoria Legislation.
