= List of acts of the Parliament of Victoria from 1986 =

This is a list of acts of the Parliament of Victoria, Australia for the year 1986.

== 1986 ==
Short title, or popular name	Citation	Royal assent
Long title
Constitution (Governor's Salary and Pension) Act 1985 (repealed)	No. 1 of 1986	22 January 1986
An Act to amend Part I. of the Constitution Act 1975 (Note: Constitution Act 1975 (No. 8750)) and for other purposes. (Repealed by Statute Law Revision Act 1995 (No. 11 of 1995))
Administrative Law (University Visitor) Act 1986 (repealed)	No. 2 of 1986	25 March 1986
An Act to amend the Administrative Law Act 1978. (Note: Administrative Law Act 1978 (No. 9234)) (Repealed by Statute Law Revision Act 1995 (No. 11 of 1995))
Adoption (Amendment) Act 1986	No. 3 of 1986	25 March 1986
An Act to amend the Adoption Act 1984. (Note: Adoption Act 1984 (No. 10150))
Interpretation of Legislation (Amendment) Act 1986 (repealed)	No. 4 of 1986	25 March 1986
An Act to amend section 32 of the Interpretation of Legislation Act 1984 (Note: Interpretation of Legislation Act 1984 (No. 10096)) and for other purposes. (Repealed by Statute Law Revision Act 1995 (No. 11 of 1995))
Melbourne Sailors' Home Act 1986 (repealed)	No. 5 of 1986	25 March 1986
An Act to repeal certain Acts concerning the Melbourne Sailors' Home, to provide for trust funds held in connexion with the Melbourne Sailors' Home to be transferred to the Sailors' Welfare Fund and for other purposes. (Repealed by Melbourne Sailors' Home (Repeal) Act 2006 (No. 28 of 2006))
State Relief Committee Act 1986 (repealed)	No. 6 of 1986	25 March 1986
An Act to amend the State Relief Committee Act 1958 (Note: State Relief Committee Act 1958 (No. 6378)) and for other purposes. (Repealed by Legislation Reform (Repeals No. 1) Act 2008 (No. 10 of 2008))
Transfer of Land (Share Interests) Act 1986 (repealed)	No. 7 of 1986	25 March 1986
An Act to amend the Transfer of Land Act 1958 (Note: Transfer of Land Act 1958 (No. 6399)) and for other purposes. (Repealed by Statute Law Revision Act 1995 (No. 11 of 1995))
Building Societies Act 1986	No. 8 of 1986	8 April 1986
An Act to re-enact with amendments the law relating to Building Societies and for other purposes.
Extractive Industries (Amendment) Act 1986	No. 9 of 1986	8 April 1986
An Act to amend the Extractive Industries Act 1966 (Note: Extractive Industries Act 1966 (No. 7499)) and for other purposes.
Legal Aid Commission (Amendment) Act 1986	No. 10 of 1986	8 April 1986
An Act to amend the Legal Aid Commission Act 1978 (Note: Legal Aid Commission Act 1978 (No. 9245)) and for other purposes.
Miners' Phthisis (Treasury Allowances) Act 1986 (repealed)	No. 11 of 1986	8 April 1986
An Act to amend the Miners' Phthisis (Treasury Allowances) Act 1938 (Note: Miners' Phthisis (Treasury Allowances) Act 1938 (No. 4567)) and for other purposes. (Repealed by Statute Law Revision Act 1995 (No. 11 of 1995))
Werribee Land Act 1986	No. 12 of 1986	8 April 1986
An Act to revoke the permanent reservation of certain land and for connected purposes.
Education (Miscellaneous Matters) Act 1986 (repealed)	No. 13 of 1986	16 April 1986
An Act to amend the Education Act 1958 (Note: Education Act 1958 (No. 6240)) and the Post-Secondary Education Act 1978, (Note: Post-Secondary Education Act 1978 (No. 9145)) to make consequential amendments to the Local Government Act 1958 (Note: Local Government Act 1958 (No. 6299)) and the Teaching Service Act 1981 (Note: Education Service Act 1981 (No. 9714)) and for other purposes. (Repealed by Legislation Reform (Repeals No. 2) Act 2008 (No. 16 of 2008))
State Bank (Amendment) Act 1986	No. 14 of 1986	16 April 1986
An Act to make further provision for Government guarantees for the State Bank, to amend the State Bank Act 1958 (Note: State Savings Bank Act 1958 (No. 6379)) and for other purposes.
Zoological Parks and Gardens (Amendment) Act 1986	No. 15 of 1986	16 April 1986
An Act to amend the Zoological Parks and Gardens Act 1967 (Note: Zoological Gardens Act 1967 (No. 7518)) and for other purposes.
Courts Amendment Act 1986	No. 16 of 1986	22 April 1986
An Act to make provision for reserve judges in the Supreme Court and County Court, to make certain changes to the jurisdiction and management of the courts, to amend certain Acts and for other purposes.
Crown Intellectual Property (Assignment) (Amendment) Act 1986 (repealed)	No. 17 of 1986	22 April 1986
An Act to amend the Crown Intellectual Property (Assignment) Act 1983 (Note: Crown Intellectual Property (Assignment) Act 1983 (No. 9939)) and for other purposes. (Repealed by Statute Law Revision Act 1995 (No. 11 of 1995))
La Trobe University (Amendment) Act 1986 (repealed)	No. 18 of 1986	22 April 1986
An Act to amend the La Trobe University Act 1964 (Note: La Trobe University Act 1964 (No. 7189)) and for other purposes. (Repealed by Statute Law Revision Act 1995 (No. 11 of 1995))
Lotteries Gaming and Betting (Amendment) Act 1986	No. 19 of 1986	22 April 1986
An Act to amend the Lotteries Gaming and Betting Act 1966, (Note: Lotteries Gaming and Betting Act 1966 (No. 7429)) the Stamps Act 1958 (Note: Stamps Act 1958 (No. 6375)) and the Racing Act 19588 (Note: Racing Act 1958 (No. 6353)) and for other purposes.
Post-Secondary Education (Amendment) Act 1986	No. 20 of 1986	22 April 1986
An Act to amend the Post-Secondary Education Act 1978 and for other purposes.
Public Contracts (Repeal) Act 1986 (repealed)	No. 21 of 1986	22 April 1986
An Act to repeal the Public Contracts Act 1958 (Note: Public Contracts Act 1958 (No. 6347)) and for other purposes. (Repealed by Statute Law Revision Act 1995 (No. 11 of 1995))
Tattersall Consultations (Amendment) Act 1986 (repealed)	No. 22 of 1986	22 April 1986
An Act to amend the Tattersall Consultations Act 1958. (Note: Tattersall Consultations Act 1958 (No. 6390)) (Repealed by Statute Law Revision Act 1995 (No. 11 of 1995))
Taxation Acts (Reciprocal Assistance) Act 1986 (repealed)	No. 23 of 1986	22 April 1986
An Act to make further provision for reciprocal assistance between State and Commonwealth taxation officers and for that purpose to amend certain Acts. (Repealed by Statute Law Revision Act 1995 (No. 11 of 1995))
Decentralized Industry (Housing) Repeal Act 1986	No. 24 of 1986	29 April 1986
An Act to repeal the Decentralized Industry (Housing) Act 1973 (Note: Decentralized Industry (Housing) Act 1973 (No. 8409)) and for other purposes.
Extractive Industries (Lysterfield) Act 1986	No. 25 of 1986	6 May 1986
An Act to ratify, validate, approve and otherwise give the force of law to an Agreement relating to a quarry site at Lysterfield and its reclamation and for other purposes.
Mines (Amendment) Act 1986 (repealed)	No. 26 of 1986	6 May 1986
An Act to amend the Mines Act 1958, (Note: Mines Act 1958 (No. 6320)) to repeal the Gelliondale Land (Mineral Lease) Act 1950 (Note: Gelliondale Land (Mineral Lease) Act 1950 (No. 5504)) and for other purposes. (Repealed by Statute Law Revision Act 1995 (No. 11 of 1995))
Pollution of Waters by Oil and Noxious Substances Act 1986	No. 27 of 1986	20 May 1986
An Act relating to the protection of the sea and certain waters from pollution by oil and other noxious substances, to amend the Navigable Waters (Oil Pollution) Act 1960 (Note: Navigable Waters (Oil Pollution) Act 1960 (No. 6705)) and for other purposes.
Racing (Amendment) Act 1986	No. 28 of 1986	20 May 1986
An Act to amend the Racing Act 1958 and for other purposes.
Public Records (Amendment) Act 1986 (repealed)	No. 29 of 1986	20 May 1986
An Act to amend the Public Records Act 1973 (Note: Public Records Act 1973 (No. 8418)) and for other purposes. (Repealed by Statute Law Revision (Repeals) Act 1999 (No. 3 of 1999))
Emergency Management Act 1986	No. 30 of 1986	20 May 1986
An Act to provide for the management and organization of the prevention of, response to and recovery from emergencies, to repeal the State Disasters Act 1983 (Note: State Disasters Act 1983 (No. 10010)) and for other purposes.
Supply (1986-87, No. 1) Act 1986 (repealed)	No. 31 of 1986	20 May 1986
An Act to make interim provision for the appropriation of moneys out of the Consolidated Fund for the recurrent services and for certain works and purposes for the financial year 1986-87. (Repealed by Statute Law Revision (Repeals) Act 1999 (No. 3 of 1999))
Works and Services (Ancillary Provisions) Act 1986 (repealed)	No. 32 of 1986	20 May 1986
An Act to make ancillary provisions for certain works and purposes for the financial year 1986-87. (Repealed by Statute Law Revision (Repeals) Act 1999 (No. 3 of 1999))
State Electricity Commission (Amendment) Act 1986	No. 33 of 1986	20 May 1986
An Act to amend the State Electricity Commission Act 1958 (Note: State Electricity Commission Act 1958 (No. 6377)) and the Electric Light and Power Act 1958 (Note: Electric Light and Power Act 1958 (No. 6241)) and for other purposes.
Lotteries Gaming and Betting (Amusement Machines) Act 1986 (repealed)	No. 34 of 1986	20 May 1986
An Act to regulate the amusement machine industry and for other purposes. (Repealed by Statute Law Revision Act 1995 (No. 11 of 1995))
Taxation (Interest on Overpayments) Act 1986	No. 35 of 1986	20 May 1986
An Act to make provision for the payment of interest in respect of certain overpayments of tax to amend certain Acts and for other purposes.
Land (Miscellaneous Matters) Act 1986	No. 36 of 1986	20 May 1986
An Act to amend the Land Act 1958 (Note: Land Act 1958 (No. 6284)) and the Local Government Act 1958, to revoke the permanent reservations of certain lands and for connected purposes.
Crimes (Amendment) Act 1986 (repealed)	No. 37 of 1986	20 May 1986
An Act to abolish the right of a legally represented accused person to make an unsworn statement, to make provision with respect to the punishment of persons convicted of murder and certain other offences, to amend the Crimes Act 1958, (Note: Crimes Act 1958 (No. 6231)) the Evidence Act 1958 (Note: Evidence Act 1958 (No. 6246)) and the Magistrates (Summary Proceedings) Act 1975 (Note: Magistrates (Summary Proceedings) Act 1975 (No. 8731)) and for other purposes. (Repealed by Statute Law Revision Act 1995 (No. 11 of 1995))
Legal Profession Practice (Amendment) Act 1986	No. 38 of 1986	20 May 1986
An Act relating to the funds of the Victoria Law Foundation, to amend the Legal Profession Practice Act 1958, (Note: Legal Profession Practice Act 1958 (No. 6291)) the Law Reform Commission Act 1984 (Note: Law Reform Commission Act 1984 (No. 10131)) and the Victoria Law Foundation Act 1978 (Note: Victoria Law Foundation Act 1978 (No. 9174)) and for other purposes.
Southgate Project Act 1986	No. 39 of 1986	20 May 1986
An Act relating to certain land in the City of South Melbourne and for other purposes.
Pathology Services Accreditation (Amendment) Act 1986	No. 40 of 1986	20 May 1986
An Act to amend the Pathology Services Accreditation Act 1984 (Note: Pathology Services Accreditation Act 1984 (No. 10083)) and for other purposes.
Children's Court (Amendment) Act 1986 (repealed)	No. 41 of 1986	20 May 1986
An Act to amend the Children's Court Act 1973 (Note: Children's Court Act 1973 (No. 8477)) and the Community Welfare Services Act 1970 (Note: Social Welfare Act 1970 (No. 8089)) and for other purposes. (Repealed by Statute Law Revision (Repeals) Act 1999 (No. 3 of 1999))
Youth Affairs Act 1986	No. 42 of 1986	20 May 1986
An Act to establish a separate legislative framework for youth affairs, to continue the Youth Policy Development Council in existence, to amend the Youth, Sport and Recreation Act 1972 (Note: Youth, Sport and Recreation Act 1972 (No. 8344)) and the Education Act 1958 and for other purposes.
Small Business Development Corporation (Amendment) Act 1986 (repealed)	No. 43 of 1986	20 May 1986
An Act to amend the Small Business Development Corporation Act 1976. (Note: Small Business Development Corporation Act 1976 (No. 8854)) (Repealed by Statute Law Revision Act 1995 (No. 11 of 1995))
National Parks (Amendment) Act 1986 (repealed)	No. 44 of 1986	20 May 1986
An Act to provide for the enlargement and amalgamation of existing parks, to establish new parks, to vary the boundaries of existing parks, to amend the National Parks Act 1975 (Note: National Parks Act 1975 (No. 8702)) and for other purposes. (Repealed by Legislation Reform (Repeals No. 2) Act 2008 (No. 16 of 2008))
Fire Authorities (Amendment) Act 1986 (repealed)	No. 45 of 1986	20 May 1986
An Act to amend the Country Fire Authority Act 1958 (Note: Country Fire Authority Act 1958 (No. 6228)) and the Metropolitan Fire Brigades Act 1958. (Note: Metropolitan Fire Brigades Act 1958 (No. 6315)) (Repealed by Statute Law Revision Act 1995 (No. 11 of 1995))
Prevention of Cruelty to Animals Act 1986	No. 46 of 1986	20 May 1986
An Act to make changes to the law relating to the prevention of cruelty to animals, to repeal the Protection of Animals Act 1966 (Note: Protection of Animals Act 1966 (No. 7432)) and for other purposes.
Young Offenders (Interstate Transfer) Act 1986	No. 47 of 1986	27 May 1986
An Act to provide for the transfer of young offenders into, out of and through Victoria, to amend the Community Welfare Services Act 1970 and for other purposes.
Accident Compensation (Amendment) Act 1986 (repealed)	No. 48 of 1986	27 May 1986
An Act to make miscellaneous amendments to the Accident Compensation Act 1985, (Note: Accident Compensation Act 1985 (No. 10191)) the Workers Compensation Act 1958 (Note: Workers Compensation Act 1958 (No. 6419)) and the Motor Accidents Act 1973 (Note: Motor Accidents Act 1973 (No. 8429)) and for other purposes. (Repealed by Statute Law Revision Act 1995 (No. 11 of 1995))
Liquor Control (Further Amendment) Act 1986 (repealed)	No. 49 of 1986	27 May 1986
An Act to further amend the Liquor Control Act 1968 (Note: Liquor Control Act 1968 (No. 7695)) and to amend the Labour and Industry Act 1958 (Note: Labour and Industry Act 1958 (No. 6283)) and for other purposes. (Repealed by Statute Law Revision Act 1995 (No. 11 of 1995))
Victorian Curriculum and Assessment Board Act 1986	No. 50 of 1986	27 May 1986
An Act to establish the Victorian Curriculum and Assessment Board to repeal the Victorian Institute of Secondary Education Act 1976 (Note: Victorian Institute of Secondary Education Act 1976 (No. 8904)) and to amend the Public Service Act 1974 (Note: Public Service Act 1974 (No. 8658)) and for other purposes.
Road Construction Authority (Lands) Act 1986 (repealed)	No. 51 of 1986	27 May 1986
An Act to authorize the Road Construction Authority to acquire certain recreational lands and for other purposes. (Repealed by Statute Law Revision Act 2013 (No. 70 of 2013)
Travel Agents Act 1986 (repealed)	No. 52 of 1986	27 May 1986
An Act to provide for the licensing of travel agents and the regulation of their operations and for other purposes. (Repealed by Travel Agents Repeal Act 2014 (No. 16 of 2014))
Intellectually Disabled Persons' Services Act 1986 (repealed)	No. 53 of 1986	27 May 1986
An Act to provide for the care, treatment and protection of intellectually disabled persons, to define the role of the Minister and the Department of Community Services with respect to intellectually disabled persons and the provision of services, to establish an Intellectual Disability Review Panel and for other purposes. (Repealed by Disability Act 2006 (No. 23 of 2006))
Industrial Relations (Amendment) Act 1986	No. 54 of 1986	27 May 1986
An Act to amend the Industrial Relations Act 1979 and for other purposes. (Note: Industrial Relations Act 1979 (No. 9365))
Alpine Resorts (Amendment) Act 1986	No. 55 of 1986	27 May 1986
An Act to increase the area of the Falls Creek Alpine Resort, to amend the Alpine Resorts Act 1983 (Note: Alpine Resorts Act 1983 (No. 9974)) and for other purposes.
Futures Industry (Application of Laws) Act 1986	No. 56 of 1986	27 May 1986
An Act relating to the establishment and maintenance of futures markets, and the making of futures contracts, in Victoria, to provide for the licensing of futures brokers and certain other persons, and for related purposes.
Biological Control Act 1986	No. 57 of 1986	27 May 1986
An Act to make provision for the biological control of pests in Victoria and for other purposes.
Guardianship and Administration Act 1986 (repealed)	No. 58 of 1986	3 June 1986
An Act to provide for the establishment of a Guardianship and Administration Board, to provide for the appointment of a Public Advocate, to amend the Public Trustee Act 1958 (Note: Public Trustee Act 1958 (No. 6350)) and for other purposes. (Repealed by Guardianship and Administration Act 2019 (No. 13 of 2019))
Mental Health Act 1986 (repealed)	No. 59 of 1986	3 June 1986
An Act to provide for the care, treatment and protection of persons who are mentally ill, to establish a Mental Health Review Board, to define the role of the Department of Health with respect to mental health, to repeal the Mental Health Act 1959 (Note: Mental Health Act 1959 (No. 6605)) and for other purposes. (Repealed by Mental Health Act 2014 (No. 26 of 2014))
Cemeteries (Amendment) Act 1986 (repealed)	No. 60 of 1986	16 September 1986
An Act to validate certain rights of burial at the Melbourne General Cemetery, to amend the Cemeteries Act 1958 (Note: Cemeteries Act 1958 (No. 6217)) and for other purposes. (Repealed by Statute Law Revision Act 1995 (No. 11 of 1995))
Constitution (British Subjects) Act 1986 (repealed)	No. 61 of 1986	16 September 1986
An Act to amend provisions of the Constitution Act 1975 and certain other Acts relating to persons having the status of British subjects and for other purposes. (Repealed by Statute Law Revision Act 1995 (No. 11 of 1995))
Estate Agents (Amendment) Act 1986	No. 62 of 1986	16 September 1986
An Act to make further provision for the membership of the Estate Agents Board, to amend the Estate Agents Act 1980 (Note: Estate Agents Act 1980 (No. 9428)) and for other purposes.
Supreme Court (Rules of Procedure) Act 1986	No. 63 of 1986	16 September 1986
An Act to ratify, validate and approve certain Rules of the Supreme Court, to amend the Supreme Court Act 1958 (Note: Supreme Court Act 1958 (No. 6387)) and for other purposes.
Victoria Conservation Trust (Amendments) Act 1986	No. 64 of 1986	16 September 1986
An Act to amend the Victoria Conservation Trust Act 1972 (Note: Victoria Conservation Trust Act 1972 (No. 8350)) and for other purposes.
Geelong Regional Commission (Amendment) Act 1986	No. 65 of 1986	23 September 1986
An Act to amend the Geelong Regional Commission Act 1977 (Note: Geelong Regional Commission Act 1977 (No. 9024)) and for other purposes.
Racing (Sunday Racing and Betting) Act 1986 (repealed)	No. 66 of 1986	23 September 1986
An Act to amend the Racing Act 1958 and the Sunday Entertainment Act 1967 (Note: Sunday Entertainment Act 1967 (No. 7634)) to allow racing and betting on racing on Sunday, 28 September 1986 and for other purposes. (Repealed by Statute Law Revision Act 1995 (No. 11 of 1995))
Town and Country Planning (Miscellaneous Provisions) Act 1986 (repealed)	No. 67 of 1986	23 September 1986
An Act to give the Melbourne Corporation and the Melbourne City Council certain powers in relation to the payment of costs and to amend the Town and Country Planning Act 1961 (Note: Town and Country Planning Act 1961 (No. 6849)) and for other purposes. (Repealed by Legislation Reform (Repeals No. 3) Act 2008 (No. 53 of 2008))
Petroleum (Submerged Lands) (Amendment) Act 1986 (repealed)	No. 68 of 1986	14 October 1986
An Act to amend the Petroleum (Submerged Lands) Act 1982 (Note: Petroleum (Submerged Lands) Act 1982 (No. 9772)) and for other purposes. (Repealed by Legislation Reform (Repeals No. 2) Act 2008 (No. 16 of 2008))
Country Fire Authority (Amendment) Act 1986	No. 69 of 1986	28 October 1986
An Act to amend the Country Fire Authority Act 1958. (Note: Country Fire Authority Act 1958 (No. 6228))
Dairy Industry (Milk Price) Act 1986 (repealed)	No. 70 of 1986	6 November 1986
An Act to amend the Dairy Industry Act 1984. (Note: Dairy Industry Act 1984 (No. 10171)) (Repealed by Statute Law Revision Act 1995 (No. 11 of 1995))
Forests (Bowater-Scott Agreement) Act 1986	No. 71 of 1986	6 November 1986
An Act to ratify, validate, approve and otherwise give effect to an agreement with Bowater-Scott Limited and for other purposes.
Martial Arts Control Act 1986	No. 72 of 1986	6 November 1986
An Act to provide for controls over the martial arts and for other purposes.
National Tennis Centre (Amendment) Act 1986	No. 73 of 1986	6 November 1986
An Act to amend the National Tennis Centre Act 1985. (Note: National Tennis Centre Act 1985 (No. 10206))
Post-Secondary Education Remuneration Tribunal (Repeal) Act 1986 (repealed)	No. 74 of 1986	6 November 1986
An Act to give the Industrial Relations Commission of Victoria jurisdiction over the terms and conditions of employment of staff employed by certain academic institutions, to repeal the Post-Secondary Education Remuneration Tribunal Act 1980, (Note: Post-Secondary Education Remuneration Tribunal Act 1980 (No. 9485)) to amend the Council of Adult Education Act 1981 (Note: Council of Adult Education Act 1981 (No. 9595)) and the Industrial Relations Act 1979 and for other purposes. (Repealed by Statute Law Revision (Repeals) Act 1999 (No. 3 of 1999))
Emergency Management (Amendment) Act 1986	No. 75 of 1986	18 November 1986
An Act to amend the Emergency Management Act 1986 (Note: Emergency Management Act 1986 (No. 30 of 1986)) and for other purposes.
Labour and Industry (Registration Fees) Act 1986 (repealed)	No. 76 of 1986	18 November 1986
An Act to amend the Labour and Industry Act 1958 and for other purposes. (Repealed by Statute Law Revision Act 1995 (No. 11 of 1995))
Pay-roll Tax (Amendment) Act 1986 (repealed)	No. 77 of 1986	18 November 1986
An Act to amend the Pay-roll Tax Act 1971 (Note: Pay-roll Tax Act 1971 (No. 8154)) and for other purposes. (Repealed by Statute Law Revision Act 1995 (No. 11 of 1995))
Rural Finance (Amendment) Act 1986 (repealed)	No. 78 of 1986	18 November 1986
An Act to amend the Rural Finance Act 1958 (Note: Rural Finance Corporation Act 1958 (No. 6360)) and the Rural Finance and Settlement Commission Act 1961 (Note: Rural Finance and Settlement Commission Act 1961 (No. 6846)) and for other purposes. (Repealed by Statute Law Revision Act 1995 (No. 11 of 1995))
Fisheries (Master Fisherman's Licences) Act 1986 (repealed)	No. 79 of 1986	25 November 1986
An Act to provide for the transfer of certain master fisherman's licences, to amend the Fisheries Act 1968 (Note: Fisheries Act 1968 (No. 7780)) and for other purposes. (Repealed by Statute Law Revision Act 1995 (No. 11 of 1995))
Hospitals (Powers) Act 1986	No. 80 of 1986	25 November 1986
An Act to make further provision with respect to the powers of certain hospitals, to amend the Health Act 1958, (Note: Health Act 1958 (No. 6270)) the Cancer Act 1958 (Note: Cancer Act 1958 (No. 6213)) and the Hospitals and Charities Act 1958 (Note: Hospitals and Charities Act 1958 (No. 6274)) and for other purposes.
Land Tax (Amendment) Act 1986 (repealed)	No. 81 of 1986	25 November 1986
An Act to amend the Land Tax Act 1958 (Note: Land Tax Act 1958 (No. 6289)) and for other purposes. (Repealed by Statute Law Revision Act 1995 (No. 11 of 1995))
Local Government Acts (Miscellaneous Amendments) Act 1986	No. 82 of 1986	25 November 1986
An Act to make miscellaneous amendments to certain Acts administered by the Minister for Local Government and for other purposes.
State Bank (Further Amendment) Act 1986	No. 83 of 1986	25 November 1986
An Act to amend Part I. of the State Bank Act 1958 and the Shrine of Remembrance Act 1978 (Note: Shrine of Remembrance Act 1978 (No. 9167)) and for other purposes.
Works and Services (Further Ancillary Provisions) Act 1986 (repealed)	No. 84 of 1986	25 November 1986
An Act to make further ancillary provisions for certain works and purposes for the financial year 1986-87. (Repealed by Statute Law Revision (Repeals) Act 1999 (No. 3 of 1999))
Appropriation (1986-87, No. 1) Act 1986 (repealed)	No. 85 of 1986	25 November 1986
(Repealed by Statute Law Revision (Repeals) Act 1999 (No. 3 of 1999))
Water (Miscellaneous Amendments) Act 1986	No. 86 of 1986	2 December 1986
An Act to amend the Water Act 1958, (Note: Water Act 1958 (No. 6413)) the Drainage of Land Act 1975, (Note: Drainage of Land Act 1975 (No. 8811)) the Geelong Waterworks and Sewerage Act 1958, (Note: Geelong Waterworks and Sewerage Act 1958 (No. 6263)) the Latrobe Valley Act 1958, (Note: Latrobe Valley Act 1958 (No. 6290)) the Mildura Irrigation Trusts and Sunraysia Water Board Act 1958, (Note: Mildura Irrigation and Water Trusts Act 1958 (No. 6316)) the Planning Appeals Board Act 1980, (Note: Planning Appeals Board Act 1980 (No. 9512)) the Sewerage Districts Act 1958, (Note: Sewerage Districts Act 1958 (No. 6368)) the Water and Sewerage Authorities (Restructuring) Act 1983, (Note: Water and Sewerage Authorities (Restructuring) Act 1983 (No. 9895)) the Water and Sewerage Authorities (Further Restructuring) Act 1984 (Note: Water and Sewerage Authorities (Further Restructuring) Act 1984 (No. 10048)) and for other purposes.
Shop Trading (Temporary Provisions) Act 1986	No. 87 of 1986	9 December 1986
An Act to make certain changes to shop trading hours and for other purposes.
Taxation Acts (Amendment) Act 1986	No. 88 of 1986	9 December 1986
An Act to amend the Stamps Act 1958, the Business Franchise Acts, the Energy Consumption Levy Act 1982, (Note: Energy Consumption Levy Act 1982 (No. 9846)) the Financial Institutions Duty Act 1982 (Note: Financial Institutions Duty Act 1982 (No. 9850)) and for other purposes.
Bail (Amendment) Act 1986	No. 89 of 1986	16 December 1986
An Act to amend the Bail Act 1977 (Note: Bail Act 1977 (No. 9008)) and the Magistrates' Courts Act 1971 (Note: Magistrates' Courts Act 1971 (No. 8184)) and for other purposes.
Building Control (Amendment) Act 1986 (repealed)	No. 90 of 1986	16 December 1986
An Act to amend Part VI. of the Building Control Act 1981 (Note: Building Control Act 1981 (No. 9720)) and for other purposes. (Repealed by Statute Law Revision Act 1995 (No. 11 of 1995))
Building Societies (Amendment) Act 1986 (repealed)	No. 91 of 1986	16 December 1986
An Act to amend the Building Societies Act 1986. (Note: Building Societies Act 1986 (No. 8 of 1986)) (Repealed by Statute Law Revision Act 1995 (No. 11 of 1995))
Commonwealth Powers (Family Law-Children) Act 1986	No. 92 of 1986	16 December 1986
An Act to refer to the Parliament of the Commonwealth certain matters relating to Family Law.
Egg Industry Stabilization (Amendment) Act 1986	No. 93 of 1986	16 December 1986
An Act to amend the Egg Industry Stabilization Act 1983. (Note: Egg Industry Stabilization Act 1983 (No. 10024))
Emergency Services Superannuation Act 1986	No. 94 of 1986	16 December 1986
An Act to establish an Emergency Services Superannuation Board and Scheme, to amend the Superannuation Act 1958, (Note: Superannuation Act 1958 (No. 6386)) the Hospitals Superannuation Act 1965 (Note: Hospitals Superannuation Act 1965 (No. 7354)) and the Metropolitan Fire Brigades Superannuation Act 1976 (Note: Metropolitan Fire Brigades Superannuation Act 1976 (No. 8952)) and for other purposes.
Food (Amendment) Act 1986	No. 95 of 1986	16 December 1986
An Act to amend the Food Act 1984 (Note: Food Act 1984 (No. 10082)) and for other purposes.
Listening Devices (Amendment) Act 1986 (repealed)	No. 96 of 1986	16 December 1986
An Act to amend the Listening Devices Act 1969 (Note: Listening Devices Act 1969 (No. 7804)) and for other purposes. (Repealed by Statute Law Revision Act 1995 (No. 11 of 1995))
Melbourne (Widening of Streets) (Repeal) Act 1986	No. 97 of 1986	16 December 1986
An Act to repeal the Melbourne (Widening of Streets) Act 1940 (Note: Melbourne (Widening of Streets) Act 1940 (No. 4760)) and the Melbourne (Widening of Streets) Act 1943 (Note: Melbourne (Widening of Streets) Act 1943 (No. 4991)) and for other purposes.
State Electricity Commission (Further Amendment) Act 1986	No. 98 of 1986	16 December 1986
An Act to further amend the State Electricity Commission Act 1958 and the Electric Light and Power Act 1958 and for other purposes.
South Melbourne Land Act 1986	No. 99 of 1986	16 December 1986
An Act to make provision for the redevelopment of part of the south bank of the Yarra River and for other purposes.
Transport (Amendment) Act 1986	No. 100 of 1986	16 December 1986
An Act to amend the Transport Act 1983 (Note: Transport Act 1983 (No. 9921)) and for other purposes.
Crimes (Confiscation of Profits) Act 1986 (repealed)	No. 101 of 1986	16 December 1986
An Act to provide for the confiscation of the profits of crime and the forfeiture and destruction or disposal of property in certain circumstances, to amend the Drugs, Poisons and Controlled Substances Act 1981, (Note: Drugs, Poisons and Controlled Substances Act 1981 (No. 9719)) the Summary Offences Act 1966, (Note: Summary Offences Act 1966 (No. 7405)) the Crimes Act 1958, the Evidence Act 1958 and for other purposes. (Repealed by Confiscation Act 1997 (No. 108 of 1997))
Crimes (Proceedings) Act 1986 (repealed)	No. 102 of 1986	16 December 1986
An Act to amend the Crimes Act 1958, the Magistrates (Summary Proceedings) Act 1975 and the Coroners Act 1985 (Note: Coroners Act 1985 (No. 10257)) and for other purposes. (Repealed by Statute Law Revision Act 1995 (No. 11 of 1995))
Environment Protection Agencies Staff Transfer Act 1986	No. 103 of 1986	16 December 1986
An Act to provide for the transfer to the Public Service of certain staff of the Dandenong Valley Authority and the Latrobe Valley Water and Sewerage Board and for other purposes.
Motor Car Traders Act 1986	No. 104 of 1986	16 December 1986
An Act to provide for the licensing of motor car traders and the regulation of their operation and for other purposes.
Pre-school Teachers and Assistants (Sick Leave) Act 1986	No. 105 of 1986	16 December 1986
An Act to amend the Pre-school Teachers and Assistants (Portability of Long Service Leave) Act 1984 (Note: Pre-school Teachers and Assistants (Portability of Long Service Leave) Act 1984 (No. 10135)) and for other purposes.
Retail Tenancies Act 1986 (repealed)	No. 106 of 1986	16 December 1986
An Act to regulate retail tenancy agreements, to provide for the determination of disputes arising under such agreements and for other purposes. (Repealed by Retail Tenancies Reform Act 1998 (No. 14 of 1998))
Courts (Further Amendment) Act 1986	No. 107 of 1986	16 December 1986
An Act to make certain amendments to the Magistrates' Courts Act 1971, the County Court Act 1958, (Note: County Court Act 1958 (No. 6230)) the Strata Titles Act 1967, (Note: Strata Titles Act 1967 (No. 7551)) the Cluster Titles Act 1974, (Note: Cluster Titles Act 1974 (No. 8661)) the Courts Amendment Act 1986, (Note: Courts Amendment Act 1986 (Courts Amendment Act 1986)) the companies and securities' scheme legislation and the Magistrates (Summary Proceedings) Act 1975 and for other purposes.
Local Government (General Amendment) Act 1986	No. 108 of 1986	16 December 1986
An Act to amend the Local Government Act 1958 and for other purposes.
State Concessions Act 1986	No. 109 of 1986	16 December 1986
An Act to provide definitions of eligibility for certain concessions, to amend provisions in certain Acts for concessions and for other purposes.
Supreme Court Act 1986	No. 110 of 1986	16 December 1986
An Act to amend and consolidate the law relating to the Supreme Court, to repeal the Supreme Court Act 1958, to amend the Constitution Act 1975, to amend various Acts in relation to procedure in the Supreme Court, to vary the law applicable to civil litigation in Victoria and for other purposes.
Transport Accident Act 1986	No. 111 of 1986	16 December 1986
An Act to establish a scheme of compensation in respect of persons who are injured or die as a result of transport accidents and for other purposes.
Trustee (Amendment) Act 1986	No. 112 of 1986	16 December 1986
An Act to amend Part I of the Trustee Act 1958 (Note: Trustee Act 1958 (No. 6401)) and for other purposes.
Water Acts (Further Amendment) Act 1986	No. 113 of 1986	16 December 1986
An Act to make miscellaneous amendments to the Water Act 1958, the Dandenong Valley Authority Act 1963, (Note: Dandenong Valley Authority Act 1963 (No. 7060)) the Groundwater Act 1969, (Note: Groundwater Act 1969 (No. 7849)) the River Improvement Act 1958, (Note: River Improvement Act 1958 (No. 6358)) the Sewerage Districts Act 1958 and the West Moorabool Water Board Act 1968 (Note: West Moorabool Water Board Act 1968 (No. 7698)) and for other purposes.
Ambulance Services Act 1986	No. 114 of 1986	23 December 1986
Annual Reporting (Amendment) Act 1986	No. 115 of 1986	23 December 1986
An Act to amend the Annual Reporting Act 1983 (Note: Annual Reporting Act 1983 (No. 9941)) and for other purposes.
Construction Industry Long Service Leave (Amendment) Act 1986	No. 116 of 1986	23 December 1986
An Act to amend the Construction Industry Long Service Leave Act 1983 (Note: Construction Industry Long Service Leave Act 1983 (No. 9935)) and for other purposes.
Corrections Act 1986	No. 117 of 1986	23 December 1986
An Act to make provision for the administration and management of correctional services to make consequential amendments to certain Acts and for other purposes.
Education (Amendment) Act 1986	No. 118 of 1986	23 December 1986
An Act to amend the Education Act 1958 and the Post-Secondary Education Act 1978 and to repeal the State Schools (Bush Fire Relief) Act 1943 (Note: State Schools (Bush Fire Relief) Act 1943 (No. 4954)) and for other purposes.
Friendly Societies Act 1986 (repealed)	No. 119 of 1986	23 December 1986
An Act to re-enact with amendments the law relating to Friendly Societies and for other purposes. (Repealed by Friendly Societies (Victoria) Act 1996 (No. 83 of 1996))
Industrial and Provident Societies (Amendment) Act 1986	No. 120 of 1986	23 December 1986
An Act to amend the Industrial and Provident Societies Act 1958 (Note: Industrial and Provident Societies Act 1958 (No. 6277)) and the Co-operation Act 1981. (Note: Co-operation Act 1981 (No. 8718))
Land Acquisition and Compensation Act 1986	No. 121 of 1986	23 December 1986
An Act to establish a new procedure for the acquisition of land for public purposes, to provide for the determination of compensation, and for other purposes.
Land (Amendment and Miscellaneous Matters) Act 1986	No. 122 of 1986	23 December 1986
An Act to make provision for the sale of certain Crown land and to revoke the permanent reservations of certain land and for other purposes.
Port Authorities (Amendment) Act 1986 (repealed)	No. 123 of 1986	23 December 1986
An Act to amend the Port of Geelong Authority Act 1958, (Note: Geelong Harbor Trust Act 1958 (No. 6262)) the Port of Melbourne Authority Act 1958, (Note: Melbourne Harbor Trust Act 1958 (No. 6312)) the Port of Portland Authority Act 1958, (Note: Portland Harbor Trust Act 1958 (No. 6340)) the Harbor Boards Act 1958 (Note: Harbor Boards Act 1958 (No. 6268)) and the Transport Act 1983 and for other purposes. (Repealed by Statute Law Repeals Act 2012 (No. 30 of 2012))
Prostitution Regulation Act 1986 (repealed)	No. 124 of 1986	23 December 1986
An Act to make provision with respect to prostitution, to establish a licensing system for brothels, to amend the Crimes Act 1958, the Health Act 1958, the Maintenance Act 1965, (Note: Maintenance Act 1965 (No. 7289)) the Summary Offences Act 1966, the Town and Country Planning Act 1961, the Vagrancy Act 1966 (Note: Vagrancy Act 1966 (No. 7393)) and the Liquor Control Act 1968, to abolish the offence at common law of keeping a disorderly house and for other purposes. (Repealed by Prostitution Control Act 1994 (No. 102 of 1994))
Racing (Miscellaneous Amendments) Act 1986 (repealed)	No. 125 of 1986	23 December 1986
An Act to make amendments to the Racing Act 1958, the Lotteries, Gaming and Betting Act 1966 and the Stamps Act 1958 and for other purposes. (Repealed by Statute Law Revision Act 1995 (No. 11 of 1995))
Retirement Villages Act 1986	No. 126 of 1986	23 December 1986
An Act to make provision concerning Retirement Villages and for other purposes.
Road Safety Act 1986	No. 127 of 1986	23 December 1986
An Act to re-enact, with amendments, the law relating to motor vehicles, to repeal the Motor Car Act 1958, (Note: Motor Car Act 1958 (No. 6325)) to make consequential amendments to various Acts and for other purposes.
Transfer of Land (Conversion) Act 1986 (repealed)	No. 128 of 1986	23 December 1986
An Act to amend the Transfer of Land Act 1958 and the Property Law Act 1958 (Note: Property Law Act 1958 (No. 6344)) and for other purposes. (Repealed by Statute Law Revision Act 1995 (No. 11 of 1995))

== Sources ==
- "1986 Victorian Historical Acts". AustLII.
