= The Code: Crime and Justice =

Australian television program

- Genre: Observational Documentary
- Presented by: William McInnes
- Starring: Josh Ercoli
- Country of origin: Australia
- Original language: English
- No. of seasons: 1
- No. of episodes: 3

Production
- Producer: Craig Graham

Original release
- Network: Nine Network
- Release: 5 February – 19 February 2007

The Code: Crime and Justice is an Australian observational reality legal television series that aired on the Nine Network in February 2007. It was produced by Craig Graham and narrated by William McInnes. The Code followed Victoria police in the field, as well as cases brought to the Magistrates' Court of Victoria. Permission to film in the Court was granted by Chief Magistrate Ian Gray – a level of access considered unprecedented on Australian television.

== Episodes ==
No.	Title	Original release date	Aus. viewers (millions)
1	"Someone is going to jail"	5 February 2007	1.00
2	"Someone is hiding the truth"	12 February 2007	1.62
3	"Someone's home's a crime scene"	19 February 2007	N/A

== Production ==
While filming in January 2007, the camera crew was trailing police as they made armed entry into an apartment based on a call about a possible murder. The "corpse" reported by a neighbour turned out to be a mannequin.

Thirteen episodes were planned. Due to poor viewership performance, The Code was replaced by What's Good For You on the schedule after airing its third episode.

== See also ==
- Cops (TV program)

== Additional reading ==
- Langan, Angela (March 2007). "The Code: Crime and Justice". Reviews. Alternative Law Journal. 32 (1): 57–58 – via HeinOnline.
