= Jean Conochie =

Australian Librarian

Jean Conochie MBE
- Born: 25 February 1925; Merredin, Western Australia
- Died: 18 June 2017 (aged 92); Melbourne, Victoria, Australia
- Resting place: Fawkner, Moreland City, Victoria, Australia
- Education: University of Western Australia; Monash University

Jean Conochie MBE (25 February 1925 – 18 June 2017) was also known as Jean Athola Conochie. She was honoured by The Library Association of Australia with the H.C.L. Anderson Award in 1985 for outstanding service to librarianship in Australia.

== Biography ==
Conochie was born in Merredin, Western Australia, 25 February 1925 and died Melbourne, Victoria, 18 June 2017 in Australia. She was the youngest child out of six children. Conochie spoke French, German, Italian, and studied Russian and Indonesian. She was never married, although she later developed a close relationship with Dr Peter Russo, who was a journalist and academic. He died in 1985 of cancer. She read for the Royal Victorian Institute for the Blind, which is currently known as Vision Australia.

=== Education ===
During Conochie's childhood, her family moved to Perth and she won a scholarship to the Perth Modern School. She also studied science at the University of Western Australia.

After her retirement, Conochie continued her studies and obtained a Bachelor of Arts in European history at Monash University.

=== Career ===
Conochie took up her appointment in 1946 and had a successful career in librarianship at the Council for Scientific and Industrial Research (CSIR), which was later renamed as the Commonwealth Scientific and Industrial Research Organisation (CSIRO). She worked in CSIRO all her working life, which made her earn an international reputation as a serials cataloguer and bibliographer.

She was responsible for cataloguing standards for the CSIRO library network, and for the ongoing compilation of the CSIRO union catalogue. She was an active member of the Library Association of Australia, she represented the Association at overseas conferences and in 1967, was accorded the Fellow of the Association. Conochie became a member of the Board of Examiners from 1966 to 1972.

Conochie was an active member of the Australian Advisory Committee on Bibliographical Services (AACOBS) and a member of its Working Party on Bibliography from 1974 to 1983. She was a member of the judging panel for selecting award-winning indexes and indexers.

Conochie retired and was recognised by CSIRO because of her achievements.

== Accolades ==
In 1985, she was honoured by the Library Association of Australia with the H.C.L. Anderson Award for outstanding service to librarianship in Australia.

On 31 December 1977, she was appointed Member of the Order of the British Empire for public service in the field of science.
