= Ian Gray (Australian magistrate) =

Australian judge

The Honourable Ian Gray AM

Chief Magistrate of Victoria
- In office March 2001 – 29 November 2012

State Coroner of Victoria
- In office 29 November 2012 – December 2015
- Appointed by: Governor of Victoria
- Preceded by: Jennifer Coate
- Succeeded by: Sara Hinchey

Judge of the County Court of Victoria
- In office 29 November 2012 – 2016

Chair, Victorian Post Sentence Authority
- In office February 2018 – 29 March 2019
- Preceded by: new title
- Succeeded by: Michele Williams

Personal details
- Born: Ian Leslie Gray; 1950 (age 75–76)
- Education: Monash University
- Occupation: Judge; Solicitor

Ian Leslie Gray AM (born 1950), an Australian jurist, is a retired lawyer, former judge, Chief Magistrate, and State Coroner of Victoria. (Note: Not to be confused with Ian "Sam" Gray, a former Judge of the Supreme Court of Victoria (from 1977–1990); and an acting Judge of the Supreme Court of the Northern Territory in 1991, 1994, 1995 and 1998.)

== Biography ==
Gray graduated with a Bachelor of Arts and a Bachelor of Laws at Monash University in 1973.

He initially practised as a solicitor, before beginning working in a community legal service and at the Victorian Aboriginal Legal Service. In 1982, he was admitted to the Victorian Bar and practiced as a barrister, specialising in criminal law.

In 1987, Gray was appointed as the principal legal advisor for the Northern Land Council, located in Darwin; and in 1990 Gray was appointed a magistrate in the Northern Territory. By 1992, he was Chief Magistrate of the Northern Territory. In that role he took issue with a government policy of mandatory sentencing for property offences and, as a coroner, dealt with the first case of a euthanasia under the Rights of the Terminally Ill Act, 1995 (Northern Territory). From 1995 to 1997, Gray served on the national Council for Aboriginal Reconciliation as a representative of the Northern Territory.

In 1998, Gray returned to the Victorian Bar, specialising in criminal, administrative and employment law. In 2000, he was appointed as head of the Land and Property Unit of the United Nations Transitional Administration in East Timor (UNTAET). This role involved leading an international team working on the development of a modern land law system, and rules for resolving land disputes, in the post-conflict nation. He has since maintained a close connection with Timor Leste.

=== Chief Magistrate of Victoria ===
In March 2001, Gray was appointed Chief Magistrate of Victoria, where he led over 100 magistrates, covering 52 locations across the state. Among Gray's initiatives was opening the Court to live filming of case hearings for a national TV series titled The Code: Crime and Justice in 2007. During Gray's time in office, a number of major reforms were made at the Magistrates' Court. The establishment of innovative new specialist courts, such as the Drug Court, the Family Violence Court and the Koori Court, are a few examples of the type of change which Gray oversaw. On 29 November 2012, he was appointed a judge of the County Court of Victoria and commenced his appointment as State Coroner.

=== State Coroner ===
In November 2012, Gray was appointed to the County Court and served as the State Coroner of Victoria, succeeding Judge Jennifer Coate. As State Coroner he conducted a number of high-profile investigations including the inquests into the deaths of Luke Batty, Sargun Ragi, and Jill Meagher. His recommendations in the Batty case were supported in 2016 in the findings of Australia's first royal commission into family violence. Gray retired as Coroner and as a judge of the County Court at the end of 2015.

=== Other work ===
Gray was one of the founding board members of the Judicial College of Victoria, established in 2002. From 2013 to 2015 Gray chaired the advisory board at the RMIT University for their Juris Doctor program; and he has been an adjunct professor at the College of Law and Justice of the Victoria University since 2015. Between February 2018 and March 2019, Gray served as the inaugural chair of the Victorian Post Sentence Authority, established after a spate of parolee murders in Melbourne to monitor the post-release compliance by serious offenders with supervision orders made by Courts.

== Honours ==
In June 2021, Gray was appointed a Member of the Order of Australia (AM) for “significant service to the law, and to indigenous justice”.

== Notes ==
Court offices
Preceded by Jennifer Coate	State Coroner of Victoria; 2013–2015	Succeeded by Sara Hinchey
