= List of acts of the Legislative Council of Victoria from 1855 =

This is a list of acts of the Legislative Council of Victoria, Australia for the year 1855.

== 1855 ==
Short title, or popular name	Citation	Royal assent
Long title
	18 Vict. No. 16	31 January 1855
An Act to re-enact three Acts passed in the ninth (Note: 9 Vict. No. 27 (NSW)) eleventh (Note: 11 Vict. No. 9 (NSW)) and sixteenth (Note: 16 Vict. No. 6) years of the reign of Her present Majesty respecting the law between Masters and Servants. (Repealed by Masters and Servants Statute 1864 (27 Vict. No. 198))
	18 Vict. No. 17	31 January 1855
An Act to continue an Act intituled "An Act to make provision for the sale of Fermented and Spirituous Liquors and of refreshments in certain districts." (Note: 16 Vict. No. 35) (Repealed by Wines Beer and Spirit Sale Statute 1864 (27 Vict. No. 227))
	18 Vict. No. 18	13 February 1855
An Act to amend an Act intituled "An Act to provide for the establishment of Public Abattoirs in the City of Melbourne and for preventing certain nuisances therein." (Note: 14 Vict. No. 17 (NSW)) (Repealed by Licensed Butchers and Abattoirs Statute 1864 (27 Vict. No. 199))
	18 Vict. No. 19	23 February 1855
An Act for adopting a certain Act of Parliament (Note: Wills Act Amendment Act 1852 (15 & 16 Vict. c. 24 (Imp))) intituled "An Act for the amendment of an Act passed in the first year of the reign of Her Majesty Queen Victoria (Note: Wills Act 1837 (7 Will. 4 & 1 Vict. c. 26 (Imp))) intituled 'An Act for the amendment of the laws with respect to Wills.'" (Repealed by Wills Statute 1864 (27 Vict. No. 222))
	18 Vict. No. 20	9 March 1855
An Act to facilitate proceedings by and against Incorporated Companies. (Repealed by Instruments and Securities Statute 1864 (27 Vict. No. 204))
Melbourne Improvement Act 1855	18 Vict. No. 21	9 March 1855
An Act to amend an Act intituled "An Act to enable the Mayor Aldermen Councillors and Citizens of the City of Melbourne to raise a sum or sums of Money not exceeding Five hundred thousand pounds (Note: £500,000 in 1854 is equivalent to A$45,600,000 in 2022.) in the whole and for further amending the Acts relating to the Corporation thereof." (Note: 17 Vict. No. 13)
Geelong Improvement Act 1855	18 Vict. No. 22	9 March 1855
An Act to amend an Act intituled "An Act to enable the Mayor Aldermen Councillors and Burgesses of the Town of Geelong to raise a sum or sums of Money not exceeding Two hundred thousand pounds (Note: £200,000 in 1854 is equivalent to A$45,600,000 in 2022.) in the whole and for the further amending the Acts relating to the Corporation thereof." (Note: 17 Vict. No. 23)
	18 Vict. No. 23	22 March 1855
An Act for the better regulation of Sales by Auction and Auctioneers. (Repealed by Sales by Auction Statute 1864 (27 Vict. No. 203))
	18 Vict. No. 24	22 March 1855
An Act for facilitating the transfer of various Instruments and Securities. (Repealed by 21 Vict. No. 5)
	18 Vict. No. 25	22 March 1855
An Act to facilitate the delivery of Passengers' Luggage and Tools of Trade from ships arriving in the Colony of Victoria from the United Kingdom or Foreign Ports. (Repealed by Passengers Harbors and Navigation Statute 1865 (28 Vict. No. 255))
Water Works Loan Act 1855 (repealed)	18 Vict. No. 26	13 April 1855
An Act to authorise the raising a sum of money for certain Public Works. (Repealed by 18 Vict. No. 40)
	18 Vict. No. 27	20 April 1855
An Act for granting duties of Customs upon Gold exported from Victoria. (Repealed by 29 Vict. No. 293)
	18 Vict. No. 28	27 April 1855
An Act to provide for the prevention of disturbances of the public Peace in Victoria. (Repealed by Unlawful Assemblies and Party Processions Statute 1865 (28 Vict. No. 247))
	18 Vict. No. 29	27 April 1855
An Act to further amend an Act intituled "An Act for the general regulation of the Customs in the Colony of Victoria." (Note: 16 Vict. No. 23) (Repealed by 21 Vict. No. 13)
	18 Vict. No. 30	15 May 1855
An Act to amend the Law relating to the Impounding of Cattle. (Repealed by Pounds Statute 1865 (28 Vict. No. 249))
	18 Vict. No. 31	15 May 1855
An Act to amend an Act intituled "An Act to amend the Law relating to the Post Office." (Note: 17 Vict. No. 30) (Repealed by Post Office Statute 1864 (27 Vict. No. 226))
	18 Vict. No. 32	
An Act to amend an Act intituled "An Act for the establishment of Municipal Institutions in Victoria." (Note: 18 Vict. No. 15) (Repealed by Municipal Corporations Act 1863 (27 Vict. No. 184))
	18 Vict. No. 33	22 May 1855
An Act to further continue an Act intituled "An Act to make provision for the sale of Fermented and Spirituous Liquors and of Refreshments in certain districts." (Note: 16 Vict. No. 35) (Repealed by Wines Beer and Spirit Sale Statute 1864 (27 Vict. No. 227))
	18 Vict. No. 34	22 May 1855
An Act to further alter "The Victoria Electoral Act of 1851" (Note: Victoria Electoral Act 1851 (14 Vict. No. 47 (NSW))) and to increase the Number of Members of the Legislative Council of Victoria. (Repealed by 19 Vict. No. 12)
	18 Vict. No. 35	31 May 1855
An Act for applying certain Sums arising from the Revenue receivable in the Colony of Victoria to the Service thereof, for the year One thousand eight hundred and fifty-five, and for further appropriating the said Revenue.
	18 Vict. No. 36	1 June 1855
An Act to prevent the further Pollution of the Waters of the River Yarra Yarra above the City of Melbourne. (Repealed by Public Health Statute 1865 (28 Vict. No. 264))
	18 Vict. No. 37	12 June 1855
An Act to amend the Laws relating to the Gold Fields. (Repealed by 21 Vict. No. 32)
	18 Vict. No. 38	12 June 1855
An Act for preventing the extension of the disease called Scab in Sheep. (Repealed by 25 Vict. No. 143)
	18 Vict. No. 39	12 June 1855
An Act to make provision for certain Immigrants. (Repealed by 22 Vict. No. 80)
Water Works Debenture Act 1855 (repealed)	18 Vict. No. 40	12 June 1855
An Act to authorise the raising moneys for certain Public Works. (Repealed by Public Works Statute 1865 (29 Vict. No. 289))
Friendly Societies Act 1855 (repealed)	18 Vict. No. 41	12 June 1855
An Act to consolidate and amend the Laws relating to Friendly Societies. (Repealed by Friendly Societies Statute 1865 (28 Vict. No. 254))
	18 Vict. No. 42	12 June 1855
An Act for the better regulation of Mining Companies. (Repealed by Companies Statute 1864 (27 Vict. No. 190))
	18 Vict. No. 43	1 May 1855 (Note: This act was reserved for approval by Her Majesty.)
An Act to alter the sum appropriated to the payment of the Salary of the Governor of Victoria. (Repealed by 27 Vict. No. 189)
	18 Vict. No. 44	6 June 1855
An Act to regulate the Execution of Criminals. (Repealed by Criminal Law and Practice Statute 1864 (27 Vict. No. 233))
Church of England Act 1854 (Note: Although originally passed on 30 November 1854, the need to obtain approval from the United Kingdom delayed proclamation until 1855.)	18 Vict. No. 45	6 June 1855
An Act to enable the Bishops Clergy and Laity of the United Church of England and Ireland in Victoria to provide for the regulation of the affairs of the said Church.
Church of England Belfast Lands Act 1855 or the Belfast Church Lands Act 1855	18 Vict.	26 March 1855
An Act to enable the Trustees for the time being of certain portions of the Belfast Church of England Lands in the Colony of Victoria to sell certain portions of the said lands.
Melbourne Exchange Company's Act 1855	18 Vict.	15 May 1855
An Act for the Incorporation of a Company called "The Melbourne Exchange Company."
	18 Vict.	15 May 1855
An Act to Incorporate the Proprietors of a certain Company called "The South Yarra Water Works Company" and for other purposes therein mentioned. (Repealed by Public Works Statute 1865 (29 Vict. No. 289))
City of Melbourne Gas and Coke Company's Act 1855	18 Vict.	22 May 1855
An Act to enable the City of Melbourne Gas and Coke Company to raise a Sum or Sums of Money not exceeding Fifty Thousand Pounds in the whole and for vesting certain real Estates in the Trustees for the said Company and for the other purposes herein mentioned.
	18 Vict.	12 June 1855
An Act to alter and amend an Act passed in the sixteenth year of the reign of Her Majesty Queen Victoria intituled "An Act to Incorporate a Company to be called The Geelong and Melbourne Railway Company." (Note: 16 Vict.) (Repealed by Public Works Statute 1865 (29 Vict. No. 289))
Bank of New South Wales Act 1855 (repealed)	18 Vict.	12 June 1855
An Act to amend the Acts relating to the Bank of New South Wales. (Repealed by Bank of New South Wales Act 1926 (17 Geo. V. No. 3453))
Constitution Act 1855 (repealed)	19 Vict.	23 November 1855
An Act to establish a Constitution in and for the Colony of Victoria. (Repealed by Constitution Act 1975 (No. 8750))
	19 Vict. No. 1	17 December 1855
An Act to further continue an Act intituled "An Act to prevent for a limited time Party Processions and certain other Public Exhibitions in the Colony of New South Wales." (Note: 10 Vict. No. 1 (NSW)) (Repealed by Unlawful Assemblies and Party Processions Statute 1865 (28 Vict. No. 247))

== Sources ==
- "1855 Victorian Historical Acts". AustLII.
