= Fire 000 =

- Genre: Observational Documentary
- Starring: Greg CRASH Mantle
- Country of origin: Australia
- Original language: English
- No. of seasons: 1

Production
- Executive producer: Craig Graham

Original release
- Network: Nine Network
- Release: 7 May 2008 – present

Fire 000 is an Australian observational documentary series that was airing on the Nine Network in 2008.

Fire 000 follows the fire officer operations of the New South Wales Fire Brigade.
