= Graeme Johnstone =

Australian lawyer

Justice Graeme Johnstone

State Coroner of Victoria
- In office August 1994 – 29 November 2007
- Appointed by: Governor of Victoria
- Preceded by: Hal Hallenstein
- Succeeded by: Jennifer Coate

Personal details
- Born: Graeme Douglas Johnstone; 17 May 1945
- Died: 16 November 2012 (aged 67)
- Spouses: Carol Johnstone; Shirley Johnstone ( –2012)
- Children: 3
- Education: Geelong College
- Alma mater: Monash University
- Occupation: Judge and coroner
- Notable inquests: Disappearance of Harold Holt; Murder of Jaidyn Leskie; Disappearance of Louise and Charmian Faulkner

Graeme Douglas Johnstone (17 May 1945 – 16 November 2012) an Australian judge, was the State Coroner of Victoria from August 1994 to 29 November 2007. He was noted for often personally visiting the scenes of deaths that fell within his jurisdiction.

== Early life and education ==
Johnstone was born on 17 May 1945. He was educated at Geelong College and Monash University, where he graduated with a Bachelor of Laws and a Bachelor of Jurisprudence.

== Career ==
Johnstone held inquests into many famous deaths. In 2005, he conducted a coronial inquest into the death of Prime Minister Harold Holt and found that he had accidentally drowned near Cheviot Beach in Victoria. This disappointed advocates of conspiracy theories, such as the hypothesis that he was kidnapped by a Chinese submarine.

He also presided over a long-running series of inquests into the murder of Jaidyn Leskie. Upon his retirement, Victorian Attorney-General Rob Hulls praised Johnstone for his outstanding commitment to investigating deaths in custody. In February 2008, Johnstone came out of retirement for the conclusion of the inquest into the disappearance and death of Louise and Charmian Faulkner who went missing in 1980.

Johnstone was replaced by and was Judge Jennifer Coate. He died on 16 November 2012, at the age of 67, survived by his three stepchildren and his first wife. His second wife died a few months earlier.

Court offices
Preceded by Hal Hallenstein	State Coroner of Victoria; 1994–2007	Succeeded by Jennifer Coate
