= The Embassy (TV series) =

Australian factual television series

- Genre: Factual
- Narrated by: Les Hill
- Country of origin: Australia
- Original language: English
- No. of seasons: 3
- No. of episodes: 20

Production
- Producers: Laurie Critchley; Craig Graham
- Production location: Various
- Running time: Seasons 1 & 2 - 60 minutes (Including commercials) Season 3 - 30 minutes (Including commercials)
- Production companies: Fredbird Entertainment; Southern Pictures

Original release
- Network: Nine Network
- Release: 19 October 2014 – 2018

The Embassy is an Australian factual television series narrated by Australia actor Les Hill. The series first began airing on the Nine Network on 19 October 2014. The series was renewed for a second season which began screening from 3 February 2016. The series was renewed for a third season on 1 March 2016.

The series is based in Australia's busiest embassies and features unprecedented access as staff deal with Australians requiring diplomatic assistance.

== Series overview ==
Series	Episodes	Originally released	
Series	Episodes	First released	Last released
1	4	19 October 2014	9 November 2014
2	8	3 February 2016	8 December 2017
3	8	22 December 2017	12 January 2018

== Episodes ==
=== Season 1 (2014) ===
The first season presented the workings behind the Australian embassy in Bangkok.

No.	Title	Original release date	Australian viewers
1	"Episode 1"	19 October 2014	0.855
2	"Episode 2"	26 October 2014	0.910
3	"Episode 3"	2 November 2014	0.864
4	"Episode 4"	9 November 2014	0.656

=== Season 2 (2016-17) ===
The second season featured the Australian embassy in Bangkok again, as well as those in Ho Chi Minh City and Vientiane, Laos.

No.	Title	Original release date	Australian viewers
1	"Episode 1"	3 February 2016	0.439
2	"Episode 2"	10 February 2016	0.514
3	"Episode 3"	17 February 2016	0.372
4	"Episode 4"	9 March 2016	0.423
5	"Episode 5"	16 March 2016	0.450
6	"Episode 6"	24 November 2017	N/A
7	"Episode 7"	1 December 2017	0.347
8	"Episode 8"	8 December 2017	0.371

=== Season 3 (2017) ===
The third season continued to present the Australian embassy in Bangkok, while introducing those in Bali, Paris, and Madrid.

No.	Title	Original release date	Australian viewers
1	"Episode 1"	22 December 2017	0.365
2	"Episode 2"	22 December 2017	0.365
3	"Episode 3"	29 December 2017	0.400
4	"Episode 4"	29 December 2017	0.400
5	"Episode 5"	5 January 2018	0.443
6	"Episode 6"	5 January 2018	0.446
7	"Episode 7"	12 January 2018	0.414
8	"Episode 8"	12 January 2018	0.399
