= Jennifer Coate =

Australian judge

The Honourable Jennifer Coate AO
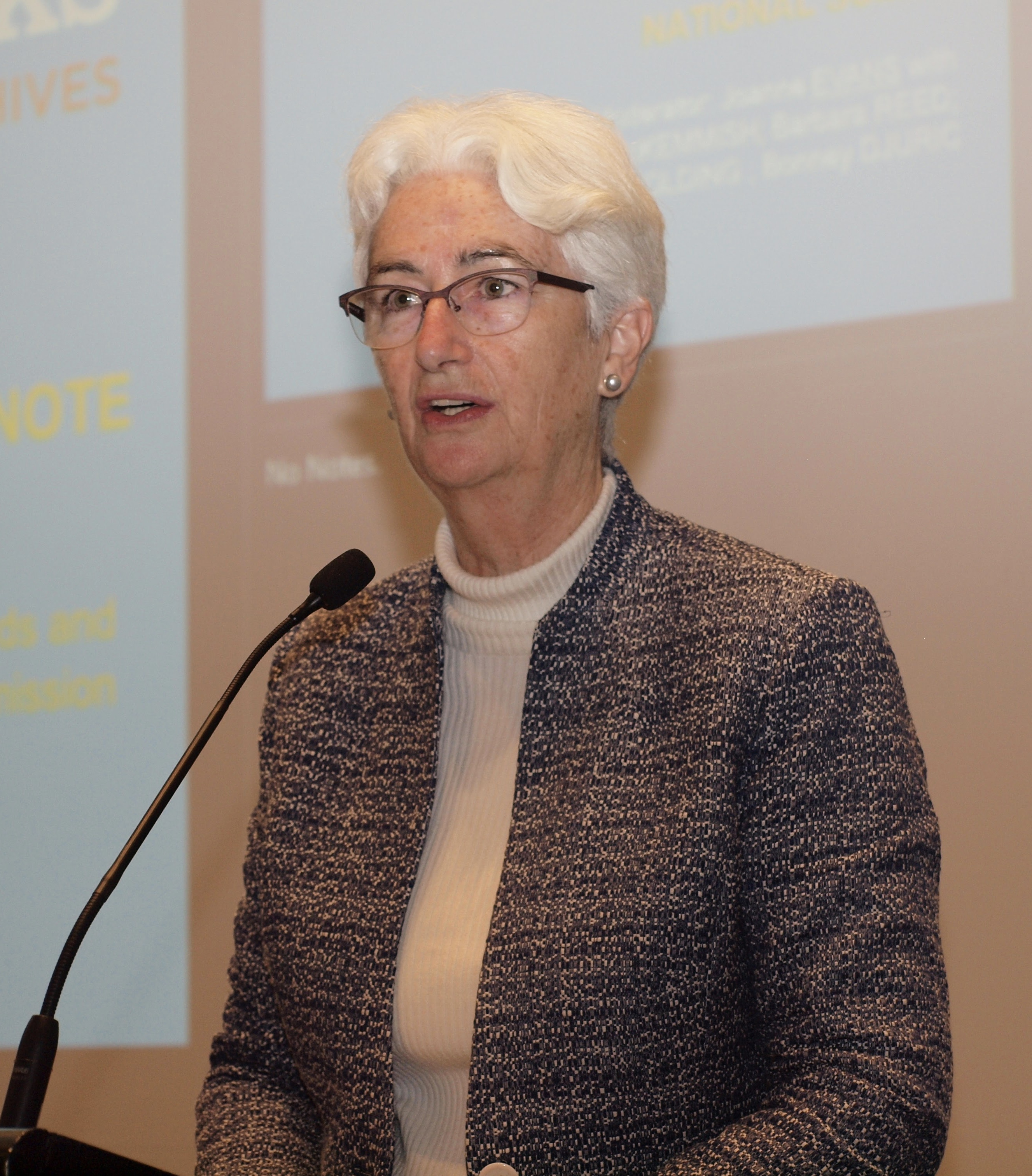
- Coate in 2016

Royal Commissioner of the Royal Commission into Institutional Responses to Child Sexual Abuse
- In office 11 January 2013 – 15 December 2017 Serving with: Bob Atkinson; Robert Fitzgerald; Helen Milroy; Andrew Murray; Peter McClellan
- Nominated by: Julia Gillard (Prime Minister of Australia)
- Appointed by: Quentin Bryce (Governor-General of Australia)

Judge of the Family Court of Australia
- In office 31 January 2013 – 8 February 2019

State Coroner of Victoria
- In office 29 November 2007 – 30 January 2013
- Nominated by: Rob Hulls
- Appointed by: Governor of Victoria
- Preceded by: Graeme Johnstone
- Succeeded by: Ian Gray

Judge of the County Court of Victoria
- In office June 2000 – 30 January 2013

President of the Children's Court of Victoria
- In office June 2000 – 28 November 2007

Personal details
- Born: 8 February 1953 (age 73) East Melbourne, Victoria, Australia
- Education: Monash University
- Occupation: Judge
- Profession: Solicitor; barrister; academic

Jennifer Ann Coate AO (born 8 February 1953) is an Australian jurist. Coate was a Judge of the Family Court of Australia and one of the six Royal Commissioners appointed by the Australian government Royal Commission into Institutional Responses to Child Sexual Abuse.

== Early life ==
Coate studied law at Monash University. She graduated with a Bachelor of Arts in 1979, and a Bachelor of Laws in 1984. Coate worked part-time as a teacher while she studied law.

== Career ==
Upon graduating, Coate worked as a solicitor and then a barrister. She also served as an academic, and contributed to a range of social policy groups and committees.

In 1992, Coate was appointed a magistrate. By September 1996, she was Deputy Chief Magistrate of Victoria. In June 2000, she was made a judge of the County Court of Victoria, and was made the first female President of the Children's Court of Victoria. One of the most significant reforms she oversaw as President of the Children's Court was the establishment of a Children's Koori Court, a specialist court designed to accommodate juvenile Indigenous offenders. In 2001, Coate was made part-time Commissioner of the Victorian Law Reform Commission. Coate left the Children's Court in April 2006.

On 29 November 2007, she formally took up responsibilities as State Coroner of Victoria, marking the first time a woman had taken on the role; and served in that role until her appointment to the Family Court. Until 2006, she served as the first female President of the Children's Court of Victoria.

Additionally, Coate has been involved in a wide range of charitable and community organisations. She has served as Chair of the Health Services for Abused Victorian Children Advisory Group and Chair of the Anglicare Steering Committee for Group Conferencing Restorative Justice.

On 11 January 2013, Coate was named as one of the six Royal Commissioners appointed to investigate child sexual abuse by the Australian government Royal Commission into Institutional Responses to Child Sexual Abuse.

In the 2019 Australia Day Honours Coate was made an Officer of the Order of Australia (AO) for "distinguished service to the law, and to the judiciary, to legal administration, and to child and youth justice". She was inducted onto the Victorian Honour Roll of Women in 2025.

== Personal ==
Coate is reportedly highly respected in legal circles as an extremely bright, thoughtful lawyer, who occasionally acts unconventionally to demonstrate a point. In 1993, when Coate had only recently been appointed a magistrate, a controversy broke out in a Victorian court, when a female solicitor was criticised by a judge for coming to court in polka-dot stockings and a suit with a skirt that finished above the knee. The incident attracted widespread media attention and sparked extensive debate. In a silent protest against her colleague's comments, Coate spent the remainder of the week dressed in outlandishly coloured and patterned stockings, ensuring that she was seen widely and publicly in Melbourne's legal precinct.

Court offices
Preceded by Graeme Johnstone	State Coroner of Victoria; 2007–2013	Succeeded by Ian Gray
