= Craig Graham =

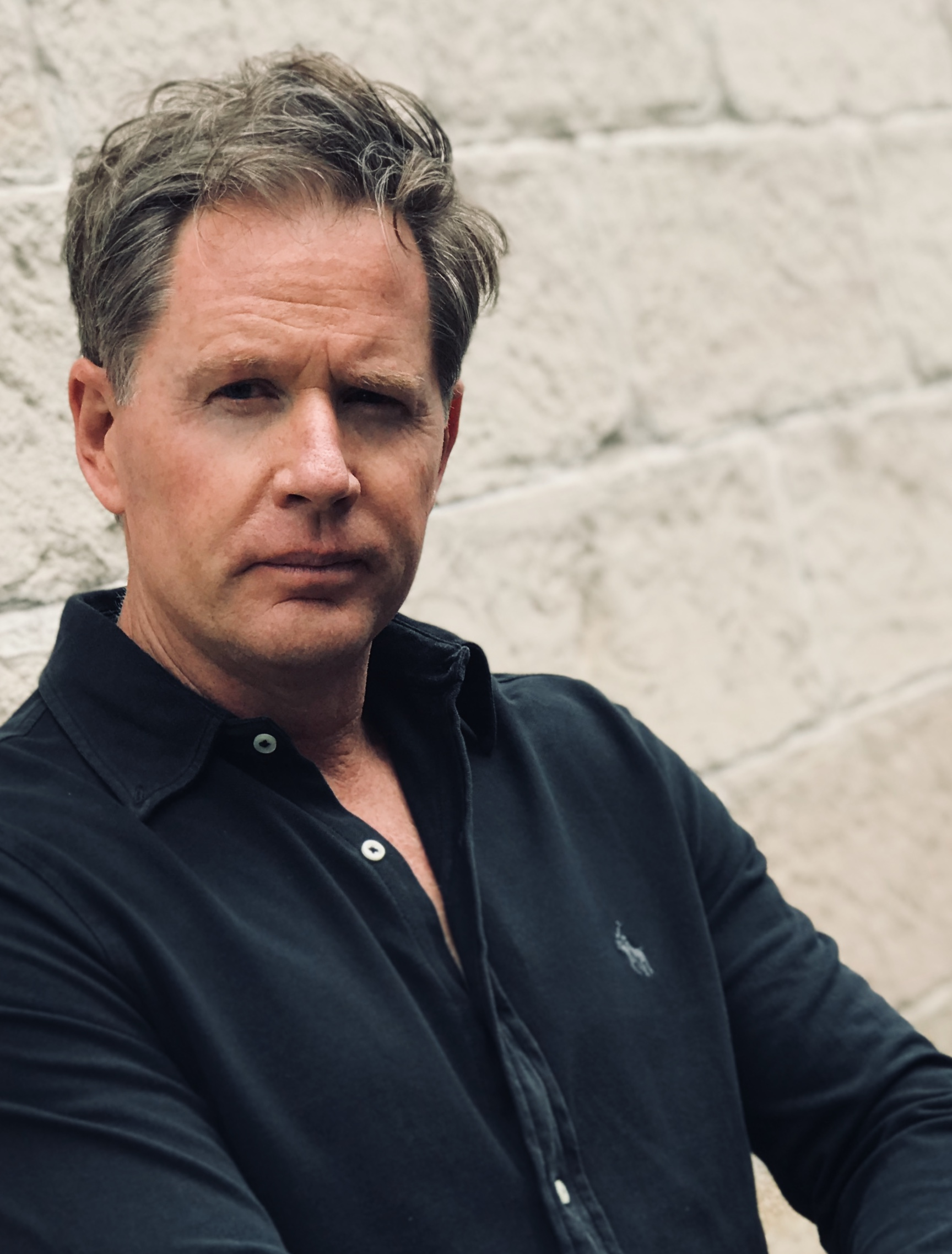
- Craig Graham 2018
- Occupation: Television producer

Craig Graham is an Australian producer of television shows such as "The Embassy", 2014 Channel 9. "Air Rescue", 2013 Channel 7. "Hatch, Match and Dispatch", 2016 ABC. "Moment of Truth", 2016 ABC iView. "Maurice's Big Adventure", 2016 ABC Kids. "The Justine Clarke Show", 2017 ABC Kids. RPA, Once Upon a Time in Cabramatta, The Great Outdoors, Border Security, Zumbo, and Contract Killers.

== Career ==
Graham got his first break in television as a researcher on Money. In 2001, he produced The Great Outdoors (2001–2003) for the Seven Network. It was a presenter-driven lifestyle series about the best places to visit in Australia and overseas.

In 2002, Graham collaborated with Dr Harry Cooper and wrote The Possum Thief, a fictional picture book for young children published by Pan MacMillan Australia. Graham's book led to the trilogy The Adventures of Dr Harry and Scarlet.

In 2004, Graham produced Border Security, watching the drama of people passing through the international customs zones at Sydney and Melbourne airports. He wanted to highlight the experience of asylum-seekers or refugees but, after nine months of filming, no suitable story arose.

Over the ensuing five years, Graham produced shows, including The Code: Crime and Justice, Fire 000, Customs with Vince Colosimo and RPA.

In 2009, the Special Broadcasting Service (SBS) commissioned Fredbird Entertainment, Graham's independent production company, to produce Zumbo, an Australian observational documentary series about master patissier Adriano Zumbo.

Fredbird Entertainment and Northern Pictures co-produced Once Upon a Time in Cabramatta for SBS. The first episode attracted 620,000 viewers. Graham produced the mini-series, broadcast in January 2012, which described the turbulent story of a multicultural Sydney suburb. The Age described Graham as a "gifted storyteller" whose treatment of the subject was "pitch-perfect, the ideal blend of exposition and witness accounts". In October 2012 Once Upon A Time in Cabramatta was nominated for the 2012 Walkley awards for Excellence in Journalism.

== Filmography ==
Year	Show	Episode	Broadcaster	Role
2017	The Justine Clarke Show	Series	ABC Kids	Executive Producer
2016	Moment of Truth	Series	ABC iView	Co-creator and Executive Producer
2016	Maurice's Big Adventure	Series	ABC Kids	Executive Producer
2014-2016	The Embassy	Series	Channel 9	Creator and Executive Producer
2013-2017	Air Rescue	Series	Channel 7	Creator and Executive Producer
2012	Once Upon a Time in Cabramatta	Series	SBS	Concept and Co-Executive Producer
2011	Contract Killers	Special	Foxtel	Creator and Executive Producer
2010	Zumbo	Series	SBS	Creator and Executive Producer
2009	Customs with Vince Colosimo	Series 1	Channel 9	Executive Producer
2008	Fire 000	Series	Channel 9	Executive Producer
2007	The Code: Crime and Justice	Series	Channel 9	Creator and Executive Producer
2006	In the Line of Fire	Series	Channel 9	Network Executive Producer
2005–2006	RPA	Series 13	Channel 9	Executive Producer
2005	Missing Persons Unit	Series 1	Channel 9	Network Executive Producer
2004	Border Security: Australia's Front Line	Series 1 & 2	Channel 7	Series Producer
2001–2003	The Great Outdoors	Series	Channel 7	Series Producer
2001	Live Auction Special	Special	Channel 7	Supervising Producer
2001	Baby Animals	Special	Channel 7	Supervising Producer
2001	Great Christmas Ideas	Series 1	Channel 7	Series Producer
2000	Great Winter Ideas	Series 1	Channel 7	Series Producer
2000	Great Spring Ideas	Series 1 & 2	Channel 7	Series Producer
2000	Great Summer Ideas	Series 1 & 2	Channel 7	Series Producer

== Publications ==
- 2002 | Graham, Craig | The Possum Thief | Pan Macmillan Australia
- 2004 | Graham, Craig | The Pig Circus | Pan Macmillan Australia
- 2006 | Graham, Craig | The Amazing Adventures of Dr Harry and Scarlet: Fly, Shadow, Fly!
