= Once Upon a Time in Cabramatta =

- DVD cover
- Written by: Jacob Hickey
- Directed by: Bernadine Lim
- Country of origin: Australia
- No. of episodes: 3

Production
- Executive producers: Craig Graham and Sue Clothier
- Producer: Jacob Hickey
- Running time: 60 minutes

Original release
- Network: SBS One
- Release: 8 January – 22 January 2012

Once Upon a Time in Cabramatta is a three-part Australian documentary television series. It began screening on SBS One on 8 January 2012. It was also simulcast on SBS Two with Vietnamese subtitles.

The mini-series tells the turbulent story of Cabramatta, a suburb of southwest Sydney, whose ethnic blend eventually changed Australia's attitude to multiculturalism. The White Australia is over as Malcolm Fraser opens the gates for the immigrants seeking asylum. It includes interviews of families who immigrated from Vietnam post war and were forced to adapt to Australia. We hear their story of racism among and the formation of Vietnamese gangs from children without parents. The series was released on DVD on 4 April 2012.

The first episode attracted 626,000 viewers, coming in 9th for the night and 2nd in its timeslot.
