= Bar table =

Table in a common law courtroom

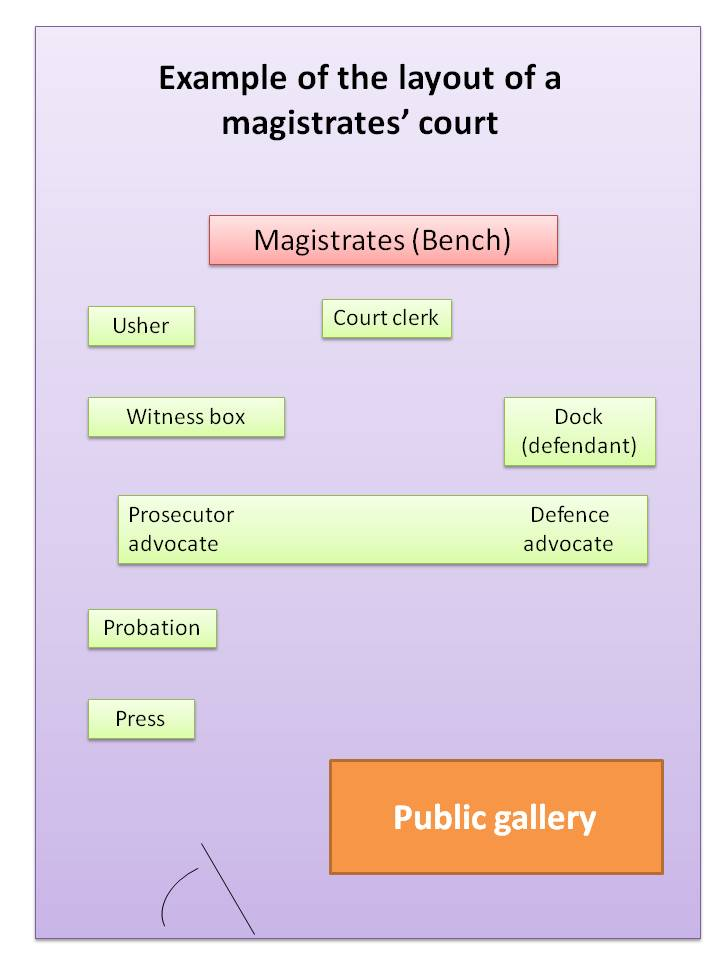
Advocates at the bar table (layout of a typical magistrates' court in England)

A bar table is a table in a common law courtroom at which advocates sit or stand. It is generally situated between the Bench and the well of the court, where the public sit. Advocates such as barristers sit facing the Bench with their backs to the well. Usually the witness box and, if there is one, the jury box, will be to the sides of the room, between the bar table and the bench.

In some jurisdictions, solicitors sit on a table behind the bar table. In others, they sit at the bar table facing the barristers and with their backs to the judge.
