= Victorian Civil and Administrative Tribunal =

Quasi-judicial body in Victoria, Australia

The Victorian Civil and Administrative Tribunal (VCAT, pronounced ‘vee-cat’) was formed by the Victorian Civil and Administrative Tribunal Act 1998 in the state of Victoria, Australia. As part of the Victorian Justice system the tribunal sits 'below' the Magistrates Court in the court hierarchy. However the tribunal itself is not a court, not possessing any jurisdiction or powers beyond those conferred by statute. VCAT is less formal than a court and helps resolve disputes through mediations, compulsory conferences and formal hearings. The participation of lawyers or other legal representatives is not encouraged in some list areas, substantially reducing the cost of litigation. However some of the list areas will by necessity require parties to have some form of representation.

VCAT resolves about 70,000 disputes per year and provides Victorians with a low-cost, accessible and independent dispute resolution service, which is deliberately informal and encourages self-representation. Its orders are enforceable by law once they have been registered with the Magistrates Court. VCAT began operating on 1 July 1998, amalgamating 15 smaller boards and tribunals, creating a 'one-stop-shop' for handling a broad range of disputes. When looking at the sheer number of cases, VCAT deals with the overwhelming majority of legal proceedings in Victoria.

The VCAT President (currently Edward Woodward), is a Supreme Court Judge, and County Court Judges serve as vice presidents. Applications are heard and determined by deputy presidents (appointed full-time), as well as senior members and ordinary members, who may be appointed on a full-time, part-time or on a sessional basis. Members have a broad range of specialist skills and qualifications, enabling VCAT to hear and determine cases of considerable complexity and varying subject matter. VCAT has jurisdiction to hear and determine disputes under over 200 enabling provisions.

== Structure of VCAT ==
VCAT has five divisions, each broken down into specific sections called 'lists', which hear and decide specific types of cases. This classification of disputes allows for efficient allocation of members to lists with matters they are experienced and qualified in.

=== Division Structure ===
==== Administrative ====
- Legal Practice List
- Review and Regulation List

==== Civil ====
- Civil Claims List
- Owners Corporations List
- Building and Property List

==== Human Rights ====
- Human Rights List
- Guardianship List

==== Planning and Environment ====
- Planning and Environment List
- Land Valuation List

==== Residential Tenancies ====
- Residential Tenancies List

=== Matters for each Division ===
The Civil Division hears and determines a range of civil disputes relating to:

- consumer matters
- domestic building works
- owners corporation matters
- retail tenancies
- sale and ownership of property
- use or flow of water between properties

The Administrative Division deals with applications from people seeking a review of government and other bodies' decisions that affect them. These include decisions relating to:

- Transport Accident Commission decisions
- state taxation
- legal services
- business licenses and professional registrations
- freedom of Information applications
- WorkSafe assessments
- disciplinary proceedings for a range of professions and industries.

The Residential Tenancies Division deals with matters involving:

- residential tenants and landlords
- rooming house owners and residents
- the Director of Housing and public housing tenants
- caravan park owners and residents

The Human Rights Division deals with matters relating to:

- guardianship and administration
- equal opportunity
- racial and religious vilification
- voluntary assisted dying
- health and privacy information
- the Disability Act 2006 (Vic)
- decisions made by the Mental Health Tribunal

The Planning and Environment Division deals with matters relating to a reviews of decisions of councils and other authorities.

== Procedure ==
VCAT reports to the Attorney General's office each year and these reports are publicly available. According to the 2021-22 VCAT Annual Report, 75,288 applications were lodged, about 60 per cent were residential tenancy matters (45,863 applications received).

Applicants can apply online using VCAT's website (www.vcat.vic.gov.au) or in person at 308 La Trobe Street, Melbourne. Application fees are payable for most matters that are brought to VCAT. Hearing fees are also payable on the day of the hearing in some circumstances.

To resolve disputes without the need for a full hearing, VCAT conducts compulsory conferences, mediations, and hearings on the papers (where members make decisions on cases based solely on lodged documentation, without requiring attendance by the parties).

VCAT's main hearing venue is 308 La Trobe Street, Melbourne. VCAT also has offices in Frankston, Oakleigh, Bundoora, and Wyndham Law Courts as well as Bendigo Law Courts.

VCAT is required to make its decisions in accordance with the law, and can only make a decision based on the specific matter before it. For example, if the application to VCAT is to dispute whether the use of land needs to provide a certain number of car parks, then VCAT cannot make a decision about other matters such as whether the land should be used in the proposed manner (it can only consider the car parking issue).

In planning matters, VCAT must make its decisions based on the law and the requirements of the individual council's planning scheme, balancing competing objectives such as neighborhood character or urban consolidation. The content of a council's planning scheme is determined by the individual council, with the approval of the Minister for Planning. VCAT has no say in what goes into a planning scheme and is not involved with the making of planning laws. It is, however, required to apply them.

VCAT decisions are final. The only exemptions for appeals are when:

- the decision is set aside on appeal by a party to the Supreme Court on questions of law
- the VCAT order contains a mistake and needs to be corrected
- an order for enforcement reasons is varied
- a party did not come to the hearing and the order is set aside (revoked) or changed
