= Children's Court of Victoria =

Specialist Victorian court for children and young people

The Children's Court of Victoria is a statutory court created in Victoria, Australia. The court deals with criminal offences alleged to be committed by children aged between 10 and 17 and with proceedings concerning children under the age of 17 relating to the care and protection of children.

== Colonial times ==
The treatment of juvenile offenders in the colony of Victoria reflected the system of criminal law inherited from England. There was nothing unusual in that as the law of Australia at that time was heavily influenced by the social norms of English society. Children criminals were treated no differently than adult criminals, and there was little distinction in the way penalties were imposed. Children were liable to the same harsh penalties as adults, such as flogging, imprisonment and even death. The Judicial Commission of New South Wales cites an example of one English judge who, after condemning a 10-year-old boy to death, described the boy as “a proper subject for capital punishment”. The commission also noted that on one day in 1815, five children aged between eight and 12 years were hanged for petty larceny in England.

Victoria in the early 1900s was making progress towards a more enlightened method of dealing with juvenile offenders. Some justices of the peace (called magistrates) informally treated children in different ways. One magistrate arranged for children to be flogged in private rather than endure a public one. Civic minded individuals volunteered or were prevailed upon to provide home in the country for wayward children. David McCullum notes that this was seen as a “ready made mechanism for the reform of habit”. Being diverted away from their “evil surroundings” would hopefully change the child's course of life. Other individuals would act as a volunteer and become what court officials are now known as “probation officers” and provide information to magistrates about the child appearing before the court.

== Creation of the court in 1906 ==
The Victorian government established the children's court in 1906 shortly after the creation of a similar court in New South Wales (see, the Children's Court of New South Wales). The Children's Court Act 1906 provided that children's matters were to be dealt with separately from adult matters. The new law also established “probation officers” who were to provide information to the court on a child's habits and conduct. This now formalised the previous voluntary basis of supervisions. However, probation officers continued to be volunteers until around 1916 when paid agents were employed to visit country homes. In 1906, the then children's court dealt with 3,303 young people.

== Present court ==
The present children's court was established in 1989 under section 8 of the Children and Young Persons Act 1989 (Vic). The new court replaced the previous children's court which operated as a division of the Magistrates Court of Victoria. The court was established following a committee report by Professor Terry Carney which made a number of recommendations concerning child welfare in Victoria.

The new court was given the name “The Children's Court of Victoria”, although the word “the” is usually dropped from its title in actual usage. It originally had jurisdiction to hear cases involving young persons up to the age of 17 years. Seventeen-year-olds were dealt with by adult courts. The court at that time was divided into a Criminal Division, handling most crimes committed by young person, and a Family Division, which handled cases involving the care and protection of young persons. In 2000, the court was re-organised. Instead of a senior magistrate heading the court, the head of the court was now to be called the president of the court. The president was to be a county court judge, a middle tier court, rather than a judicial officer from a lower tier court. The court also acquired a Koori Division, a division of the court that could deal with young offenders of an aboriginal background. This initiative was similar to the Koori Court set up in Victoria for adult aboriginal offenders.

The Children and Young Persons Act 1989 (Vic) was replaced by the Children, Youth and Families Act 2005 (Vic). The court established under section 8 of the old law was continued in existence by section 504 of the new Act, and is the same court as that was established in 1989.

== Present structure ==
The court is constituted under section 504 of the Children, Youth and Families Act 2005 (Vic). The court consists of a president, magistrates, and registrars of the court. A court sits with a single judicial officer, either the president or a magistrate. In some cases, a registrar may be entitled to sit as the court for certain procedural matters.

The court is split into four divisions. The Family Division deals with protection and care of any person under the age of 17 years, making intervention orders, determining guardianship (in other words, becoming a ward of the State), and therapeutic treatment orders. Orders may be made where either the “aggrieved family member” or the defendant is under the age of 18 years at the time the application is made.

The Criminal Division deals with criminal offences committed by young person aged 10 years or over, but less than 18 years at the time the crime was committed. The court can continue to hear the case until the person turn 19 years of age. The division can deal with any criminal offence except for crimes of murder, attempted murder, manslaughter, arson which causes death, or the culpable driving of a motor vehicle which causes death. In respect of these offences, the division conducts a committal proceeding to determine whether there is sufficient evidence for the child to stand trial in front of a judge and jury in the County Court of Victoria or Supreme Court of Victoria. In Victoria (as elsewhere in Australia), children aged nine years or younger cannot be charged with criminal offences.

The Koori Court (Criminal Division) deals with criminal offences concerning children from aboriginal backgrounds. When exercising its jurisdiction, it must hear cases with as little formality and technicality as possible. The division may only hear cases where the child is Aboriginal, the offence is not a sexual offence, the child intends to plead guilty to the offence, or has been found guilty of the offence, and the child consents to the proceeding being dealt with by the Koori Court. The court deals with matters on the circle sentencing principles.

The Neighbourhood Justice Division was introduced on 2 January 2007. It deals with criminals by children who are homeless or who are Koori with a ‘close connection’ to the area in which the division is specified to sit. It deals with crimes on a restorative basis.

When the court sits in one of its divisions, it may not deal with cases from another division at the same time.

== Appointment ==
The senior judicial officer of the court is the president. The president is appointed by the Governor of Victoria under section 508 for a term of up to five years. The president may be re-appointed by the governor for further terms of five years at a time. Along with New Zealand and the Australian States of South Australia, Queensland and in Western Australia, the person to be appointed to head the children's court must be a judge of a middle tier court, which in Victoria is the County Court of Victoria.

The governor may also appoint a magistrate to act as the president in the president's absence. If the governor does not appoint an acting president, the Chief Magistrate of Victoria is automatically appointed to act. The first president of the court was Jennifer Coate. The present president is Judge Jack Vandersteen. The president may after consultation with the chief magistrate, assign magistrates as magistrates of the children's court. When assigned, magistrates hold dual appointment as magistrates of the Magistrates Court as well as magistrates of the children's court.

A principal registrar and other registrars may be appointed to the court from time to time. Additionally, the secretary of the Department of Justice may appoint members of the aboriginal community to be “aboriginal elders” to constitute the Koori Court.

== Sittings of the court ==
The court sits permanently in Melbourne on a daily basis. The court also has headquarter courts where the court sits principally. From these headquarter courts, the court will sit in certain towns or suburbs as necessary. The court sits at:

- Melbourne.
- Ballarat (headquarters) and as required at Ararat, Casterton, Edenhope, Hamilton, Hopetoun, Horsham, Maryborough, Nhill, Ouyen, Portland, St. Arnaud, Stawell and Warrnambool.
- Bendigo (headquarters) and as required at Echuca, Kerang, Mildura, Robinvale and Swan Hill.
- Broadmeadows (headquarters) and as required at Castlemaine and Kyneton.
- Dandenong.
- Frankston.
- Geelong (headquarters) and as required at Colac.
- Heidelberg.
- Moe (headquarters) and as required at Bairnsdale, Korumburra, Morwell, Omeo, Orbost, Sale, and Wonthaggi.
- Ringwood.
- Shepparton (headquarters) and as required at Benalla, Cobram, Corryong, Mansfield, Myrtleford, Seymour, Wangaratta, Wodonga.
- Sunshine (headquarters) and as required at Werribee.

== Appeals ==
There may be rights of appeals from certain decisions of the court. If the decision was made by the president, then a right of appeal may lie to the Supreme Court of Victoria. If the decision was made by a magistrate, then an appeal might lie to the County Court of Victoria.

On a question of law, there may be a right of appeal directly to the Supreme Court of Victoria in certain circumstances.

== Controversy ==
The court attracted controversy in 2004 when it made a “divorce” order between a fourteen-year-old child and his mother. The case was actually an “irreconcilable differences” application, a very uncommon application. The case attracted national media attention and led to news crews naming the child and broadcasting footage of the residence and school of the child. This was in contravention of child protection laws which prevent the naming of children the subject of court proceedings. The publication of this information led to the prosecution of a newspaper and a television broadcaster for criminal offences. The saga led to the president of the court writing to the media organisation reminding them of the child protection laws.

== Sources ==
- "Law and Norm: Justice Administration and the Human Sciences in Early Juvenile Justice in Victoria". David McCallum. Newc LR Vol 7 No 2.
- Attorney General of Victoria press release. https://web.archive.org/web/20110519074151/http://www.dpc.vic.gov.au/domino/Web_Notes/newmedia.nsf/b0222c68d27626e2ca256c8c001a3d2d/fb8d9e26fede29e5ca256e4d00770688%21OpenDocument
- Attorney General of Victoria press release. https://web.archive.org/web/20110519074231/http://www.dpc.vic.gov.au/domino/Web_Notes/newmedia.nsf/e741a3eefa539841ca256c8c0016eaac/9f16b77834e28506ca2573510080217c%21OpenDocument
- Law Society of New South Wales. https://web.archive.org/web/20060827201613/http://www.lawsociety.com.au/page.asp?partid=16737&printFriendly=1
- History page of Children's Court of Victoria. https://web.archive.org/web/20071021011140/http://www.childrenscourt.vic.gov.au/CA256CA800011129/page/About%2Bthe%2BCourt-History?OpenDocument&1=10-About+the+Court~&2=50-History~&3=~
- Halisbury Laws of Australia. Lexis Nexis Corporation, Australia.
