= Coroners Court of Victoria =

Specialist Victorian court for the investigation of deaths and related matters

- Established: 1 November 2009
- Jurisdiction: Victoria, Australia: (cause of death of a person; causes of fires)
- Location: Melbourne
- Composition method: Executive selection
- Authorised by: Governor of Victoria
- Type of tribunal: Inquisitorial
- Website: coronerscourt.vic.gov.au

State Coroner
- Currently: Judge Liberty Sanger OAM
- Since: 2025

The Coroners Court of Victoria is an inquisitorial court located in the city of Melbourne, Victoria, Australia. Its role involves the investigation of reportable deaths and fires that have occurred within the state of Victoria for the purpose of promoting public health and safety. "Coroners Court" is the generic name given to the statutory authority that conducts proceedings in which a Coroner holds an inquest in Victoria.

The State Coroner, since September 2025, is Judge Liberty Sanger OAM, who succeeded Judge John Cain.

== Jurisdiction ==
Coroners have jurisdiction over the remains of a person and the power to make findings in respect of the cause of death of a person. When a serious criminal offence has been disclosed during the course of an inquest, the Coroner may adjourn the proceedings until the criminal proceedings are concluded.

Coroners may also hold inquests concerning the cause of any fire in Victoria, unlike their English counterparts.

Generally there are no appeals from the decision of a coroner, although there is provision for the Supreme Court of Victoria to order an inquest or to grant prerogative relief in respect of the proceedings.

The State Coroner may also in some circumstances order the re-opening of an inquest.

== History ==
The office of coroner in Victoria derives from the legal framework inherited from the United Kingdom. The first Governor of New South Wales, Arthur Phillip, was a coroner by virtue of his commission as governor. The governor's commission entitled him to appoint coroners for the Colony of New South Wales, and this was most likely to have been to justices of the peace. Until the District of Port Phillip became the Colony of Victoria and separated from New South Wales in 1851, coroners would have been appointed under the authority of the New South Wales law.

The first coroner of Melbourne and the county of Bourke was Dr William Byam Wilmot MD. He was appointed in 1841 by the then Superintendent of Port Phillip, but later Lieutenant-Governor of the Colony of Victoria, Charles La Trobe. The second city coroner, appointed in 1857, was Dr Richard Youl MD, while the third city coroner, appointed at the death of Youl in 1897, was Mr Samuel Curtis Candler.

Following reviews of coronial services in the 1970s and the proclamation of the Coroners Act 1985 (No. 10257), the State Coroner's Office was established in 1986. The first temporary morgue in Melbourne was erected on the corner of Flinders Street and Swanston Street in 1871, while the first permanent coroner's courthouse was constructed alongside the Yarra River in 1888. The courthouse building was demolished in 1959. The Coroners Court of Victoria, as it is today, was established on 1 November 2009. It is located in the State Coronial Services Centre alongside the Victorian Institute of Forensic Medicine and the Donor Tissue Bank of Victoria.

== Structure and jurisdiction ==
The Governor of Victoria may appoint a State Coroner for Victoria. The State Coroner has the function to oversee and co-ordinate coronial services in Victoria, ensure that all deaths, suspected deaths and fires concerning which a coroner has jurisdiction to hold an inquest are properly investigated, ensuring that an inquest is held whenever it is required, and to issue guidelines to coroners to assist them in the exercise or performance of their functions.

The Governor may also appoint Deputy State Coroners. Deputy State Coroners may exercise any of the functions of the State Coroner delegated by the State Coroner to them. Both must be either a County Court of Victoria judge, a magistrate, or a lawyer.

The Governor may also appoint Coroners. The Governor may also appoint a magistrate as a coroner. Unlike in other Australian states, all magistrates in Victoria do not automatically become coroners by virtue of their appointment as a magistrate.

== State Coroners ==
The following individuals have been appointed to serve as State Coroners, or precedent titles:

Order	Name	Title	Term began	Term ended	Time in office	Notes
M1	Dr William Wilmot	Melbourne City Coroner	1841	1857	15–16 years	
M2	Dr Richard Youl	Melbourne City Coroner	1857	1897	39–40 years	
M3	Dr Samuel Curtis Candler	Melbourne City Coroner	1897	1908	10–11 years	
M4	Dr Robert Hodgson Cole	Melbourne City Coroner	1908	1923	14–15 years	
M5	Daniel Berriman	Melbourne City Coroner	1923	1927	3–4 years	
M6	David Grant	Melbourne City Coroner	1927	1935	7–8 years	
M7	Arthur Tingate	Melbourne City Coroner	1936	1945	8–9 years	
M8	Herbert Wade	Melbourne City Coroner	1947	1947	0 years	
M9	James Burke	Melbourne City Coroner	1947	1955	7–8 years	
(M8)	Herbert Wade	Melbourne City Coroner	1956	1957	0–1 years	
M10	James Duggan	Melbourne City Coroner	1956	1958	1–2 years	
M11	Harry William Pascoe	Melbourne City Coroner	1958	1979	20–21 years	
M12	Kevin Mason	Melbourne City Coroner	1979	1982	2–3 years	
M13	Anthony Ellis	Melbourne City Coroner	1983	1986	2–3 years	
M14	Harold (Hal.) Hallenstein	Melbourne City Coroner	1986	June 1986	7–8 years	
1	Harold (Hal.) Hallenstein	State Coroner of Victoria	June 1986	August 1994	7–8 years	
2	Graeme Johnstone	State Coroner of Victoria	August 1994	29 November 2007	12–13 years	
3	Jennifer Coate	State Coroner of Victoria	29 November 2007	30 October 2012	4 years, 336 days	
4	Ian Gray	State Coroner of Victoria	29 November 2012	16 December 2015	3 years, 17 days	
5	Sara Hinchey	State Coroner of Victoria	17 December 2015	1 December 2019	3 years, 349 days	
6	John Cain	State Coroner of Victoria	2 December 2019	31 August 2025	5 years, 272 days	
7	Liberty Sanger OAM	State Coroner of Victoria	29 September 2025	incumbent	1 year, 38 days	

== See also ==
- List of coroners courts in Australia
