= Constitution of Victoria =

Legislation that constitutes the state of Victoria, Australia

Overview
- Jurisdiction: Victoria
- Date effective: 1 December 1975
- System: parliamentary constitutional monarchy

Government structure
- Branches: Legislative; Executive; Judicial
- Chambers: Legislative Assembly; Legislative Council
- Executive: de jure King of Australia, exercisable through the governor on the advice of the Executive Council; de facto Cabinet of Victoria
- Judiciary: Supreme Court of Victoria and lesser courts

Constitution Act 1975
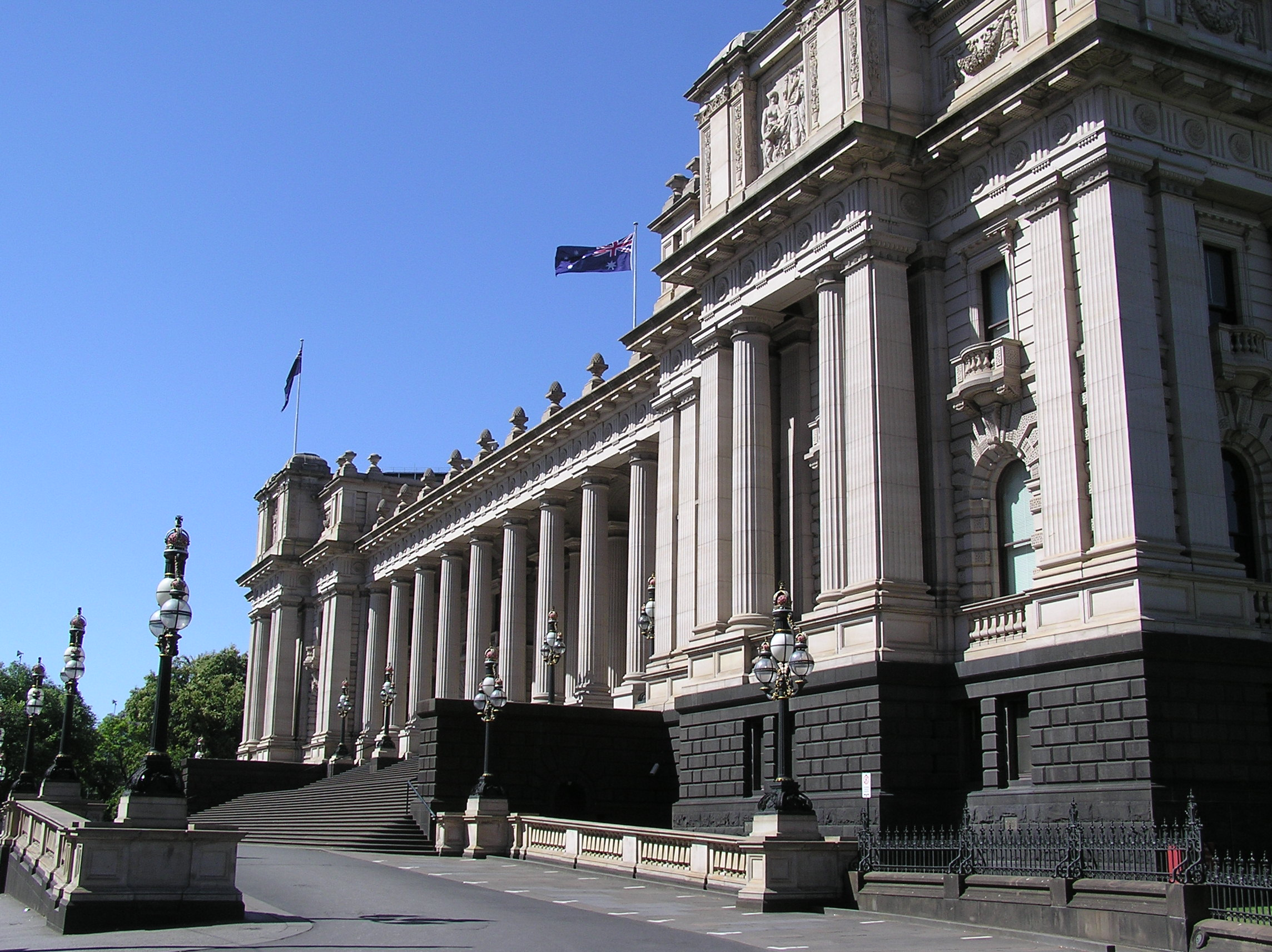

Parliament of Victoria
- Long title: An Act to re-enact the Law relating to the Constitution of the State of Victoria and for other purposes
- Citation: No. 8750 of 1975
- Territorial extent: Victoria
- Passed by: Legislative Assembly
- Passed: 8 May 1975
- Passed by: Legislative Council
- Passed: 8 May 1975
- Royal assent: 22 October 1975
- Commenced: 1 December 1975

Legislative history

Initiating chamber: Legislative Assembly
- Bill title: Constitution Bill
- Introduced by: Vernon Wilcox
- First reading: 9 April 1975
- Second reading: 15 April–1 May 1975
- Committee of the whole: 1 May 1975
- Third reading: 1 May 1975

Revising chamber: Legislative Council
- Bill title: Constitution Bill
- Member(s) in charge: Alan Hunt
- First reading: 1 May 1975
- Second reading: 6–8 May 1975
- Committee of the whole: 8 May 1975
- Third reading: 8 May 1975

Final stages
- Legislative Council amendments considered by the Legislative Assembly: 8 May 1975
- Finally passed both chambers: 8 May 1975

Amends
- The Constitution Act Amendment Act 1958 (No. 6224); Solicitor-General Act 1958 (No. 6374); Supreme Court Act 1958 (No. 6387)

Repeals
- Victorian Constitution Act 1855 (No. 184 of 1855, UK)

Amended by
- 120+ amendments

Keywords
- constitution
- Status: Amended

The Constitution of Victoria is the constitution of the state of Victoria, Australia. The current constitution, the Constitution Act 1975 has been amended over 120 times.

Since 1901, Victoria has been a state of the Commonwealth of Australia, and its relationship with the Commonwealth is regulated by the federal Constitution of Australia. The jurisdiction of the Parliament of Victoria to make laws and the laws of Victoria are subject to limitations imposed by the Australian Constitution.

The Constitution is based on principles of the Westminster system of responsible government, as modified due to Victoria being a state within a federation of Australia.

== History ==
Victoria Constitution Act 1855 (Note: The citation of this act by this short title was authorised by section 1 of, and the first schedule to, the Short Titles Act 1896. Due to the repeal of those provisions it is now authorised by section 19(2) of the Interpretation Act 1978.)
- Act of Parliament
- Parliament of the United Kingdom
- Long title: An Act to enable Her Majesty to assent to a Bill, as amended, of the Legislature of Victoria, to establish a Constitution in and for the Colony of Victoria.
- Citation: 18 & 19 Vict. c. 55
- Territorial extent: United Kingdom

Dates
- Royal assent: 16 July 1855
- Commencement: 16 July 1855 (Note: The Acts of Parliament (Commencement) Act 1793.)

Status: Current legislation

Text of statute as originally enacted

The original Constitution of Victoria was drafted and approved in Melbourne in March 1854 by the first Victorian Legislative Council, and sent to the United Kingdom for assent. It was received in London in May 1854 and, after some opposition and delay, was approved (with some amendments) as an act of the British Parliament in 1855. It was passed by the United Kingdom Parliament as the Victoria Constitution Act 1855 (18 & 19 Vict. c. 55 (Imp)), was granted royal assent on 16 July 1855 and was proclaimed in Victoria on 23 November 1855. The Constitution established the Westminster-style system of responsible government.

The 1855 Constitution, though an act of the British Parliament, could be, and was, amended by the Victorian Parliament from time to time. Changes have included parliamentary membership numbers, voter eligibility, payment of members, voting methods, size of the ministry, electorate numbers and the powers and responsibilities of the Legislative Council and the Legislative Assembly, besides other matters.

In 1901, the Australian colonies, including Victoria, formed the Commonwealth of Australia which was constituted by the Australian Constitution. The jurisdiction of the Victorian Parliament to make laws and the laws of Victoria became subject to limitations imposed by the Australian Constitution.

On 22 October 1975 the Hamer government proclaimed a new constitution as an act of the Parliament of Victoria to replace the 1855 constitution. This was the Constitution Act 1975 (No. 8750).

In 2003, the 1975 Constitution was amended to entrench certain provisions, such as the representation of Victorian voters in Parliament, by requiring amendments to those provisions to require a referendum. The 2003 amendments also provided for fixed-four year terms for both Houses, election of the Legislative Council by proportional representation, removal of the council's power to block a supply bill (the budget) and a dispute resolution process for bills for which agreement between the houses cannot be reached. The Bracks labor government also passed a bill to entrench public ownership of water authorities in the Victorian constitution.

In 2021, Victoria under the Andrews goverment put a fracking ban in the Victorian Constitution.

During the 2022 Victorian state election Labor Premier Daniel Andrews committed to amending the state's constitution to protect public ownership of the revived State Electricity Commission if re-elected, to make it harder, although not impossible, for it to be privatised again in the future. Re-privatising the commission after such legislation would require a "special majority" of 60% of both the Legislative Assembly and Legislative Council, a situation which already exists for any potential privatisation of water services in Victoria under the Constitution of Victoria. These amendments passed in 2024.
