= County Court of Victoria =

Principal trial court of Victoria, Australia

- Emblem of the County Court (left), Coat of Arms of Victoria (right)

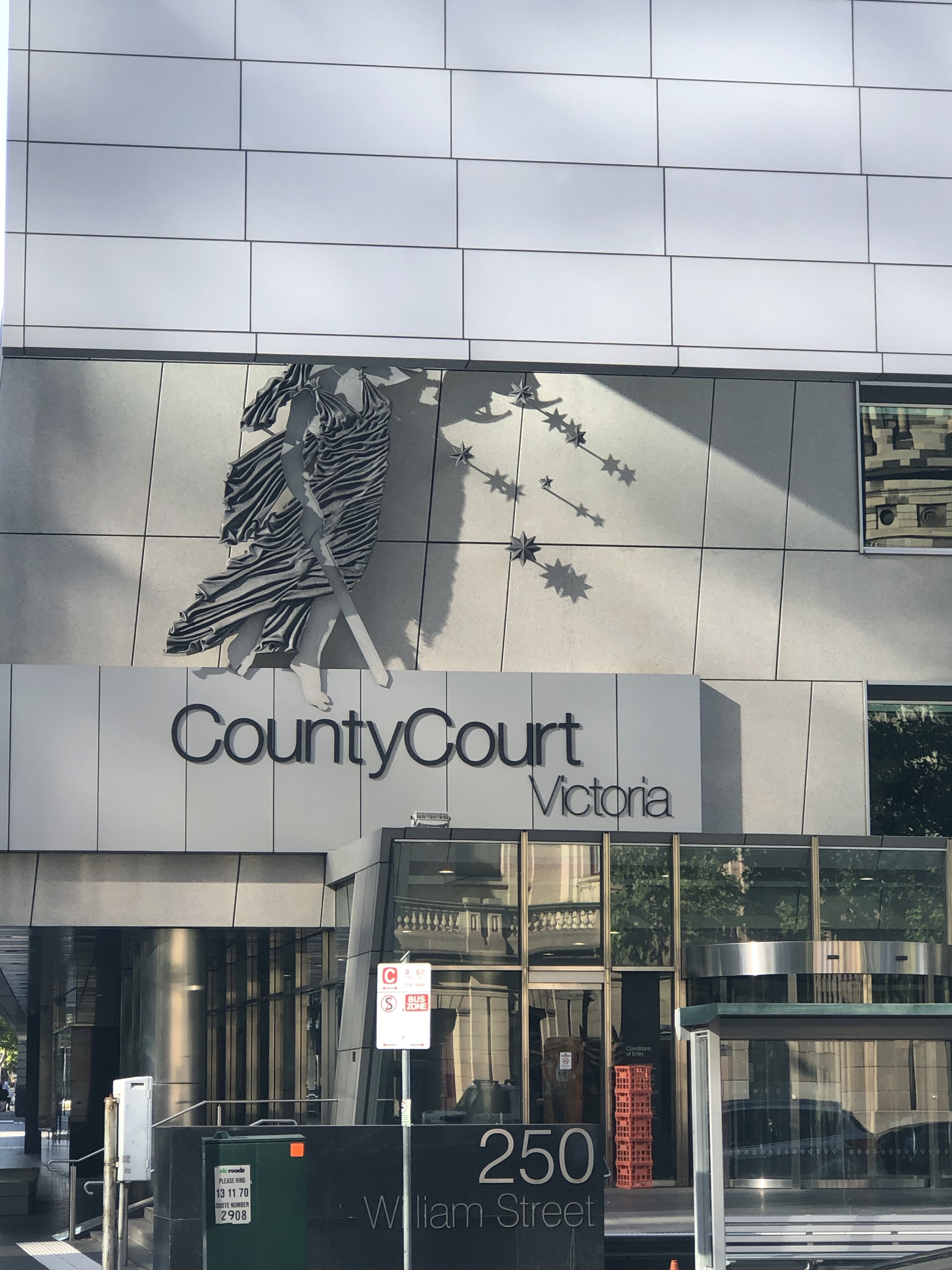
- Country Court building, William Street
- Interactive map of County Court of Victoria
- 37.8132°S 144.9575°E
- Established: 1852
- Jurisdiction: Victoria
- Location: Headquartered in Melbourne, with 12 circuit courts located in Bairnsdale, Ballarat, Bendigo, Geelong, Horsham, Mildura, Morwell, Sale, Shepparton, Wangaratta, Warrnambool and Wodonga
- Coordinates: 37.8132°S 144.9575°E
- Composition method: Appointed by Governor on the advice of the Executive Council
- Authorised by: County Court Act 1958 (Vic)
- Appeals to: Supreme Court of Victoria
- Appeals from: Magistrates' Court of Victoria
- Judge term length: Mandatory retirement by age 70
- Website: www.countycourt.vic.gov.au

Chief Judge
- Currently: Amanda Chambers
- Since: 27 May 2025

The County Court of Victoria is the intermediate court in the Australian state of Victoria. It is equivalent to district courts in the other states.

The County Court is the principal trial court in the state, having a broad criminal and civil jurisdiction. The court hears indictable offences (with the exception of murder, manslaughter, and treason), and has unlimited civil jurisdiction, though it generally only hears cases where the statement of claim exceeds the Magistrates' Court limit of $100,000. The court also possesses appellate jurisdiction for cases from the Magistrates' Court, while decisions of the County Court may be appealed to the Supreme Court.

With approximately 70 sitting judges, the court hears up to 12,000 cases annually. Amanda Chambers was named Chief Judge of the County Court on 27 May 2025.

== History ==
The County Court was first established in Victoria in 1852 by the County Courts Act 1852. County courts operated in the County of Bourke and some regional towns. The county courts were modelled on the British county courts, which were established in 1846. Originally, the court's principal purpose was to handle small civil claims. Since that time, the court's jurisdiction has expanded.

== Jurisdiction ==
In the hierarchy of Victorian courts, the County Court of Victoria sits above the Magistrates' Court of Victoria and below the Supreme Court of Victoria.

Judges of the County Court hear matters across three divisions – Criminal, Commercial and Common Law.

County Court judges also sit as the heads of jurisdiction at the Magistrates' Court of Victoria, Coroners Court of Victoria and the Children’s Court of Victoria and sit at the Victorian Civil and Administrative Tribunal as Vice-Presidents.

=== Criminal Division ===
The County Court hears all indictable criminal matters except treason, murder and manslaughter. The Court deals with a broad range of offences under Victorian and Commonwealth legislation including serious theft, armed robbery, drug trafficking, sexual offences, fraud and dishonesty offences, culpable driving, serious assault offences, and income and sales tax offences.

All trials are heard before a judge and a jury of 12 members of the community.

=== Criminal appeals ===
The County Court hears criminal appeals from the Magistrates' Court. These appeals are determined by judge alone. An appeal decision is generally final, except when a sentence of imprisonment is imposed and the Magistrates' Court did not originally impose a sentence of imprisonment. In such a case, the appellant may then appeal to the Court of Appeal, so long as leave is granted.

The County Court also hears appeals from the Criminal and Family Divisions of the Children’s Court.

=== Commercial and Common Law Divisions ===
The Court's Commercial and Common Law Divisions (collectively known as the Court's civil jurisdiction), have unlimited jurisdiction with no monetary cap on damages. Both divisions feature a number of 'lists' – specialist categories of cases that are administered by a judge.

The Commercial Division deals with matters that include debt recovery, contract, trust and property. It has four lists:

- General List
- Expedited List
- Banking and Finance List
- Building Cases List

The Common Law Division largely deals with damages and compensation cases. It consists of eight lists:

- Applications List
- Confiscation List
- Defamation List
- Family Property List
- General List
- Medical List
- Serious Injury Applications List
- WorkCover List

All civil matters are heard by a single judge or, at a party's request, by a judge and jury.

=== Adoption and Substitute Parentage ===
In Victoria, an adoption order legally transfers parental rights and responsibilities, guardianship and custody to the adoptive parents. The County Court hears approximately 50-80 adoption and parentage matters annually.

== Circuits ==
In addition to proceedings in Melbourne, County Court judges hear criminal and civil cases at 12 locations throughout Victoria: Bairnsdale, Ballarat, Bendigo, Geelong, Horsham, Mildura, Latrobe Valley (Morwell), Sale, Shepparton, Wangaratta, Warrnambool, and Wodonga.

== Koori Court ==
The County Koori Court was established under the County Court Amendment (Koori Court) Act 2008. The Act was assented to on 23 September 2008 and established the Koori Court as a Division of the County Court. The Latrobe Valley County Koori Court commenced on 19 November 2008, with the first sitting taking place on 2 February 2009. The objective of the County Koori Court is to ensure greater participation of the Aboriginal community in the sentencing process through the role played in that process by the Aboriginal Elders and Respected Persons and others such as the Koori Court Officer. It is only the judge who determines the sentence that is imposed.

The County Koori Court follows the Koori Court model introduced at the Magistrates' Court of Victoria and the Children's Court of Victoria. The County Koori Court currently sits at Latrobe Valley (Morwell), Melbourne, Mildura and Shepparton.

The County Koori Court can only be attended by Koori offenders who plead guilty to particular offences. Aboriginal Elders or Respected Persons advise the judge on cultural issues relating to the accused and his or her offending behaviour.

Elders and Respected Persons provide information on the background of the accused and possible reasons for offending behaviour. They may also explain relevant kinship connections, how particular crimes have affected the Indigenous community and provide advice on cultural practices, protocols and perspectives relevant to sentencing.

The same sentencing law, however, applies in the County Koori Court as applies in the mainstream County Court.

== Chief Judge of the County Court of Victoria ==
Amanda Chambers was appointed County Court Chief Judge on 27 May 2025. Chambers a Justice of the Supreme Court of Victoria.

Past Chief Judges of the County Court of Victoria:

- Peter Kidd 2015 – 2025
- Michael Rozenes 2002 – 2015
- Glenn Waldron 1982 – 2002
- Desmond Whelan 1975 – 1981

== See also ==
- Australian court hierarchy
