= Magistrates' Court of Victoria =

Lower court of Victoria, Australia

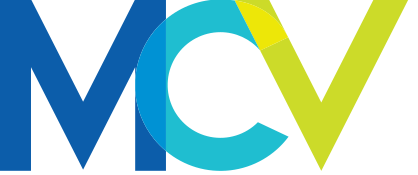
- Logo of the Magistrates' Court (left), Coat of Arms of Victoria (right)

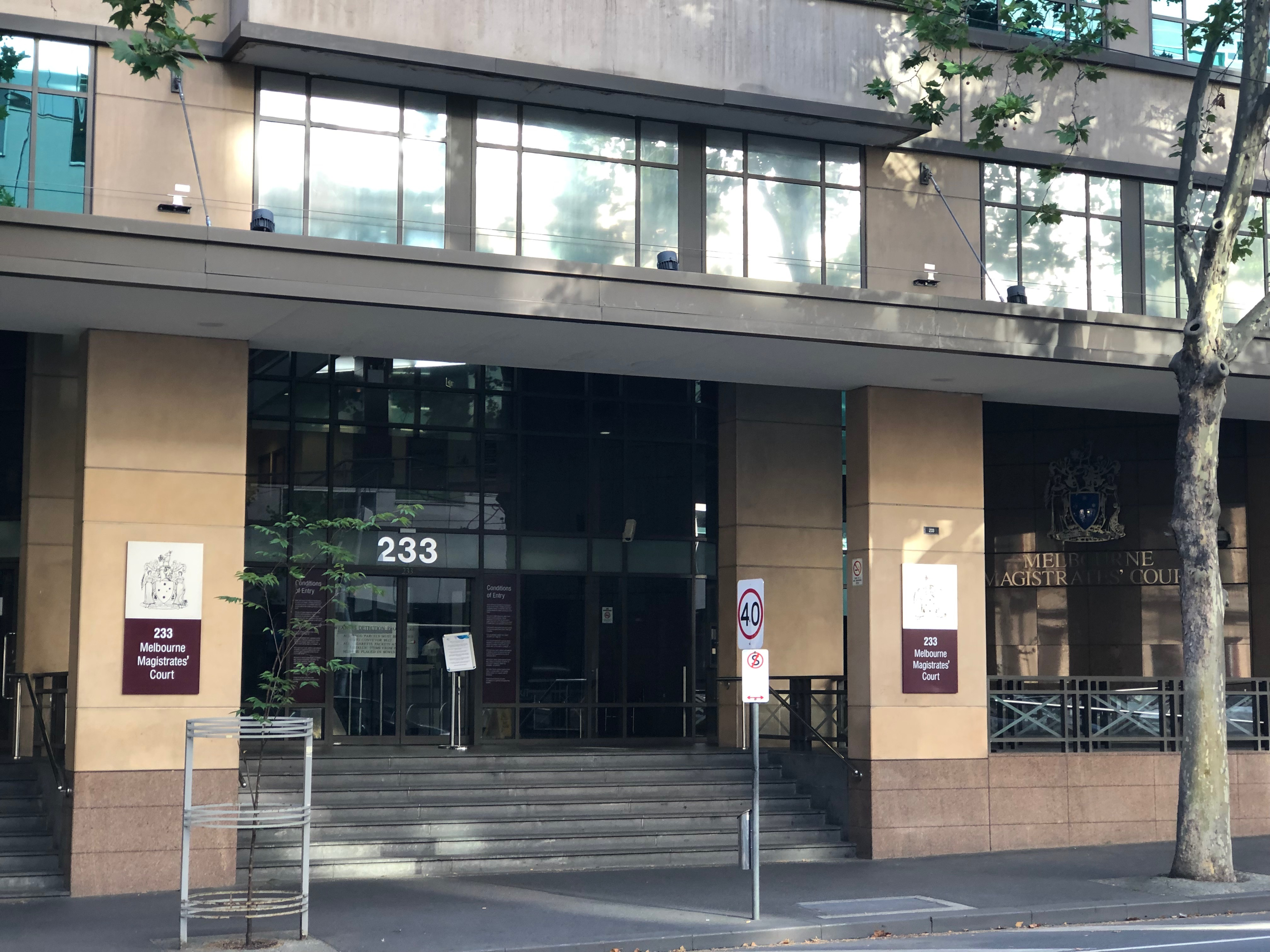
- Melbourne Magistrates' Court building
- Established: 1836
- Jurisdiction: Victoria
- Location: Headquartered in Melbourne, with 51 venues across Victoria
- Composition method: Appointed by Governor on the advice of the Executive Council
- Authorised by: Magistrates' Court Act 1989 (Vic)
- Appeals to: County Court of Victoria; Supreme Court of Victoria (Note: On questions of law)
- Judge term length: Mandatory retirement by age 70
- Website: www.mcv.vic.gov.au

Chief Magistrate
- Currently: Justice Lisa Hannan

Deputy Chief Magistrates
- Currently: Ms Felicity Broughton and Ms Susan Wakeling

The Magistrates' Court of Victoria is the lowest court in the Australian state of Victoria.

The court possesses original jurisdiction over summary offences and indictable offences heard summarily, as well as civil claims up to $100,000. It is also able to hear various pre-trial criminal procedures, including bail applications and committal hearings.

Decisions of the Magistrates' Court may be appealed to the County Court, with the Supreme Court also able to hear a limited number of appeals on questions of law.

== Layout ==
A typical courtroom layout consists of a witness box, a public gallery, the bar table (at which the parties sit), a raised bench for seating the sitting magistrate and a clerk and sometimes a dock for housing defendants in custody. Many Victorian magistrates' courts have video link facilities for witnesses to appear via remote video conference rather than in person and is used for when witnesses cannot travel or the prisoner is unable to travel to court in person.

== Cases ==
The Magistrates' Court of Victoria hears many different types of cases, such as:

- warrant application hearings;
- committal hearings and police prosecutions;
- bail application hearings;
- money claims and other civil disputes, not exceeding $100,000;
- family law and Family violence matters;

Magistrates are appointed by the Attorney General after receiving expressions of interest from Australian lawyers and are appointed as members of the Victims of Crime Assistance Tribunal (VOCAT), which is a separate and independent statutory entity which determines claims for compensation made by victims of crime and their families.

== History ==
Although the current court was established by the Magistrates' Court Act 1989 (No. 51 of 1989 (Vic)), Victoria has had magistrates since 1836, when the people of Melbourne elected an arbitrator of the city to resolve minor disputes. Captain William Lonsdale, a police magistrate, was appointed in 1836 and the first case was heard at a location near the present site of Southern Cross station (formerly Spencer Street station).

In 1838, a third court, the Court of Petty Sessions was created. By 1890, all three types of courts were held at 235 locations throughout Victoria.

On 20 January 1914, the new City Court was opened at Russell Street in Melbourne and Phillip Blashki JP was the first Chairman of the City Court Bench. The then Prime Minister, Alfred Deakin, presented Blashki with an illuminated address signed by 30 of the court's solicitors when he retired, aged 70.

Police magistrates were able to sit in on petty sessions courts, but generally two or three justices of the peace were required for cases to be heard. The Court of Petty Sessions was also originally attended to matters under £20, and even criminal matters, like drunkenness and minor assaults.

=== Recent history ===
On 29 May 2000, a Deed of Apology was signed for the treatment of Aboriginal peoples, which tied in with National Sorry Day actions, by the Chief Magistrate and Principal Registrar on behalf of the Magistrates' Court of Victoria. The deed was received at the Wangaratta courthouse by Wally Cooper.

In 2000, Chief Magistrate of the Court Michael Adams was forced to stand down on 31 October after claims that he harassed female members of his court. This was reported on The 7.30 Report and also in the Melbourne newspapers, resulting in the extraordinary vote.

The Chief Magistrate is currently Justice Lisa Hannan. The Chief Executive Officer is Andrew Tenni. The Principal Registrar is Simone Shields.

== Courthouses ==
=== Metropolitan locations ===
- Melbourne Magistrates' Court, Melbourne
- Broadmeadows Magistrates' Court, Broadmeadows
- Dandenong Magistrates' Court, Dandenong
- Frankston Magistrates' Court, Frankston
- Heidelberg Magistrates' Court, Heidelberg
- Moorabbin Justice Centre, Highett
- Neighbourhood Justice Centre, Collingwood
- Ringwood Magistrates' Court, Ringwood
- Sunshine Magistrates' Court, Sunshine
- Werribee Magistrates' Court, Werribee

=== Country locations ===
- Ararat
- Bacchus Marsh
- Bairnsdale
- Ballarat
- Benalla
- Bendigo
- Castlemaine
- Cobram
- Colac
- Corryong
- Dromana
- Echuca
- Edenhope
- Geelong
- Hamilton
- Hopetoun
- Horsham
- Kerang
- Korumburra
- Kyneton
- Latrobe Valley, Morwell
- Mansfield
- Maryborough
- Mildura
- Myrtleford
- Nhill
- Omeo
- Orbost
- Ouyen
- Portland
- Robinvale
- Sale
- Seymour
- Shepparton
- St Arnaud
- Stawell
- Swan Hill
- Wangaratta
- Warrnambool
- Wodonga
- Wonthaggi

=== Closed metropolitan locations ===
- Ferntree Gully Magistrates' Court, Ferntree Gully (latitude: 37°53'17.55"S, longitude: 145°17'31.59"E; now owned by Knox Community Health Service)
- Box Hill Magistrates' Court
- Springvale Magistrates' Court
- Prahran Magistrates' Court
- Williamstown Magistrates' Court, Williamstown
- Moonee Ponds Magistrates' Court, Moonee Ponds
- Preston Magistrates' Court, Preston
- Coburg Magistrates' Court, Coburg
- Camberwell Magistrates' Court

=== Closed country locations ===
- Kilmore Magistrates' Court
- Alexandra Magistrates' Court
- Yarrawonga Magistrates' Court
- Beechworth Magistrates' Court
- Warragul Magistrates' Court
- Yarram Magistrates' Court
- Lakes Entrance Magistrates' Court
- Casterton Magistrates' Court
- Warracknabeal Magistrates' Court
- Bright Magistrates' Court
- Euroa Magistrates' Court
- Leongatha Magistrates' Court
- Red Cliffs Magistrates' Court
- Cohuna Magistrates' Court
- Traralgon Magistrates' Court
- Nagambie Magistrates' Court
- Moe Magistrates' Court
