= List of judges of the Supreme Court of Victoria =

Judges who have served on the Supreme Court of Victoria as of 18 June 2022, include :

- Chief Justices of Victoria
- Presidents of the Court of Appeal
- Judges of Appeal
- Judges
- Reserve judges

Position	Name	Appointment commenced	Appointment ended	Term in office	Comments	Notes
Chief Justice	William à Beckett	19 January 1852	20 February 1857	5 years, 32 days		
Chief Justice	William Stawell	25 February 1857	24 September 1886	29 years, 211 days		
Chief Justice	George Higinbotham	24 September 1886	31 December 1892	6 years, 98 days		
Chief Justice	John Madden	9 January 1893	10 March 1918	25 years, 60 days		
Chief Justice	William Irvine	9 April 1918	30 September 1935	17 years, 174 days		
Chief Justice	Frederick Mann	1 October 1935	31 January 1944	8 years, 122 days		
Chief Justice	Edmund Herring	2 February 1944	1 September 1964	20 years, 212 days		
Chief Justice	Henry Winneke	2 September 1964	31 May 1974	9 years, 271 days		
Chief Justice	John Young	1 June 1974	16 December 1991	17 years, 198 days		
Chief Justice	John Harber Phillips	17 December 1991	17 October 2003	11 years, 304 days		
Chief Justice	Marilyn Warren	26 November 2003	1 October 2017	13 years, 309 days		
Chief Justice	Anne Ferguson	2 October 2017	2 February 2025	8 years, 111 days		
Chief Justice	Richard Niall	3 February 2025		352 days		
President, Court of Appeal	John Winneke	7 June 1995	15 July 2005	10 years, 38 days		
President, Court of Appeal	Chris Maxwell	18 July 2005	June 2022	16 years, 338 days		
President, Court of Appeal	Karin Emerton	21 June 2022		3 years, 214 days		
Judge of Appeal	Robert Brooking	7 June 1995	6 March 2002	6 years, 272 days		
Judge of Appeal	Robert Tadgell	7 June 1995	30 May 2001	5 years, 357 days		
Judge of Appeal	William Ormiston	7 June 1995	24 February 2006	10 years, 262 days		
Judge of Appeal	John Phillips	7 June 1995	22 May 2004	8 years, 350 days		
Judge of Appeal	Kenneth Hayne	7 June 1995	21 September 1997	2 years, 106 days	Appointed to the High Court	
Judge of Appeal	Stephen Charles	7 June 1995	21 April 2006	10 years, 318 days		
Judge of Appeal	Frank Callaway	7 June 1995	27 July 2007	12 years, 50 days		
Judge of Appeal	John Batt	6 May 1997	3 June 2005	8 years, 28 days		
Judge of Appeal	Susan Kenny	25 July 1997	15 October 1998	1 year, 82 days	Appointed to the Federal Court	
Judge of Appeal	Peter Buchanan	28 October 1997	11 October 2013	15 years, 348 days		
Judge of Appeal	Alex Chernov	13 October 1998	29 February 2008	9 years, 139 days		
Judge of Appeal	Frank Vincent	12 June 2001	20 August 2009	8 years, 69 days		
Judge of Appeal	Geoffrey Eames	15 March 2002	27 July 2007	5 years, 134 days		
Judge of Appeal	Geoffrey Nettle	7 June 2004	2 February 2012	7 years, 240 days	Appointed to the High Court	
Judge of Appeal	David Ashley	21 June 2005	1 February 2012	6 years, 225 days		
Judge of Appeal	Marcia Neave	22 February 2006	23 August 2014	8 years, 182 days		
Judge of Appeal	Robert Redlich	8 May 2006	3 March 2016	9 years, 300 days		
Judge of Appeal	Murray Kellam	16 May 2007	15 June 2009	2 years, 30 days		
Judge of Appeal	Julie Dodds-Streeton	8 August 2007	1 February 2010	2 years, 177 days	Appointed to the Federal Court	
Judge of Appeal	Mark Weinberg	28 July 2008	13 May 2018	9 years, 289 days	Formerly a judge of the Federal Court	
Judge of Appeal	Philip Mandie	17 August 2009	31 August 2012	3 years, 14 days		
Judge of Appeal	Bernard Bongiorno	17 August 2009	31 December 2012	3 years, 136 days		
Judge of Appeal	David Harper	4 November 2009	28 June 2013	3 years, 236 days		
Judge of Appeal	Hartley Hansen	19 July 2010	31 August 2012	2 years, 43 days		
Judge of Appeal	Pamela Tate	16 September 2010		15 years, 127 days		
Judge of Appeal	Robert Osborn	7 February 2012	21 June 2018	6 years, 134 days		
Judge of Appeal	Simon Whelan	16 October 2012	9 April 2020	7 years, 176 days		
Judge of Appeal	Phillip Priest	23 October 2012		13 years, 90 days		
Judge of Appeal	Paul Coghlan	1 January 2013	11 January 2014	1 year, 10 days		
Judge of Appeal	Joseph Santamaria	20 August 2013	14 July 2018	4 years, 328 days		
Judge of Appeal	David Beach	22 October 2013		12 years, 91 days		
Judge of Appeal	Emilios Kyrou	29 July 2014		11 years, 176 days		
Judge of Appeal	Anne Ferguson	12 August 2014	2 October 2017	3 years, 51 days	Appointed Chief Justice	
Judge of Appeal	Stephen Kaye	3 February 2015	13 December 2021	6 years, 313 days		
Judge of Appeal	Stephen McLeish	3 March 2015		10 years, 324 days		
Judge of Appeal	Richard Niall	28 November 2017		8 years, 54 days		
Judge of Appeal	Kim Hargrave	19 December 2017		8 years, 33 days		
Judge of Appeal	Terry Forrest	10 July 2018		7 years, 195 days		
Judge of Appeal	Karin Emerton	10 July 2018	21 June 2022	3 years, 346 days	Appointed President of the Court of Appeal	
Judge of Appeal	Michael Sifris	2 June 2020		5 years, 233 days		
Judge of Appeal	Maree Kennedy	15 December 2020		5 years, 37 days		
Judge of Appeal	Kristen Walker	3 May 2021		4 years, 263 days	Previously Solicitor-General of Victoria	
Judge of Appeal	Cameron Macaulay	1 February 2022	20 December 2024	3 years, 354 days		
Judge of Appeal	Rowena Orr	18 April 2024		1 year, 278 days	Previously Solicitor-General of Victoria	
Judge, District of Port Phillip (Note: Prior to the separation of the Port Phillip District of New South Wales into the independent colony of Victoria, the Supreme Court of New South Wales was the superior court in the District. A local division of that court, the Supreme Court of New South Wales for the District of Port Phillip, was established in 1840 and existed until the Supreme Court of Victoria was created in 1852.)	John Willis	8 February 1841	24 June 1843	2 years, 136 days		
Judge, District of Port Phillip	William Jeffcott	1 July 1843	December 1844	1 year, 153–183 days		
Judge, District of Port Phillip	Roger Therry	9 January 1845	February 1846	1 year, 23–50 days		
Judge, District of Port Phillip	William à Beckett	28 February 1846	19 January 1852	5 years, 325 days		
Judge	Redmond Barry	19 January 1852	23 November 1880	28 years, 309 days		
Judge	Edward Williams	21 July 1852	30 April 1874	21 years, 283 days		
Judge	Robert Molesworth	17 June 1856	6 May 1886	29 years, 323 days		
Judge	Thomas Fellows	18 December 1872	8 April 1878	5 years, 111 days		
Judge	James Stephen	1 May 1874	14 August 1881	7 years, 105 days		
Judge	George Higinbotham	19 July 1880	31 December 1892	12 years, 165 days		
Judge	Hartley Williams	4 July 1881	9 June 1903	21 years, 340 days		
Judge	Edward Dundas Holroyd	19 August 1881	9 May 1906	24 years, 263 days		
Judge	George Kerferd	1 January 1886	31 December 1889	3 years, 364 days		
Judge	George Webb	6 May 1886	20 September 1891	5 years, 137 days		
Judge	Thomas à Beckett	30 September 1886	30 June 1917	30 years, 273 days		
Judge	Henry Hodges	12 February 1889	8 August 1919	30 years, 177 days		
Judge	Joseph Hood	1 February 1890	31 December 1921	31 years, 333 days		
Judge	Leo Cussen	19 March 1906	17 May 1933	27 years, 59 days		
Judge	William Schutt	24 July 1919	31 December 1926	7 years, 160 days		
Judge	Frederick Mann	24 July 1919	31 January 1944	24 years, 191 days		
Judge	William McArthur	27 January 1920	31 March 1934	14 years, 63 days		
Judge	James Macfarlan	30 January 1922	31 December 1949	27 years, 335 days		
Judge	Charles Lowe	28 January 1927	31 January 1964	37 years, 3 days		
Judge	Charles Leonard Gavan Duffy (Note: Charles Leonard Gavan Duffy was the son of High Court judge Sir Frank Gavan Duffy.)	1 June 1933	12 August 1961	28 years, 72 days		
Judge	Fred Martin	29 January 1934	31 January 1957	23 years, 2 days		
Judge	Norman John O'Bryan (Note: Norman Michael O'Bryan was the son of Norman John O'Bryan.)	2 February 1939	16 October 1966	27 years, 256 days		
Judge	Wilfred Fullagar (Note: Richard Fullagar was the son of High Court judge Sir Wilfred Fullagar.)	1 August 1945	8 February 1950	4 years, 191 days	Appointed to the High Court.	
Judge	John Vincent Barry	14 January 1947	8 November 1969	22 years, 298 days		
Judge	Arthur Dean	8 February 1949	24 May 1965	16 years, 105 days		
Judge	Reginald Sholl	1 February 1950	31 January 1966	15 years, 364 days		
Judge	Thomas Weetman Smith	1 February 1950	16 September 1973	23 years, 227 days		
Judge	Edward Hudson	27 September 1950	15 December 1966	16 years, 79 days		
Judge	Robert Monahan	3 March 1955	11 April 1970	15 years, 39 days		
Judge	George Pape	18 February 1957	28 January 1975	17 years, 344 days		
Judge	Alexander Adam	27 May 1959	30 August 1974	15 years, 95 days		
Judge	Douglas Little	3 February 1959	30 August 1974	15 years, 208 days		
Judge	Gregory Gowans	22 August 1961	8 September 1976	15 years, 17 days		
Judge	Oliver Gillard	2 October 1962	13 May 1978	15 years, 223 days		
Judge	John Starke	31 January 1964	30 November 1985	21 years, 303 days		
Judge	Edward Barber	7 April 1964	25 February 1977	12 years, 324 days		
Judge	Murray McInerney	28 May 1965	10 February 1983	17 years, 258 days		
Judge	George Lush	1 February 1966	5 October 1983	17 years, 246 days		
Judge	Clifford Menhennitt	27 April 1966	29 October 1979	13 years, 185 days		
Judge	Hibbert Newton	10 January 1967	1 June 1977	10 years, 142 days		
Judge	Francis Nelson	1 February 1968	14 June 1977	9 years, 133 days		
Judge	Kevin Anderson	29 April 1969	4 September 1984	15 years, 128 days		
Judge	William Crockett	2 December 1969	16 April 1996	26 years, 136 days		
Judge	Ninian Stephen	30 June 1970	29 February 1972	1 year, 244 days	Appointed to the High Court.	
Judge	William Kaye	1 March 1972	8 February 1991	18 years, 344 days		
Judge	John Norris	1 March 1968	11 June 1975	7 years, 102 days		
Judge	Benjamin Dunn	1 May 1968	31 July 1977	9 years, 91 days		
Judge	Peter Murphy	12 April 1973	15 April 1992	19 years, 3 days		
Judge	William Harris	9 October 1973	17 August 1978	4 years, 312 days		
Judge	John Young	30 April 1974	16 December 1991	17 years, 230 days		
Judge	Tony Murray	5 September 1974	11 May 1988	13 years, 249 days		
Judge	Richard Fullagar	29 January 1975	11 February 1994	19 years, 13 days		
Judge	Kenneth Jenkinson	18 February 1975	1 November 1982	7 years, 256 days		
Judge	Richard Griffith	10 June 1975	1 December 1976	1 year, 174 days		
Judge	Richard McGarvie	1 June 1976	22 April 1992	15 years, 326 days		
Judge	Norman Michael O'Bryan	2 February 1977	6 May 1992	15 years, 94 days		
Judge	Robert Brooking	22 February 1977	6 March 2002	25 years, 12 days		
Judge	Kenneth Marks	15 June 1977	28 January 1994	16 years, 227 days		
Judge	Ian Gray	12 July 1977	30 March 1990	12 years, 261 days		
Judge	Alfred King	19 July 1977	13 February 1991	13 years, 209 days		
Judge	Barry Beach	18 July 1978	15 February 2003	24 years, 212 days		
Judge	James Gobbo	18 July 1978	28 February 1994	15 years, 225 days		
Judge	Alec Southwell	3 April 1979	11 April 1997	18 years, 8 days		
Judge	Robert Tadgell	4 March 1980	30 May 2001	21 years, 87 days		
Judge	Alastair Nicholson	16 November 1982	31 January 1988	5 years, 76 days	Appointed to the Family Court	
Judge	George Hampel	16 March 1983	31 August 2000	17 years, 168 days		
Judge	William Ormiston	22 November 1983	24 February 2006	22 years, 94 days		
Judge	Howard Nathan	22 November 1983	17 April 1997	13 years, 146 days		
Judge	John Harber Phillips	7 November 1984	13 August 1990	5 years, 279 days		
Judge	Frank Vincent	30 April 1985	20 August 2009	24 years, 112 days		
Judge	Bernard Teague	13 October 1987	15 February 2008	20 years, 125 days		
Judge	Philip Cummins	17 February 1988	8 November 2009	21 years, 264 days		
Judge	Allan McDonald	19 May 1988	31 August 2002	14 years, 104 days		
Judge	Thomas Harrison Smith	1 May 1990	31 July 2009	19 years, 91 days		
Judge	John Phillips	22 May 1990	22 May 2004	14 years, 0 days		
Judge	David Ashley	21 August 1990	1 June 2012	21 years, 285 days		
Judge	John Hedigan	30 January 1991	30 August 2001	10 years, 212 days		
Judge	John Coldrey	19 February 1991	4 April 2008	17 years, 45 days		
Judge	David Byrne	20 August 1991	20 May 2010	18 years, 273 days		
Judge	David Harper	11 March 1992	28 June 2013	21 years, 109 days		
Judge	Kenneth Hayne	8 April 1992	21 September 1997	5 years, 166 days	Appointed to the High Court.	
Judge	Geoffrey Eames	26 May 1992	27 July 2007	15 years, 62 days		
Judge	John Batt	8 March 1994	3 June 2005	11 years, 87 days		
Judge	Hartley Hansen	6 April 1994	31 July 2012	18 years, 116 days		
Judge	Philip Mandie	10 May 1994	31 August 2012	18 years, 113 days		
Judge	John Winneke	7 June 1995	15 July 2005	10 years, 38 days		
Judge	Stephen Charles	7 June 1995	21 April 2006	10 years, 318 days		
Judge	Frank Callaway	7 June 1995	10 June 2007	12 years, 3 days		
Judge	Rosemary Balmford	6 March 1996	14 September 2003	7 years, 192 days		
Judge	Bill Gillard	6 May 1997	31 October 2007	10 years, 178 days		
Judge	Alex Chernov	6 May 1997	29 February 2008	10 years, 299 days		
Judge	Susan Kenny	25 July 1997	15 October 1998	1 year, 82 days		
Judge	Peter Buchanan	28 October 1997	11 October 2013	15 years, 348 days		
Judge	Murray Kellam	28 January 1998	15 June 2009	11 years, 138 days		
Judge	Marilyn Warren	13 October 1998	1 October 2017	18 years, 353 days		
Judge	Bernard Bongiorno	18 December 2000	31 December 2012	12 years, 13 days		
Judge	David Habersberger	3 July 2001	28 March 2013	11 years, 268 days		
Judge	Geoffrey Flatman	18 July 2001	18 September 2002	1 year, 62 days		
Judge	Tony Pagone	3 October 2001; 16 May 2007	30 June 2002; 20 June 2013	270 days 6 years, 35 days	Appointed to the Federal Court	
Judge	Robert Osborn	9 May 2002	21 June 2018	16 years, 43 days		
Judge	Geoffrey Nettle	23 July 2002	2 February 2012	9 years, 194 days		
Judge	Julie Dodds-Streeton	23 July 2002	1 February 2010	7 years, 193 days		
Judge	Robert Redlich	25 October 2002	3 March 2016	13 years, 130 days		
Judge	Katharine Williams	25 October 2002	12 February 2015	12 years, 110 days		
Judge	Stuart Morris	9 April 2003	9 April 2007	4 years, 0 days		
Judge	Stephen Kaye	16 December 2003	13 December 2021	17 years, 362 days		
Judge	Simon Whelan	17 March 2004	9 April 2020	16 years, 23 days		
Judge	Elizabeth Hollingworth	7 June 2004		21 years, 228 days		
Judge	Kevin Bell	10 February 2005	5 March 2020	15 years, 24 days		
Judge	Kim Hargrave	18 March 2005		20 years, 309 days		
Judge	Betty King	21 June 2005	14 August 2015	10 years, 54 days		
Judge	Chris Maxwell	18 July 2005		20 years, 187 days		
Judge	Anthony Cavanough	8 May 2006		19 years, 258 days		
Judge	Elizabeth Curtain	3 October 2006	8 May 2014	7 years, 217 days		
Judge	Paul Coghlan	8 August 2007	31 December 2012	5 years, 145 days		
Judge	Ross Robson	8 August 2007	20 July 2016	8 years, 347 days		
Judge	Jack Forrest	8 August 2007	28 March 2018	10 years, 232 days		
Judge	Lex Lasry	23 October 2007	22 June 2018	10 years, 242 days		
Judge	James Judd	6 March 2008	31 March 2018	10 years, 25 days		
Judge	Peter Vickery	6 May 2008	8 May 2018	10 years, 2 days		
Judge	Emilios Kyrou	15 May 2008		17 years, 251 days		
Judge	David Beach	5 September 2008		17 years, 138 days		
Judge	Jennifer Davies	6 April 2009	4 July 2013	4 years, 89 days	Appointed to the Federal Court	
Judge	Terry Forrest	13 October 2009		16 years, 100 days		
Judge	Karin Emerton	13 October 2009		16 years, 100 days		
Judge	Iain Ross	9 November 2009	1 March 2012	2 years, 113 days	Appointed to the Federal Court and Fair Work Commission	
Judge	Clyde Croft	9 November 2009	5 October 2019	9 years, 330 days		
Judge	Anne Ferguson	3 May 2010		15 years, 263 days		
Judge	Michael Sifris	13 July 2010		15 years, 192 days		
Judge	Peter Almond	28 July 2010	31 March 2021	10 years, 246 days		
Judge	John Dixon	13 September 2010		15 years, 130 days		
Judge	Cameron Macaulay	13 September 2010	20 December 2024	15 years, 130 days		
Judge	Kate McMillan	8 March 2012		13 years, 319 days		
Judge	Gregory Garde	29 May 2012	1 April 2019	6 years, 307 days		
Judge	John Digby	19 November 2012	18 July 2021	8 years, 241 days		
Judge	James Elliott	25 March 2013		12 years, 302 days		
Judge	Tim Ginnane	4 June 2013		12 years, 231 days		
Judge	Melanie Sloss	30 July 2013		12 years, 175 days		
Judge	Michael Croucher	30 July 2013		12 years, 175 days		
Judge	Joseph Santamaria	20 August 2013	14 July 2018	4 years, 328 days		
Judge	Jack Rush	26 November 2013	1 February 2016	2 years, 67 days		
Judge	Joanne Cameron	12 August 2014	30 June 2020	5 years, 323 days		
Judge	Christopher Beale	2 September 2014		11 years, 141 days		
Judge	Michael McDonald	16 September 2014		11 years, 127 days		
Judge	Rita Incerti	3 February 2015		10 years, 352 days	Formerly known as Justice Rita Zammit	
Judge	Stephen McLeish	3 March 2015		10 years, 324 days		
Judge	Peter Riordan	10 March 2015		10 years, 317 days		
Judge	Jane Dixon	17 August 2015		10 years, 157 days		
Judge	Andrew Keogh	4 April 2016		9 years, 292 days		
Judge	Peter Kidd	24 May 2016		9 years, 242 days	Also Chief Judge of the County Court of Victoria	
Judge	Maree Kennedy	25 July 2016		9 years, 180 days		
Judge	Richard Niall	28 November 2017		8 years, 54 days		
Judge	John Champion	19 December 2017	13 August 2021	3 years, 237 days		
Judge	Michelle Quigley	19 December 2017		8 years, 33 days	Also President of the Victorian Civil and Administrative Tribunal	
Judge	Matthew Connock	10 April 2018		7 years, 286 days		
Judge	Melinda Richards	24 April 2018		7 years, 272 days		
Judge	Kevin Lyons	22 May 2018		7 years, 244 days		
Judge	Lesley Taylor	10 July 2018		7 years, 195 days		
Judge	Steven Moore	10 July 2018		7 years, 195 days		
Judge	Andrew Tinney	16 July 2018		7 years, 189 days		
Judge	Jacinta Forbes	16 April 2019		6 years, 280 days		
Judge	Lisa Nicols	22 October 2019		6 years, 91 days		
Judge	Jim Delany	2 June 2020		5 years, 233 days		
Judge	Kathryn Stynes	22 June 2020		5 years, 213 days		
Judge	James Gorton	15 December 2020		5 years, 37 days		
Judge	Michael Osborne	15 December 2020		5 years, 37 days		
Judge	Steven O'Meara	18 May 2021		4 years, 248 days		
Judge	Richard Attiwill	18 May 2021		4 years, 248 days		
Judge	Catherine Button	9 August 2021		4 years, 165 days		
Judge	Mandy Fox	13 August 2021		4 years, 161 days		
Judge	Andrea Tsalamandris	2 February 2022		3 years, 353 days		
Judge	Lisa Hannan	9 August 2021		4 years, 165 days	Also Chief Magistrate of the Magistrates Court of Victoria	
Acting judge	Thomas Cope	August 1885	June 1886	275–333 days		
Reserve judge	Peter Murphy	16 April 1992	5 May 1993	1 year, 19 days		
Reserve judge	Richard Fullagar	12 February 1994	9 May 1994	86 days		
Reserve judge	Norman Michael O'Bryan	7 May 1992	7 April 2004	11 years, 336 days		
Reserve judge	Robert Brooking	14 May 2002	21 September 2003	1 year, 130 days		
Reserve judge	Ian Gray	30 March 1990	5 March 2001	10 years, 340 days		
Reserve judge	Alec Southwell	9 September 1997	31 October 2001	4 years, 52 days		
Reserve judge	Howard Nathan	18 April 1997	1 September 2005	8 years, 136 days		
Reserve judge	Rosemary Balmford	29 September 2003	31 May 2005	1 year, 244 days		
Reserve judge	John Phillips	22 May 2004	28 February 2005	282 days		
Reserve judge	David Ashley	9 April 2013	1 February 2020	6 years, 298 days		
Reserve judge	Philip Mandie	2 July 2013	1 July 2018	4 years, 364 days		
Reserve judge	Hartley Hansen	2 July 2013	1 July 2018	4 years, 364 days		
Reserve judge	Bernard Bongiorno	2 July 2013	1 July 2018	4 years, 364 days		
Reserve judge	Paul Coghlan	12 January 2014	23 January 2016	2 years, 11 days		
Reserve judge	Malcolm Blue	28 April 2015		10 years, 268 days		
Reserve judge	Julie Dodds-Streeton	24 November 2015	1 December 2019	4 years, 7 days		
Reserve judge	Robert Redlich	4 March 2016	3 November 2017	1 year, 244 days		
Reserve judge	Ross Robson	1 August 2016		5 years, 271 days		
Reserve judge	Paul Coghlan	11 July 2017	22 January 2022	4 years, 195 days		
Reserve judge	Mark Weinberg	13 May 2018	31 January 2021	2 years, 263 days		
Reserve judge	Lex Lasry	3 July 2018		7 years, 202 days		
Reserve judge	Gregory Garde	1 April 2019		6 years, 295 days		
Reserve judge	Simon Whelan	13 October 2020		5 years, 100 days		
Reserve judge	Clyde Croft	6 July 2021		4 years, 199 days		
Reserve judge	Jack Forrest	6 July 2021		4 years, 199 days		
Reserve judge	Stephen Kaye	14 December 2021		4 years, 38 days		
Reserve judge	John Champion	17 January 2022		4 years, 4 days		

== See also ==
- Judiciary of Australia
- Victorian Bar
