= Silk–Miller police murders =

1998 murders in Victoria, Australia

- Victims Gary Silk and Rodney Miller
- Location: Cochranes Road, Moorabbin, Victoria, Australia
- Date: 16 August 1998 c. 12:08 AM (UTC+10)
- Target: Sergeant Gary Silk, Senior Constable Rodney Miller
- Weapons: .357 magnum, .38 calibre handgun
- Deaths: 2 police officers
- Accused: Jason Roberts, Bandali Debs

The Silk–Miller murders (also known as the Moorabbin Police murders) was the name given to the murders of Victoria Police officers Sergeant Gary Silk and Senior Constable Rodney Miller in Cochranes Road, Moorabbin, Victoria, Australia, on 16 August 1998.

On the night of the murders, the police officers were staking out the Silky Emperor Restaurant near the corner of Cochranes and Warrigal Roads, Moorabbin, at approximately midnight when they were gunned down at close range.

== Murders ==
On the night of 15 August 1998, Sergeant Gary Silk, 34, and Senior Constable Rodney Miller, 35, were seconded to a Victoria Police Armed Robbery Squad operation, named Operation Hamada, investigating a series of armed robberies committed in at least ten restaurants over a seven-year period, starting on 20 February 1991. Silk and Miller, operating an unmarked patrol car (callsign Moorabbin 404), were assigned to stake out one of the potential targets: the Korean BBQ “Silky Emperor”. At 10:50pm, Silk and Miller drove from the Korean BBQ when it closed for the night and joined two more officers sitting in another unmarked patrol car (callsign Moorabbin 403) parked outside the Silky Emperor Restaurant, arriving at 11pm and taking position in an underground car park next to the Silky Emperor. At 11:28pm, Silk and Miller spotted a dark blue Honda Civic pulling into the underground car park. Upon seeing Silk and Miller, the Honda then reversed out of the car park at high speed, leading to a brief chase, only for Silk and Miller to lose the vehicle on the back streets. After losing the Honda, Silk and Miller drove back to the underground car park and continued the stake out.

At 12:08am on 16 August, Silk and Miller spotted a dark-coloured Hyundai Excel X3 hatchback pulling in and out of the car park, prompting them to follow the vehicle. After following the vehicle a short distance, Silk and Miller pulled the vehicle over. With Miller standing between the vehicle and the unmarked police vehicle, Silk walked over to the passenger side of the vehicle. As he asked for the driver's details, the driver produced a revolver and fired through the Hyundai's passenger window, hitting Silk in the chest and pelvic area, sending Silk to the ground. Miller, seeing Silk being shot, pulled out his service revolver and went to return fire, but a shot fired through the Hyundai's rear window caused Miller to duck, only for a second shot to be fired through the shattered rear window and hitting Miller under his left arm and exiting through his hip. After shooting Miller, the gunman got out of the vehicle, walked over to Silk lying on the verge next to the passenger side of the Hyundai, and fired a third shot to the head, killing Silk instantly. Despite being wounded, Miller returned four shots at the Hyundai as it was speeding off.

Upon hearing the shots over the two-way radio, Silk and Miller's fellow officers in Moorabbin 403 responded to the scene, arriving at 12:11am and finding Silk dead and Miller missing; despite being mortally wounded, Miller had managed to walk the short distance back to the restaurant before collapsing on the verge, where he was found by a uniformed officer, still alive. As Miller was loaded into the ambulance, he told responding officers that he and Silk had been shot by two gunmen. Miller was taken to Monash Medical Centre and later died of his injuries at 4:39am.

== Operation Lorimer ==
The police team investigating the murders was code-named Operation Lorimer. Victorian Police Minister Andre Haermeyer announced a A$500,000 reward for information about the murders, and later said he would consider increasing the reward.

Evidence left at the scene of the crime included pieces of glass, suspected to be from the getaway car used by the killers. Police tested this glass and discovered it came from a late-model Hyundai hatchback. After extensive investigations, which took the team to the Hyundai factory in South Korea to obtain vital prosecution evidence, police narrowed down the exact make and model of the vehicle involved in the shootings from the glass samples. The vehicle was registered to the daughter of known criminal Bandali Debs. Police also recovered three spent bullet casings matching those fired from Miller's service revolver, indicating Miller's fourth shot likely hit the gunmen's car. Ballistics testing on the bullets recovered from the bodies of Silk and Miller revealed that two different firearms were used in the murders. Ballistics also revealed the bullets matched those recovered from the scenes of the armed robberies that Silk and Miller were investigating as part of Operation Hamada.

=== Arrests ===
On 24 September 2001, Debs, a father of five from Narre Warren, and Jason Joseph Roberts, boyfriend of Debs' daughter, an apprentice builder, of Cranbourne, faced charges relating to the murders of Silk and Miller as well as 13 other charges of armed robbery relating to offences alleged to have occurred between March and July 1998.

=== Guilty verdict ===
On 17 February 2003, the trial began in the Supreme Court of Victoria, presided over by Justice Philip Cummins. On 23 February 2003, Debs and Roberts were found guilty of the murders and sentenced to life imprisonment. Debs served part of his sentence at maximum security Victorian prison HM Prison Barwon; and, during the 2022 retrial of Roberts, he appeared via video-link from Goulburn Supermax Prison in New South Wales.

== Operation Gloucester ==
In 2015, the Independent Broad-based Anti-corruption Commission (IBAC) started investigating improper practices during Lorimer Taskforce, but it was closed due to lack of evidence. In November 2017, IBAC reopened Operation Gloucester after new evidence was obtained via media reports supporting the original allegations of misconduct. On 12 December 2018, IBAC announced it would hold public hearings on 4 February 2019 into "alleged serious misconduct" by Victoria Police officers.

== Jason Roberts retrial ==
On 23 June 2020, Roberts's appeal against his conviction was heard in the Supreme Court of Victoria's Court of Appeal by Justices of Appeal Terry Forrest and Robert Osborn, and Acting Justice of Appeal Lesley Taylor. On 10 November 2020, Roberts's conviction was quashed and a retrial was ordered based on evidence tampering by Victoria Police. The appeal judges found that the misconduct of one officer had corrupted the initial trial "as to poison it to its root". It was found that Senior Constable Glenn Pullin destroyed his original statement, submitting a backdated statement instead, indicating that there were two offenders.

Roberts's retrial was held over four months in 2022, and featured 90 witnesses, 200 exhibits, and hours of recorded conversations. On 11 July 2022, the Supreme Court jury found Roberts not guilty of two charges of murder after five days of deliberation. Justice Stephen Kaye granted Roberts bail. Kaye commended the jury for its effort, noting that in his whole experience "this case has been the hardest one I’ve seen for a jury, and I really mean that".

Roberts spent a total of 22 years in prison and is due back in court to hear the sentence for 10 charges of armed robbery he has admitted to. In a statement via the police union, the families of the victims said they were "absolutely devastated by the decision".

== Aftermath ==
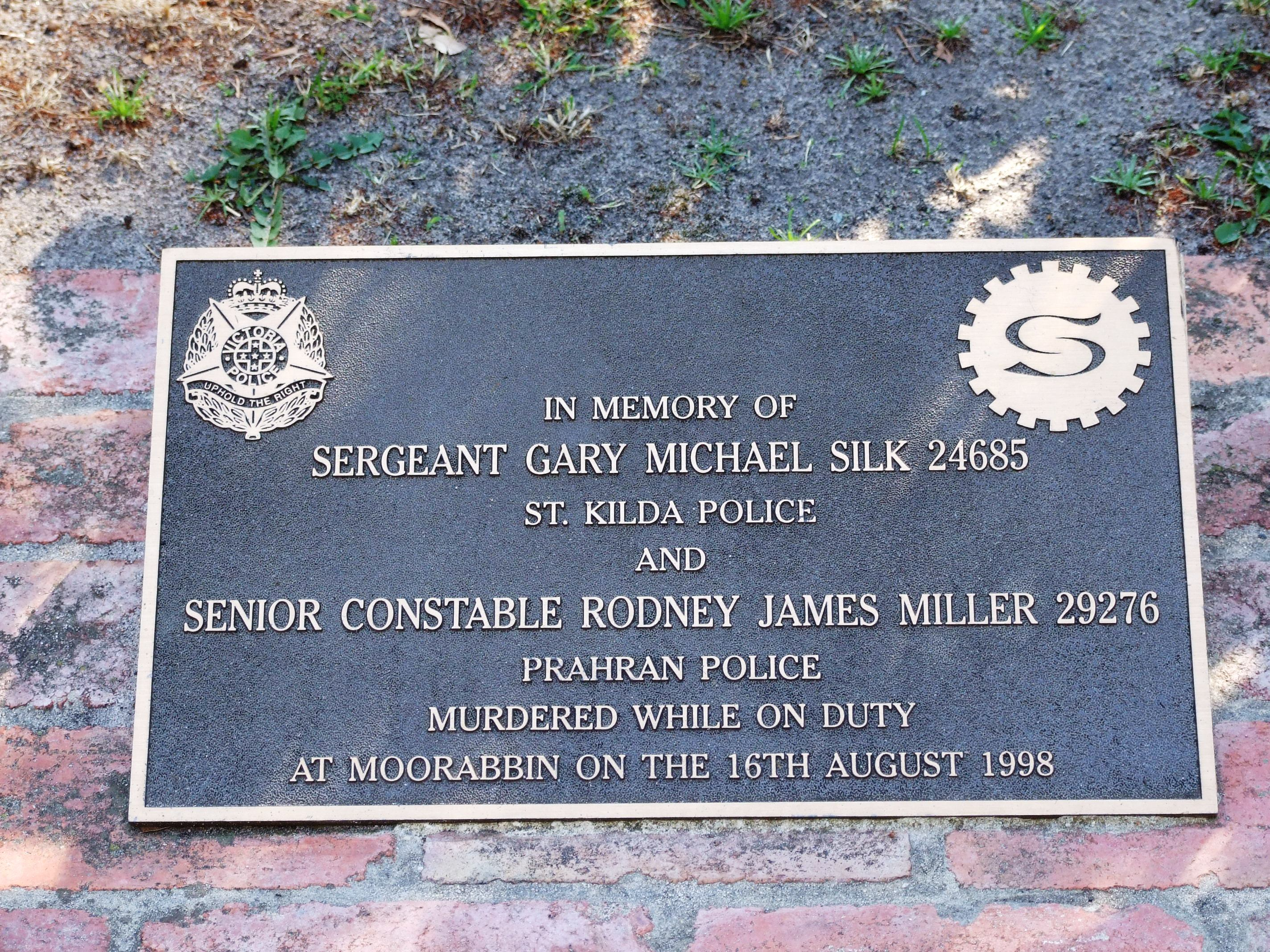
The Silk–Miller memorial plaque in the garden at the Prahran Police Station, Malvern Road, Prahran

Former police officer Joe D'Alo was a member of the task force investigating the shootings. He left the force and wrote a controversial book titled One Down, One Missing (ISBN 1-74066-141-9) about the crime. Assistant Commissioner of Crime at the time, Simon Overland, said of the book,

"Victoria Police does not endorse or support this book. We were only told of the book after it had been written and the deal finalised with the publisher. We're extremely disappointed that a serving police officer would be involved in this publication without the knowledge or support of many of his task force colleagues."

=== Further convictions – Debs ===
In May 2007, Debs was convicted of a third murder of a teenager named Kristy Mary Harty in Beaconsfield Upper, Victoria, around June 1997. Debs was sentenced to a third term of life imprisonment without parole. Debs was also found guilty of the April 1995 murder of Donna Ann Hicks, a mother of three from New South Wales, on 12 December 2011. Debs received another life sentence.

=== Blue Ribbon Cup ===
Australian rules football clubs Hawthorn and St Kilda have played off for the Blue Ribbon Cup since 1999. The cup is dedicated to those who have died while on duty. The best player from the match receives the Silk–Miller Medal. Both men were passionate supporters of the sport. This annual game ensures that the legacy of the two men continues to live on in the lives of Victorians.

== See also ==
- Underbelly Files: Tell Them Lucifer was Here – Tele-movie dramatizing the events and the subsequent investigation to find the killers.
- Walsh Street police shootings, two Victorian Police officers killed execution-style in South Yarra, in 1988.
- Wieambilla police shootings
- Timeline of major crimes in Australia
