= Julie Dodds-Streeton =

Australian judge

The Honourable Justice Julie Anne Dodds-Streeton QC

Reserve Judge of the Supreme Court of Victoria
- Incumbent
- Assumed office 24 November 2015

Judge of the Federal Court of Australia
- In office 1 February 2010 – 1 April 2014

Judge of the Victorian Court of Appeal
- In office 8 August 2007 – 1 February 2010

Judge of the Supreme Court of Victoria
- In office 23 July 2002 – 1 February 2010

Personal details
- Spouse: Roger Arnold Streeton
- Education: University High School, Melbourne; University of Melbourne; Monash University
- Occupation: Judge, lawyer

Julie Anne Dodds-Streeton QC is a Reserve Judge of the Supreme Court of Victoria. She was formerly a judge of the Federal Court of Australia, having served for four years from February 2010. Prior to that, she was a Justice of Appeal in the Supreme Court of Victoria (appointed August 2007), having previously been a Judge of the Trial Division of that Court from 2002.

== Early life and education ==
Dodds-Streeton attended University High School, Melbourne before studying at the University of Melbourne, graduating with a Bachelor of Arts with First Class Honours and then a Bachelor of Laws, also with Honours. She also was awarded a Master of Arts from Monash University.

== Career ==
Dodds-Streeton served her articles with Paveys and was admitted as a solicitor in 1981. She worked as an academic at the Melbourne Law School, where she was a Senior Lecturer in corporate law, real property, intellectual property and equity, before becoming a barrister in 1988, where she read with Joseph Santamaria. practising principally in commercial law. Dodds-Streeton was appointed a Queen's Counsel in 2001. Dodds-Streeton was a member of the Insolvency and Corporate Reconstruction Committee of the Law Council of Australia. Dodds-Streeton was one of the counsel assisting the HIH Royal Commission, where she cross-examined Malcolm Turnbull about his role in the sale of FAI Insurance to HIH Insurance.

=== Supreme Court of Victoria ===
Dodds-Streeton was appointed to the Trial Division of the Supreme Court of Victoria on 23 July 2002, before being elevated to the Court of Appeal on 8 August 2007. Dodds-Streeton joined fellow justices Marilyn Warren and Rosemary Balmford on the court and Victoria's first all female Full Court sat for the admissions ceremony in August 2002.

=== Federal Court ===
On 1 February 2010 Dodds-Streeton was appointed to the Federal Court of Australia, where she served for four years until her retirement on 1 April 2014.

=== Subsequent career ===
Justice Dodds-Streeton was a member of the Expert Advisory Panel established in June 2015 by the Federal Government to oversee the competitive evaluation process of the Future Submarine Program. In August 2014 she was appointed as a panel member of the Commonwealth Bank's Open Advice Review Program, chaired by former High Court judge, the Honourable Justice Ian Callinan AC, QC. The panel was a part of a dispute settlement procedure for customers who received financial advice from the Commonwealth Bank received between 2003 and 2012.

Since 2011 she has held the position of President of the Professional Standards Review Board, Anglican Dioceses of Melbourne, Ballarat and Wangaratta, and since 2017, also Bendigo.

She is a current Senior Fellow, Law School, University of Melbourne (since 2013); Member of the Council of Australian Law Deans - Australian Law Schools Standards Committee (since 2015); and Member and Fellow of the Australian Academy of Law (from 2016).
