= Robert Brooking =

Former judge of the Supreme Court of Victoria

The Honourable Robert Brooking AO, QC

Judge of the Court of Appeal (Vic)
- In office 7 June 1995 – 6 March 2002

Judge of the Supreme Court of Victoria
- In office 22 February 1977 – 6 March 2002

== Career ==
The Honourable Robert Brooking AO, QC was a judge of the Court of Appeal of Victoria from 1995, having been appointed a judge of the Supreme Court of Victoria in 1977. He was also an acting judge of the Supreme Court of the Northern Territory for 6 months in 2000–2001.

Brooking was admitted to practice as a solicitor in 1954 and was appointed a Queen's Counsel in 1969.

Brooking retired in 2002 after serving as a judge for 25 years.

In 2003 he was made an Officer of the Order of Australia "For service to the judiciary, particularly through the Victorian Court of Appeal, to the law in the areas of tenancy, building law and arbitration, and to the community".

== Publications ==
- "McRae and Anor v Commonwealth Disposals Commission and Ors" (PDF). (1954) 6 Res Judicate 3.
- "Causer v Browne" (PDF). (1954) 6 Res Judicate 17.
- "Marcus Clarke & Co Ltd v The Commonwealth" (PDF). (1954) 6 Res Judicate 247.
- "Re Lilley" (PDF). (1954) 6 Res Judicate 395.
- Building Contracts: The Law and Practice Relating to Building and Engineering Agreements. Butterworths. 1974. ISBN 9780409434590.
- Landlord and Tenant. Butterworths. 1959.
- "Luntz: Assessment of Damages For Personal Injury And Death" (PDF). (1974) 9(4) Melbourne University Law Review 795.
- "Reflections and Reminiscences of a Building Judge" (PDF). (2002) 85 Australian Construction Law Newsletter 5.

== See also ==
- List of Judges of the Supreme Court of Victoria
