= Maree Kennedy =

Australian judge

The Honourable Justice Maree Evelyn Kennedy

Judge of the Supreme Court of Victoria
- Incumbent
- Assumed office 25 July 2016

Judge of the County Court of Victoria
- In office 1 May 2007 – 24 July 2016

Personal details
- Education: Monash Law School
- Occupation: Judge, lawyer

Maree Evelyn Kennedy is a judge of the Court of Appeal of the Supreme Court of Victoria. She was appointed to the Court of Appeal in December 2020.

After graduating from the Monash Law School, she completed articles with Arthur Robinson & Hedderwicks (now Allens) and was admitted to practice in 1987.

Kennedy began her legal career as an Associate to Justice John Keely at the Federal Court of Australia. She was called to the Victorian Bar in 1990, where she read with Stephen Kaye. She was appointed as a Senior Counsel in 2002.

In 2007, Kennedy was appointed a Judge of the County Court of Victoria, where she helped establish the Court's commercial list.

Justice Kennedy took up her appointment to the Supreme Court on 25 July 2016, and sat as a judge of the Commercial Court. She was appointed to the Court of Appeal in December 2020.
