= John David Phillips =

Judge of the Supreme Court of Victoria

The Honourable John Phillips KC

Judge of the Supreme Court of Victoria
- In office 22 May 1990 – 22 May 2004
- Preceded by: New seat
- Succeeded by: Elizabeth Hollingworth

Personal details
- Born: 1936 (age 89–90)
- Education: Scotch College, Melbourne
- Alma mater: University of Melbourne

John David Phillips KC (born 1936) is an Australian lawyer and judge who served on the Supreme Court of Victoria from 1990 to 2004.

== Early life ==
Phillips was born in 1936. He was educated at Scotch College in Melbourne, Victoria and obtained his high school matriculation in 1953. He left his school as equal Dux. Phillips went on to study law at the University of Melbourne, graduating with Honours. He also won the Supreme Court Prize during his studies at university, and served as one of the inaugural editors of the Melbourne University Law Review.

He left university to undertake articles to become a solicitor of the Supreme Court. He undertook this with William Clarke in the firm of W.J. Clarke & Co. That firm was later incorporated into the firm of Purvis Clarke Richards, and which is now part of the national legal firm Gadens Lawyers.

== Legal career ==
Whilst undertaking his articles, Phillips was the founding co-editor of the Melbourne University Law Review in 1957. The Review had developed from the earlier publications “Res Judicatae “ published by the Law School in Melbourne University and ‘A Magazine of Legal and General Literature’ by the then Articled Clerks' Society of Victoria.

After completing his articles, Phillips was admitted to practice as a solicitor of the Supreme Court of Victoria on 2 March 1959. During his time as a solicitor, he worked as a judge's associate to Justice Douglas Menzies of the High Court of Australia.

Phillips read with Richard Newton of Eagle Star Chambers, who was to become a justice of the Supreme Court. In 1961 Phillips was called to the Bar, and set up chambers in the newly opened Owen Dixon Chambers in Melbourne. He specialized in commercial law, equity and probate law. During this time, he served as the Bar's representative on the Supreme Court Rules Committee for two and a half years. During his time at the bar, he earned himself the moniker of “Equity Jack”, a reference to his specialization as a barrister in the equity jurisdiction of the court. The term was apparently coined by the chamber's clerk to distinguish him from the other J Phillips who specialized in criminal law. The other Phillips was to later become the Chief Justice of Victoria.

Phillips married his wife Eva in 1965 and took silk in 1977 as a Queens Counsel. High Court judge and former Supreme Court judge Kenneth Hayne was a notable person who read under Phillips.

== Judicial career ==
Phillips was appointed to the Supreme Court of Victoria in 1990. In 1995 he was appointed as one of the first judges to the newly created Court of Appeal as a judge of appeal. This court acted as a permanent appeal court for the State of Victoria. Phillips also was appointed to the court's Rule Committee. This committee was responsible for drafting and issuing rules relating to the procedure of the Supreme Court. In later years, Phillips became the chair of the committee for several years.

Phillips dealt with many cases during his judicial career. Two cases attracted media attention. In 2003, Phillips was a member of the appeal court which imposed what is believed to be the highest sentence imposed in Victoria for incest. The court imposed a sixteen-year imprisonment with a minimum term of thirteen and a half years. The court increased the previous sentence by four years for a man who abused six children in his care for more than 16 years.

In the same year, Phillips was also a member of the appeal court which refused a prosecution appeal against the decision of a County Court that allowed four young men to escape convictions for armed robbery. The appeal court concluded that the trial judge had properly exercised his discretion in not convicting the four men. In Victoria, armed robbery carries a prison term of up to 25 years. However, the appeal court warned that "in all but the most exceptional case" armed robbers should expect to be convicted.

Phillips retired from the court in May 2004 as a permanent judge as his had reached the statutory retirement age for judges. He returned in October 2004 to the Supreme Court as a reserve judge. He retired as a reserve judge in 2005.

== Support for independence of the judiciary ==
Phillips' retirement speech generated debate in Victoria on judicial independence. In the Australian experience, government is separated into three branches, the executive, legislative and judicial branches. Each branch is independent of the others, and is recognised in the Australian Constitution at the federal level. Phillips on his retirement was critical of the intrusion of the executive into the work of the courts, being the judicial branch. For example, the Supreme Court was referred to as "Business Unit 19" by the Victorian Government. Phillips did not suggest that the Victorian Government would attempt to influence directly a decision of the court. However, there appeared to be "What is evolving ...a perception of the court as some sort of unit of functionary within the Department of Justice”.

Phillips was also critical of the Victorian Government's decision to appoint acting judges from the ranks of barristers, solicitors and legal academics despite sustained criticism from judges, magistrates and lawyers. Traditionally, judges are appointed permanently so that there no scope for a judge to be removed because a decision is made that a government may not like. This enables judges to act without fear or favour. Acting judges allow a government to appoint short term judges whose appointments do not need to be renewed. This may lead to a perception that acting judges will not make decisions that are not pleasing to government in fear of not being reappointed. As Phillips noted, "a court … will rarely, if ever, be popular with politicians”. Phillips also referred to the previous Victorian government's decision not to allow that the court's chief administrator to be appointed by the governor. Instead, the administrator is appointed by the government and answerable to the Department of Justice.

Journalist Richard Ackland has criticised this general argument made by judges. Ackland argues that the courts' view of independence are inflated and unrealistic. He reasons that courts cannot be co-equal with elected governments, and that courts, like other government bodies, need to compete for funds to provide services to the public. He sums up this view by saying 'What on earth are they on about?'

Phillips is not alone in his criticism of government. He received support in 2006 when retiring judge William Ormiston agreed with Phillips’ comments. Chief Justice Marilyn Warren responded to the criticism by saying that "bureaucrats did not tell her what to do". Warren noted that whilst there were disagreements between her and the government from time to time, the judges run the courts, not public servants. Warren said "The court, as part of our structure of government, is independent. As part of Victoria's constitutional arrangements, the Supreme Court is the third arm of government."

== Sources ==
- “Supreme Court of Victoria : the Honourable Justice Phillips” Victorian Bar News (132) Autumn 2005 pp 48–50.
- Who's Who Australia 2007.
- Speech – Supreme Court of Victoria – 17 March 2005

http://www.supremecourt.vic.gov.au/CA256902000FE154/Lookup/Speeches2005/$file/SpeechFarewellJDPhillips17March05.pdf
