= Simon Whelan =

Australian judge (born 1954)

Simon Paul Whelan (born 20 September 1954) is a judge of the Court of Appeal in the Supreme Court of Victoria in the Australian state of Victoria. He was educated at Xavier College, Kew. He is the son of the late Desmond Whelan, the inaugural Chief Judge of the County Court of Victoria.

Whelan was appointed to the Court of Appeal in 2012. He was previously appointed to the Trial Division of the Supreme Court in 2004.

Whelan served from 2008 to 2013 as the Chairman of the Adult Parole Board of Victoria, until replaced by Justice Elizabeth Curtain.

He was a member of the Coodabeen Champions radio show beginning with its inception on community radio station 3RRR.

== See also ==
- List of Judges of the Supreme Court of Victoria
