= Paul Bongiorno =

Australian political journalist and commentator

Paul Bongiorno AM
- Born: Paul Damian Bongiorno; 1944 (age 81–82)
- Occupations: Political journalist; TV talk show host; radio personality; political commentator; former Catholic priest
- Years active: Television 1974–present
- Relatives: Bernard Bongiorno (second cousin)

Paul Damian Bongiorno AM (born 1944) is an Australian political journalist and commentator.

== Personal life ==
Bongiorno grew up in Ballarat, Victoria, and was educated by the Christian Brothers at St Patrick's College and Drummond Street in Ballarat. He told ABC radio in 2015: "I was inspired by what I heard and by the lives of men—both priests and brothers—by the ideals and the values that they had in terms of social justice and human welfare and well-being and belief in God, to go off and become a Catholic priest." Bongiorno later worked as a Catholic priest. He holds a master's degree in theology from the Pontifical Urban University in Rome.

He is now married with two daughters and is a second cousin of Bernard Bongiorno, a former justice of the Supreme Court of Victoria.

== Career ==
Bongiorno started in television at the Seven Network in Melbourne in 1974, moved to WIN TV in Wollongong later that year, then moved to Network Ten in Brisbane in 1978 as a reporter and, for a time, a weather presenter. In Brisbane, he won four Walkley Awards for investigative journalism as well as reporting state politics and writing for The Bulletin magazine. He has been with Ten's Canberra bureau since 1988. In November 2010, he was appointed national affairs editor for Ten News with Hugh Riminton, now the political editor and bureau chief in Canberra.

A veteran political broadcaster, he regularly appeared on Ten's news and weekday programs. He is also a regular commentator on radio.

Bongiorno hosted Ten's national Sunday morning show, Meet the Press, from 1996 until 2012.

In June 2014, he took voluntary redundancy from Network Ten. In August of that year he became a regular contributor to The Saturday Paper.

== Political views ==
Bongiorno is a regular contributor on ABC's RN Breakfast and the national newspaper The Saturday Paper.

=== Whitlam government ===
He describes Sir John Kerr (the Governor-General who sacked Labor Prime Minister Gough Whitlam) as a "venal deceptive man", and the senior judges who advised him as "lacking moral compass". He believes the reserve powers of the governor-general should be scrapped.

=== Abbott-Turnbull government ===
On Radio National, Bongiorno likened the conservative Liberal-National Abbott government to a "dictatorship". He describes Tony Abbott as "famous for saying the exact opposite of what reality is". He describes Liberal Prime Minister Malcolm Turnbull as the "best thing [the Liberal-National Party Coalition] has going for it".

=== Sky News ===
In a 2018 tweet, Bongiorno, then an ABC radio political correspondent, defended the number of left commentators on the ABC and criticised Sky News for having too many conservatives by tweeting that the national broadcaster had as many "lefties" as there are "righties" on Sky "after dark panels and that includes 'Uncle Tom' lefties craving relevance". Bongiorno did not acknowledge the taxpayer funding and requirement for the ABC to be impartial, which was criticised by several Sky News hosts and panellists. Aboriginal Sky News commentator and former Labor Party president Warren Mundine objected to the use of the racist epithet "Uncle Tom", and called the ABC "hypocritical and disgraceful" for not criticising the remark.

== Honours ==
In the January 2014 Australia Day Honours list, Bongiorno was made a Member of the Order of Australia (AM) "for significant service to the print and broadcast media as a journalist, political commentator and editor".
