= Melanie Sloss =

Australian judge

The Honourable Justice Melanie Sloss

Judge of the Supreme Court of Victoria
- Incumbent
- Assumed office 30 July 2013

Personal details
- Occupation: Judge, lawyer

Melanie Sloss is an Australian Judge in the Trial Division of the Supreme Court of Victoria and sits as a judge of the Commercial Court.

Sloss was first admitted to practice in Western Australia in 1980 and in Victoria in 1985. She was appointed as Senior Counsel in 2002 and served as junior vice-chairman, senior vice-chairman and chair of the Victorian Bar Council. Justice Sloss took up her appointment to the Supreme Court on 30 July 2013.
