= Michael McDonald =

Michael or Mike McDonald may refer to:

== Arts and entertainment ==
- Michael McDonald (musician) (born 1952), American singer
- Michael McDonald (costume designer) (1963–2024), American costume designer
- Michael McDonald (comedian) (born 1964), American actor-comedian

== Sports ==
- Mike McDonald (footballer) (born 1950), Scottish footballer
- Mike McDonald (American football) (born 1958), American football player
- Michael McDonald (kickboxer) (born 1965), Canadian kickboxer
- Michael McDonald (basketball) (born 1969), American basketball player
- Michael McDonald (runner) (born 1975), Jamaican runner
- Michael McDonald (fighter) (born 1991), American mixed martial artist
- Michael McDonald (rugby union) (born 1999), Australian rugby union player

== Others ==
- Michael Cassius McDonald (1839–1907), American crime boss and political boss
- Michael P. McDonald (born 1967), American political scientist
- Michael McDonald (poker player) (born 1989), Canadian poker player
- Michael Phillip McDonald, Australian judge

== See also ==
- Michael MacDonald (disambiguation)
