= 2020 Eastern Freeway truck crash =

Traffic accident in Victoria, Australia

Eastern Freeway crash
- Location of the Eastern Freeway truck crash
- Date: 22 April 2020
- Time: Around 5pm (AEST)
- Location: Kew East, Victoria, Australia; 37°47′19″S 145°03′20″E
- Type: Rear-end collision
- Cause: Drug–impaired driving
- Filmed by: Richard Pusey
- Deaths: 4
- Convicted: Mohinder Singh; Richard Pusey

On 22 April 2020, a truck driver under the influence of drugs, Mohinder Singh, crashed his truck into a private vehicle and two police cars on the Eastern Freeway in the suburb of Kew East, Australia, killing four police officers who were on routine highway patrol. Prior to the incident, the officers had pulled over driver Richard Pusey for speeding in his Porsche. After the truck hit the officers, Pusey filmed them for several minutes with vulgar commentary as they lay dying, before fleeing.

The crash was the gravest single loss of police life in Victoria Police's history. Justice Paul Coghlan stated that the crash had "shocked the public conscience".

== Incident ==
Victoria Police Commissioner Graham Ashton stated that two officers stopped a Porsche 911 alleged to have been travelling at 140 km/h around 17:00 on 22 April, a Wednesday afternoon. The two police officers drug tested the 41-year-old male driver, Richard Pusey. When he tested positive for drugs the officers decided to impound his vehicle and called two further officers to the scene. Just after they arrived, a refrigerated truck ploughed into the four officers. Pusey was not hit, as he was urinating at the side of the road. He filmed the dying officers whilst giving an expletive-laden commentary.

CCTV footage showed the truck straddling and drifting across lanes on the freeway 10 minutes before the incident. Ashton said, "The truck itself appears to have moved from one of the traffic lanes in the freeway into the emergency lane and has travelled a short distance in the emergency lane at around about 100km/h and slammed into the rear of the highway patrol vehicle." Constable Lynette Taylor, 60; senior constable Kevin King, 50; and constables Glen Humphris, 32, and Josh Prestney, 28, died at the scene.

== Overview ==
=== Mohinder Singh ===
Singh, 48, was sleep deprived and under the influence of methamphetamine when he crashed his 19-tonne Volvo FM truck into the officers who had pulled over driver Richard Pusey. Data showed that Singh did not try to brake until it was too late. Singh was using and trafficking drugs before the crash occurred. He had been delusional in the months before the crash, apparently describing hallucinations. He was seen wailing at the crash scene and had a medical episode, and was taken to hospital under police guard. The court was told that Singh had slept for only five hours in the 72 hours before the incident, but felt obliged to continue his work. Older court hearings revealed that Singh suffered from anxiety and depression. Lawyer Steven Pica said Singh was "distressed and saddened" at his actions. Singh pleaded guilty in the Supreme Court of Victoria to four counts of culpable driving causing death, and six other charges including trafficking drugs including methamphetamine and cannabis, possessing drugs, and dealing with proceeds of crime. He was sentenced on 14 April 2021 to 22 years in prison with a non-parole period of 18 years and 6 months. On 18 August 2022, the Court of Appeal reduced the initial jail term to 18 years and 6 months with a non-parole period of 14 years and 6 months.

=== Richard Pusey ===
Richard Pusey, 42, a former mortgage broker, was pulled over by Senior Constable Lynette Taylor and First Constable Glen Humphris for speeding at 149 km/h. An oral drug test on Pusey confirmed he had MDMA and cannabis in his system and the officers called for backup to impound his car. Senior Constable Kevin King and Constable Joshua Prestney arrived half an hour later. About a minute after their arrival, the four were standing in the emergency lane while Pusey urinated off the side of the road when Singh's truck struck them. Pusey was not hit and used his mobile phone to film the scene, zooming in on the injured officers, saying "That is fucking justice, that is fucking amazing" as they lay dying on the ground. He said, "all I wanted was to go home and have my sushi and now you've fucked my fucking car". Pusey continued vulgar commentary while filming for more than three minutes before fleeing on foot and sharing the video on Facebook. He was charged with two counts of perverting the course of justice, driving at a dangerous speed, reckless conduct endangering life, destruction of evidence, and not providing assistance after an incident. Pusey was jailed for 10 months. In November 2021, Pusey attached graphic photos of the dying police officers to a complaint he sent to the Australian Financial Complaints Authority. He was charged and found guilty of using a carriage service to cause offence, for which he was sentenced to a further 10 months in jail.

== Truck company ==
After an 18-month investigation, the truck company Connect Logistics was charged with category one and two offences under heavy vehicle national law. The two owners of the company appeared in Parramatta Court on 28 September 2021. Category one offences have a maximum penalty of $300,000 and five years jail for an individual and $3m for a corporation. Category two offences carry a maximum penalty of $150,000 for an individual and $1.5 million for a corporation. Singh's boss, Simiona Tuteru, was charged with more than 70 offences in relation to the fatal incident. The police allege that Tuteru should have not allowed Singh to drive on the day of the accident due to his fatigue. Compliance operations after the incident resulted in several vehicles being issued with infringements, and two heavy vehicles with major defects.

In October 2022, prosecutors dropped manslaughter accusations against trucking boss Simiona Tuteru, who was charged with four counts of manslaughter. Rather, he faced four heavy vehicle charges. In March 2023 all remaining charges against Tuteru were put on hold permanently, with the judge describing the case as a misuse of the court process and criticising the prosecution for acting oppressively and unfairly in the handling of the case.

== Tributes ==
On the day after the crash, Victoria police, including the staff department, gathered at the Victoria Police Academy on the site's parade ground to pay tribute to the deceased officers, with a minute's silence. Flowers were also placed at the Boroondara police station, which is proximate to the crash site. In a news conference, Australian Prime Minister Scott Morrison thanked Victoria police, whilst offering his condolences. Melbourne's mayor, Sally Capp, organised for the flags to be raised at half-mast, and as well as the Melbourne Town Hall to display in blue as a gesture of respect. Police forces from the country and as well as those overseas paid tribute to the victims.

== See also ==
- Cardross road crash
- List of disasters in Australia by death toll
