= John Winneke =

Australian judge (1938–2019)

The Honourable John Winneke AC RFD QC

President of the Victorian Court of Appeal
- In office 7 June 1995 – 15 July 2005

Personal details
- Born: 19 March 1938
- Died: 4 April 2019 (aged 81)
- Occupation: Judge, barrister

John Spence Winneke, AC, RFD, QC (19 March 1938 – 4 April 2019) was a judge of the Supreme Court of Victoria and President of the Court of Appeal of the Supreme Court of Victoria, which is the highest ranking court in the Australian state of Victoria.

== Early life ==
John Spence Winneke was the son of Sir Henry Winneke who was Solicitor-General for the State of Victoria, Chief Justice of Victoria, and Governor of Victoria. John Winneke's grandfather, Henry Christian Winneke, was a judge of the County Court of Victoria.

Winneke was educated at Scotch College and the University of Melbourne, where he was a Member of the Melbourne University Law Review. When he completed his legal studies, he completed his articles with Josh Shaw of the law offices of Middleton McEarchern Shaw and Birch. He was admitted to practice as a solicitor on 1 March 1962. He was called to the Victorian Bar in 1962. He was appointed a Queen's Counsel in 1976.

Winneke was also an outstanding Australian rules football player, who was ruckman in Hawthorn's inaugural VFL Premiership side in 1961, playing a total of 50 games for the club.

== Australian Defence Force ==
Winneke was commissioned as a commander in the Royal Australian Navy. He was also appointed a Defence Force Magistrate and held an appointment as a Reviewing Officer under the Defence Force Discipline Act.

== Noted cases ==
In 1970, Winneke was counsel assisting William Kaye in the "abortion graft inquiry", which inquired into allegations of corruption involving members of the Victorian Homicide Squad.

In 1981, he was appointed as a Royal Commissioner by the Commonwealth of Australia and the State of Victoria to inquire into the affairs of the Builders Labourers Federation.

He appeared as senior counsel for Michael and Lindy Chamberlain before Justice Morling in the Royal Commission into their convictions for the murder of their infant daughter, Azaria Chamberlain. He appeared as counsel in the Royal Commission into the Westgate Bridge collapse, in the River Derwent Bridge Inquiry, and in the Housing Commission of Victoria Inquiry.

== Judicial career ==
Winneke was appointed on 7 June 1995 as a judge of the Supreme Court of Victoria and as the first President of the Court of Appeal of the Supreme Court of Victoria when the Court of Appeal was established that year. He was appointed as the acting Chief Justice for a brief period in 2003. He retired from the bench on 15 July 2005.

== Honours ==
Winneke was awarded an Officer of the Order of Australia (AO) in 1999, and in 2004 was upgraded to the Companion of the Order of Australia (AC). Both were awarded for his significant contributions to the judiciary in Victoria.

== See also ==
- Judiciary of Australia
- List of Judges of the Supreme Court of Victoria
