= Melbourne University Law Review =

- Discipline: Law
- Language: English
- Edited by: Olivia Mann, Lucy Roberts-Lovell and Alex Robertson

Publication details
- Former names: The Summons; Res Judicatae
- History: 1957–present
- Publisher: Melbourne University Law Review Association (Australia)
- Frequency: Triannually

Standard abbreviations
- Bluebook: Melb. U. L. Rev.
- ISO 4: Melb. Univ. Law Rev.

Indexing
- ISSN: 0025-8938
- LCCN: sf84007069
- OCLC no.: 60630207

Links
- Journal homepage; Online access

The Melbourne University Law Review is a triannual law journal published by a student group at Melbourne Law School covering all areas of law. It is one of the student-run law journals at the University of Melbourne and is widely regarded as Australia's leading generalist law journal. Students who have completed at least one semester of law are eligible to apply for membership of the editorial board. Applicants are assessed on the basis of their performance in a practical exercise, academic aptitude, and proofreading and editing skills. The 2026 editors are Olivia Mann, Lucy Roberts-Lovell and Alex Robertson.

Occasionally, the journal produces a symposium issue devoted to a particular aspect of law. Past symposium issues have focused on the centenary of the federation of Australia, contemporary human rights in Australia, and tort law. The Review's alumni include two High Court Justices, three Solicitors-General, five Federal Court judges and at least six Supreme Court judges.

== Rankings ==
The journal has been awarded an A* ranking by the Australian Business Law Deans Council.

== History ==
=== The Summons ===
The first periodical published at the Melbourne Law School was The Summons. It appeared with the subtitle A Magazine of Legal and General Literature and was published by the Articled Law Clerks' Society of Victoria between 1891 and 1903. It was a yellow-covered sixteen-page journal depicting an angel with a trumpet on its cover and served as more of a current affairs magazine than an academic journal, publishing reports of moots and discussing topical issues, which at the time included the fusion of the two branches of the Victorian legal profession and the admission of women.

=== Res Judicatae ===
In 1935, the students of the Faculty of Law established Res Judicatae — roughly translated as "things that have been judicially adjudicated on" — which was intended to provide a forum for discussion and debate among students of the law. Published by the Law Students' Society of Victoria, it focused on legal journalism.

Notable publications include C S Lewis on 'The Humanitarian Theory of Punishment', Owen Dixon on 'De Facto Officers', H V Evatt on 'Amending the Constitution', John Latham on 'The Law Student', and the re-printing of Frank Gavan Duffy's poem, 'A Dream of Fair Judges' (originally published in The Summons).

=== Melbourne University Law Review ===
In 1957, Zelman Cowen (then dean of the faculty and later governor-general of Australia) re-established the journal along the model of the Harvard Law Review and renamed it the Melbourne University Law Review. In line with prevailing American practice, top ranking law students were invited to become members of the editorial board. In 1998, the number of issues published each year was increased from two to three.

== Alumni ==
Notable alumni of the Melbourne University Law Review include:

High Court
- Kenneth Hayne, former Justice of the High Court of Australia, editor 1966
- Keith Aickin, former Justice of the High Court of Australia, editor 1939 (Res Judicatae)

Federal Court

- Susan Kenny, Justice of the Federal Court of Australia, editor 1976
- Mark Moshinsky, Justice of the Federal Court of Australia, editor 1987
- John Middleton, Justice of the Federal Court of Australia, assistant editor 1974
- Alan Goldberg AO, former Justice of the Federal Court of Australia, editor 1961
- Ronald Sackville, former Justice of the Federal Court of Australia, editor 1962

Supreme Court

- Stephen McLeish, Justice of the Supreme Court of Victoria, editor 1984
- Emilios Kyrou, Justice of the Supreme Court of Victoria, assistant editor 1981
- Philip Mandie, former Justice of the Supreme Court of Victoria, editor 1964
- William Ormiston, former Justice of the Supreme Court of Victoria, business manager 1957
- Frank Callaway, former Justice of the Supreme Court of Victoria, editor 1967
- John Winneke, former Justice of the Supreme Court of Victoria, President of the Court of Appeal, member 1958–60
- John Phillips, former Justice of the Supreme Court of Victoria, editor 1957

Solicitors-General

- Stephen Donaghue, Solicitor-General of Australia, editor 1995
- Gavan Griffith, Solicitor-General of Australia, editor 1962
- Stephen McLeish, Solicitor-General of Victoria, editor 1984

Barristers

- Allan Myers, Queen's Counsel, editor 1969
- Alan Archibald, Queen's Counsel, case note editor 1967
- Neil Young, Queen's Counsel, assistant editor 1973
- Robert Richter, Queen's Counsel, editor 1966
- Jason Pizer, Queen's Counsel, editor 1992
- Kristen Walker, Queen's Counsel, editor 1991
- Luke Livingston, Senior Counsel, editor 2001

Politicians

- Gareth Evans, former Commonwealth Minister for Foreign Affairs, member 1965–6
- Lindsay Tanner, former Minister for Finance and Deregulation, member 1979–81
- Robert Clark, former Victorian Attorney-General, member 1981

Academics

- Arie Freiberg, Dean of Monash University Faculty of Law, member
- Hilary Charlesworth, law professor at University of Melbourne, editor 1979
- Simon Chesterman, Dean of National University of Singapore Faculty of Law
- Allan Myers, Chancellor of the University of Melbourne, editor 1969
- Anne Twomey, Professor of Constitutional Law at University of Sydney, editor 1988
- Kim Rubenstein, Professor of Constitutional and Administrative Law at Australian National University, editor 1987
- Dr Jim Minifie, economist at the Grattan Institute, editor 1989

Writers

- Anna Funder, author of Stasiland, editor 1991

== Australian Guide to Legal Citation ==
In collaboration with the Melbourne Journal of International Law, the journal publishes the Australian Guide to Legal Citation.

== See also ==
- Melbourne Journal of International Law
