= Susan Kenny =

Australian judge

The Honourable Justice Susan Coralie Kenny AM

Judge of the Federal Court of Australia
- In office 16 October 1998 – 29 November 2023

Judge of the Court of Appeal (Vic)
- In office 25 July 1997 – 15 October 1998

Personal details
- Born: 29 November 1953 (age 72) Oxford, United Kingdom
- Children: 3
- Education: University of Melbourne (BA, LLB); Magdalen College, Oxford (DPhil)
- Occupation: Judge, Lawyer

Susan Coralie Kenny AM (born 29 November 1953) is a reserve judge of the Supreme Court of Victoria, a former Judge of the Federal Court of Australia, and before that was a Judge of the Supreme Court of Victoria, where she was the first woman to serve on the Court of Appeal.

== Early life and education ==
Kenny was born in Oxford in 1953. She attended various schools in the United States of America and Australia, completing her secondary education at Methodist Ladies' College, Melbourne. Kenny studied at the University of Melbourne, graduating in 1978 with a Bachelor of Arts and a Bachelor of Laws, winning the Dwight's Prize for history and sharing the Supreme Court Prize for law. She was an editor of the Melbourne University Law Review in 1975. In 1985 Kenny was awarded the Menzies Scholarship in Law, which together with a grant from the Queen Elizabeth II Silver Jubilee Trust enabled her to attended Magdalen College at the University of Oxford, completing her doctorate in 1988 which was supervised by John Finnis.

== Career ==
Kenny was associate to Sir Ninian Stephen, then a High Court judge in 1979 and 1980. From 1981 she practised as a barrister, working in constitutional, public, commercial and tax law. Kenny appeared in notable cases including the Tasmanian Dams case, War Crimes case, and in the International Court of Justice in East Timor (Portugal v Australia), and Nauru v Australia. Kenny was a President of the Administrative Review Council from 9 February 1993 to 30 September 1995. She was appointed a Queen's Counsel in 1996.

=== Supreme Court of Victoria ===
Kenny was appointed a Judge of the Court of Appeal of the Supreme Court of Victoria sitting between 25 July 1997 and 15 October 1998, the first woman to be appointed to this court. After her retirement from the Federal Court in November 2023, she rejoined the Court of Appeal as a reserve judge from July 2024.

=== Federal Court ===
Kenny was sworn in as a judge of the Federal Court on 16 October 1998. In November 2010, she was appointed a presidential member of the Administrative Appeals Tribunal. As a judge Kenny hears the wide range of matters before the Federal Court, both as a trial judge and on appeal, including workplace relations (AWU v BHP Iron Ore) employment law (Walker v Citigroup Global Markets Pty Ltd) intellectual property (McCormick & Co Inc v McCormick, D'Arcy v Myriad Genetics Inc anti-discrimination law (Rainsford v Victoria, and AB v Registrar of Births, Deaths & Marriages) migration appeals (ALA15 v Minister for Immigration and Border Protection) environmental law (Alpine Grazing Trial case) and taxation law (Haritos v Commissioner of Taxation)).

=== Australian Electoral Commission ===
On 17 September 2020 she was appointed Chairperson of the Australian Electoral Commission for a 5-year term.

== Published articles ==
- 'Constitutional Fact Ascertainment' (1990) 1 Public Law Review 134 LawCite record.
- 'Important changes to migration review', in Major Changes to Immigration Law (Leo Cussen Institute, Melbourne, 1993) ISBN 0-86394-323-3
- "Interveners and Amici Curiae in the High Court" (PDF). (1998) 20 Adelaide Law Review 159.
- Kenny, S. (2003). "The High Court on Constitutional Law: The 2002 Term". University of New South Wales Law Journal. (2003) 26 University of New South Wales Law Journal 210.
- Kenny, Susan (2015). "Federal Courts and Australian National Identity". Melbourne University Law Review. (2015) 38 Melbourne University Law Review 996, special issue in memory of Sir Zelman Cowen
- "Speeches by Justice Kenny". Federal Court.

== See also ==
- List of Judges of the Federal Court of Australia
- List of Judges of the Supreme Court of Victoria
