= Winneke =

Winneke is a surname. Notable people with the surname include:

- Henry Winneke (1908–1985), Australian judge
- John Winneke (1938–2019), Australian judge
- Nathan Winneke, American bassist
