= Tadgell =

Tadgell is a surname of Old English origin. Notable people with the surname include:

- Lady Juliet Tadgell (born 1935), British heiress, race horse breeder, and landowner
- Robert Tadgell, Australian Supreme Court justice
