= John Batt =

Australian jurist

John Michael Batt AM (born 22 September 1935) is a former Australian jurist who was a Court of Appeal justice at the Supreme Court of Victoria. He retired from the court in 2005, and prior to his judgeship had served as the Bar representative on the Chief Justice's Supreme Court Rules Committee.

In 2016 Batt was appointed a Member of the Order of Australia for significant service to the law and to the judiciary in Victoria, to legal scholarship, and to the Anglican Church of Australia.
