= Karin Emerton =

Australian judge

The Honourable Justice Karin Leigh Emerton

President of the Supreme Court of Victoria Court of Appeal
- Incumbent
- Assumed office 13 October 2009 (Justice) 22 July 2022 (President)

Personal details
- Born: 6 May 1957 (age 68) Geneva, Switzerland
- Education: University of Sydney; University of New South Wales; Sorbonne
- Occupation: Judge, lawyer

Karin Leigh Emerton (born 6 May 1957) is a justice of the Court of Appeal of the Supreme Court of Victoria in Australia, serving as the current President of the Court of Appeal.

Emerton is a graduate of the University of Sydney and University of New South Wales in Australia, and completed a doctorate at the Sorbonne.

Emerton worked as a solicitor at Blake Dawson Waldron from 1989; during her time there she was seconded to the Victorian Attorney-General's Department. Emerton was called to the Victorian Bar in 1993 and was appointed Senior Counsel in 2007. She worked for the Victorian Government as Crown Counsel (Advisings) between 2007 and 2009.

Emerton was appointed as a judge of the Trial Division of the Supreme Court on 13 October 2009. She was elevated to the Court of Appeal on 10 July 2018. She was appointed the first female President of the Court of Appeal for Victoria in June 2022.

A portrait of Emerton, Woman and pipe, by Merilyn Fairskye was a finalist for the 1987 Archibald Prize.
