= Michael Sifris =

Judge of the Supreme Court of Victoria

Michael Sifris is a former Trials Division justice of the Supreme Court of Victoria. In his career, he practised as a solicitor in both South Africa and Australia. He is a former partner of Schwarz, Goldblatt, Bloch & Gross, and is a graduate of the graduate law program at the University of Melbourne.

Sifris was admitted to legal practice in Victoria in 1987, joined the Bar in 1989, and was appointed Senior Counsel in 2002. In 2010 he was appointed to the Supreme Court of Victoria. After serving 13 years on the Court, including his final three years on the Court of Appeal, Sifris returned to the Bar, where he now undertakes mediations, arbitrations, commissions, expert determinations, and special court references.

Sifris retired from the Supreme Court of Victoria in December 2023.
