= Joseph Santamaria =

Australian judge (1948–2026)

The Honourable Joseph Santamaria KC

Judge of the Court of Appeal, Supreme Court of Victoria
- In office 20 August 2013 – 14 July 2018

Personal details
- Born: Joseph Gerard Santamaria; 14 July 1948 Melbourne, Victoria, Australia
- Died: 23 July 2026 (aged 78) Melbourne, Victoria, Australia
- Education: University of Melbourne, University of Oxford
- Occupation: Judge, lawyer, academic

Joseph Gerard Santamaria KC (14 July 1948 – 23 July 2026) was an Australian jurist and a judge of the Court of Appeal of the Supreme Court of Victoria. He was appointed to the Court of Appeal in August 2013 and retired in July 2018. He was a Senior Fellow in the Juris Doctor programme at the Melbourne Law School.

== Education and career ==
Santamaria attended St Patrick's College, East Melbourne. He graduated with a Bachelor of Arts and a Bachelor of Laws with honours from the University of Melbourne. He later attended University College, Oxford, where he graduated with a Bachelor of Civil Law and a Bachelor of Letters.

He was admitted to legal practice in 1973. In 1977, he took up a full-time position as an academic at Melbourne Law School. In 1978, he was called to the Victorian Bar and was appointed Queen's Counsel in 1994. He practised primarily in commercial law and equity. In August 2013, he joined the Court of Appeal, where he remained until his retirement in July 2018. He was a Senior Fellow in the Juris Doctor programme at the Melbourne Law School.

Together with Ian Renard, Santamaria was the co-author of Takeovers and Reconstructions in Australia. Between 1978 and 1990, Santamaria was a reporter for the Commonwealth Law Reports.

== Personal life and death ==
Santamaria was a son of Australian political activist B. A. Santamaria. He died at home in Melbourne, on 23 July 2026, at the age of 78.
