= David Harper (judge) =

Australian judge

David Harper was a Court of Appeals justice at the Supreme Court of Victoria. He is also a former President of the Victorian Chapter of the International Commission of Jurists. He attended the University of Melbourne, where he was a resident of Trinity College and Senior Student in 1965.
