= Philip Mandie =

Australian judge

Philip Mandie KC, (born Melbourne, 25 September 1942) was a judge on the Supreme Court of Victoria from May 1994 to August 2012. He was Judge in charge of the Commercial List (1995–2001), Corporations List (1995–2001, 2004–2005) and Victorian Taxation Appeals List (2007–2009); Chair of the Supreme Court Library Investment Committee (2002–2012), sometime member of the Supreme Court Executive Committee, Library Committee and Chair of the Supreme Court IT Committee .

He was elevated to the Court of Appeal from the Trial Division in 2009.

Mandie retired from the Supreme Court of Victoria on 31 August 2012.

In July 2013 Mandie was appointed a Reserve Judge of the Supreme Court of Victoria for a term of five years.

== Education ==
Mandie was educated at Gardenvale State School (1948–1952) and Wesley College (1953–1959). In 1959 he matriculated with a General Exhibition and four first class Honours (Modern History, Latin, French, and Economics) and was Dux of Wesley College in Humanities. Enrolling in Arts and Law, he attended the University of Melbourne from 1960 to 1964 gaining Exhibitions in Constitutional Law I and Mercantile Law (1963) and in Law Relating to Executors and Trustees and Industrial Law (1964). He was an Editor of the Melbourne University Law Review in 1964. He graduated Bachelor of Arts in 1964. He graduated Bachelor of Laws (Hons) in 1965 with First Class Honours and was awarded the Supreme Court Prize and E. J. B. Nunn Scholarship in the Law Honours Examination. Awarded a scholarship by Yale University and a Fulbright grant, he attended the Yale Law School in 1966–67 and graduated LLM in 1967.

== Academic positions ==
Mandie was Tutor in Introduction to Legal Method and Criminal Law in the Council of Legal Education Law Course (1968), Lecturer in Constitutional Law in the Council of Legal Education Law Course (1969–1973). He served as Independent Lecturer in Procedure in the Faculty of Law, University of Melbourne, and was a member of the Faculty, from 1972 to 1975.

== Victorian Bar ==
Mandie signed the Victorian Bar roll on 27 March 1969 and practised full time as a barrister from 1969 until his appointment as a judge in 1994. He was appointed Queen's Counsel for Victoria (1983), for New South Wales (1986) and for South Australia (1990). He was an elected member of the Victorian Bar Council in 1974–75, 1976–79 and 1982–84. He served as a member of the Bar Executive Committee in 1976–77, as a member of the Bar Ethics Committee 1977–84, and was Secretary of the Bar Ethics Committee from 1979 to 1984. He was also a member of the Bar Accommodation Committee 1972–75, 1976–77, a member of the Joint Bar–Law Institute Committee on Commonwealth Constitution Review 1972–73, a member of the Bar Law Reform Committee 1974–5, a member of the Leo Cussen Property Law Advisory Committee 1980–4, Bar Representative on the Professional Ethics Committee of the International Bar Association 1980–84, and a member of the Attorney-General's Working Party on the Legal Profession Practice Act in 1984.
