= Ross Robson =

Judge of the Supreme Court of Victoria

Ross Robson is a Trials Division justice at the Supreme Court of Victoria. He is a graduate of both the undergraduate and graduate law programs at the University of Melbourne. He also earned a Master of Science from the London School of Economics.
