= William Ormiston =

Australian judge

The Honourable William Ormiston AO QC

Judge of the Supreme Court of Victoria
- In office 1983–2005

Personal details
- Born: William Frederick Ormiston; 6 October 1935
- Died: 13 December 2014 (aged 79)

William Frederick Ormiston (6 October 1935 – 13 December 2014) was a Court of Appeal justice at the Supreme Court of Victoria in Australia.

Ormiston was educated at Melbourne Grammar School, the University of Melbourne (where he was business manager on the inaugural issue of the Melbourne University Law Review) and the London School of Economics. He took silk in 1975. Following his elevation to the bench in November 1983, sat on the Supreme Court for 22 years, with 10 of those on the Court of Appeal.
