= Elizabeth Hollingworth =

Australian judge

The Honourable Justice Elizabeth Hollingworth

Judge of the Supreme Court of Victoria
- Incumbent
- Assumed office 7 June 2004

Personal details
- Education: University of Western Australia; St Edmund Hall, Oxford
- Occupation: Judge, lawyer

Elizabeth Hollingworth is an Australian jurist. She is a Trials Division justice at the Supreme Court of Victoria. She was appointed to the bench in June 2004, after a 15-year career as a lawyer beginning in 1989.

In June 2014, Hollingworth made an order banning any reporting, including on the affidavit provided by Gillian Bird, in Australia, about a case involving Securency International, a partially state-owned company at the time, allegedly involved in the bribery of officials to win currency printing contracts. The order was published by WikiLeaks in July 2014, and Hollingworth revoked the suppression order in June 2015.

On 2 October 2014, Hollingworth sentenced Dylan Closter to 9 years and 3 months (6 years non parole) over the one-punch death of David Cassai, which fueled Cassai's mother to lobby for harsher sentencing in relation to one-punch deaths.

On 29 October 2019, Hollingworth sentenced Codey Herrmann to 36 years (30 years non parole) over the murder of Aiia Maasarwe.

On 19 December 2023, Convicted terrorist Abdul Nacer Benbrika was released into the community after Hollingworth granted his release on an extended supervision order.
