= Frank Callaway (judge) =

Australian judge (1945–2015)

The Honourable Frank Hortin Callaway RFD QC (10 November 1945 – 2 July 2015) was a Court of Appeal justice at the Supreme Court of Victoria, who served on the Court of Appeal from 1995 to 2007.

Callaway was educated at Melbourne Grammar School and the University of Melbourne, where he served as editor of the Melbourne University Law Review. In 2005 he addressed a New South Wales Bar Association conference in Sydney on statutory interpretation. He was a Fellow of the Royal Geographical Society and an Honorary Fellow of St Paul's College in the University of Sydney.
