= Rowena Orr =

Australian barrister and judge

Rowena Orr KC

Judge of the Court of Appeal of Victoria
- Incumbent
- Assumed office 18 April 2024

Solicitor-General of Victoria
- In office 2021–2024
- Preceded by: Kristen Walker
- Succeeded by: Alistair Pound

Personal details
- Born: 1973 (age 52–53)

Rowena Jane Orr (born 1973) is an Australian jurist who has served as a judge in the Court of Appeal of Victoria since 18 April 2024. From 2021 to 2024, Orr served as Solicitor-General of Victoria, and is best known for her role during the 2017–2019 Banking Royal Commission, where her performance assisting the commissioner gained her the moniker "shock and Orr".

Orr was born in 1973 in Sydney. She studied law and economics at the University of Queensland, graduating in 1996 with honours. Over the following years she worked as a judge's associate to Michael McHugh and John Murtagh Macrossan, then as a solicitor at the Director of Public Prosecutions, before leaving Australia for England where she studied at St John's College, Cambridge, attaining a Master of Philosophy in Criminology.

In 2002 she became a barrister, with a focus on criminal, trade practices, and administrative law, often representing Victoria Police. Early in her career as a barrister, she was involved in the inquest into the murder of Jaidyn Leskie. In 2014 she was appointed senior counsel. By 2018, Orr's practice had shifted to a focus on competition law while still maintaining work across a broad area of law, unusual in an era when most barristers specialized.

As of 2018, Orr lived in the Melbourne suburb of Clifton Hill with her husband, also a barrister, and their two children.
