= Paul Coghlan (judge) =

Australian judge

Paul Coghlan AO AO

Justice of the Supreme Court of Victoria
- In office 2007–2014

Director of Public Prosecutions and Chief Crown Prosecutor
- In office 2000–2007

Personal details
- Born: Australia
- Occupation: Judge, prosecutor
- Known for: Sentencing in high-profile criminal cases; Supreme Court of Victoria
- Awards: Officer of the Order of Australia (2019)

Paul Coghlan AO is a former Trials Division and Court of Appeals justice at the Supreme Court of Victoria. He has been practicing law since 1969 and was the principal judge of the criminal division of the Court between 2010 and 2012. Between 2000 and 2007 he served as Director of Public Prosecutions and Chief Crown Prosecutor. He retired from the Bench in 2014.

Coghlan was appointed an Officer of the Order of Australia (AO) in the 2019 Queen's Birthday Honours for "distinguished service to the law, and to the judiciary, and to the administration and review of criminal justice".

On April 11, 2011 Coghlan sentenced Arthur Freeman to life (32 years non parole) for throwing his 4 year old daughter Darcey off the West Gate Bridge.

On April 14, 2021 Coghlan sentenced Mohinder Singh Bajwa to 22 years (18 years and 6 months non parole) over the deaths of four police officers killed on the Eastern Freeway on April 22, 2020.
