= Jack Forrest (judge) =

Australian judge

John Herbert Lytton Jack Forrest is a justice of the Trial Division of the Supreme Court of Victoria, Australia since 2007. His father (chief judge James Forrest of the County Court) and brother Terry Forrest (also a current justice of the Supreme Court) also worked for the State of Victoria.
