= Michael MacDonald =

Michael MacDonald or Mike MacDonald may refer to:

== Politics ==
- Michael D. MacDonald, member of the Michigan Senate
- Michael James MacDonald (1909–1997), union leader and politician in Nova Scotia
- Michael L. MacDonald (born 1955), Canadian politician
- Michael Patrick MacDonald (born 1966), Irish-American activist against crime and violence
- Michael MacDonald (Green Party candidate)

== Sports ==
- Mike MacDonald (basketball), American basketball coach
- Mike MacDonald (rugby union) (born 1980), rugby union footballer
- Mike Macdonald (born 1987), head coach of the Seattle Seahawks

== Other ==
- Mike MacDonald (comedian) (1954–2018), Canadian comedian and actor
- Mike MacDonald (photographer) (born 1960), American nature photographer
- J. Michael MacDonald (born 1954), former Chief Justice of Nova Scotia
- Michael C. A. Macdonald, specialist in the languages of ancient Syria, Jordan and Arabia

== See also ==
- Michael McDonald (disambiguation)
