= James Dudley Elliott =

Australian judge

James Dudley Elliott is a Judge of the Supreme Court of Victoria and formerly sat as a judge of the Commercial Court. He is now the senior puisne judge and sits predominantly in the Criminal Division of the Court.

He was admitted to practice in 1988 after completing articles with Baker & McKenzie, signing the Bar Roll in 1990 and becoming Senior Counsel in 2004. He was appointed to the Trial Division of the Supreme Court on 26 March 2013.
