= Anthony Cavanough =

Australian judge

The Honourable Anthony Cavanough

Judge of the Supreme Court of Victoria
- In office 8 May 2006 – 13 December 2024

Personal details
- Education: Monash University (BEc, LLB (Hons))

Anthony Cavanough is a former Trials Division justice at the Supreme Court of Victoria. He is a graduate of the law program at Monash University and was called to the bar in 1979. He was appointed to the bench in 2009.

== Education ==
Cavanough studied at Monash University, where he completed a Bachelor of Economics and a Bachelor of Laws with honours, and undertook articles of clerkship at Mallesons.

== Career ==
In 1979, he served as associate to Sir Gerard Brennan, then a judge of the Federal Court of Australia and President of the Administrative Appeals Tribunal. He signed the Bar Roll on 19 June 1980 and was appointed Senior Counsel in 1996. During his years at the Bar, his practice focused largely on federal and state administrative law, and he also served for three years as a sessional Hearing Commissioner with the Human Rights and Equal Opportunity Commission.

Cavanough was appointed to the Trial Division of the Supreme Court of Victoria on 8 May 2006. He sat mainly in the Common Law Division and presided over a wide range of matters, including civil jury trials.

For two years, he was the judge in charge of the Valuation, Compensation and Planning List, and from its establishment in 2009 until 2023, he served as the judge jointly responsible for the Judicial Review and Appeals List. During his judicial tenure, he also sat for a term in the Criminal Division and for several terms in the Court of Appeal.

From 2012 to 2018, he chaired the Supreme Court Rules Committee and later continued to assist the Court with rules, practice notes and other procedural guidance. He also regularly lectured in the Practice Court segment of the Victorian Bar Readers’ Course.

For eleven years, Cavanough represented the Supreme Court of Victoria at the Supreme, Federal and New Zealand Senior Courts Conference and, for a period, chaired the organising committee of the conference.

He is a fellow of the Australian Academy of Law.

Cavanough retired from the Supreme Court of Victoria on 13 December 2024 after nearly nineteen years on the bench.
