= Hartley Hansen =

Australian judge (born 1942)

Hartley Roland Hansen AM KC (born 14 October 1942) is a retired Australian jurist who served as a judge of the Supreme Court of Victoria from 1994 to 2012, including as a judge of the Court of Appeal from 2010 to 2012.

Hansen was born in Melbourne, and educated at Melbourne Grammar School and the University of Melbourne.

Prior to his judgeship, Hansen was appointed Queen's Counsel in 1984, and was appointed as a trial judge of the Supreme Court in 1994.

In the 2020 Australia Day Honours, Hansen was appointed a Member of the Order of Australia for significant service to the law, and to professional associations.
