= Edward Dundas Holroyd =

Australian judge (25 January 1828 – 5 January 1916)

Sir Edward Dundas Holroyd KC (25 January 1828 – 5 January 1916) was a judge, active in Australia.

== Early life ==
Holroyd was born in Surrey, England. Holroyd practised in London and was also a free-lance journalist.

== Life and legacy ==
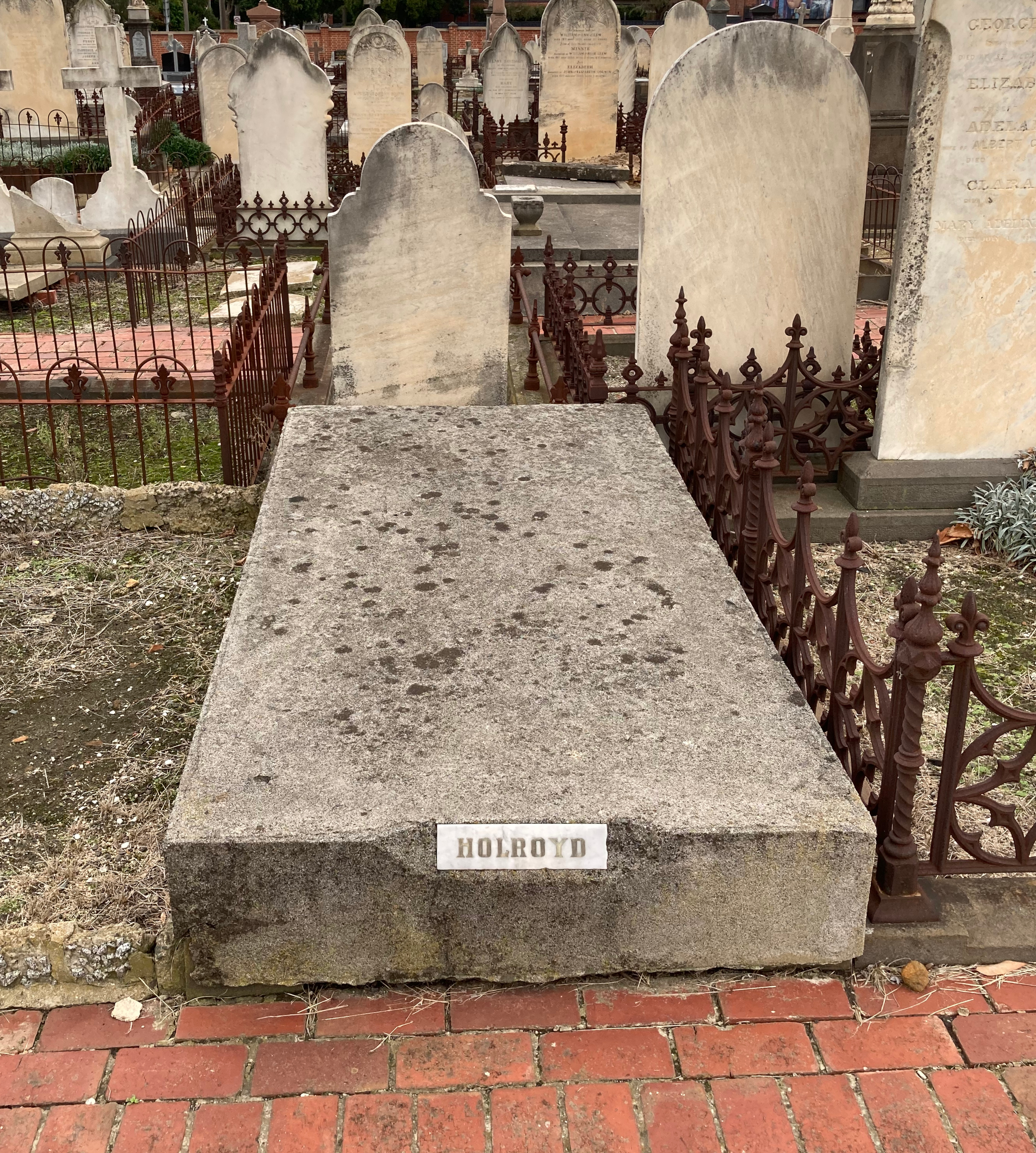
Holroyd's grave at St Kilda Cemetery

Holroyd retired in 1906 and died at his home, Fernacres, in Alma Road, St Kilda, Melbourne, on 5 January 1916. He was buried at St Kilda Cemetery.

== See also ==
- Judiciary of Australia
- List of Judges of the Supreme Court of Victoria
- Victorian Bar Association
