= Norman O'Bryan =

Australian barrister and judge (1894 – 1968)

The Honourable Sir Norman John O'Bryan, QC (16 October 1894 – 5 June 1968) was an Australian barrister and judge who sat on the Supreme Court of Victoria from 1939 to 1966.

== Early life and education ==
Norman John O'Bryan was born on 16 October 1894 in South Melbourne to a bank manager, Michael John O'Bryan, and his wife Mary Ann, née Gleeson. He attended the University of Melbourne and graduated in 1915 with a law degree, finishing top in his year.

== Career ==
O'Bryan was articled to Plante & Henry, and admitted as a solicitor and called to the bar in 1916. He then served in France during the First World War as an officer in the Australian Field Artillery.

Returning to Australia at the close of 1919, O'Bryan joined L. B. Cussen's chambers as a pupil in February 1920, thus beginning a lengthy career in law. He returned to the University of Melbourne in 1929 as a part-time lecturer in law, but left in 1932 as his practice expanded; he was appointed a King's Counsel in 1937 and, while Sir James Macfarlan was on leave, he was appointed an acting judge on the Victorian Supreme Court in February 1939. His appointment made substantive six months later; O'Bryan continued to serve on the Court until 1966, when he retired. In the meantime, he had advised the Minister of the Army during the Second World War, and chaired the advisory council of St Vincent's Hospital in Fitzroy for 19 years from 1944.

O'Bryan was knighted in 1958. He died on 5 June 1968 and was buried at Melbourne General Cemetery; his first wife, Elsa née Duncan, had died in 1928, but O'Bryan was survived by his second wife, Violet Leila, Elsa's younger sister. He had a daughter by his first wife, and along with four sons another by his second wife, who all survived him. His son, Norman Michael, QC (1930–2013), was a barrister and judge who also sat on the Supreme Court of Victoria, from 1977 to 1992.
