= Elizabeth Curtain =

Australian judge

The Honourable Elizabeth Curtain AM

Judge of the Supreme Court of Victoria
- In office 3 October 2006 – 8 May 2014

Judge of the County Court of Victoria
- In office 1993 – 2 October 2006

Personal details
- Education: Loreto-Mandeville Hall; University of Melbourne
- Occupation: Judge, Lawyer

Elizabeth Helen Curtain AM is a retired judge serving successively on the benches of the County Court of Victoria and the Supreme Court of Victoria, in the Australian state of Victoria, and is currently Chair of the Adult Parole Board of Victoria.

== Education ==
Curtain was educated at Loreto-Mandeville Hall and the University of Melbourne, from which she graduated with a Bachelor of Laws.

== Career ==
Curtain was admitted to practise and later signed the Roll of Counsel as a barrister in 1978, practising mostly in criminal law. She was appointed to the Administrative Appeals Tribunal of Victoria (from its inception) from 1985 to July 1987 and was also a member of the Motor Accidents Board. She was appointed a Prosecutor for the Queen for the State of Victoria from 1987 until 1993, when she was appointed a judge of the County Court.

During her tenure at the County Court, she was also Deputy Chairman of the Victorian Racing Appeals Tribunal, the Alternative Chairman of the Youth Parole Board and Alternative Chairman of the Youth Residential Board.

On 3 October 2006, Curtain was appointed to the Trial Division of the Supreme Court of Victoria. As a judge of that court she presided almost exclusively in criminal trials. On 29 May 2013, it was announced that Justice Curtain would take over as Chair of the Adult Parole Board, replacing Justice Simon Whelan. Curtain retired from the bench on 8 May 2014.

In 2017, Curtain was appointed a Member of the Order of Australia for significant service to the law, and to the judiciary, in Victoria, to medico-legal and professional groups, and to the community.
