= Thomas Cope (judge) =

Australian judge

His Honour Thomas Spencer Cope, LL.B., (19 April 1821 – 11 November 1891) was a judge in the colony of Victoria.

Cope was the third son of Thomas Cope, of West End, Hampstead, England, and in 1841 took the degree of LL.B. at the London University. He entered at the Middle Temple in April 1842, and studied law in the chambers of Thomas Chitty, being called to the bar in November 1845. He practised in the Courts at Westminster, and was for some time reporter for the Law Times in the Court of Exchequer, and at Nisi Prius for the Times and Daily News.

Cope emigrated to Natal in 1851, but, attracted by the gold discoveries, proceeded to Victoria, where he arrived in April 1853, and was admitted to the local bar. In 1854 Cope was appointed Deputy Judge and Chairman of General Sessions for the Ballarat district, in place of Arthur Wrixon, and in 1858 was appointed Judge of the Court of Mines and of the County Court, and Chairman of General Sessions for the district of Beechworth, where he remained for ten years, when he became County Court Judge of Melbourne. Cope, who acted as a Judge of the Supreme Court for nearly a year in 1885 to 1886, during the absence of Chief Justice William Stawell, resigned his seat on the bench in April 1888, and retired on a pension. He was one of the counsel for the Ballarat rioters in 1855, and was an advanced Liberal in politics, holding that the State should resume all sold lands and administer the same for the public benefit. Cope died on 11 November 1891.
