= William Kaye (judge) =

Australian judge (1919–2012)

The Honourable William Kaye AO QC

Judge of the Supreme Court of Victoria
- In office 1972–1990

Personal details
- Born: 8 February 1919 Melbourne, Australia
- Died: 12 May 2012 (aged 93)

William Kaye (8 February 1919 – 12 May 2012) was an Australian lawyer and judge who served on the Supreme Court of Victoria from 1972 to 1990.

Kaye was born in Melbourne to Chana (née Reizel) and Zelman Kaye. His parents were Ukrainian-Jewish immigrants originally from Berdiansk, and his father's original name was Shlomo Komesaroff. Kaye attended Scotch College before going on to study law the University of Melbourne. He enlisted in the Royal Australian Navy in 1941, and during the war served on HMAS Warrego and Cowra. He married Henrietta Ellinson while on leave in 1943; they had four children together, including Justice Stephen Kaye.

Kaye was admitted to the bar in 1946, and came to specialise in personal injury cases and in criminal and commercial law. He was appointed Queen's Counsel in 1962, and in 1971 served on the royal commission into the collapse of the West Gate Bridge. In 1972, Kaye replaced Ninian Stephen on the Supreme Court of Victoria. He served until his retirement in 1991, and in 1990 was made an Officer of the Order of Australia (AO). Kaye was the first Jew to serve on the Victorian Supreme Court, and was a member of the International Association of Jewish Lawyers and Jurists. He and his wife regularly visited Israel, and he was friends with members of the Israeli Supreme Court.

== See also ==
- List of Judges of the Supreme Court of Victoria
