= Bernard Bongiorno =

Australian professor

Bernard Daniel Bongiorno AO is an Australian professor who is a former Court of Appeal justice at the Supreme Court of Victoria in Australia. He was formerly a justice of the Trial Division of the Supreme Court, where he served between 2000 and 2009. Prior to that he served as the Victorian Director of Public Prosecutions, resigning in 1994.

Bongiorno grew up in Geelong. His ancestors emigrated to Australia from the Aeolian Islands. Bongiorno was involved with the Italian welfare society Co.as.it., serving as president. In 1999, the Italian government recognised his contribution to the Italian community in Victoria by appointing him a Commander of the Order of Merit of the Republic of Italy.

He was made an Officer of the Order of Australia (AO) in the 2010 Australia Day Honours "For service to the law, particularly as a Justice of the Supreme Court of Victoria, and through leadership roles within the Italian community". As of 2013, Bongiorno worked at Melbourne Law School as a "judge-in-residence."
