= Clive Tadgell =

Judge of the Supreme Court of Victoria

Robert Clive Tadgell (1934 – 14 July 2022) was a Court of Appeal justice at the Supreme Court of Victoria.

== Education ==
Tadgell commenced studies at the University of Melbourne Law School in 1954, and entered residence at Trinity College there in 1956, during his third year. He joined the college's debating club, known as the "Dialectic Society", and in 1957 was secretary and winner of the President's Medal for Oratory. He graduated with an LLB (Hons) degree in 1958, winning the Robert Craig Exhibition in Company Law and the Jenks Exhibition in Private International Law.

== Career ==
He was associate to Mr Justice Sholl and was later articled to Sir James Forrest at Hedderwick, Fookes & Alston. He was called to the bar in 1960, and took silk in 1974. He was appointed to the Supreme Court in 1980, and elevated to the Court of Appeal in 1995 upon its creation. He retired from the court on 30 May 2001.

He served on the council of Monash University from 1995 to 1998, and was elected to the Council of Trinity College in 1998. He was chancellor of the Diocese of Melbourne from 1981, and deputy president of the Appellate Tribunal of the Anglican Church of Australia from the same year (president from 1995). He was elected a canon of St Paul's Cathedral, Melbourne in 1998.

In 2005, he became an officer of the Order of Australia (AO), for "service to the judiciary, to the law, and to the community through contributions to higher education institutions and the Anglican Church in Australia".

Aged 88, Tadgell died on 14 July 2022.
