= Kristen Walker =

Australian lawyer and judge

Kristen Walker AM KC

Judge of the Court of Appeal of Victoria
- Incumbent
- Assumed office 3 May 2021

Solicitor-General of Victoria
- In office 2017–2021
- Preceded by: Richard Niall
- Succeeded by: Rowena Orr

Personal details
- Domestic partner: Miranda Stewart
- Education: Melbourne Law School; Columbia Law School
- Occupation: Judge, lawyer

Kristen Walker AM KC is an Australian lawyer. She is a judge in the Court of Appeal of Victoria and a former Solicitor-General of Victoria.

Walker's father was a barrister, and in reaction Walker initially enrolled in engineering, later transferring to a double degree of science and law. Following her studies at the Melbourne Law School, Walker was admitted as a solicitor in 1993. She became a judge's associate at the High Court of Australia to the chief justice Sir Anthony Mason. She received a Master of Laws from University of Melbourne and Columbia Law School in New York and worked as an academic in the US and at the University of Melbourne. She has taught and been published in areas of international, constitutional and human rights law.

Walker became a barrister in 2004 and was appointed as a queen's counsel in 2014. From 2017 Walker served as Solicitor-General of Victoria until her appointment to the Victorian Court of Appeal on 3 May 2021.

She was appointed a Member of the Order of Australia in the 2026 Australia Day Honours for "significant service to the judiciary, and to the law".

Walker and her partner Miranda Stewart (a professor at the Melbourne Law School) have one son.
