= Robert Osborn (judge) =

Australian judge

Robert Osborn is a Court of Appeals justice at the Supreme Court of Victoria, Australia. He was appointed in February 2012. Before this he was the principal judge in the Common Law Division of the Supreme Court.
