= Lesley Taylor (judge) =

Australian lawyer and judge

The Honourable Justice Lesley Taylor

Justice of the Supreme Court of Victoria
- Incumbent
- Assumed office 10 Jul 2018
- Preceded by: Lex Lasry

Lesley Ann Taylor is an Australian lawyer and judge of the Supreme Court of Victoria. She was appointed in 2018 after twenty years experience in criminal law and human rights.
