= David Beach (judge) =

Australian jurist

David Beach is an Australian jurist who is a justice of the Court of Appeal of the Supreme Court of Victoria.

Beach was appointed to the Trial Division of the court in 2008 and to the Court of Appeal in 2013 by Attorney-General, Robert Clark. Justice Beach was admitted to practice in 1983 and admitted as a barrister in 1984. He formerly worked as a solicitor for Galbally and O'Bryan, then a barrister. Justice Beach has made contributions to the Counsel Committee, Professional Indemnity Insurance Committee and Common Law Bar Association Committee.

His brother is Justice Jonathan Beach, a current judge of the Federal Court of Australia and his late father was former Justice Barry Beach, a judge of 25 years on the Supreme Court of Victoria.

On the 5th of April 2024 David Beach granted a teenage repeat offender bail for the third time after stating "I do believe in second chances, but I don't believe in third chances."
