= Terry Forrest =

Australian judge

Terence Michael "Terry" Forrest is a justice of the Court of Appeal of the Supreme Court of Victoria in Australia.

Forrest was admitted to the legal profession in 1979 and was appointed Queen's Counsel in 1999. He was appointed as a judge in the Trial Division of the Supreme Court in 2009 and elevated to the Court of Appeal on 10 July 2018.

Forrest's brother Jack is also a judge of the Supreme Court of Victoria. Their father, James Herbert Forrest, was a County Court and acting Supreme Court chief justice.
