= Rita Incerti =

Australian judge

Rita Incerti (born 28 December 1961) is a Justice in the Trial Division of the Supreme Court of Victoria. She has also been known as Justice Rita Zammit, but reverted to using her maiden name, Incerti, in January 2020.

== Career ==
Rita Incerti graduated from the University of Melbourne with a Bachelor of Law with First Class Honours in 1995. She began her law career as a solicitor with Minter Ellison in 1996 and was an Associate Judge of the Supreme Court of Victoria from 2009 until her appointment to the Trial Division in February 2015. Justice Incerti was the first Associate Justice to be appointed a Justice in the history of the Supreme Court of Victoria.
