= Stephen Kaye =

The Honourable Stephen Kaye AM

Judge of The Supreme Court of Victoria
- In office 16 December 2003 – 2 February 2015
- Succeeded by: The Honourable Justice Cameron Macaulay

Judge of the Victorian Court of Appeal
- In office 3 February 2015 – 13 December 2021

Reserve Judge of the Victorian Court of Appeal
- Incumbent
- Assumed office 14 December 2021

Personal details
- Born: 13 December 1951 (age 74) Victoria
- Spouse: Karen
- Children: 4
- Parent(s): William, Henrietta
- Education: Scotch College; Monash University

Stephen William Kaye (born 1951) is a judge of the Supreme Court of Victoria. He was appointed to the bench on 16 December 2003, serving as a judge of the Trial Division until his appointment the Court of Appeal in 2015. On 1 February 2022, the Attorney General of the Victorian Government announced the end of his term from the Court of Appeal.

Kaye is the son of William Kaye, who was also a Supreme Court judge. His paternal grandparents were Jewish immigrants from Ukraine. Like his father, Kaye attended Scotch College, where he was dux in 1968. He then studied law at Monash University.

Kaye was appointed a Member of the Order of Australia in the 2014 Australia Day Honours.
