= Michael Phillip McDonald =

Australian judge

Michael Phillip McDonald is a Justice in the Trial Division of the Supreme Court of Victoria and Head of the Industrial Relations and Employment Law List.

His secondary education was with the Christian Brothers at St Thomas More College and St Leo's College. He completed a Bachelor of Arts and Bachelor of Laws, and subsequently a Master of Laws, at the University of Melbourne.

McDonald was admitted to practice in 1985 and signed the Bar Roll in 1989. He practiced as a barrister for more than 25 years, nearly 9 years as Silk, and was a leader in Employment and Workplace Relations Law.

He served Articles at Phillips, Fox & Masel. He later became an Advocate, first for the Australian Public Service Association, and later for the Municipal Officers Association. He appeared regularly in the Supreme Court of Victoria, in the Federal Court and in the Fair Work Commission, and also in several landmark cases in the High Court, including:

- Patricks v The Maritime Union of Australia;
- Re Pacific Coal Pty Limited; Ex parte: The CMFEU);
- Electrolux v The Australian Manufacturing Workers Union; and
- The Minister for Employment and Workplace Relations v Gribbles Radiology Pty Ltd.

He was appointed Senior Counsel in 2005 before becoming a Queen's Counsel in 2014 and took up his appointment on the Supreme Court on 16 September 2014.
