= Commercial Court (Victoria) =

Commercial division of the Supereme Court of Victoria

The Commercial Court is a sub-division of the Trial Division of the Supreme Court of Victoria, the highest court of the State of Victoria. The Supreme Court has unlimited jurisdiction in criminal and civil matters.

The Commercial Court comprises a group of specialist judges who are available to deal promptly and efficiently with commercial disputes.

Any commercial proceeding or corporations case is suitable for entry into the Commercial Court, unless the case is more suited for entry into one of the other specialist lists in the Trial Division

A feature of Commercial Court practice is the readiness of the judges and associate judges to mould existing procedures to suit the particular case and to encourage the parties to adopt novel procedures where appropriate. The operation and procedures of the Commercial Court are set out in some detail in a practice note. and other Commercial Court notices to practitioners, which are available on the Commercial Court website.

Each case is entered into a list within the Commercial Court, and is managed to trial by the judge and associate judge assigned to that list. The trial will normally be heard by the judge in whose list the case has been entered. Initial directions are before the list judge or, at the judge’s discretion, before the associate judge. At an early stage in the proceeding the parties will normally participate in a Case Management Conference presided over by the judge at which time the real issues of fact and law are identified and the best methods of their resolution are decided upon.
