= Judge's associate =

Assistant to a judge in an court

A judge's associate is an individual who provides assistance to a judge or court.

In Australia, a judge's associate (not to be confused with a tipstaff) is a recent law graduate or lawyer who performs various duties to assist a specific judge, such as legal research, proofreading draft judgments, providing substantive comments to the judge and administrative duties.

In England, a judge's associate is an administrative role. In New Zealand, a judge's associate was a court stenographer.

== Australia ==
Almost all Australian courts employ judicial clerks to assist judges with legal research and reviewing draft judgments. In federal courts and some state courts, the position is known as a "Judge's Associate". However, in the Supreme Court of New South Wales, the position is known as a "Tipstaff". A point of confusion is that, in New South Wales, a judge's personal assistant or administrative secretary is known as an Associate.

The extent and nature of the tasks performed by an associate or tipstaff depends on the individual judge. Unlike in the United States, they rarely prepare whole initial drafts of a judgment, though they may draft parts. Tasks may include preparing research memos to the judge on questions of law, checking draft judgments for accuracy with the record, providing critique on the substance of the reasoning of judgments, assisting with speech-writing and research, communicating with lawyers who contact the judge's chambers, and administrative duties.

Applicants to the positions are usually required to have graduated with a law degree and have performed well in their studies. However, as the selection of associates is within the personal remit of the relevant judge and not subject to public scrutiny, nepotism and/or favouritism remains a live criticism of the associate selection process.

The positions usually run for one year.

Generally the higher the court, the more competitive selection becomes. It is not uncommon for associates in the High Court of Australia to have attained the university medal in law, come close to the top of their class, or worked for a judge previously in a lower court. The website of the High Court states that competition is "very strong" and that there are sometimes upwards of 200 applications for a single vacancy. The website of the Supreme Court of New South Wales describes tipstaff positions as "extremely popular and therefore highly competitive" and that applicants are expected to have "a strong academic record".

In the High Court, each of the seven Justices has two associates at any given time. Usually, one associate is based permanently in Canberra, the capital of Australia and the seat of the Court, and one is based in the judge's home town and travels with the judge when the Court is on circuit to the other capital cities. Previous associates have written that the nature of the associate's role is different from that of a law clerk in the United States.

== England and Wales ==
In country causes the record etc. had to be entered, and the cause set down for trial, with the judge's associate.

For the penalty for the recording, by a judge's associate, of appearances by a party when the party did not in fact appear, see section 3 of the act 3 Geo. 2. c. 25 (1729 or 1730), which was replaced by section 39 of the Juries Act 1825 (6 Geo. 4. c. 50), which is repealed (see the Courts Act 1971).

== New Zealand ==
In New Zealand, a judge's associate was a court stenographer. A judge's associate recorded the evidence given in court either in shorthand or with a typewriter.

A judge's associate is referred to in court as "Your Honour's associate".

A judge's associate was allowed to make part of their salary by supplying copies of the Judge's notes to litigants. Mr Taylor, Member of Parliament for Christchurch City said that this practice should be abolished and that judge's associates should be paid a fixed salary instead.
