= Supreme Court of Victoria =

Superior court of the state of Victoria, Australia

- Emblem of the Supreme Court

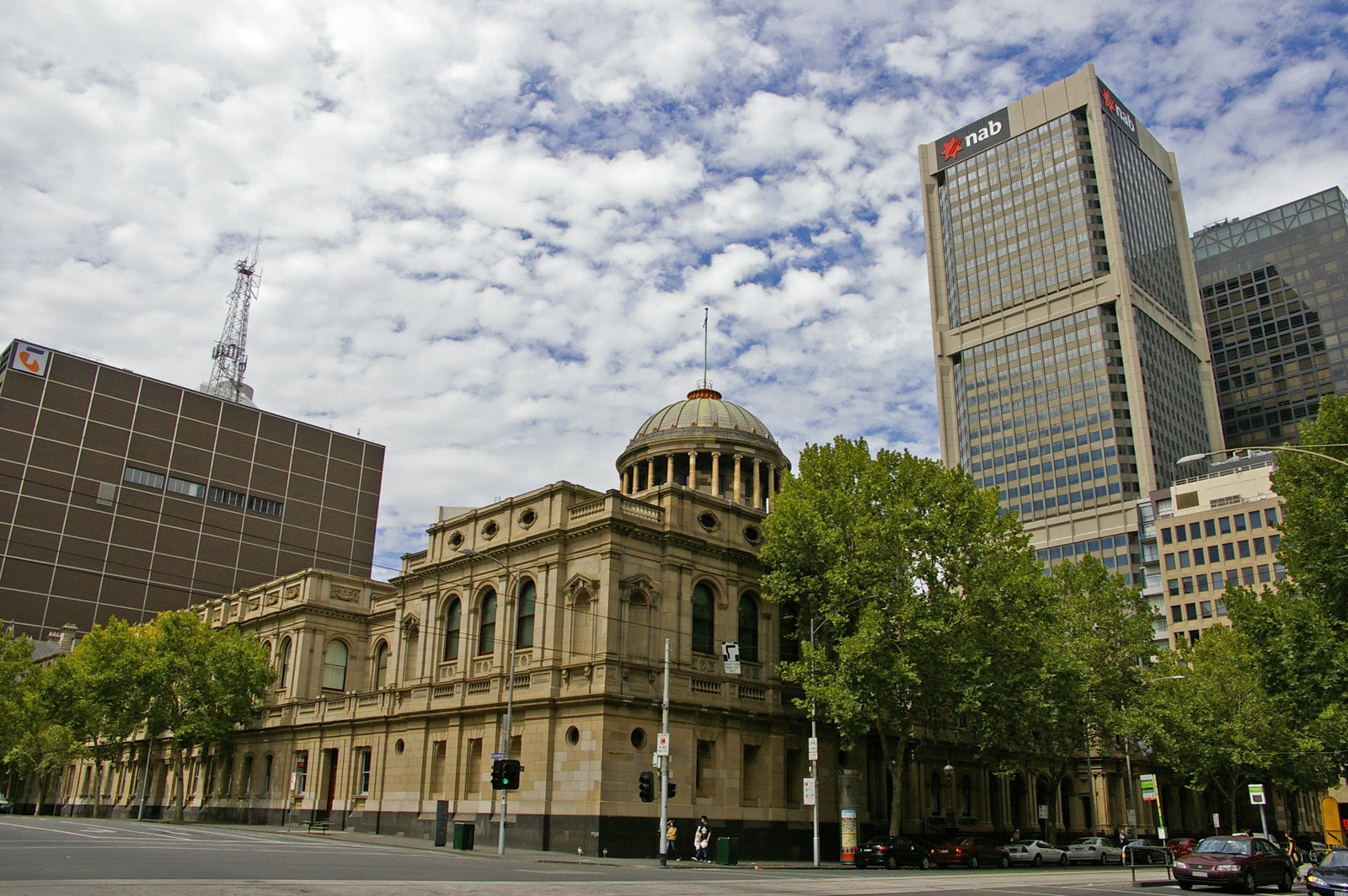
- Supreme Court Building, William Street
- Interactive map of Supreme Court of Victoria
- 37°48′51″S 144°57′29″E
- Established: 1852
- Jurisdiction: Victoria
- Location: Melbourne
- Coordinates: 37°48′51″S 144°57′29″E
- Composition method: Appointed by Governor on the advice of the Executive Council
- Authorised by: None (inherent jurisdiction)
- Appeals to: High Court of Australia
- Appeals from: County Court; Magistrates' Court (Note: On questions of law)
- Judge term length: Mandatory retirement by age 70
- Website: www.supremecourt.vic.gov.au

Chief Justice of Victoria
- Currently: The Honourable Chief Justice Richard Niall
- Since: 3 February 2025

The Supreme Court of Victoria is the highest court in the Australian state of Victoria. Founded in 1852, it is a superior court of common law and equity, with unlimited and inherent jurisdiction within the state.

The Supreme Court comprises two divisions: the Trial Division, which oversees its original jurisdiction, and the Court of Appeal, which deals with its appellate jurisdiction, and is frequently referred to as a court in its own right. Although the Supreme Court is theoretically vested with unlimited jurisdiction, it generally only hears, at trial, criminal cases in instances of murder, manslaughter or treason, and civil cases where the statement of claim is in excess of the Magistrates' Court limit of $100,000.

The court hears appeals from the County Court, as well as limited appeals from the Magistrates' Court. Decisions of the Supreme Court are appealable to the High Court of Australia.

The building itself is on the Victorian Heritage Register.

== Jurisdiction ==
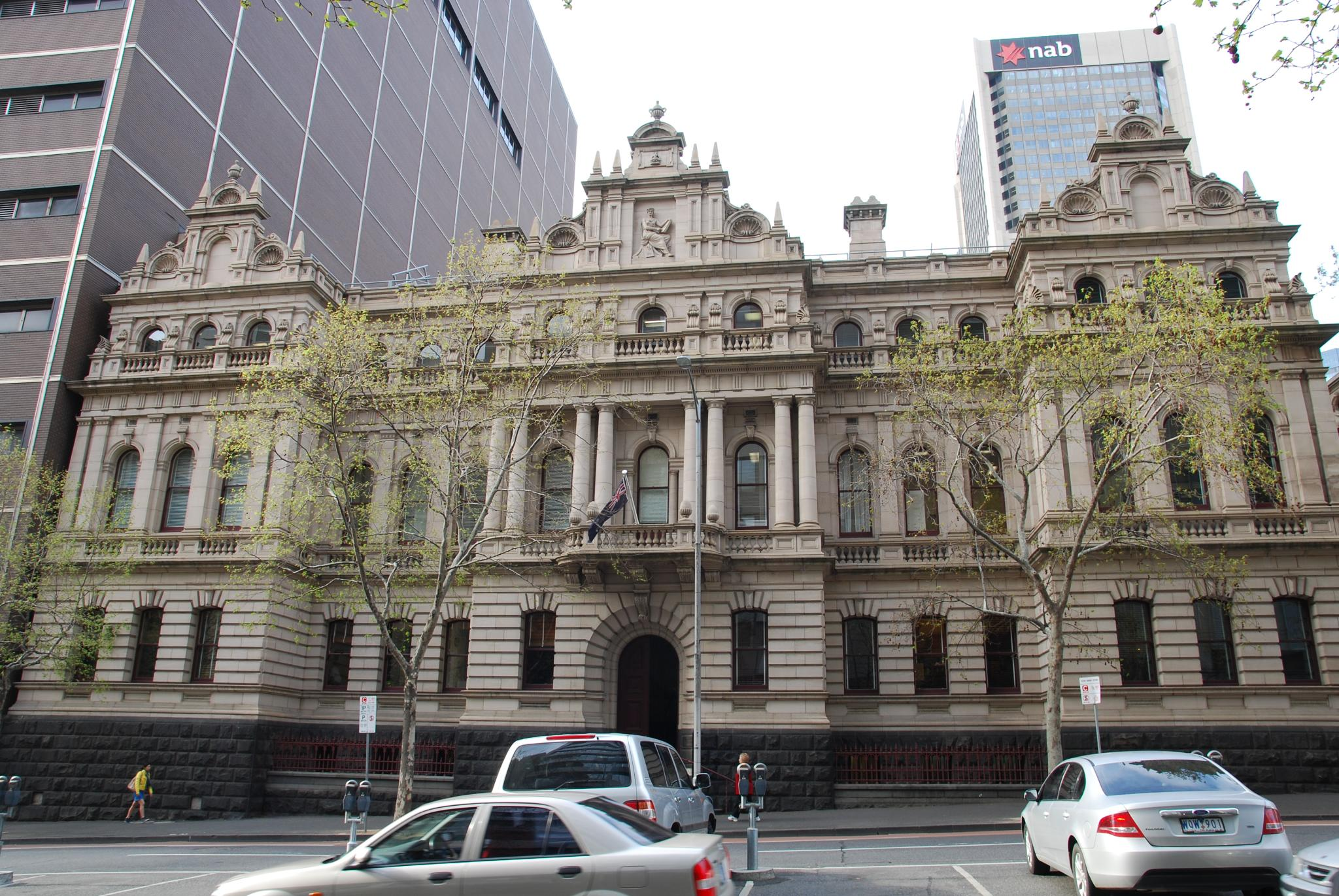
Facade of the Court of Appeal

The Supreme Court has two divisions: the Trial Division and the Court of Appeal.

=== Trial Division ===
The Trial Division sits with one judge, and usually acts as a court of original jurisdiction for serious criminal matters such as murder, attempted murder, corporate offences and certain conspiracy charges, and civil matters which are considered to involve greater complexity or amounts of money more than would be appropriate to have determined in the Magistrates' Court (whose civil jurisdictional limit is $100,000) or County Court (whose jurisdiction has since the beginning of 2007 been unlimited as to amount). The Trial Division also acts as an appeal court from the Magistrates' Court on questions of law, and appeals from the Victorian Civil and Administrative Tribunal on points of law, except against an order of the President or Vice-President of the Tribunal. It also hears federal indictable offences such as treason.

The Commercial Court is a sub-division of the Trial Division, composed of specialist judges to deal with commercial disputes.

=== Court of Appeal ===
The Court of Appeal hears appeals from the County Court and the Trial Division, as well as appeals on points of law from the Victorian Civil and Administrative Tribunal against the order of the President or Vice-President, or from the Magistrates' Court against the order of the Chief Magistrate, and usually consists of a panel of three Judges of Appeal. In rare cases where it is sought to overrule or reconsider the correctness of a previous Court of Appeal decision, it can sit with five judges.

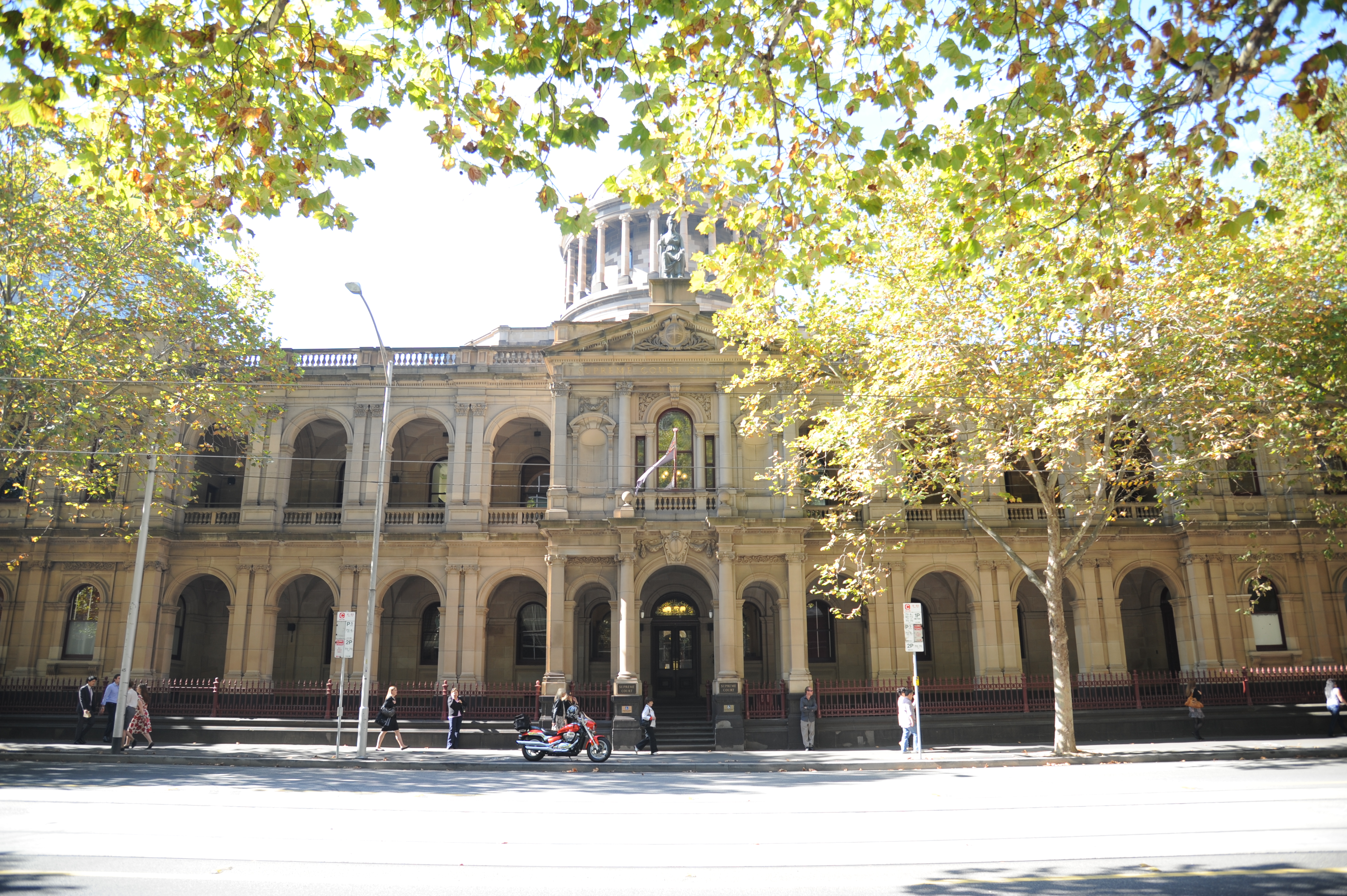
Front facade of the Supreme Court of Victoria

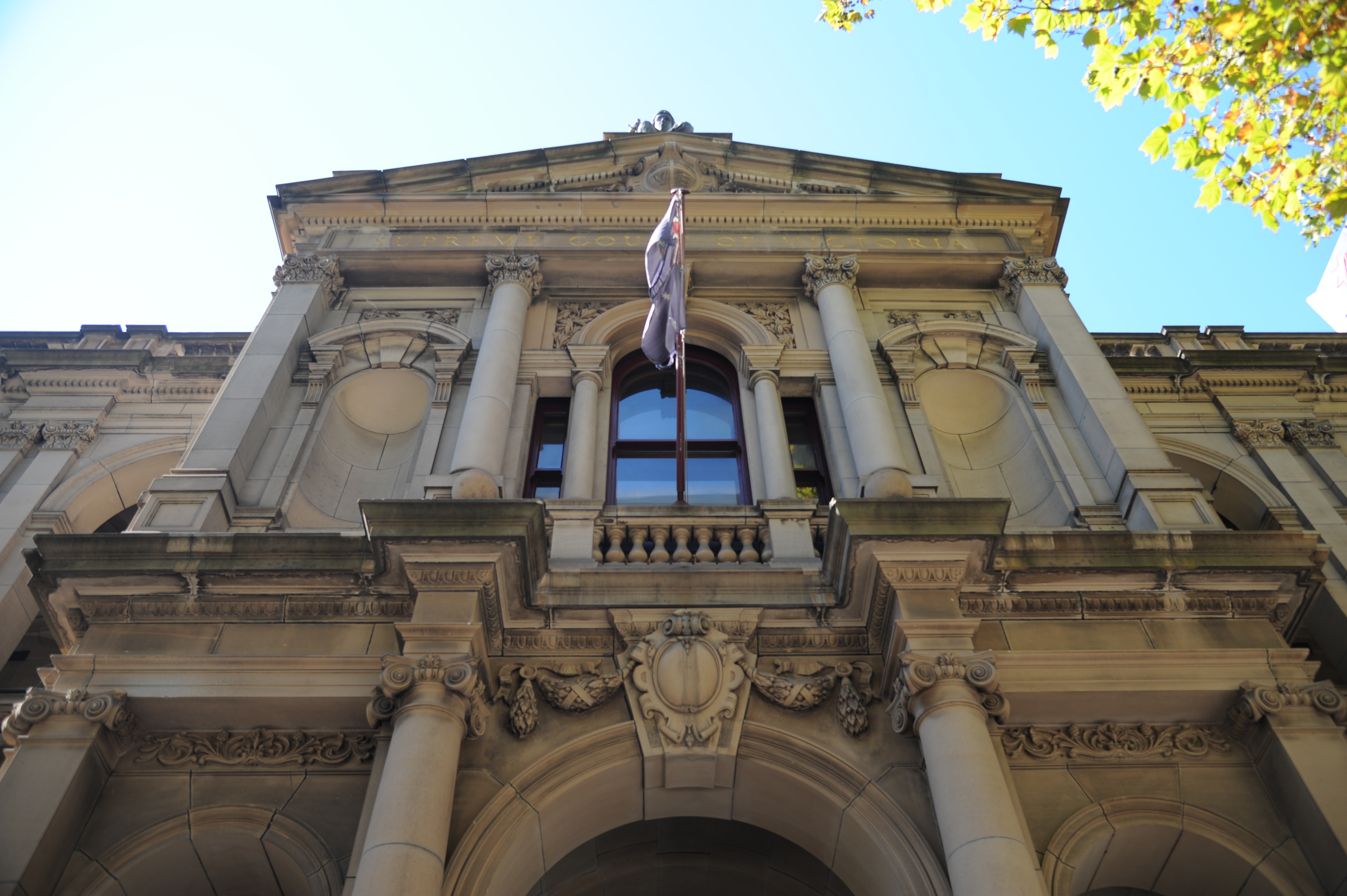
Supreme Court of Victoria Front Entrance

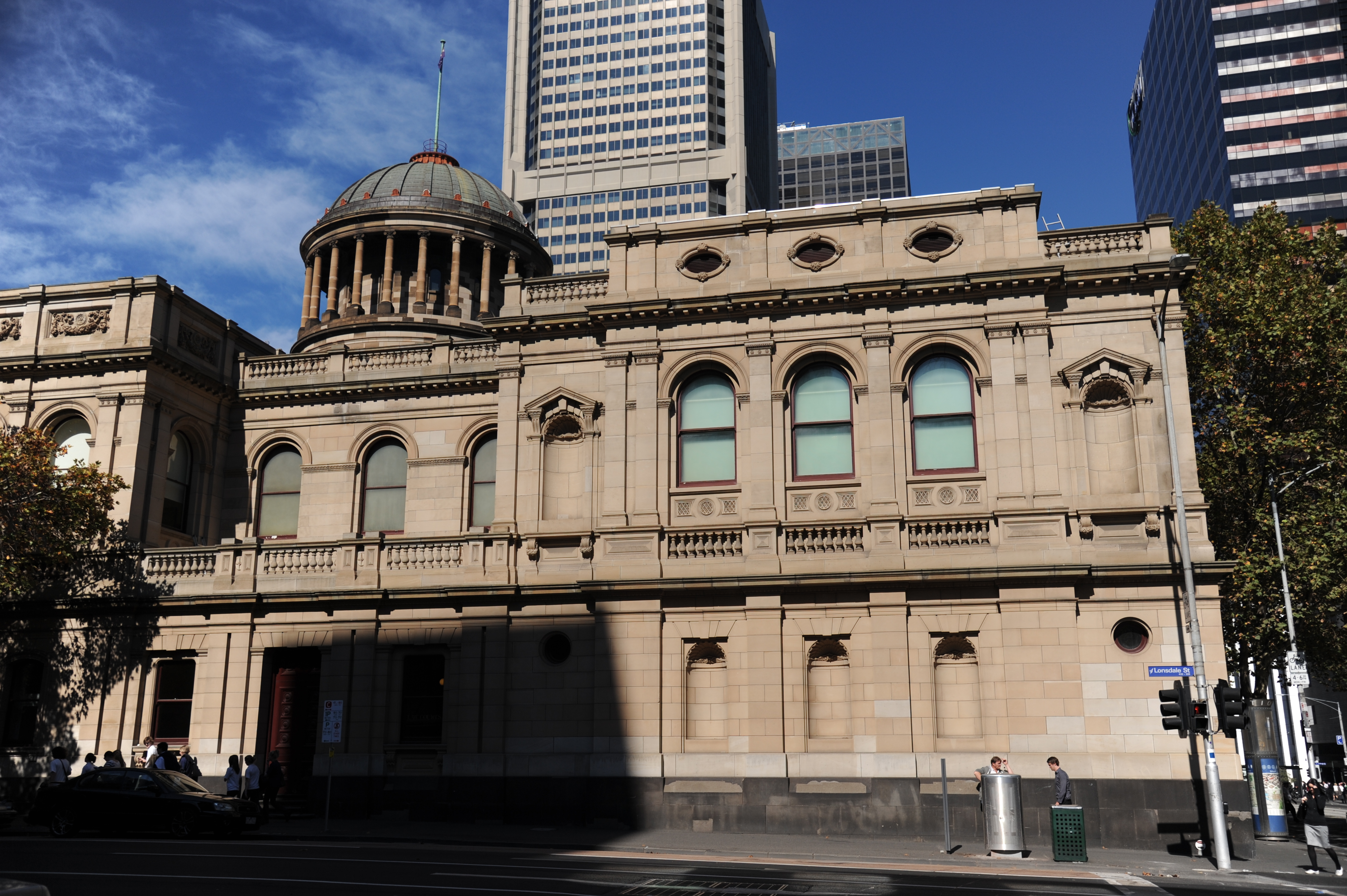
View of Lonsdale Street facade

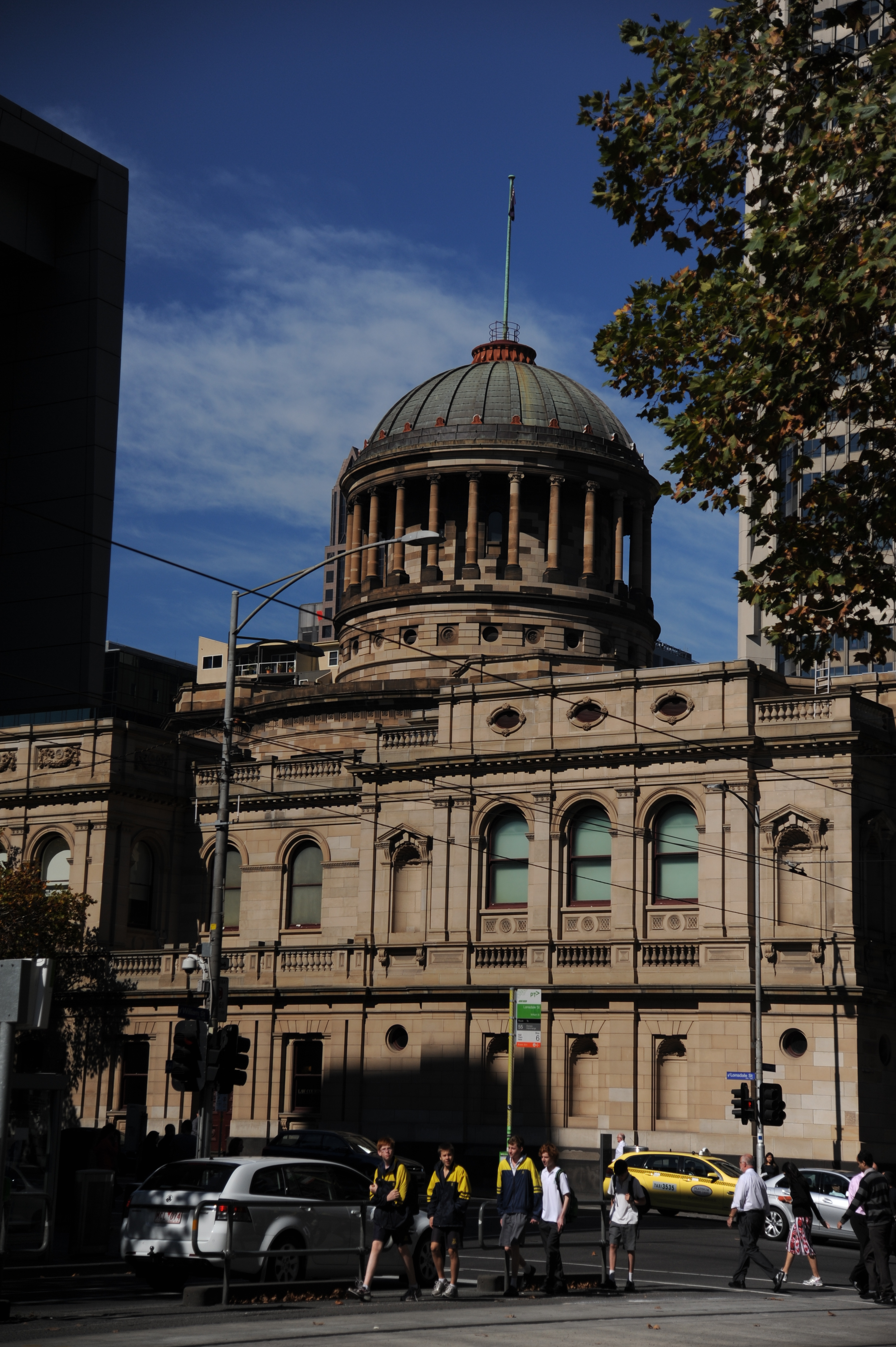
Supreme Court of Victoria Library Tower Dome

== Locations ==
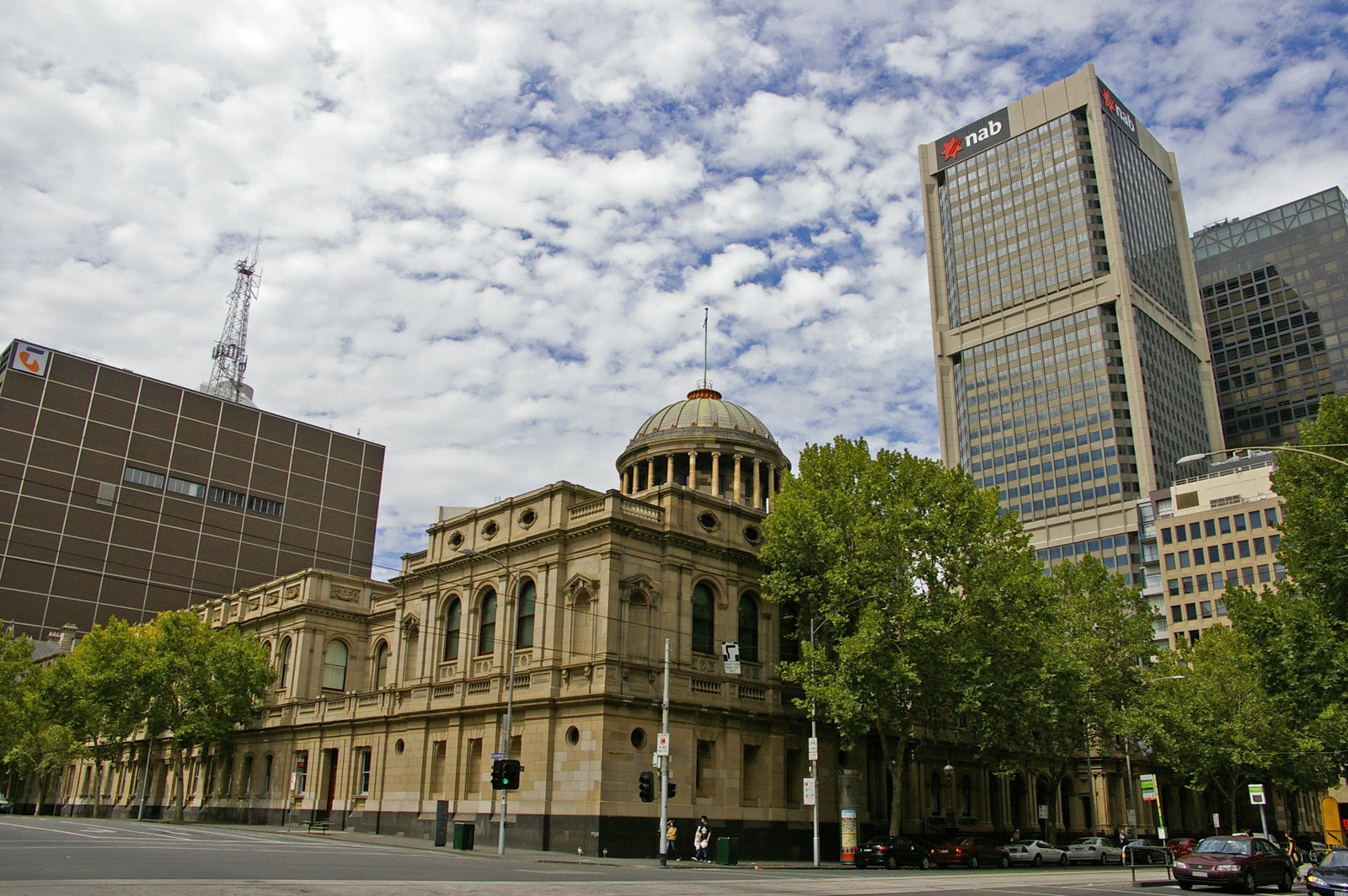
The Supreme Court of Victoria is located on the corner of Lonsdale and William Streets, Melbourne CBD, at the same intersection as the Melbourne Magistrates' Court and the County Court of Victoria.

The main buildings for the Supreme Court are located at the corner of William and Lonsdale Streets in Melbourne and in nearby buildings.

The Supreme Court also does circuits to Bendigo, Ballarat, Geelong, Warrnambool, Hamilton, Horsham, Mildura, Shepparton, Wangaratta, Wodonga, Sale and Morwell. In these locations the Court uses the facilities of the local Magistrates' Court.

== Current judges ==
(appointment date in brackets):

=== Chief Justice ===
- Richard Niall (Court of Appeal from 28 November 2017; 3 February 2025)

=== President of the Court of Appeal ===
- Karin Emerton (Trial Division from 13 October 2009; Court of Appeal from 10 July 2018; 16 July 2022)

=== Judges of the Court of Appeal ===
- David Beach (Trial Division from 5 September 2008; 22 October 2013)
- Stephen McLeish (5 March 2015)
- Maree Kennedy (Trial Division from 25 July 2016; 15 December 2020)
- Kristen Walker (3 May 2021)
- Lesley Taylor (Trial Division from 10 July 2018; 25 October 2022)
- Kevin Lyons (Trial Division from 22 May 2018; 31 October 2023)
- Christopher Boyce (21 November 2023)
- Rowena Orr (18 April 2024)
- Peter Barrington Kidd (Chief Judge of County Court from 8 September 2015; Trial Division from 24 May 2016; 28 April 2025)
- Melinda Richards (Trial Division from 24 April 2018; 13 May 2025)
- Stephen Donaghue (27 January 2026)

=== Judges of the Trial Division ===
- James Dudley Elliott (25 March 2013)
- Melanie Sloss (30 July 2013)
- Michael Croucher (30 July 2013)
- Michael Phillip McDonald (16 September 2014)
- Rita Incerti (3 February 2015)
- Jane Dixon (17 August 2015)
- Andrew John Keogh (4 April 2016)
- Michelle Quigley (19 December 2017)
- Matthew Connock (10 April 2018)
- Melinda Richards (24 April 2018)
- Steven Moore (10 July 2018)
- Andrew Tinney (10 July 2018)
- Jacinta Forbes (16 April 2019)
- Lisa Nichols (22 October 2019)
- Christopher James Delany (2 June 2020)
- Kathryn Stynes (22 June 2020)
- James Gorton (15 December 2020)
- Michael Osborne (15 December 2020)
- Stephen O'Meara (18 May 2021)
- Richard Attiwill (18 May 2021)
- Amanda Fox (13 August 2021)
- Andrea Tsalamandris (22 February 2022)
- Lisa Hannan (29 March 2022)
- Edward Woodward (5 June 2023)
- Peter Gray (14 June 2023)
- Patricia Matthews (14 June 2023)
- Ian Waller (12 September 2023)
- Claire Harris (4 November 2023)
- Andrew Watson (13 November 2023)
- Paul Cosgrave (8 December 2023)
- Kerri Judd (17 September 2024)
- Adrian Finanzio (25 February 2025)
- Amanda Chambers (27 Mary 2025)
- Lisa Hannon (12 August 2025)
- Robert Craig (12 August 2025)
- Michael O’Connell (3 February 2026)
- Diana Piekusis (3 February 2026)
- Samuel Hay (21 April 2026)

== See also ==
- Judiciary of Australia
- List of Judges of the Supreme Court of Victoria
- List of Victorian Supreme Court cases
- Supreme Court of Victoria (Building)
