= Monash University Faculty of Law =

Law school in Melbourne, Victoria, Australia

Coordinates: 37°54′47″S 145°7′55″E

- Type: Public
- Established: 1964
- Affiliations: Monash University
- Dean: Steven Vaughan
- Students: 3,500
- Location: Clayton, Victoria, Australia
- Campus: Urban
- Website: https://www.monash.edu/law

The Monash University Faculty of Law is the law school of Monash University. Founded in 1964, it is based in Melbourne, Victoria and has campuses in Malaysia and Italy. It is consistently ranked as one of the top law schools in Australia and globally, and entry to its Bachelor of Laws (LLB) programme is highly competitive.

The Faculty of Law offers the Bachelor of Laws (LLB), with which students may combine other degrees as part of a double degree, the Juris Doctor (JD), Master of Laws (LLM) and the Doctor of Philosophy (PhD). It currently has approximately 3,914 undergraduate and postgraduate students and over 100 professors, lecturers and teaching associates.

The Faculty of Law's alumni include the former treasurer of Australia Josh Frydenberg, the current chief justice of the Supreme Court of Victoria Anne Ferguson, judges of the Federal Court of Australia, Supreme Court of Victoria and Supreme Court of New South Wales, the former leader of the Australian Greens Adam Bandt, the current attorney-general of Victoria Jill Hennessy, members of the Australian Parliament, legal scholars, state politicians, prominent businesspersons, artists and media personalities.

The Monash University Law Review is the Faculty of Law's flagship academic journal. It is managed by students and supervised by faculty advisors.

== History ==
=== Foundation ===
In the 1950s, it had become clear that Melbourne's only law school at the time, Melbourne Law School, would soon be unable to meet the rising demand for legal education. Although Monash University was founded to focus primarily on science and technology, it would inevitably establish a law school. The need was not considered pressing enough to make a law school a foundation faculty of the new university; however, when Melbourne Law School imposed quotas on law school candidates due to a lack of resources, a new law school was immediately needed to cater for the extra students. The Victorian Council of Legal Education, the chief justice of Victoria and the Victorian Government pushed for the overnight establishment of a law school at Monash University, but this was resisted by the University's Vice-Chancellor, Sir Louis Matheson, who wanted a high quality, well-planned, original faculty of law. In the end, it was over a relatively short period of time – 5 months from October 1963 to March 1964 – that a first-year law school curriculum was established and two teaching staff were appointed. However, when students first arrived in 1964, they did so with the knowledge that the curriculum for their later years was still being written. A law library was established with impressive speed, after substantial book donations from two former justices of the Supreme Court of Victoria. Appropriately for a law school, the Faculty's establishment was delayed by a dispute over the interpretation of the Monash University Act, concerning when and how the University Council could set up new faculties. Following debate between Monash University, the Crown Solicitor and the Parliamentary Draftsmen, the Act was eventually amended.

=== Early years ===
David Derham was the Faculty of Law's first dean, beginning his term on 29 February 1964 after resigning his post as Professor of Jurisprudence at Melbourne Law School the day before. Derham immediately sought to depart radically from the way that law had been taught previously in Australia. His appointment was announced on a Monday, and he was reportedly outlining detailed proposals for first-year subjects by the following Friday. He drastically reworked the curriculum and teaching style which his faculty had taught at Melbourne Law School. Monash University introduced small-group teaching, interactive lectures and a curriculum which emphasised legal skills in addition to a knowledge of the law itself. Classes were taught not only by academics but also by practising members of the legal profession. According to Derham, the reason behind this approach was that the law is "not fixed and static. It moves and grows." This stood in contrast to the conventional style of teaching in other Australian law schools, in which part-time staff members would deliver lectures to a hall of students with little or no student-teacher interaction. A similar transformation later took place at the University of New South Wales in Sydney. In later years, Derham also managed to establish strong international links with law schools in North America and Europe, which continue today.

The first intake of law school students began in March 1964 with an initial enrolment of 149 students, after a lengthy selection and interview process. Seventeen of the 149 students (11.4%) were women. The four subjects in the first-year curriculum were an introductory legal subject named "The Legal System", criminal law (which was designed to introduce students to the casebook method pioneered in the United States), a British history subject focused on constitutional developments, and a subject taught either in the Faculty of Arts or the Faculty of Economics and Politics. The first lecture, on "The Legal System", was held by Derham on 9 March 1964, with all staff sitting anxiously in the front row. The first professor appointed by the Faculty of Law was Louis Waller AO, who later served as Dean.

According to the Faculty of Law's early staff members, the opportunity to develop a new and original law school excited all those involved in Monash Law School's early years. In addition to its teaching reforms, Monash also became the first law school in Australia to establish its own community legal centres, which were and continue to be run by students under the supervision of staff and other lawyers. In 1971, Monash set another precedent for Australian law schools when Enid Campbell became the first female Dean of any Law School in Australia's history.

=== Recent history ===
When Monash University expanded in the 1990s, the Faculty of Law chose not to extend itself to other campuses. Instead, it chose selectively to use Monash University's global presence to create new opportunities for international study and research. The result was the establishment and expansion of international collaboration and exchange programs with law schools around the world. Additionally, the Faculty of Law established the Malaysia Program and the Prato Program, allowing its students to complete part of their degrees at the University's campuses in Malaysia and Italy. In 2008, the Faculty of Law announced that it would begin offering a dual Master of Laws with the Washington College of Law – the first such program by an Australian law school.

The Faculty of Law has made a name for itself as a dynamic and progressive law school, in a field which has been criticised for being overly traditional and out-of-touch. It hosts faculty-run Community Legal Centres, staffed by undergraduate law students who may undertake clinical work as part of their degrees. As a result, by the early 1990s, the Faculty of Law's undergraduate law program was regarded by some in the legal profession as superior to that of its traditional rival, Melbourne Law School.

Today the Faculty of Law has over 3,914 undergraduate and postgraduate students, and over one hundred academic staff.

=== Deans ===
- David Derham (1964–1968)
- Louis Waller (1969–1970)
- Enid Campbell (1971)
- David Allan (1971–1976)
- Patrick Nash (1977–1980)
- Bob Baxt AO (1980–1988)
- Charles Williams (1988–1998)
- Stephen Parker (1999–2003)
- Arie Freiberg (2004-2012)
- Bryan Horrigan (2013–2024)
- Marilyn Pittard (2024—2025)
- Steven Vaughan (2025–present)

== Admissions ==
Entry to the Bachelor of Laws is highly competitive, with an ATAR score of approximately 98 required for guaranteed entry in 2020. Entry to the Juris Doctor is also competitive, with a minimum undergraduate degree grade point average of 5.0 on a 7-point scale (or equivalent experience or qualifications) or 4.0 on a 7-point scale with a minimum LSAT score of 150 required for guaranteed entry in 2021.

== Rankings ==
The Faculty of Law is consistently ranked as one of the top law schools in Australia and the world. In 2018, it was ranked first in Australia in the Academic Ranking of World Universities. It is also consistently ranked as one of the top 40 law schools in the world, and is currently QS World University Rankings at number 40 in 2021.

== Research ==
Academic staff at Monash Law School publish books and journal articles across almost all areas of law. Part of this research is organised around specialist centres, including:

- The Castan Centre for Human Rights Law
- The Australian Centre for Justice Innovation
- The Centre for Commercial Law and Regulatory Studies
- Law, Health and Wellbeing
- Eleos Justice
- The Transnational Criminal Law Group
- The Feminist Legal Studies Group

The Faculty's research is further supported by eight research 'clusters': commercial and private law; criminal law and justice; family law; innovation and information law; international, European and comparative law; legal philosophy and legal theory; public law, government and regulation; and the legal profession.

=== Monash Centre for Commercial Law and Regulatory Studies ===
The Monash Centre for Regulatory Studies was a teaching and research centre with a multidisciplinary focus, leading studies on the regulation of areas such as business, health sciences and technology. The director of the centre was Graeme Hodge. It became the Centre for Commercial Law and Regulatory Studies (CLARS), directed by Professor Jennifer Hill since 2019, the inaugural Bob Baxt AO Chair in Corporate and Commercial Law, hosting the annual Bob Baxt AO address in Corporate and Commercial Law since 2021.

=== Publications ===
The following legal journals are based at Monash Law School:

- Monash University Law Review
- Alternative Law Journal
- Australian Journal of Legal Philosophy

== Law Library ==
The Monash University Law School (David Derham Law School Building) Clayton Campus.

The Faculty of Law's library is split over four levels in the David Derham Law School Building. Architecturally, the building reflects the post World War II popularity of modernism. Academic staff offices surround the library. The main areas of student activity are located on the ground floor basement. The Monash Law Students' Society office (colloquially 'LSS') and the adjoining room provide LSS members and LSS officials' office space and recreation area. The Monash Law building facade was redeveloped, finishing in 2013. This provided an entirely renovated building face and basement foyer, to go along with the recently renovated outdoor area at the entrance of the Faculty of Law.

The Library houses a major collection of printed and electronic material. In addition to the many online databases and e-books, its physical collection contains over 150, 000 items. Most Commonwealth jurisdiction law reports can be found, including non-official and official reports. These include law reports from Australia, New Zealand, Canada, the United Kingdom, the Pacific Island regions, the United States and Europe. A relatively large staff run the library, helping students, organising books, carrying out repair work and supervision of the law library.

== Community Legal Services ==
Monash was among the first law schools in Australia to incorporate Community Legal Services into its teaching programs. Currently, the Faculty of Law runs two Community Legal Services. The Monash-Oakleigh Legal Service, which includes the Family Law Assistance Program, is located just outside the western border of the University's Clayton Campus. The Springvale Monash Legal Service, including the South East Centre Against Sexual Assault, is located in the South-Eastern Melbourne suburb of Springvale. The Springvale service is now the oldest continually running community legal service in Australia. Among the students who were first to participate in the program in 1973 include the current chief justice of Victoria Marilyn Warren and current chairman of the Australian Securities & Investments Commission (ASIC) Tony D'Aloisio.

These centres operate to provide free legal services and education to meet the needs of the community. They are supervised by full-time and part-time qualified legal practitioners, but are essentially run by law students at the Faculty of Law. Working at one of these centres for a semester or a summer is part of the Faculty of Law's Professional Practice units, which are credited towards the Bachelor of Laws. Student volunteers undertake a range of responsibilities, including interviewing clients, negotiating with other parties, letter drafting, preparing wills and court documents, and appearing in court on their client's behalf. Although most tasks are carried out by the students, they are under the supervision of practising solicitors. The centres provide legal advice in areas such as criminal law, employment law, debt and family law. They also produce publications on law reform.

Since the establishment of Community Legal Services in the early 1970s, similar programs have been introduced at other Australian law schools.

== Notable alumni ==
The Faculty of Law has produced a large number of prominent alumni across different areas of law, politics, business, academia, sport and the arts. The following is a selection of notable alumni:

Federal Court of Australia judges

- Stewart Anderson (2019–present)
- Mordy Bromberg (2009–present)
- Jennifer Davies (2013–present)
- Raymond Finkelstein AO (1997–2011)
- Christopher Jessup (2006–2017)
- Shane Marshall AM (1995–2015)
- Debra Mortimer (2013–present)
- Bernard Murphy (2011–present)
- Tony Pagone (2013–2018)

Victorian Court of Appeal judges

- David Beach (2008–present)
- Anne Ferguson, Chief Justice of Victoria (2017–present)
- Stephen Kaye AM (2003–present)
- Murray Kellam AO (1998–2009), also first president of the Victorian Civil and Administrative Tribunal
- Maree Kennedy (2016–present)
- Cameron Macaulay (2010–present)
- Richard Niall (2017–present), also Solicitor-General of Victoria (2015–2017)
- Pamela Tate (2010–present), also first female solicitor-general of Victoria (2003–2010)
- Marilyn Warren AC, first female chief justice of Victoria (2003–2017) and former lieutenant-governor of Victoria
- Mark Weinberg AO (2008–2018), also former chief justice of Norfolk Island and 2nd Commonwealth Director of Public Prosecutions (1988–1991)

Victorian Supreme Court judges

- Richard Attiwill (2021–present)
- Kevin Bell (2005–2020), also former president of the Victorian Civil and Administrative Tribunal
- Anthony Cavanough (2009–present)
- Matthew Connock (2019–present)
- Clyde Croft AM (2009–2019)
- Michael Croucher (2013–present)
- Jennifer Davies (2009–2013)
- Jane Dixon (2016–present)
- James Dudley Elliott (2013–present)
- James Judd (2008–2018)
- Andrew Keogh (2016–present)
- Lex Lasry AM (2007–2018)
- Steven Moore (2018–present)
- Stuart Morris (2003–2007), also former president of the Victorian Civil and Administrative Tribunal
- Lisa Nichols (2019–present)
- Tony Pagone (2007–2013)
- Jack Rush (2013–2016)
- Kathryn Stynes (2020–present)
- Andrew Tinney (2018–present)
- Andrea Tsalamandris (2022–present)

Judiciary of New South Wales

- Elizabeth Fullerton: Judge of the Supreme Court of New South Wales (2007–present)
- Simon Molesworth AO, QC: Acting Judge of the Land and Environment Court of New South Wales (2017–present), Vice Chancellor's Professorial Fellow at the Faculty of Law, Adjunct Professor of the La Trobe Institute for Social and Environmental Sustainability and chairman of the Australia Council of National Trusts

High Court of Hong Kong

- Kevin Zervos: Judge of Court of Appeal (2013–present)

Other judges

- Ken Barlow: Judge of the District Court of Queensland (2019–present)
- Anna Boymal: Judge of the Federal Circuit Court of Australia (2019–present)
- Diana Bryant: 3rd chief justice of the Family Court of Australia (2004–2017); former and first chief magistrate of the Federal Magistrates' Court of Australia
- Jennifer Coate: judge of the Family Court of Australia (2013–2019); state coroner of Victoria (2007–2013); first president of the Children's Court of Victoria (2000–2007)
- Julie Condon: judge of the County Court of Victoria (2017–2019)
- Paul Cronin: judge of the Family Court of Australia (2006–2019)
- Ronald Curtain: judge of the Federal Circuit Court of Australia (2012–present)
- Sarah Dawes: judge of the County Court of Victoria (2018–present)
- Kevin Doyle: judge of the County Court of Victoria (2019–present)
- Robert Dyer: judge of the County Court of Victoria (2014–present)
- Mandy Fox: judge of the County Court of Victoria (2018–present)
- Ian Gray: current state coroner of Victoria (2012–current), first president of the Children's Court of Victoria and Chief Magistrate of the Magistrates' Court of Victoria (2001–2012)
- Felicity Hampel: judge of the County Court of Victoria
- Lisa Hannan: chief magistrate of the Magistrates' Court of Victoria (2019–present)
- Justin Hannebery: judge of the County Court of Victoria (2020–present)
- Norah Hartnett: judge of the Family Court of Australia (2019–present)
- Scott Johns: judge of the County Court of Victoria (2018–present)
- Sharon Johns: judge of the Family Court of Australia (2013–present)
- Graeme Johnstone: state coroner of Victoria (1994–2007)
- Gregory Lyon: judge of the County Court of Victoria (2016–present)
- Kirsty Macmillan: judge of the Family Court of Australia (2011–present)
- Martine Marich: judge of the County Court of Victoria (2018–present)
- Patricia Matthews: associate judge of the Supreme Court of Victoria (2020–present)
- Alistair McNab: judge of the Federal Circuit Court of Australia (2016–present)
- Nahum Mushin AM: judge of the Family Court of Australia (1990–2011)
- Patrick O'Shannessy: judge of the Federal Circuit Court of Australia (2020–present)
- David Purcell: judge of the County Court of Victoria (2020–present)
- Claire Quin: judge of the County Court of Victoria (2013–present)
- Patricia Riddell: Judge of the County Court of Victoria (2017–present)
- Michael Rozenes AO: Chief Judge of the County Court of Victoria (2002–2015), also Commonwealth Director of Public Prosecutions (1992–1997)
- Christopher Ryan: Judge of the County Court of Victoria (2018–present)
- David Sexton: Judge of the County Court of Victoria (2018–present)
- Meryl Sexton: Judge of the County Court of Victoria (2001–present)
- Richard Smith: Judge of the County Court of Victoria (2013–present)
- Joanne Stewart: Judge of the Federal Circuit Court of Australia (2013–present)
- Christine Thornton: Judge of the Family Court of Australia (2013–2018)
- Jack Vandersteen: Judge of the County Court of Victoria and President of the Children's Court of Victoria (2021–present)
- Peter C. Young: Judge of the Family Court of Australia (2002–2013)

Other legal practitioners

- Greg Barns SC: barrister and human rights advocate
- Anna Brown: former director of Legal Advocacy at the Human Rights Law Centre
- Julian Burnside AO QC: prominent barrister, human rights advocate and author
- John Cain: Victorian Solicitor for Public Prosecutions and State Coroner
- Kristine Hanscombe QC: barrister specialising in public law
- Emily Madder: general counsel and company secretary of Siemens
- Ross Ray QC: prominent barrister and former president of the Law Council of Australia
- Neil Rees: former chairman of the Victorian Law Reform Commission, foundation dean of the University of Newcastle Law Faculty
- Julian McMahon AC QC: prominent barrister and human rights advocate
- David Vadiveloo: human rights advocate and screen producer
- Brian Walters AM QC: prominent barrister and advocate for human rights and the environment

Australian politics and government

- Jan Adams AO PSM: Australian Ambassador to Japan (October 2020–present) and Australian Ambassador to China (2016–2019)
- Richard Alston AO: President of the Liberal Party of Australia (2014–2017) and Australian High Commissioner to the United Kingdom (2005–2008)
- Kevin Andrews: Liberal minister and member of the Australian Parliament for Menzies (1991–present) and Father of the Australian House of Representatives (2016–present)
- Adam Bandt: Leader of the Australian Greens (2020–present) and member of the Australian Parliament for Melbourne
- Julia Banks: Liberal member of the Australian Parliament for Chisholm (2016–2019); General Counsel of Kraft Foods Australia (1992–2009), GlaxoSmithKline Australia (2009–2014) and George Weston Foods (2014–present)
- Mark Birrell: Liberal minister and member of the Victorian Legislative Council for the East Yarra Province (1983–2002)
- Peter Cleeland: Labor member of the Australian Parliament for McEwen (1984–1990)
- Peter Costello AC: longest-serving Treasurer of Australia (1996–2007) and former Deputy Leader of the Liberal Party of Australia
- Simon Crean: Leader of the Opposition and Australian Labor Party Leader (2001–2003)
- Will Fowles: Labor member of the Victorian Legislative Assembly for Burwood (2018–present)
- Josh Frydenberg: Treasurer of Australia and Deputy Leader of the Liberal Party of Australia (2018–2022)
- Deborah Glass: Victorian Ombudsman (2014–present)
- David Gray: Labor member of the Victorian Legislative Assembly for Electoral district of Syndal (1982–1985)
- Alan Griffiths: Labor member of the Australian Parliament for Division of Maribyrnong (1983–1996)
- Dianne Hadden: independent member of the Victorian Legislative Council (2004–2006)
- Jill Hennessy: 54th attorney-general of Victoria (2018–present)
- Sarah Henderson: Liberal senator for Victoria (2019–present)
- Graham Ihlein: Labor member of the Victorian Legislative Assembly for Sandringham (1982–1985)
- Michael Kroger: President of the Victorian Liberal Party (1987–2018)
- Julian Hill: Labor member of the Australian Parliament for Bruce (2016–present)
- John Lenders: Treasurer of Victoria (2007–2010)
- Tony Lupton: Victorian Cabinet Secretary (2007–2010)
- Clem Newton-Brown: Liberal member of the Victorian Legislative Assembly for Prahran
- David O'Brien: National member of the Victorian Legislative Council for the Western Victoria Region (2010–2014)
- Brendan O'Connor: Labor minister and member of the Australian Parliament (2004–present)
- Clare O'Neil: Labor member of the Australian Parliament for Hotham (2013–present); also youngest female mayor of a local government area in Australia's history
- Martin Pakula: Labor minister and member of the Victorian Legislative Assembly (2006–present), also 53rd attorney-general of Victoria (2014–2018)
- Victor Perton: Liberal member of the Victorian Legislative Assembly (1988–2006)
- Peter Reith: Liberal minister and member of the Australian Parliament for Flinders (1984–2001); Executive Director of the European Bank for Reconstruction and Development (2003–2009)
- Bill Shorten: Leader of the Australian Labor Party and Leader of the Opposition (2013–2019), former National Secretary, Australian Workers' Union and Victorian State ALP President
- Laura Smyth: Labor member of the Australian Parliament for La Trobe (2010–2013)
- Murray Thompson: Liberal member of the Victorian Legislative Assembly for Sandringham (1992–2018) and footballer for Richmond Football Club (1973–1976)
- John Thwaites: Deputy Premier of Victoria (1999–2007)
- Dean Wells: Attorney-General of Queensland (1989–1995)
- Steve Wettenhall: Labor member of the Queensland Parliament for Barron River (2006–2012)
- Gabrielle Williams: Labor minister and member of the Victorian Legislative Assembly (2014–present)
- Beth Wilson: Victorian Health Services Commissioner (1997–2012) and former president of Victoria's Mental Health Review Board
- Keith Wolahan: Liberal member of the Australian Parliament for Menzies

Non-Australian political figures

- Donald Betts: Democratic member of the Kansas Senate (2004–2009)
- Siswo Pramono: Indonesian Ambassador to Australia (2021–present)
- Peter Reith: Executive Director of the European Bank for Reconstruction and Development (2003–2009)
- Ambika Satkunanathan: Commissioner of the Human Rights Commission of Sri Lanka (2015–2020)
- M. A. Sumanthiran: member of the Parliament of Sri Lanka (2015–present)

Business

- Andrew Bassat: CEO and co-founder of Seek Limited
- Gidon Bromberg: director of EcoPeace Middle East
- Tony D'Aloisio: Chairman of the Australian Securities & Investments Commission (ASIC) (2007–2011) and managing director and CEO of the Australian Securities Exchange (2004–2006)
- Mina Guli: businesswoman and former deputy chairman of the Australian Chamber of Commerce and Industry in Beijing
- Tan Le: Technology entrepreneur, 1998 Young Australian of the Year
- Amanda McKenzie: CEO and co-founder of the Climate Council and environmental activist
- Liddy Nevile: technology pioneer and author
- Andrew Norton: director at the International Institute for Environment and Development
- Graeme Samuel AO: chairman of the Australian Competition & Consumer Commission (2003–2011)
- Carol Schwartz AO: Director of the Reserve Bank of Australia
- Jonathan Shier: managing director of the Australian Broadcasting Corporation (2000–2001)
- Anna Skarbek: businesswoman in the areas of environment and reduction of carbon emissions
- Alex Waislitz: prominent businessman and member of Collingwood Football Club board of directors

Academia

- Antony Anghie: Professor of Law at the National University of Singapore Faculty of Law and leading international law scholar
- Mark Aronson: Emeritus Professor at Melbourne Law School and the UNSW Faculty of Law and distinguished public law scholar
- Neil H. Buchanan: Professor at University of Florida Levin College of Law and tax law scholar
- Tim Costello AO: Director of World Vision Australia
- Clyde Croft AM: professor of law at the Faculty of Law
- Mick Dodson: 2009 Australian of the Year and convenor of the ANU Institute for Indigenous Australia
- Hugh Evans: Co-Founder of The Oaktree Foundation, Author and Philanthropist, 2004 Young Australian of the Year,
- Arie Freiberg: Emeritus Professor and former dean of the Faculty of Law (2004–2012)
- Robert Hayes: associate professor of law at Western Sydney University
- Peter Hogg QC: leading scholar on Canadian constitutional law
- Sarah Joseph: human rights scholar and director of the Castan Centre for Human Rights Law
- Rosemary Langford: associate professor of law at Melbourne Law School
- Ron McCallum: Emeritus Professor at the University of Sydney and foundation Blake Dawson Waldron Professor in Industrial Law at Sydney Law School
- Alexandra Phelan: faculty member and researcher at the Georgetown University School of Medicine
- Charles Robert Williams, Emeritus Professor at the Faculty of Law and criminal law scholar

Literature, media and the arts

- Tom Ballard: comedian and radio presenter at Triple J (2007–2013)
- John Burns: radio presenter and former Victorian Crown Prosecutor
- Elizabeth Eggleston: author, activist for Indigenous Australians and first doctoral candidate at the Faculty of Law
- Jon Faine AM: prominent Melbourne radio personality
- David Francis: award-winning novelist
- Vance Joy: award-winning singer and songwriter
- Elliot V. Kotek: award-winning producer, filmmaker, social impact entrepreneur and journalist
- Sarah Krasnostein: author and commentator on criminal law
- Gina Liano: barrister, television personality and star in The Real Housewives of Melbourne
- Campbell McComas: comedian and actor
- Charlie Pickering: comedian
- Elliot Perlman: writer, Three Dollars, The Reasons I Won't Be Coming), AFI Award winner
- Andrew Probyn: journalist at the Australian Broadcasting Corporation
- Aamer Rahman: comedian and member of Fear of a Brown Planet
- Sandra Sdraulig AM: chairman of the Adelaide Film Festival and the Adelaide Festival of Ideas
- Nick Russell: actor and producer
- John Spooner: author and journalist
- Matt Tilley: comedian and radio personality
- Jane Turner OAM: actress, comedian and Logie Award-winning comedy writer, co-star of Kath & Kim
- Andrew Wailes: conductor, music director and former president of the Australian Intervarsity Choral Festival
- Wendy Zukerman: science journalist and podcaster

Sport

- Brendon Gale: footballer for Richmond Football Club (1990–2001); chief executive officer of Richmond Football Club (2009–present)
- Anna Millward (née Wilson): cyclist, two-time world champion (1999 and 2001)
- Dean Kino: former Cricket Australia administrator
- Peter Moore: footballer for Collingwood Football Club (1974–1982) and Melbourne Football Club (1983–1987), and dual Brownlow Medallist
- Bo Nixon: footballer for Collingwood Football Club (2004) and Hawthorn Football Club (2005)
- Ian Prendergast: general counsel and chief commercial officer of Carlton Football Club and footballer for the same club (2001–2006)
- Daniel Trenton: Australian taekwondo champion and silver medallist at the 2000 Summer Olympics in Sydney
- Peter Winter: decathlete and silver medallist at the 1994 Commonwealth Games in Canada

== Notable academic staff ==
Notable academic staff at the Faculty of Law, past and present, include:

- Jean Allain: professor of international law and expert on modern slavery
- Bob Baxt AO: scholar and solicitor in commercial law, former chairman of the Trade Practices Commission (now the ACCC), former dean of the Faculty of Law
- Maureen Brunt AO: distinguished economist
- Enid Campbell AC: scholar in constitutional law and administrative law.
- Stephen Charles AO: former justice of the Supreme Court of Victoria, adjunct professor at the Faculty of Law
- Clyde Croft AM: former justice of the Supreme Court of Victoria
- Sir Daryl Dawson AC KBE: former justice of the High Court of Australia
- Nadirsyah Hosen: internationally known as an expert on Indonesian law and Shari'a law
- Raymond Finkelstein AO: former justice of the Federal Court of Australia
- Ian Freckelton: adjunct professor of law
- Robert French AC: former chief justice of the High Court of Australia, adjunct professor at the Faculty of Law
- Arie Freiberg AM: emeritus professor and former dean of the Faculty of Law and chairman of the Victorian Sentencing Advisory Council
- Jeffrey Goldsworthy AM: emeritus professor at the Faculty of Law, legal philosopher and constitutional law scholar
- Peter Gray AM: former judge of the Federal Court of Australia, adjunct professor at the Faculty of Law
- George Hampel AM QC: former justice of the Supreme Court of Victoria; advocacy instructor
- Felicity Hampel: judge of the County Court of Victoria
- Peter Heerey AM: former judge of the Federal Court of Australia
- Nadirsyah Hosen: expert on Islamic law and Senior Lecturer at the Faculty of Law
- Christopher Jessup: former judge of the Federal Court of Australia and adjunct professor at the Faculty of Law
- Sarah Joseph: constitutional law and human rights law scholar, director of the Castan Centre for Human Rights Law
- Hoong Phun Lee: Sir John Latham Professor of Law and former Deputy Dean at the Faculty of Law
- Nahum Mushin AM: adjunct professor at the Faculty of Law, Judge of the Family Court of Australia (1990–2011)
- Marcia Neave AO: former judge of the Supreme Court of Victoria
- Jeremy Rapke QC: former Victorian Director of Public Prosecutions
- Louis Waller AO: emeritus professor at the Faculty of Law and criminal law scholar
- Wickrema Weerasooria: High Commissioner to Australia and New Zealand (1986–1990)
- Charles Robert Williams, emeritus professor at the Faculty of Law and criminal law scholar
- Christopher Weeramantry: former judge and vice-president of the International Court of Justice
