= History of Monash University =

Monash University is an Australian university located in Melbourne, Australia with some international campuses. It was established by an act of the state parliament of Victoria in 1958 as a result of the Murray Report which was commissioned in 1957 by the then Prime Minister Sir Robert Menzies to establish the second university in the state of Victoria.

== Early history ==
Monash University is a commissioned Victorian university. It was established by the Monash University Act 1958 (No. 6184 (Vic)) as a result of the Murray Report which was commissioned in 1957 by the then Prime Minister Sir Robert Menzies to establish the second university in the state of Victoria. The university was named after the prominent Australian general Sir John Monash. This was the first time in Australia that a university had been named after a person, rather than a city or state.

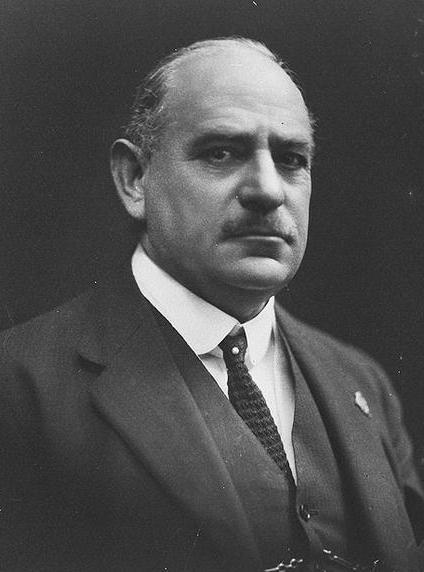
The University's eponym, Sir John Monash

The original campus was in the south-eastern Melbourne suburb of Clayton (falling in what is now the City of Monash). The first University Council, led by Monash's first Chancellor Sir Robert Blackwood, selected a British professor of engineering, Sir Louis Matheson, to be the first Vice-Chancellor of Monash University, a position he held until 1976. The University was granted an expansive site of 115 hectares of land at Clayton, after it had argued that, in the distant future, it was possible that Monash would have up to 12,000 students.

From its first intake of 347 students at Clayton on 13 March 1961, the university grew rapidly in size and student numbers so that by 1967, it had enrolled more than 21,000 students since its establishment. It was originally intended to have an emphasis on science and technology. However, it quickly expanded beyond this. In its early years, it offered undergraduate and postgraduate degrees in engineering, medicine, science, arts, economics and politics, education and law. Initially, it was best known for its strong research capacity in the sciences and for its innovative teaching in law and medicine. Along with the University of New South Wales and the Australian National University, it also attracted interest for its focus on Asia. Along with UNSW, it was the major provider for international student places under the Colombo Plan, which saw the first Asian students enter the Australian education system.

In its early years of teaching, research and administration, Monash had the advantage of no entrenched traditional practices. This enabled it to adopt modern approaches without resistance from those who preferred the status quo. Matheson had also deliberately selected young, talented staff to fuel the rapid rise of the University. A modern administrative structure was set up, Australia's first research centres and scholarships devoted to Indigenous Australians were established, and, thanks to Monash's entirely new facilities, students in wheelchairs were able to enroll. By contrast, Melbourne University struggled to enter the modern educational era, to the point that there was talk of a Royal Commission to overcome its antiquated style.

In other respects, however, the youth of Monash was a burden. While Louis Matheson had good relations with government, Monash in the 1960s existed in a city where almost all professionals had attended Melbourne University; this meant that many officials and heads of professional bodies were "unsympathetic" to Monash's requests. For example, it was many years before the Faculty of Medicine received funding for Monash Medical Centres to complement its teaching and research.

== 1970s onwards ==
From the mid-1960s to the early 1970s, Monash became the centre of student radicalism in Australia. It was the site of many mass student demonstrations, particularly concerning Australia's role in Vietnam War and conscription. The origins of mass student demonstrations in Melbourne were those against capital punishment, and some of the largest protests occurred at Monash in the final years before it was abolished in Victoria. By the late 1960s, several student organisations, some of which were influenced by or supporters of communism, turned their focus to Vietnam, with numerous blockades and sit-ins. In 1971, for example, over 4500 students—a substantial proportion of the Monash student population at the time—carried out a blockade on University Council chambers. The student meetings held at Monash during this time remain the largest in Australia's history. In May 1969, one meeting saw over 6,000 gather to vote against a disciplinary statute passed by the University Council. The most famous student radical was Albert Langer, who regularly made newspaper headlines and caused major disruptions at the Clayton Campus. So great was publicity surrounding the protests that many in Australia and around the world first heard of Monash not because of its teaching and research, but because of its protests. In one extraordinary event that came to be known as the Monash Siege, students forced then Prime Minister Malcolm Fraser to hide in a basement at the Alexander Theatre, in a major protest over the Whitlam dismissal. In recent years, student radicalism has died down, although there have been occasional protests on government higher education policy.

In the late 1970s and 1980s, Monash's most publicised research came through its pioneering of in-vitro fertilisation (IVF). Led by Professors Carl Wood and Alex Lopata, the Monash IVF Program achieved the world's first early IVF pregnancy in 1973. In 1980, the first IVF baby in Australia was born at the Royal Women's Hospital in Melbourne as a result of the work of Alex Lopata and Ian Johnston. This eventually became a massive source of revenue for the University at a time when university funding in Australia was beginning to slow down. In addition to the Medicine Faculty's work in IVF, Monash academics shaped the practice in other ways. Professor Louis Waller of the Law School created the model IVF legislation adopted in Victoria, and philosophers Peter Singer and Helga Kuhse led the world in their consideration of the ethical implications of IVF, establishing the Centre for Human Bioethics in 1980.

== Expansion in the 1990s ==
In the late 1980s, the Dawkins Reforms changed the landscape of higher education in Australia. All Australian universities either sought to expand and consolidate their teaching and research bases, or merged with larger institutions. Under the leadership of Vice-Chancellor Mal Logan, Monash transformed dramatically. In 1988, Monash University had only one campus, Clayton, with around 15,000 students. Just over a decade later, it had 8 campuses (including 2 overseas), a European research and teaching centre, and more than 50,000 students, making it the largest and most internationalised Australian university.

The expansion began in 1990, with a series of mergers between Monash, the Chisholm Institute of Technology, the Gippsland Institute of Advanced Education. In 1991, Monash, to the surprise of many, merged with the Victorian College of Pharmacy, which most people had predicted would merge with the University of Melbourne. Monash University's expansion continued in 1994, with the establishment of the Berwick Campus. So great was the University's expansion that it was reported at the time that Monash might attempt a takeover of La Trobe University, but this did not happen.

In 1998, the University opened the Malaysia Campus, its first overseas campus and the first foreign university in Malaysia, after a longstanding presence in South East Asia. In 2001, the Johannesburg Campus opened its doors, making Monash the first foreign university in South Africa. The same year, the University secured an 18th-century Tuscan Palace to open a research and teaching centre in Prato, Italy. This expansion made Monash one of the world's most internationalised universities, but in fact the University administrators in the late 1990s contemplated going even further than they did. They explored the possibility of, and devoted much energy to, opening campuses in Thailand, Laos and Indonesia, but these plans were not followed through. While the University has established the IITB-Monash Research Academy with the Indian Institute of Technology Bombay, and has made its international focus explicit, it has stated that no further large-scale international campuses are planned within the next few years. Monash has also established study and research exchange links with over 120 partner universities around the world.

At the same time, Australian universities faced unprecedented demand for international student places, which Monash met on a larger scale than most, to the point that today around 30% of its students are from outside Australia. Today, Monash students come from over 100 different countries, and speak over 90 different languages. The increase in international students, combined with its expansion, meant that Monash's income skyrocketed throughout the 1990s, and it is now one of Australia's top 200 exporters.

== 2000 onwards ==
In recent years, the University has been particularly prominent in medical research. A highlight of this came in 2000, when Professor Alan Trounson led the team of scientists which first announced to the world that nerve stem cells could be derived from embryonic stem cells, a discovery which led to a dramatic increase in interest in the potential of stem cells. To capitalise on its medical research capacity, the University has been awarded hundreds of millions of dollars in funding to develop large research facilities at its Clayton Campus. In 2006, the University began developing the $138 million Australian Regenerative Medicine Institute, which will be one of the largest stem cell research centres in the world when it opens in 2008. In addition to this, the University now houses the Australian Stem Cell Centre, Nanotechnology Victoria Limited (NanoVic), Stem Cell Sciences Limited and the largest monoclonal antibody production facility in the Southern Hemisphere. Such developments have made Monash the main location of stem cell research in Australia. It has also led to Monash being ranked in the top 20 universities in the world for biomedicine. In 2010, the John Monash Science School, Victoria's first specialist select-entry high school for students gifted in maths, science and technology, opened at the Clayton Campus.

On 21 October 2002, Huan Yun "Allen" Xiang shot two people dead and injured five others on the Clayton campus.

The current vice-chancellor of Monash University is Professor Margaret Gardner. On 30 May 2008, Monash University celebrated its 50th anniversary.
