= Ian Ramsay =

Academic lawyer

Professor Ian Ramsay AO
- Born: Ian Malcolm Ramsay; 7 October 1958 (age 67); Sydney, New South Wales
- Education: Macquarie University, Harvard Law School
- Occupation: academic lawyer
- Employer: University of Melbourne
- Website: www.law.unimelb.edu.au Staff Profile; SSRN

Professor Ian Ramsay AO (born 7 October 1958) is Redmond Barry Distinguished Professor Emeritus, Melbourne Law School and a former director of their Centre for Corporate Law and Securities Regulation in Melbourne, Australia. He is an academic lawyer, author, and prominent media commentator on corporate law and securities law issues in Australia.

== Early life and education ==
Ian Malcolm Ramsay was born 7 October 1958 in Sydney. He completed his secondary education at Killara High School, Sydney.

He matriculated to Macquarie University and in 1983 was graduated Bachelor of Arts and Bachelor of Laws with Honours.

He completed a Master of Laws at Harvard Law School.

== Career ==
Ramsay began his legal career with the Law Reform Commission of New South Wales in 1982 where he was a legal officer until 1984.

He moved to New York where he was an associate in Sullivan & Cromwell between 1985 and 1987.

On his return to Australia, he joined King & Wood Mallesons as an employed solicitor from 1987 to 1989.

In 1989, he joined the Faculty of Law at the University of New South Wales as a lecturer, promoted to senior lecturer in 1992. He served as Associate Dean in the Faculty of Law from 1993 to 1994 whilst continuing to lecture and research.

In 1994, he was made Harold Ford Professor of Commercial Law at the University of Melbourne's Faculty of Law. He was Dean of the Faculty of Law from 2002 to 2003.

== Boards and Appointments ==
Professor Ramsay has been a member of the Australian Takeovers Panel since 2000.

He has been a member of the Corporations and Markets Advisory Committee since 2002, the Companies Auditors and Liquidators Disciplinary Board since 2004 and the Audit Quality Review Board since 2006.

Ramsay was appointed Officer of the Order of Australia (AO) in the 2023 Australia Day Honours for "distinguished service to the law, to regulatory bodies, to tertiary education, and to law reform".

== Publications ==
Ramsay has published numerous articles and books which include:

- Education and the Law (with A. Shorten) (1996)
- Corporate Governance and the Duties of Company Directors (editor) (1997)
- Securities Regulation (co-editor) (1998)
- Company Directors' Liability for Insolvent Trading (editor) (2000)
- Commercial Applications of Company Law in Malaysia (jointly) (2002)
- Commercial Applications of Company Law in New Zealand (jointly) (2002)
- Key Developments in Corporate Law and Trusts Law (editor) (2002)
- Experts' Reports in Corporate Transactions (jointly) (2003)
- Company Directors: Principles of Law and Corporate Governance (2nd ed., 2023)
- Ford's Principles of Corporations Law (jointly) (17th ed., 2018)
- Commercial Applications of Company Law (jointly) (23rd ed., 2022)

His co-authors include Robert Austin (judge), Bob Baxt, Pamela Hanrahan and Rosemary Langford.

== Personal life ==
Ramsay married Megan Scannell on 8 August 1987. They have a son and a daughter.
