= James Judd (disambiguation) =

James Judd (born 1949) is a British conductor.

James Judd may also refer to:

- James Judd (judge), Australian judge
- James Judd (legislator) (1884–1961), American legislator from Utah and leader in The Church of Jesus Christ of Latter-day Saints
