= Baxt (surname) =

Baxt is a surname. Notable people with the surname include:

- Bob Baxt (1938–2018), Australian lawyer
- George Baxt (1923–2003), American screenwriter and author of crime fiction
