= David Derham =

Australian jurist and university administrator

Sir David Plumley Derham KBE CMG (13 May 1920 – 1 September 1985) was an Australian jurist and university administrator. He was an expert in Australian constitutional law. In 1963, he became the Foundation Dean of Monash University Law School, which is now called the David Derham School of Law in his honour.

== Early life and education ==
Derham was born in Australia in 1920, the son of Alfred Plumley Derham CBE MC, an Australian soldier and doctor, and Frances Derham MBE, an Australian lecturer in art. He was educated at Trinity Grammar School, Kew and Scotch College, Melbourne. David Derham served for four years in the Australian Imperial Force in World War II, before going on to complete a Bachelor of Arts and a Bachelor of Laws at the University of Melbourne as a resident of Ormond College in 1947. He graduated first in his year level, winning the Supreme Court Prize.

== Career ==
Derham practised briefly as a barrister, before being appointed Independent Lecturer in Constitutional Law at Melbourne University. In 1951, he was made Professor of Jurisprudence. He served in this position for twelve years, and in 1963 he was approached to become Foundation Dean of the forthcoming new law school, Monash. On 14 October 1963, Monash University's Council was informed that Derham had accepted the position.

Derham's appointment at Monash was crucial for the law school. Because Derham was so highly regarded in the legal profession, Monash ensured that its new faculty would immediately gain a good reputation and have the confidence of the community. The University's Vice-Chancellor, Louis Matheson, had been eager to find a Dean with extensive experience and respect in legal and academic circles. Derham satisfied these criteria in abundance.

Although Derham was required to continue teaching at Melbourne University until 1964, he immediately set to work on establishing an original curriculum for Monash. His links with the legal profession meant that a wide range of barristers, solicitors and judges assisted him through committees investigating various elements of the establishment of a new law school. The final program he established at Monash was radically different from the course he had previously overseen at Melbourne. The Monash Bachelor of Laws emphasised the need for law graduates to learn transferable legal skills, rather than merely learning the law itself. He also introduced small-group teaching.

On 1 March 1968, Derham was appointed Vice-Chancellor of Melbourne University, a position he held until 1982.

In addition to his work as a university administrator, Derham was well known for his wide-ranging legal publications. He also advised the Australian Government on a range of issues concerning the legal system, most notably the administration of justice in Papua New Guinea (which was an Australian Territory until the 1970s).

== Awards ==
Derham received a number of awards recognising his outstanding contribution to legal education. In addition to his knighthood, he was awarded honorary doctorates in law from both Monash and Melbourne universities.

== Personal life ==
According to those who knew him, Derham was a warm, energetic and charming friend. Derham died in Melbourne in 1985, leaving behind his wife and children.

Academic offices
Preceded by Sir George Paton	Vice-Chancellor of the University of Melbourne; 1968–1982	Succeeded by David Caro
