= Sarah Joseph =

Sarah Joseph may refer to:

- Sarah Joseph (author) (born 1946), Malayalam-language author from India
- Sarah Joseph (editor) (born 1971), former CEO and editor of Muslim lifestyle magazine emel
- Sarah Joseph (legal academic), Australian human rights scholar
