= Kim Hargrave =

Australian judge

Kim William Spencer Hargrave (born 30 September 1954) is a justice of the Court of Appeal of the Supreme Court of Victoria.

Hargrave was appointed to the trial division of the Supreme Court in 2005, and was appointed to the Court of Appeal in 2017.

He attended Brighton Grammar School and graduated from the University of Melbourne. He was admitted to the bar in 1980 and was appointed Queen's Counsel in 1995.

Hargrave is married to a fellow judge, Anne Ferguson, previously the Chief Justice of Victoria.
