= FOABP =

FOABP may stand for:

- Fear of a Black Planet, third studio album by Public Enemy.
- Fear of a Blank Planet, ninth studio album by Porcupine Tree.
- Fear of a Brown Planet, Australian stand-up comedy duo.
