= Bryan Horrigan =

Australian legal academic (born 1962)

- Born: 1962 (age 63–64); Brisbane, Queensland, Australia
- Occupation: Professor of Law at Monash University

Bryan Horrigan (born 1962) is an Australian legal academic and a past Dean of the Faculty of Law at Monash University in Australia. He previously held positions at Monash University as the Louis Waller Chair in Law and Associate Dean (Research). Formerly a senior associate and long-standing consultant with an international law firm, he holds a doctorate in law from Oxford University under a Rhodes Scholarship.

== Education ==
Horrigan was born in Brisbane, Queensland, Australia. He was educated at St. Joseph's College, Gregory Terrace (Brisbane) and the University of Queensland (BA, LLB), where he was awarded a Rhodes Scholarship. He was subsequently awarded a D. Phil. in Law from University College, Oxford.

== Career ==
Horrigan served as Dean of the Faculty of Law at Monash University from 2013 to 2024, making him the longest-serving current law dean in Victoria. He previously held roles at Monash as the Louis Waller Chair in Law and Associate Dean (Research), following academic positions at Queensland University of Technology and the University of Canberra. He succeeded Arie Freiberg as Dean and was followed by Marilyn Pittard as Interim Dean in March 2024.

As Dean, he was part of the Vice-Chancellor’s executive committee and the Monash–Penn State Alliance Steering Committee. He also served on the boards of the Cranlana Centre for Ethical Leadership and Monash South Africa.

In 2010, he was appointed to a federal expert panel on unconscionable conduct and franchising, whose reforms led to changes in national economic regulation. He also contributed to the Finkel Review on energy policy and advised on legal frameworks for corporate climate change responsibilities.

== Core expertise ==
Bryan's research has been cited by the Queensland Court of Appeal, senior judges, parliamentary and regulatory reports, law reform proposals, and academic publications. He has spoken and published internationally on topics including international law, judicial decision-making, public governance, corporate social responsibility, unconscionable conduct, and good faith in commerce.

His 2010 book, Corporate Social Responsibility in the 21st Century, published by Edward Elgar, is frequently cited.

== Achievements ==
As Dean, Horrigan led a range of major initiatives that significantly advanced Monash Law. He established new named professorial chairs in criminal and corporate law and introduced Australia’s first and only Clinical Guarantee, ensuring every commencing law student could participate in a real-world legal clinic to support access to justice. He oversaw the creation of a moot court and expanded the faculty to include former high-level judges from Victoria and beyond. Under his leadership, the Faculty also launched key projects, including a human rights conference co-hosted with the Supreme Court of Victoria, the Open Justice Project in collaboration with the Victorian Bar, the Eleos Justice initiative on capital punishment in partnership with the Capital Punishment Justice Project and supported by Australian Government funding, and a commercial law seminar series delivered jointly with the Victorian Supreme Court, Federal Court of Australia, and leading legal professional bodies.

== Publications ==
=== Contributor ===
Horrigan has contributed chapters to the following academic and professional texts:

- 1994. Enforcing Securities
- 1994. Foreign Investment in Australia
- 1995. Equity: Issues and Trends
- 1996. Interpreting Constitutions
- 1997. Commercial Implications of Native Title
- 1998. Government Law and Policy: Commercial Aspects (ed., contrib.)
- 1999. Corporatisation and Privatisation in Australia
- 1999. Guarantees and Solicitors' Certificates
- 2001. Human Rights and Commercial Law
- 2002. Oxford Companion to the High Court of Australia
- 2003. From Bureaucracy to Business Enterprise
- 2005. Handbook of Corporate Legal Responsibility

=== Author ===
- 2000. Horrors' Hints: Helpful Hints on the Theory and Practice of Legal Research and Analysis for Students, Academics and Practitioners
  Faculty of Law, Kelvin Grove, Qld.: Queensland University of Technology, ISBN 978-1-86435-474-4 (pbk.)
- 2003. Adventures in Law and Justice: Exploring Big Legal Questions in Everyday Life
  Law at Large, Sydney: University of New South Wales Press, ISBN 978-0-86840-572-8 (pbk.), "a down-to-earth explanation of topical and newsworthy law-and-justice dilemmas".
- 2008. Corporate Social Responsibility in the 21st Century: Debates, Models and Practices Across Government, Law and Business
  Cheltenham, UK & Northampton, MA: Edward Elgar Publishing, ISBN 978-1-84542-956-0 (hbk.), ISBN 978-1-84720-835-4 (pbk.)
