= Raymond Finkelstein =

Australian lawyer and judge

The Honourable Ray Finkelstein AO KC

Judge of the Federal Court of Australia
- In office 21 July 1997 – 30 June 2011

Personal details
- Born: Roman Antony Finkelstein; 16 July 1946 (age 80) Munich, Germany
- Citizenship: Australian
- Spouse: Leonie Thompson
- Education: Elwood High School
- Alma mater: Monash University
- Profession: Barrister

Raymond Antony Finkelstein AO KC (born 16 July 1946) is an Australian lawyer and judge. From 1997 until 2011, he served as a judge of the Federal Court of Australia. His judgments were highly influential in commercial law, giving rise to new approaches in insolvency, competition law and class actions.

== Early life and education ==
Finkelstein was born in Munich, Germany in July 1946. His father, Wolf Finkelstein, grew up in Poland, near the border with Ukraine. The Second World War led Wolf Finkelstein to Germany, where he met fellow Pole Lisa Altstock. In 1951, as stateless Jews, the family came to Melbourne by boat.

Finkelstein's secondary education was at Elwood High School, where he was reportedly a rebellious and disobedient student. In 1965, he was accepted to study at Monash University, where he obtained a Bachelor of Jurisprudence and a Bachelor of Laws. Finkelstein was a teaching fellow at Monash University Law School from 1974 to 1975.

== Career ==
In 1975 Finkelstein began practicing as a barrister at the Victorian bar. He shared chambers with fellow Jews Ron Castan, Alan Goldberg and Ron Merkel. It was first dubbed "Bankruptcy Chambers", then "Golan Heights" and eventually became one of Australia's busiest commercial practices. He was made a Queen's Counsel in 1986. In 1992, he served for one year as acting Solicitor-General of Victoria.

Finkelstein was appointed as a judge of the Federal Court of Australia on 21 July 1997. By that point, his colleagues Goldberg and Merkel were also on the bench. It made Melbourne a hub for corporate law litigation. At one point in time, around 90% of corporate cases in the Federal Court were listed in Victoria.

He has presided over a number of notable cases, including the civil hearing of prominent Australian businessman Steve Vizard, in which he increased the sentence proposed in the Agreed Statement of Facts by both ASIC and Vizard to a $390,000 fine and a ban from holding company directorships for ten years. His judgment of Vizard attracted widespread media attention, but was widely misunderstood as the matter was a civil hearing, involving the review by the Court of an Agreed Statement of Facts The head of ASIC, Jeff Lucy, later conceded that much of the media outrage was caused by ASIC's failure to properly communicate the full facts to the media.

The mistake we made with the Vizard communication was that we did not adequately address the reaction to what we were putting to the public by the media…Our investigation was thorough. We came to a view, which was of course based on the admissible evidence, that a criminal prosecution would not be successful. Having said that, there was no doubt that there was some quite significant media issues for ASIC and indeed myself as chairman. We were not as well prepared for those as we should have been, and because the matter was before the court, our opportunity to correct the record was very significantly reduced. The Vizard case provided a number of lessons for us, and hopefully we have dealt with our communications with the media a lot more effectively since.

Finkelstein has been described as "independent, full of ideas, and unpredictable", often drawing on practices from other jurisdictions to inform the court's ruling, both procedural and substantive. He was also President of the Australian Competition Tribunal.

=== Independent media inquiry ===
Finkelstein headed the Independent Media Inquiry, starting from 14 September 2011, which examined the Australian media industry's regulatory framework. The inquiry reported its findings back to the federal government on 28 February 2012.

== Views on judicial activism ==
In 2003, Finkelstein entered into the debate on judicial activism in a journal article published in the Monash University Law Review, in which he stated that, while he opposes judges acting as "ad hoc legislators", it is naïve to think that a judge's background, education, heritage and personal ethical views do not influence their decisions.
