= Debra Mortimer =

Australian judge

The Honourable Chief Justice Debra Mortimer

Chief Justice of the Federal Court of Australia
- Incumbent
- Assumed office 7 April 2023
- Appointed by: David Hurley
- Preceded by: James Allsop

Judge of the Federal Court of Australia
- Incumbent
- Assumed office 12 July 2013

Personal details
- Born: Debra Sue Mortimer Auckland, New Zealand
- Education: Kelston Girls' High School
- Alma mater: University of Auckland; Monash University
- Occupation: Judge, Lawyer

Debra Sue Mortimer is an Australian judge who has been the Chief Justice of the Federal Court of Australia since 7 April 2023. She was born in New Zealand but has practised law in Australia. She has been a judge of the Federal Court of Australia since 2013, having previously been a Senior Counsel practising at the Victorian Bar in migration law, environmental law and anti-discrimination law.

== Early life and education ==
Debra Mortimer was raised outside of Auckland, New Zealand. Her father worked as a bookbinder in Auckland. Mortimer went to school at Kelston Girls' High School in Auckland, and she spent her final year abroad in Sri Lanka. She studied arts and jurisprudence at the University of Auckland before transferring to Monash University, where she graduated with a Bachelor of Jurisprudence in 1985 and a Bachelor of Laws with 1st Class Honours in 1987. Debra Mortimer was an Editor of the Monash University Law Review in 1985 and 1986.

== Career ==
Mortimer did her articles at Goldberg and Window Solicitors before becoming an associate to Sir Gerard Brennan, then a justice of the High Court of Australia in 1988 and 1989. Mortimer became a barrister in 1989 and was appointed as a Senior Counsel in 2003. It was unusual for women to have a speaking role as advocates before the High Court; however, Mortimer was an exception, regularly appearing in the High Court from 1998 until her elevation as a judge. Her appearances included for the successful applicants in Plaintiff M61/2010E v Commonwealth, and Plaintiff M70/2011 v Minister for Immigration and Citizenship. Mortimer also appeared in environmental cases, including representing Bob Brown, an Australian Greens Senator, in a case against Forestry Tasmania, concerning the Wielangta forest.

As well as an active practice as a barrister, Mortimer was a lecturer in the Monash University Faculty of Law from 1991 to 1994 and at the University of Melbourne Law School from 2011.

Since her elevation to the Federal Court, Mortimer has been the trial judge in a number of high-profile cases, including Wotton v Queensland (No 5), a case concerning the events following the 2004 death in custody of Palm Island, Queensland resident, Cameron Doomadgee. Mortimer found that members of the Queensland Police Service had contravened the Racial Discrimination Act, including the way they had investigated the death in custody, that an emergency declaration and the deployment of the Special Emergency Response Team was part of an excessive and disproportionate policing response. Mortimer was the trial judge in a case brought by Consumer Affairs Victoria against wellness blogger Belle Gibson and her companies for misleading or deceptive conduct and unconscionable conduct contrary to the Australian Consumer Law. Gibson was required to pay $410,000 in penalties.

Mortimer has also sat as a member of the Full Court of the Federal Court hearing appeals, and was a member of the bench that was critical of the approach of Judge Alexander Street in hearing applications by asylum seekers.

In 2018 Mortimer presided over an historic judgement resulting in an Indigenous land use agreement, after a claim brought by Kaurna elders in Adelaide 18 years earlier. This was the first claim for a first land use agreement to be agreed to in any Australian capital city.

On 25 November 2021, Justice Mortimer presided over a sitting at the Federal Court in Cairns that awarded 2,188 km^{2} (845 sq mi) of land on the eastern side of Cape York Peninsula to the Kuuku Ya'u and Uutaalnganu peoples, in a native title claim that was lodged seven years prior.

On 31 March 2023 it was announced that she will be elevated to be Chief Justice of the Court from 7 April 2023.

== See also ==
- List of judges of the Federal Court of Australia

Legal offices
Preceded by James Allsop	Chief Justice of the Federal Court of Australia; 2023–present	Incumbent
