= Jean Allain =

Canadian-born Australian legal scholar and author

Jean Allain (born in Canada, 1965) is a legal scholar, author, professor at Monash University and from 2017 to 2021 had a concurrent position at the University of Hull; since 2008 has been extraordinary professor at the University of Pretoria, and from 2015 to 2019 special advisor to Anti-Slavery International. He is known for his pioneering work on modern slavery.

== Life and work ==
Allain was born and grew up in Canada. He completed his master's thesis at the Inter-American Court of Human Rights in San José, Costa Rica, and received his doctorate at the Graduate Institute of International Studies.

He became professor of public international law and director of the Human Rights Center at Queen's University Belfast. From 1998 to 2004, he taught at the American University in Cairo, Egypt. He subsequently became professor of public international law at the Wilberforce Institute for the study of Slavery and Emancipation at the University of Hull, and associate professor at the Center for Human Rights at the University of Pretoria, South Africa. Since 2015, he has been special advisor to Anti-Slavery International, the world's oldest human rights organization.

He is now also professor of law at Monash University Faculty of Law in Melbourne, Australia and associate of the university's Castan Center. He was also appointed visiting professor at the Beijing Pedagogical University from 2017 to 2020.

Allain is a generalist in the field of international law, specializing in human rights. His work focuses on modern slavery and human trafficking. The 2012 book The Legal Understanding of Slavery, From the Historical to the Contemporary, which he edited, is considered the most comprehensive account of the Bellagio-Harvard Guidelines on the Legal Parameters of Slavery regarding the concept of slavery and its interpretation in law. In 2008, the High Court of Australia established the legal applicability of the 1926 definition of slavery to contemporary situations on the basis of these guidelines.

In 2016, a ruling by the Inter-American Court of Human Rights made extensive use of Allain's expertise on slavery and forced labor and the concept of modern slavery.

Allain has acted in an advisory capacity for the International Labour Organization, the Organization for Security and Cooperation in Europe and the United Nations High Commissioner for Refugees.

== Publications ==
=== Books ===
- The Law and Slavery: Prohibiting Human Exploitation, Martinus Nijhoff Publishers, 2012. ISBN 978-9004-27988-9
- Slavery in International Law: Of Human Exploitation and Trafficking, Martinus Nijhoff Publishers, 2012. ISBN 978-9004-18695-8
- The Slavery Conventions: The Travaux Préparatoires of the 1926 League of Nations Convention and the 1956 United Nations Convention (The Travaux Préparatoires Of Multilateral Treaties), Brill–Nijhoff, 2008. ISBN 978-9004-15861-0
- International Law in the Middle East: Closer to Power than Justice, Aldershot, Ashgate Publishing Ltd, 2004.
- A Century of International Adjudication: The Rule of Law and its Limits, T.M.C. Asser Press, 2000, ISBN 978-9067041256

=== Publications as editor ===
- Ting Xu (Autor, Hrsg.), Jean Allain (Hrsg.): Property and Human Rights in a Global Context (Human Rights Law in Perspective), Hart Publishing, 2016. ISBN 978-1849-46726-1
- Jean Allain (Hrsg.): The Legal Understanding of Slavery, From the Historical to the Contemporary, Oxford University Press, 2012, ISBN 978-0199-66046-9
- Jean Allain (Hrsg.), Siobhán Mullally (Hrsg.): The Irish Yearbook of International Law, Band 3, 2008. ISBN 978-1847-31628-8

=== Article (selection) ===
- The White Slave Traffic in International Law, Journal of Trafficking and Human Exploitation, Band 1, 2017, S. 1–40
- The Definition of Slavery into the Twenty-First Century, in Jean Allain J (Hrsg.), The Legal Understanding of Slavery: From the Historical to the Contemporary, S. 253–280, 2012, Oxford University Press
- Nineteenth Century Law of the Sea and the British Abolition of the Slave Trade, British Yearbook of International Law, Band 78, 2008, S. 342–388
- Orientalism and International Law: the Middle East as Underclass of the International Legal Order, Leiden Journal of International Law, Band 17, Nr. 2, Juni 2004, S. 391–404. doi:10.1017/S0922156504001864
- mit John R.W.D. Jones: A Patchwork of Norms, A Commentary on the 1996 Draft Code of Crimes against the Peace and Security of Mankind, European Journal of International Law, Band 8, Nr. 1, 1997, S. 115
