= Louis Waller =

Australian legal scholar (1935-2019)

Peter Louis Waller AO FASSA FAAL (10 February 1935 – 8 October 2019) was an Australian jurist. He was particularly well known for his work in evidence, medical and criminal law. He was Sir Leo Cussen Professor of Law at Monash University from 1965 until 2000, and thereafter Emeritus Professor. From 1968 to 1970 he was the Dean of the Faculty of Law at Monash University. From 1982 to 1984 he was the Law Reform Commissioner of Victoria. In 1984 he was appointed the Chairman of the Law Reform Commission, and from 1986 to 1992 he served as a part-time Commissioner. He has also served as the chairman of a number of medical and legal organisations, including the Infertility Treatment Authority, International Humanitarian Law Committee of the Australian Red Cross Society, Ethics Committee of the Walter and Eliza Hall Institute of Medical Research, and the Appeals Committee of the Royal Australasian College of Surgeons. Professor Waller previously served as Visiting Professor and Research Fellow in several universities in the United States, United Kingdom, Canada and Israel.

== Personal life ==
Waller was born in Siedlce, Poland, on 10 February 1935. He was the only child of Jankiel (Jack) and Haya (Hilda) Waligora. Realising their Jewish family was in danger of persecution from the increasingly threatening National Socialist regime in Germany, Waller's parents managed to flee to Australia in 1938. Upon landing in Melbourne, the family changed its name to Waller. The majority of his family remained in Europe, however, and they were murdered during the Holocaust.

In Australia, Waller attended University High School in Melbourne. He then studied law at the University of Melbourne, obtaining a Bachelor of Laws with Honours. When he graduated in 1956, he went to England where he obtained a Bachelor of Civil Law from the University of Oxford (Magdalen College) with First Class Honours.

He married Wendy Poyser in 1959 and they together had (four) three children: (Michael (dec.)), Anthony, Ian and Elly. Anthony and Elly live in Israel. Ian practised as a barrister in Melbourne and was appointed as a judge of the Supreme Court of Victoria in 2023.

Waller died on 8 October 2019, at the commencement of the Yom Kippur festival.

== Professional career ==
Waller's career in academia began in the late 1950s, when he was appointed tutor and then senior lecturer at Melbourne University. In 1958, Monash University was founded and, a few years later, it opened a new law school. Its Foundation Dean, Professor David Derham, was a friend of Waller's who knew of his teaching and intellectual abilities. He invited Waller to help him create the new Monash Law School. On 1 June 1965, he was appointed Professor. Three years later, he was appointed Dean of Law, a position he held until 1970, after which he returned to focus on teaching and research. An apparently brilliant teacher, his students included future Justice of the High Court of Australia Kenneth Hayne, Chief Justice of Victoria Marilyn Warren, Federal Court and Supreme Court Justice Mark Weinberg and human rights lawyer Julian Burnside QC. Hayne later described Waller as an "electric" law lecturer, while Burnside has described him as "the best teacher I have ever seen".

At Monash, he developed his expertise in the criminal law, and authored the first Australian casebook in that field. Through his teaching and research, he is credited with elevating the status of criminal law in Australia, a field which had often been looked down upon. He continues to author the leading casebook on Australian criminal law, now in its 10th edition.

Waller developed particular interest in medical law and medical ethics. He wrote prolifically on in-vitro fertilisation, a practice which was coincidentally pioneered in the Medicine Faculty at Monash. At the Law Reform Commission, Waller chaired a groundbreaking committee which looked at the possible legal framework surrounding IVF for the first time. When the Victorian Government created the first IVF legislation, it largely adopted Waller's model.

As his career progressed, he became recognised as one of Australia's leading scholars. In 1982, he became the first Law Reform Commissioner of Victoria and, two years later, became the inaugural Chair of the Victorian Law Reform Commission. His expertise in the field of medical law has led to appointments on a number of medical and judicial committees. He is Chairman of the Infertility Treatment Authority, the Appeals Committee of the Royal Australasian College of Surgeons, and the Ethics Committee of the Walter and Eliza Hall Institute of Medical Research.

Waller formally retired from Monash Law School in 2000 as its most senior academic. However, he continued his teaching and research as Emeritus Professor of Law. Upon his retirement, the school established the Louis Waller Chair of Law in his honour.

Waller was made an Officer of the Order of Australia (AO) in the 1989 Australia Day Honours for "service to the legal profession, particularly as a teacher, and to the community". In 2005 he received an honorary LLD (Doctor of Laws) degree from Monash University.
