= Hoong Phun Lee =

Prof. Hoon Phun Lee has held the Sir John Latham Chair of Law at Monash University since 1995 and is currently the Deputy Dean of the Faculty of Law. He is also the Vice-Chairman of the Australian Press Council. Prof. Lee is the author of ‘Constitutional Conflicts in Contemporary Malaysia’, (Oxford University Press, 1995) and the co-author of ‘The Australian Judiciary’ (Cambridge University Press, 2001) and ‘Australian Federal Constitutional Law: Commentary and Materials’ (2nd ed, Lawbook Co, 2007). He is the co-editor of, inter alia, two volumes of essays on ‘The Constitution of Malaysia’ (Oxford University Press, 1978 and 1986), ‘Australian Constitutional Landmarks’ (Cambridge University Press, 2003), and ‘Australian Administrative Law: Fundamentals, Principles and Doctrines’ (Cambridge University Press, 2007). Prof. Lee was also formerly Editor of the Monash University Law Review.
