= Mark Aronson =

Australian judge of the Court of Appeal of the Supreme Court of Victoria

Mark Aronson (born May 1946) is an Australian legal scholar who serves as Emeritus Professor at the UNSW Faculty of Law. He is a leading scholar of administrative law and public law in Australia.

Aronson graduated with a Bachelor of Jurisprudence from Monash University in 1967. In 1968, he completed a Bachelor of Laws with honours from the Monash University Faculty of Law, ranking first in his class and winning the Supreme Court Prize. He was awarded a Commonwealth Scholarship and studied at the University of Oxford, completing a DPhil specialising in administrative law under Sir William Wade. He also taught as a tutor at Merton College, Oxford. On his return to Australia, he joined the newly established UNSW Faculty of Law, where he was offered tenure in 1973. He remained at the Faculty of Law until his retirement in 2006 and continues to research and supervise student dissertations. He has held visiting fellowships at the University of Oxford and the London School of Economics and Political Science.

Aronson has co-authored numerous books in the areas of administrative law, government liability, civil procedure and evidence and public torts and contracts. These include Judicial Review of Administrative Action and Government Liability (2017), Litigation: Evidence & Procedure (1998) and Public Torts and Contracts (1982). He has also published articles in these areas.
