= Brenda Niall =

Australian biographer, literary critic and journalist (born 1930)

Brenda Mary Niall AO FAHA (born 25 November 1930) is an Australian biographer, literary critic and journalist. She is noted for her work on Australia's well-known Boyd family of artists and writers. Educated at Genazzano FCJ College, in Kew, Victoria, and the University of Melbourne, Niall began writing during her time as reader in the Department of English at Monash University.

In June 2004 she was appointed an Officer of the Order of Australia for "services to Australian literature, as an academic, biographer and literary critic" while in 2001 she was awarded the Centenary Medal for "service to Australian Society and the humanities in the study of Australian literature". In 1990 she was elected fellow of the Australian Academy of the Humanities.

Niall is the aunt of sports journalist Jake Niall and judge Richard Niall.

== Bibliography ==
- Martin Boyd – about Martin Boyd (Melbourne, Victoria: Oxford University Press, 1974); revised ed. 1977.
- Seven Little Billabongs: The World of Ethel Turner and Mary Grant Bruce (Carlton, Victoria: Melbourne University Press, 1979); republished in 1982.
- With Frances O'Neill, Australia Through the Looking-glass: Children's Fiction 1830–1980 (Carlton, Victoria: Melbourne University Press, 1984); republished in 1987.
- Martin Boyd, a Life (Carlton, Victoria: Melbourne University Press, 1988); republished in 1989 and 1990.
- Georgiana: A Biography of Georgiana McCrae, Painter, Diarist, Pioneer (Carlton South, Victoria: Melbourne University Press at the Miegunyah Press, 1994); republished in 1996.
- Ian Britain and Pamela Williams (eds.), The Oxford Book of Australian Schooldays (Melbourne: Oxford University Press, 1997); republished in 1998.
- Brenda Niall and John Thompson (eds.), The Oxford Book of Australian Letters (Melbourne: Oxford University Press, 1998); republished in 1999.
- Jane Austen by Claire Tomalin (Melbourne: Department of Discussion Services, Council of Adult Education, 1999).
- The Boyds: A Family Biography (Victoria, Australia: Miegunyah Press, Melbourne University Press, 2002); republished in 2003.
- Martin Boyd: A Life (new ed.) (Carlton, Victoria: Melbourne University Press, 2004).
- Brenda Niall on Arthur Boyd (Carlton, Victoria: Melbourne University Publishing, 2005).
- Judy Cassab: A Portrait (Crows Nest, N.S.W.: Allen & Unwin, 2005).
- Life Class (Carlton, Victoria: Melbourne University Press, 2007).
- The Riddle of Father Hackett: A Life in Ireland and Australia (Canberra, ACT: NLA Publishing, 2009).
- True North: The Story of Mary and Elizabeth Durack (Melbourne, Victoria, Text Publishing, 2012).
- Mannix – about Daniel Mannix (Melbourne, Victoria, Text Publishing, 2015).
- Newman College: A History (Parkville, Victoria, Newman College, 2018)
- Can You Hear the Sea? My Grandmother's Story (Melbourne, Victoria: Text Publishing, 2018).
- Friends and Rivals: Four Great Australian Writers: Barbara Baynton, Ethel Turner, Nettie Palmer, Henry Handel Richardson (Melbourne, Victoria: Text Publishing, 2020).
- My Accidental Career (Melbourne, Victoria: Text Publishing, 2022).
- Joan Lindsay: The Hidden Life of the Woman who Wrote Picnic at Hanging Rock (Melbourne, Victoria: Text Publishing, 2025) ISBN 9781923058019.

== Awards and nominations ==
- 2001: Centenary Medal for service to Australian society and the humanities in the study of Australian literature
- 2002: Queensland Premier's Literary Awards, Non-Fiction Book Award for The Boyds: A Family Biography
- 2004: Officer of the Order of Australia (AO) for service to Australian literature as an academic, biographer and literary critic
- 2016: Australian Literature Society Gold Medal for Mannix
- 2020: Shortlisted, Queensland Literary Awards, Nonfiction Book Award for Friends and Rivals
- 2020: Shortlisted, Nib Literary Award for Friends and Rivals
