= Jeffrey Goldsworthy =

Australian academic and legal philosopher

Jeffrey Denys Goldsworthy AM FASSA is an Australian academic and legal philosopher. He is known for his work in philosophy of law, as well as constitutional theory and interpretation.

He held a Personal Chair at Monash University Faculty of Law from 2000 to 2016. He was the President of the Australian Society of Legal Philosophy from 2007 to 2014. He is known for work on parliamentary sovereignty, especially for his book The Sovereignty of Parliament: History and Philosophy. In constitutional theory, he is a proponent of originalism.

He is the younger brother of author Peter Goldsworthy.

Goldsworthy was elected Fellow of the Academy of the Social Sciences in Australia (FASSA) in 2008. In the 2020 Australia Day Honours Goldsworthy was appointed a Member of the Order of Australia (AM) for "significant service to education, particularly to legal history and philosophy".
