= Reginald Barrett =

Australian judge

The Honourable Reginald Ian Barrett AO

Judge of the Supreme Court of New South Wales
- In office 19 March 2001 – 20 April 2015
- Nominated by: Bob Debus
- Appointed by: Dame Marie Bashir

Judge of the New South Wales Court of Appeal
- In office 2012 – 20 April 2015
- Nominated by: Greg Smith
- Appointed by: Dame Marie Bashir

Personal details
- Born: Reginald Ian Barrett; 1 April 1944 (age 82) Sydney, Australia
- Education: Newcastle Boys High School
- Alma mater: University of Sydney (Wesley College)
- Occupation: Lawyer; jurist

Reginald Barrett AO (born 1 April 1944) was a Judge (2001–2015), Judge of Appeal (2012–2015) and Acting Judge of Appeal (2016-2020) of the Supreme Court of New South Wales. He had been a corporate and securities lawyer and a partner in Mallesons Stephen Jaques, general counsel for Westpac and 20 year partner with Allen Allen & Hemsley.

== Early life and education ==
Reginald Ian Barrett was born on 1 April 1944 in Sydney, New South Wales, the son of Ronald Arthur Barrett and Lila Jean née Frew who had married in 1941. His sister, Kathryn Anne, was born in 1946.

He completed his secondary education (Leaving Certificate) at Newcastle Boys High School and matriculated to the University of Sydney. He graduated with a Bachelor of Arts in 1964 and a Bachelor of Laws in 1967.

He returned to Sydney Law School for further studies and was graduated as a Master of laws with first class honours in 1971.

He served as a councillor of Wesley College at the University of Sydney between 1970 and 1977 where he had been elected senior student in his penultimate undergraduate year.

== Career ==
Barrett was admitted as a solicitor in New South Wales on 17 March 1967.

He was an articled clerk (1964 – 1967) with Allen Allen & Hemsley, a year behind William Gummow (later puisne justice of the High Court of Australia) and a year ahead of John Lehane (later a Federal Court judge). On admission he became an employed solicitor and made partner in 1971. From 1987 to 1989 he was their resident partner in London.

Barrett was appointed as a part-time member of the Companies and Securities Law Review Committee between 1983 and 1987.

In 1991 Barrett left Allens to become Group Secretary and General Counsel for Westpac which had been one of his clients at Allens.

From 1991 he was a part-time member of the Commonwealth Companies and Securities Advisory Committee and convenor of its legal committee.

In May 1995 Barrett became a partner at Mallesons Stephen Jaques where he practised until his commission as a judge of the Supreme Court of New South Wales in 2001. In 1997 he was appointed Deputy Chairman of the Australian Securities Exchange Appeal Tribunal and then Chairman in January 1998. As a corporate and securities law specialist he was involved in several important and complex Australian corporate cases: the 1995 Westpac Challenge Bank merger, the NRMA insurance demutualisation, Comalco's takeover of Rio Tinto and the Australian Stock Exchange demutualisation and self-listing which was a world first.

Barrett has been noted for his commitment to legal education. From 1973 to 1974 and from 1976 to 1987 (when he left Australia to work in London), he was a part-time lecturer at the Sydney Law School of The University of Sydney. He was also a consultant to the Legal Workshop, Australian National University from 1973 to 1977. He chaired the Legal Qualifications Committee of the New South Wales Legal Practitioners Admission Board (2004 – 06) which he had joined in 2002.

Barrett has been a member of the editorial board of the Company & Securities Law Journal since it began publication in 1982. He was the general editor of Robson's Annotated Corporations Legislation from 2010 to 2019, and is a member of the advisory board of Practical Law Australia and an assistant editor of the New South Wales Law Reports.

Barrett was sworn in as a Justice of the Supreme Court of New South Wales on 19 March 2001. In 2012 he was commissioned as a Judge on the New South Wales Court of Appeal. Barrett retired from both positions with effect from 20 April 2015.

On 10 June 2019 he was appointed an Officer in the General Division of the Order of Australia for distinguished service to the law, and to the judiciary, particularly in the area of corporations law and legislation.

== Personal life ==
On 1 August 1970 he married Susan, the daughter of Mervyn G. and Dorothy M. Campbell. They have two sons.

He has sung with the Sydney Philharmonia Choir including at the Opening Ceremony of the Sydney Olympic Games.
