= Company and Securities Law Journal =

- Discipline: Law
- Language: English

Publication details
- History: 1982-
- Publisher: Law Book Co, Sydney (Australia)
- Frequency: bimonthly (since 1989)

Standard abbreviations
- ISO 4: Co. Secur. Law J.

Indexing
- ISSN: 0729-2775

Links
- Journal homepage

The Company and Securities Law Journal is a peer-reviewed law journal published in Australia since 1982.

The general editor is Edmund Finnane. The editorial board includes Reginald Ian Barrett, Simon McKeon and Ian Ramsay.

The journal offers coverage of:

- Company Law
- Takeovers and Public Securities
- Corporate Insolvency
- Corporate Finance
- Securities Industry and Managed Investments
- Current Developments, Legal and Administrative
- Accounting
- Directors' Duties and Corporate Governance
- Overseas Notes: New Zealand, United Kingdom and Europe, United States of America, Canada, Hong Kong, Singapore and Malaysia.

== Journal rankings ==
The Australian Business Deans Council has given this journal a quality rating of "A". The Australian Research Council has ranked this journal in the "C" tier, although the methodology and utility of such rankings has been challenged by Australian legal scholars and the responsible minister has indicated that this ranking system will be discontinued.
