= Richard Niall =

Australian judge

The Honourable Richard Michael Niall

Chief Justice of Victoria
- Incumbent
- Assumed office 3 February 2025
- Preceded by: Anne Ferguson

Judge of the Court of Appeal, Supreme Court of Victoria
- In office 28 November 2017 – 2 February 2025

Personal details
- Born: Melbourne, Victoria
- Education: Monash University
- Occupation: Judge, lawyer

Richard Michael Niall is an Australian jurist who has served as the Chief Justice of the Supreme Court of Victoria since 3 February 2025. He previously served as a judge of the Court of Appeal of the Supreme Court of Victoria from 28 November 2017 to 2 February 2025.

On 17 December 2024, it was announced that Niall would be the next Chief Justice of Victoria.

Niall attended Xavier College and then graduated with a Bachelor of Economics and a Bachelor of Laws (Hons) from the Monash University Faculty of Law in 1989. In 1995, he commenced practice as a barrister at the Victorian Bar, where he specialised in public law, revenue law, discrimination, employment and industrial law, and human rights law. He was appointed senior counsel in 2010. In 2015, he was appointed Solicitor-General of Victoria. He was a member of the legal team that advised the Victorian Labor government on the cancellation of the controversial East West Link project.

Niall is the nephew of academic, biographer, and literary critic Brenda Niall AO FAHA and the cousin of sports journalist Jake Niall.
