= Wotton v Queensland (No 5) =

2016 Australian class action lawsuit

- Court: Federal Court of Australia
- Full case name: Lex Wotton, Agnes Wotton & Cecilia Wotton v State of Queensland & Commissioner of the Police Service
- Decided: 5 December 2016
- Citation: [2016] FCA 1457
- Legislation cited: Racial Discrimination Act 1975 (Cth)

Case history
- Prior actions: No 1 [2015] FCA 910; No 2 [2015] FCA 1073; No 3 [2015] FCA 1074; No 4 [2015] FCA 1075

Court membership
- Judge sitting: Mortimer J

Area of law
- Unlawful racial discrimination; representative proceedings (class actions)

Wotton v Queensland (the Palm Island Class Action case) is a class action lawsuit brought against the State of Queensland and the Commissioner of the Queensland Police Service on behalf of 447 Aboriginal Australians and Torres Strait Islanders who live on Palm Island in Queensland, Australia.

The class action arose out of the events surrounding the death in police custody of Mulrunji Doomadgee on 19 November 2004, the subsequent protests by the community, which led to the police station being burned down on 26 November 2004, and the police response to those protests. The first applicant in the class action, Lex Wotton, was alleged to have been the "ring leader" in what police called the "Palm Island riot", and was subsequently convicted of "riot causing damage".

The case was heard between September 2015 and May 2016, with an appeal brought and then withdrawn in early 2017. In May 2018, the plaintiffs were granted a A$30-million-dollar settlement and an apology by the Queensland Government.

== The class action ==
In 2013, Lex Wotton, as well as his wife Cecilia and Mother Agnes, filed a class action lawsuit on behalf of Indigenous Australian people who lived on Palm Island against the State of Queensland and the Commissioner of the Police Service, alleging that the police had committed acts of unlawful racial discrimination, in breach of section 9(1) of the Racial Discrimination Act 1975 (Cth) in the investigation into Mulrunji's death in custody and in the subsequent police response to the unrest in the community.

The Wottons' legal team included Lex Wotton's long-standing lawyer, Stewart Levitt of law firm Levitt Robinson Solicitors, as well as prominent anti-discrimination barrister Chris Ronalds SC, Aboriginal barrister Joshua Creamer, and barrister Shaneen Pointing.

== Initial trial ==
The initial trial of the claims of Lex, Agnes and Cecilia Wotton, and the issues common to their claims and the claims of the class members was heard in Townsville over a total of 22 days, between September 2015 and May 2016. On 5 December 2016, Justice Mortimer handed down a 1,806 paragraph judgment, making nine declarations that the police had engaged in acts of unlawful racial discrimination, for which the State was vicariously liable.

Justice Mortimer also ordered that the State of Queensland pay $95,000 in compensation to Lex Wotton, $10,000 to Agnes Wotton, and $115,000 to Cecilia Wotton. According to the Wottons' legal team, the judgment left the door open for potentially hundreds of claims for compensation by Aboriginal residents of Palm Island who were affected by the police conduct.

== Appeal ==
In January 2017, Queensland Attorney-General Yvette D'Ath instructed the Crown Solicitor to file an appeal from Justice Mortimer's judgment. The decision was quickly denounced by the State Member for Townsville, Scott Stewart, and the Federal Member for Herbert, Cathy O'Toole, whose electorates include Palm Island and both of whom were members of D'Ath's Australian Labor Party.

On 28 February 2017, D'Ath announced to the parliament that the appeal was being withdrawn after the State had received "a further considered legal advice about the state's prospects of success on appeal".

== Class action settlement ==
In May 2018, the 447 members of the community involved in the class action were granted a A$30 million dollar settlement and an apology by the Queensland Government.

By May 2020, not all of the money had been distributed, owing to errors in the list of recipients.

== Alleged vilification ==
On 18 May 2020, Nine Network, in a "9News investigation", revealed the recipients of the compensation spent some of their money on cars and boats. Its online report, titled "Palm Island riot compensation spent on luxury boats, sports cars and motorbikes" reported that some of the compensation money paid to the class action recipients had "been spent on luxury items including sports cars, luxury boats and dune buggies". While it reported on one man who had invested money for his family, it also cited a teenager who had bought three cars, and the sale of a boat for A$70,000. On 19 May 2020, the Daily Mail printed an article substantially based on the Nine report.

In August 2020 a group of Palm Islanders lodged a complaint with the Australian Human Rights Commission, under Section 18C of the Racial Discrimination Act. Stewart Levitt of Levitt Robinson Solicitors said that the report was inaccurate and racist, implying that Palm Islanders did not deserve the compensation and were spending it irresponsibly. The community subsequently sued Nine in the Federal Court of Australia for A$30 million.

== See also ==
- Trial of Lex Wotton
- Great Palm Island
- 2004 Palm Island death in custody
