= Sentencing Advisory Council =

Legal advisory body in Victoria

The Sentencing Advisory Council of Victoria is an independent statutory body that was established by the Victorian Government in 2004 to conduct research on sentencing in Victoria, Australia. The Council comprises a board of between 11 and 14 directors, who are supported by a secretariat of staff. In Australia, there are also sentencing councils in New South Wales, Queensland and Tasmania. There are also sentencing councils in some overseas jurisdictions, such as in England and Wales and in Scotland.

== History ==
In 2000, the Victorian Government requested a review of aspects of Victoria's sentencing laws, which was undertaken by Professor Arie Frieberg. The 2002 report arising out of that review, Pathways to Justice, recommended a number of changes to Victoria's sentencing system, including the establishment of a Victorian Sentencing Advisory Council. That legislation was passed in 2003, and the Council formally came into operation in 2004. Professor Frieberg was the inaugural Chair of the council from 2004 to his retirement in 2022 and was also the Chair of the Tasmanian Sentencing Advisory Council until 2021.

== Directors ==
The legislation establishing the Council outlines a number of specific qualifications to be nominated by the Attorney-General of Victoria and then appointed by the Governor of Victoria. Some of the qualifications include the need for a person who is a highly experienced prosecution, a person who is a highly experienced defence lawyer, and others with relevant criminal justice experience.

== References from the Attorney-General ==
Over the years, Victoria's Attorney-General has given the Council terms of reference seeking its advice on a range of topics, such as the sentencing of family violence offenders, reforms to restitution and compensation orders and the introduction of a sentencing guidelines council. The council's responses to terms of reference have resulted in changes to maximum penalties for offences and breaches of intervention orders; the abolition of suspended sentences, the introduction of a sentence indication scheme and the addition of hatred and prejudice as a factor in sentencing.

== Community education ==
The council hosts an online interactive sentencing simulation known as ‘Virtual You be the Judge’, presenting face-to-face community education sessions for adults, developing and publishing teaching materials and lesson plans, and developing and publishing plain-language guides to sentencing law and practice.
