= Human Rights Law Centre =

Australian human rights group

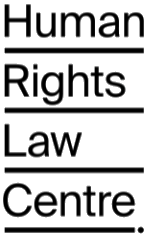
- Type: Nonprofit
- Registration no.: ABN 31 117 719 267
- Legal status: Company limited by guarantee
- Purpose: Human rights
- Locations: Melbourne, Victoria; Sydney, New South Wales, Australia
- Region served: Commonwealth of Australia
- Services: Legal advocacy
- Executive Director: Caitlin Reiger
- Website: hrlc.org.au

The Human Rights Law Centre (HRLC) is an Australian human rights group that assists with legal advocacy, with locations in Melbourne and Sydney. The HRLC was formally incorporated and launched in 2006, with Phil Lynch as the founding Executive Director.

As of August 2026, the Executive Director of the HRLC was Catilin Reiger.

== Activities ==
=== Aboriginal and Torres Strait Islander people ===
In April 2019, the HRLC compiled data showing that Indigenous Australian women were arrested for public drunkenness at 10 times the rate of the general population. This was part of an effort to convince a coroner to rule systemic racism played a role in the death of Tanya Day, an Aboriginal woman who died in police custody.

In May 2019 the Australian Institute of Health and Welfare released figures showing that Indigenous minors were 17 times more likely to be in prison than non-Indigenous youth. Indigenous youth made up 48% of those aged 10–17 in prison, but were only 5% of the general population aged 10–17. The HRLC joined Change the Record, an Aboriginal-led coalition of legal and human rights organisations calling for law reform. Ruth Barson was quoted as saying that it was "common sense" that children should be in school and playgrounds, not prisons.

=== Abortion ===
In May 2019, the HRLC joined 59 other organisations lobbying the New South Wales Government to remove abortion as a criminal offence in the state.

In April 2019 the HRLC (along with the Melbourne Fertility Control Clinic and Castan Centre for Human Rights Law) was granted permission to intervene in High Court of Australia cases (Clubb v Preston and Preston v Avery) where two anti-abortion activists were challenging "safe zone" laws in Victoria and Tasmania which prevented harassment and protesting too close to medical facilities which provide abortions. The HRLC intervened on the side of the Victorian and Tasmanian state governments, and the High Court eventually ruled in their favour.

=== Asylum seekers ===
In May 2019, following the February 18 passage of "medevac" amendments to the Migration Act 1958, the HRLC joined a coalition to organisations including Amnesty International and the Refugee Council of Australia to help sick refugees detained in offshore detention centres on Manus Island and Nauru gain access to medical transport to mainland Australia.

In October 2017, the HRLC criticised Canstruct International for taking a $591 million Australian Government contract to run the Nauru Regional Processing Centre. HRLC said Canstruct was taking up a "poisoned chalice" and that it would be "complicit" in an "internationally abusive system", that there was no ethical way for it to be involved. Keren Adams from the HRLC said “It is particularly appalling that the contract has been awarded to an engineering company with zero experience dealing with vulnerable people [...] Canstruct is an engineering company with a background building bridges. In accepting this contract, it will be taking the job of running a cruel, open-air prison detaining people, including many children, who are deeply traumatised.”

=== Citizenship rights ===
In January 2019, the HRLC criticised the Coalition Government of Scott Morrison for their plans to pass laws expanding powers of the Home Affairs Department (at the time headed by Peter Dutton) to strip Australians of their citizenship. The HRLC argued that expanding this power would risk making people stateless for minor crimes. Emily Howie warned "If Parliament passes this bill, we could see people banished to countries they’ve never even visited for crimes that were not even serious enough for a court to impose a prison sentence,"

=== Gender and sexual minorities ===
In August 2017 the HRLC launched a High Court challenge (Ors; Australian Marriage Equality Ltd & Anor v Minister for Finance & Anor [2017] HCA 40 (M105/M106 of 2017)) against the Australian Federal Government in regards to the Australian Marriage Law Postal Survey. The action was launched behalf of Australian Marriage Equality, and Senator Janet Rice. Anna Brown, then-Director of Legal Advocacy at the HRLC, said that the postal survey was designed to frustrate and delay marriage equality. Though the HRLC's legal argument focused on whether the Minister actually had the power the spend tens of millions of dollars on the nationwide survey. The High Court eventually ruled against the HRLC and other plaintiffs, and the survey went ahead. Afterwards, HRLC noted reports showing that the debate surrounding the survey had a negative effect on LGBTI Australians.

In September 2014, the HRLC spoke in support of the Victorian Government allowing men who were convicted of having gay sex to apply to have their convictions erased. Anna Brown said this would help the men move past the shame of having a criminal record for something that shouldn't have been a crime in the first place.

=== Voting rights ===
In August 2007, the HRLC ran a High Court challenge, Roach v Electoral Commissioner. The High Court eventually ruled that a federal law preventing most prisoners from voting was unconstitutional.. The case was covered in detail in an ABC documentary series entitled 'Judgment: Cases that Changed Australia'.

=== Youth prisoners ===
In April 2019 the HRLC joined the independent Inspector for Custodial Services in condemning the practice in Western Australian prisons of routinely strip-searching prisons, especially minors, without any prior suspicion of wrongdoing. Ruth Barson described the practice as "invasive, traumatic and entirely unnecessary" adding that it "strips people of dignity".

The HRLC has also made statements about Indigenous youth prisoners.
