= Jake Niall =

Australian journalist

- Occupation: Sports Journalist

Jake Niall is a sports journalist at Fox Sports Australia and ABC Radio Grandstand based in Melbourne, Australia. He specialises in covering the Australian Football League, and currently appears on AFL Tonight on Fox Sports News and Fox Footy amongst other appearances on the network. He has also appeared as a guest host on AFL 360 when regular host Mark Robinson is absent.

He moved to Fox Sports in 2016, having previously worked for The Age newspaper since 1995, covering AFL as well as tennis and American sports amongst others. He has also appeared on radio stations Triple M and SEN. On 28 November 2017, it was announced that Niall would return to The Age as chief football (AFL) writer, replacing Caroline Wilson.

Niall is the nephew of academic, biographer and literary critic Brenda Niall AO FAHA and the cousin of judge Richard Niall.

== Awards ==
- 2007 - Melbourne Press Club Quill Award
- 2012 - Alf Brown Award
- 2013 - Walkley Award (shared with Richard Baker, Nick McKenzie, Caroline Wilson, John Silvester and The Age team)
