= Enid Campbell =

Australian legal academic

Enid Mona Campbell, AC, OBE, FASSA (30 October 1932 – 20 January 2010) was an Australian legal scholar, and was the first female professor and dean of a law school in Australasia. She is known for her work on constitutional law and administrative law, as well as her contribution to legal education.

== Early life and education ==
Born in Launceston, Tasmania on 30 October 1932, to Neil and Mona Campbell, she was educated there at Methodist Ladies' College, where she was Dux. She went on to obtain a Bachelor of Laws and a Bachelor of Economics from the University of Tasmania, where she resided at Jane Franklin Hall. She graduated with first class honours, winning the University Medal as top of her class, and was subsequently admitted as a Barrister and Solicitor of the Supreme Court of Tasmania.

Upon graduating in 1955, she won a scholarship to undertake a PhD at Duke University in the United States. Her doctoral studies at Duke examined the work of 19th Century legal philosopher John Austin, a thesis which enabled her to discuss the law from the perspectives of political philosophy, international law and comparative politics.

== Professional career ==
She returned to Australia in 1959 to teach law at the University of Tasmania and the University of Sydney. It was during this period that she began her lifetime of distinguished research in the law. Her first book, Parliamentary Privilege in Australia (1966), is considered the classic text of its field, and is still printed and widely published today. It established her as by far the leading Australian scholar in the field. Her first major textbook, Legal Research: Methods and Materials, now in its fourth edition, is sometimes referred to as the "student bible" on legal research in Australia.

Campbell's work in the 1960s focussed on freedom and rights in Australia, an area that had previously received little academic attention. She co-authored the influential book Freedom in Australia with Professor Harry Whitmore, which was the first full assessment of the topic by legal scholars. In 1967, Campbell was appointed Sir Isaac Isaacs Professor of Law at Monash University. This made her the first woman to hold a Chair in Law at any university in Australasia.

In 1971, she was appointed Dean of Monash Law School – the first female Dean of any law school in Australasia. As a leading scholar in a field traditionally dominated by men, she was said to be an inspiration for young women studying the law, and some of her first students included Mary Gaudron (first female Justice of the High Court of Australia) and Marilyn Warren (first female Chief Justice of the Supreme Court of Victoria).

For 30 years, Campbell was at the forefront of legal research, constitutional law and administrative law. She published numerous books and over 100 journal articles and papers.

She served on several important bodies investigating law reform in Australia, including the Commonwealth Tertiary Education Commission of 1987, the Royal Commission on Government Administration in Australia in 1974, and the Constitutional Commission for the Australian Bicentennial. She received a range of major awards in recognition of her contribution to the law. In 1979, she was awarded the Order of the British Empire and in 2005 was made a Companion of the Order of Australia, the highest honour that can be given to an Australian citizen. In 1971, she was elected a Fellow of the Academy of Social Sciences in Australia. She was also awarded Doctor of Laws degrees (Honoris Causa) from the University of Tasmania, the University of Sydney and Monash University, respectively. She was inducted onto the Tasmanian Honour Roll of Women in 2006.

In 2005, the Federation Press published Law and Government in Australia: Essays in Honour of Enid Campbell to recognise her outstanding contribution to Australian legal research. She officially retired from Monash University in 1997, after 30 years of service. She remained an Emeritus Professor at the University, however, and continued to release publications. She died in Melbourne on 20 January 2010. She has been described by former Prime Minister of Australia Gough Whitlam as having lived 'an exceptional intellectual life' and being 'a public law scholar of the highest distinction'.

== Publications ==
For more than 30 years, Campbell published widely in various areas of law. Some of her major publications are:

- The Australian Judiciary / Enid Campbell & H.P. Lee (2001)
- Australian law schools: a discipline assessment for the Commonwealth Tertiary Education Commission / Dennis Pearce, Enid Campbell, Don Harding (1987)
- Contempt of royal commissions / Enid Campbell (c1984)
- Freedom in Australia / Enid Campbell & Harry Whitmore (1966)
- Legal research : materials and methods / Enid Campbell, Lee Poh-York, Joycey Tooher (1996)
- Liability of public authorities / Enid Campbell (1985)
- Parliamentary privilege / Enid Campbell (2003)
- The prerogative power of dissolution : some recent Tasmanian precedents / Enid Campbell (1962)
- Presentation of legal theses / Enid Campbell (1978)
- Rules of court: a study of rule-making powers and procedures / Enid Campbell (1985)
- Well and truly tried: essays on evidence, in honour of Sir Richard Eggleston / edited by Enid Campbell and Louis Waller assisted by Gretchen Kewley (1982)
