= Bob Baxt =

Australian lawyer

Bob Baxt AO
- Born: 27 June 1938; Shanghai, China
- Died: 11 March 2018 (aged 79); Melbourne, Victoria, Australia
- Education: Wyvern House; Newington College; University of Sydney
- Occupation: Lawyer
- Spouse: Ruth Baxt

Robert Baxt AO (27 June 1938 – 11 March 2018) was an Australian lawyer and a chairman of the Trade Practices Commission, dean of law at Monash University and a professorial fellow of the University of Melbourne.

== Early life ==
Baxt was born in Shanghai, China, raised in Australia, where his family had moved in 1947. He was educated at Newington College (1947–1955), commencing as a preparatory school student at Wyvern House, and the University of Sydney, and did his LLM – Master of Laws – at Harvard Law School 1963–1964.

== Legal career ==
Baxt was a partner of the Australian commercial law firm Freehills. He initially joined Freehills as a solicitor in 1965 before entering academia. From 1980 to 1988, he was dean of the Monash University Faculty of Law. From 1991 to 2004, he was a partner at Allens Arthur Robinson. He rejoined Freehills in January 2005 and became an emeritus partner.

Baxt was involved in a number of Australian legal publications. He was the founder and then general editor of the Company and Securities Law Journal as well as the Australian Business Law Review. He was also editor of the monthly newsletter on corporate regulation, The Baxt Report. In his time as an academic, he was also an editor of the Monash University Law Review.

== Honours ==
- Officer, Order of Australia 2003
- Recipient, Centenary Medal 2001
