= Castan Centre for Human Rights Law =

Research centre at Monash University in Australia

The Castan Centre for Human Rights Law is a research centre located within the Monash University Law Faculty in Victoria, Australia. It was established in 2000 to cater for the study of human rights law globally, regionally and in Australia, and grew rapidly to become the largest research centre in the Monash Law School. As of 2022 it is led by Professor Melissa Castan.

== History ==
The Castan Centre was established in 2000 to meet the need for, and interest in, the study of human rights law globally, regionally and in Australia. The Centre was launched by former Justice of the High Court of Australia, the Hon Michael Kirby AC CMG, who said that the Centre would "reach out to the world" and add a "real cutting edge" to human rights research and advocacy.

The Centre is named after Ron Castan AM, QC (1939-1999), a distinguished barrister who was a prominent advocate of human rights best known for his leading role in the Mabo case which recognised the land rights of First Nations people in Australia.

The Castan Centre has been led by human rights experts including David Kinley, Sarah Joseph, Kevin Bell AM QC, and most recently Melissa Castan.

== Description ==
The Castan Centre brings together leading national and international human rights scholars, practitioners and advocates from a wide range of disciplines in order to promote and protect human rights. It supports the development of legislation and government policy that respects, protects, and fulfils human rights, and develops research on human rights issues and the law, including book chapters, academic journal articles, reports and submissions to inquiries by government and United Nations bodies. It also engages in public education through seminars, online publications, and Australia's only dedicated annual human rights conference.

The Castan Centre strongly advocates for Australia to be a leader in the promotion and protection of human rights domestically, in the Asia-Pacific region, and across the globe. This includes the Castan Centre's commitment to advocating for a federal Charter of Human Rights.

As of 2022 Melissa Castan leads the centre.

== Areas of work ==
The Castan Centre's research, policy, and advocacy work is wide ranging and covers both domestic and international human rights issues. The Castan Centre has adopted the following principal thematic Program Research Groups:

- Climate Change and Human Rights
- Economic, Social and Cultural Rights
- Indigenous Peoples' Human Rights
- Charters of Rights
- Gender and Sexuality
- Technology, Privacy and Information.

== Activities ==
The centre's main activities are research, teaching, public education (lectures, seminars, conferences, parliamentary submissions, internships and media presentations), applied research, advice work, policy work and consultancies.

=== Student programs ===
The Castan Centre provides opportunities for students who are passionated about human rights to kick-start and develop their human rights careers. To do so, the Castan Centre endeavours to give as many students as possible the experience of working in human rights policy through its various student programs, including:

- In-house Internship Program: students spend one full day per week during semester on various human rights related projects. This enables students to assist the Centre in its human rights projects while learning more about human rights.
- Castan Centre Human Rights Clinic: the Human Rights Clinic engages students in practical human rights work, providing the opportunity for students to work with external clients on policy projects that have a real-world impact.
- Summer and Winter Vacation Research Program: high-achieving students work directly with a Castan Centre Academic Member on a research project, providing the student with research experience and an insight into research and academic careers.
- Human Rights Masters Degree and human rights subjects: the Monash University Faculty of Law offers the oldest Master's degree in Australia dedicated to the study of human rights law. The Faculty of Law also offers a number of undergraduate and postgraduate units on a number of human rights topics, including the popular subject Introduction to International Human Rights Law.

=== Public education ===
The Castan Centre shares its expertise and raises awareness about key human rights issues and developments in the law, including through regular lectures by human rights experts.

The Castan Centre annual conference is the only dedicated human rights conference in Australia and has become a vital source of the latest information on Australian and international human rights issues. The conference is widely attended both in person and online and is a key fixture on the Australian legal calendar.

The Castan Centre frequently utilises social media to run innovative public education campaigns on human rights to reach new audience. The 'Have You Got That Right?' video series was particularly successful in generating widespread interest and understanding of human rights concepts, particularly with younger viewers. The Centre also manages publishes up-to-date and accessible short-form blog posts on the Castan Centre Human Rights Blog, which receives contributions from prominent Australian human rights experts.

=== Policy development ===
The Castan Centre utilises its world-class human rights expertise to influence public debate and government policy by providing impartial and independent views on human rights issues to government, the media, and through its own social media channels.

The Castan Centre has a long history of contributing to law reform through its submissions to parliamentary committees. Globally, the Castan Centre utilises this expertise by providing submissions to international bodies, including United Nations bodies. This includes advice relating to local human rights issues, as well as advice on global events.

Another way the Castan Centre influences policy development in Australia is its engagement with the media. Through its media engagements, the Castan Centre reaches wider audience by providing expert advice on public issues relating to human rights. The Centre's experts are regularly the first point of contact for journalists on topical human rights issues.

== Past activities ==
=== Academic programs ===
The Castan Centre's previous academic programs have included

- Global Internship Program
- Human Rights Moot Competition
- Human Rights Essay Competition
- Native Title Internships.

== Staff and governance ==
=== Governance ===
The current Director of the Castan Centre is human rights scholar and educator, Associate Professor Melissa Castan, who has worked with the Centre since its inception. Associate Professor Castan recently succeeded Professor the Hon Kevin Bell AM QC who previously served as a Justice of the Supreme Court of Victoria for 15 years and departed the Castan Centre to take up a position as Commissioner of the Yoorrook Justice Commission. The current governance structure of the Castan Centre is as follows:

- Director: Professor Melissa Castan
- Deputy Director (Education): Associate Professor Ronli Sifris.

=== Membership ===
Members of the Castan Centre are

- Governance office holders
- Academic Members, who consist of academics from the Faculty of Law at Monash University and from other Faculties or Institutions
- Affiliate Members, who consist of higher degree by research students within the Monash University Faculty of Law
- Castan Centre Staff.
