= Fear of a Brown Planet =

Australian stand-up comedy duo

- Born: Aamer Rahman; 17 October 1982 (age 44); Saudi Arabia; Nazeem Hussain; 21 April 1986 (age 40); Noble Park, Melbourne, Victoria, Australia
- Notable work: Fear of a Brown Planet Returns (2011)

Comedy career
- Years active: 2007–present
- Medium: Stand-up, television, film
- Genres: Observational comedy, satire
- Subjects: Racism, political humour, war on terror, immigration, race relations

Fear of a Brown Planet was an Australian stand-up comedy duo consisting of Aamer Rahman and Nazeem Hussain.

== History ==
=== Origins ===
Aamer Rahman and Nazeem Hussain met through their work with young Muslims, their support for asylum seekers and anti-racism activism.

In 2007, Hussain entered Triple J's Raw Comedy Award open mic competition at the Melbourne Comedy Festival After seeing Hussain compete, Rahman also decided to enter. The two beat hundred of other hopefuls from around Australia to reach the Victorian State final together. Rahman won the State Final and went onto the national finals where he was voted the runner-up in a performance that was screened nationally on ABC Television.

Due to the success of Raw Comedy, the two decided to develop their five-minute stand-up routines into a one-hour show together with Egyptian-Australian comedian Mohammed El-Leissey. Fear of a Brown Planet debuted at the Melbourne Fringe Festival in 2007. Concentrating on issues of racism, immigration and the War on Terror, the show was considered controversial in what was then an extremely homogenous and apolitical comedy scene in Australia, selling out its entire run. Following the success of Fear of a Brown Planet's debut, El-Leissey left the group to pursue media opportunities.

=== Fear of a Brown Planet (2008 – 2013) ===
The group name played on the Public Enemy LP, Fear of a Black Planet, and the dynamic between the group's rappers Chuck D and Flavor Flav. Hussain opened the shows with half an hour of lighter material focusing on family stereotypes and immigrant stories, followed by Rahman who delivered harder-hitting and more aggressive opinions about racism, colonialism and whiteness. Australian comedy reviewers often found Rahman's style too abrasive.

In April 2008, Rahman and Hussain performed Fear of a Brown Planet at the Melbourne International Comedy Festival, Sydney Comedy Festival, and the Adelaide Fringe, winning the Best Newcomer Award at the Melbourne International Comedy Festival.

In 2010, Rahman and Hussain performed their follow up show, Fear of a Brown Planet Returns at the Melbourne International Comedy Festival, Sydney Comedy Festival, and the Adelaide Fringe. In the same year, Aamer performed in the Melbourne International Comedy Festival Oxfam Comedy Gala televised on Channel Ten, whilst Nazeem performed in the Cracker Night of the Sydney Comedy Festival Gala, televised on The Comedy Channel. In October 2010, the pair took part in a one-off concert with Azhar Usman, Preacher Moss and Mo Amer (Allah Made Me Funny) at the Athenaeum Theatre in Melbourne.

In August 2011, Fear of a Brown Planet debuted at the Edinburgh Fringe Festival. On the way home from Edinburgh they performed an impromptu sold out show in London after a friend organised a show at the historic Hootananny venue Brixton with only two days notice.

In 2011, Australian Story broadcast a documentary on the ABC about Rahman's and Hussain's lives in Australia as well as their debut performances in Edinburgh and London. In the same year, they performed their new show, Fear of a Brown Planet Attacks. On 30 August 2011, Fear of a Brown Planet Returns DVD and Blu-ray was released, which was recorded at the Chapel Off Chapel in Melbourne on 15 January 2011. It features the "best of" material from their 2010 sell-out festival show, also entitled Fear of a Brown Planet Returns, as well as content from their debut shows. In December 2011 and December 2012, they performed on ABC2.

In April 2012, Rahman and Hussain played at the second show of the Melbourne Comedy Festival. In September 2012, they toured the United Kingdom, where they performed in cities including Manchester, Bradford, London, Birmingham and Cardiff.

In 2013, they performed at Darwin, Sydney, Brisbane and Melbourne. In October 2013, they performed at the Sydney Opera House.

== Comedy style and reception ==
Rahman and Hussain write together and perform as a tag-team. Their show splits into two sets, each performing alone before handing over to the other.

Each is introduced by a video-montage poking mild fun at political idiocies. Their style is orthodox standup, distinguished by the quality and novelty of the material. Guardian journalist Brian Logan described Rahman's comedy style as cheerful and upbeat, while describing Hussain's style as sly, laconic and wry sardonic. Hussain is energetic, using an assortment of accents and playful movements whilst Rahman proves black comedy delivered when standing still can be effective.

Majority of Rahman's material are things that have happened to him and about the community. Hussain's jokes are about himself, his family and his community.

=== Reviews ===
- "Self deprecating and thought provoking." – The Big Issue
- "The punchlines are razor sharp." – The British Comedy Guide
- "Easy charm, subversive spirit - and a cool confidence." – The Guardian
- "This is bold comedy with an unbelievably powerful message, and totally unmissable." – Beat Magazine

== Awards ==
In 2008, Rahman and Hussain were recipients of the Melbourne International Comedy Festival Best Newcomer Award for their debut show Fear of a Brown Planet.

== See also ==
- Islam in Australia
- Islamic humour
- Allah Made Me Funny
