= Jennifer Davies (judge) =

Australian judge

The Honourable Justice Jennifer Davies

Judge of the Federal Court of Australia
- Incumbent
- Assumed office 4 July 2013

Judge of the Supreme Court of Victoria
- In office 6 April 2009 – 4 July 2013

Personal details
- Born: 14 February 1957 (age 69) Melbourne, Australia
- Children: Rohan, Lachlan
- Parents: Daryl Davies QC (father); Jeanne Davies (mother)
- Education: Monash University
- Occupation: Judge, lawyer

Jennifer Davies (born 14 February 1957) is an Australian judge who sat in the Supreme Court of Victoria from 2009 until she was appointed to the Federal Court of Australia in 2013.

== Early life and education ==
Davies is the daughter of former Federal Court judge Daryl Davies QC and Jeanne Davies. Her brother Greg and sister Ceclia are also lawyers. Davies initially studied arts at Monash University before transferring to the Faculty of Law, graduating in 1978 with a Bachelor of Law and Bachelor of Jurisprudence.

== Career ==
Davies did her articles at Pavey, Whiting & Byrne and continued to work there after her admission as a solicitor in 1980. In 1982 Davies worked for Deacons in trademark law before becoming a barrister in 1983, practising in both criminal and civil law. Davies worked part-time following the birth of her sons, before returning to work as a solicitor at Mowbray, working in tax law. Davies returned to the bar in 1990 practising in tax law, corporations, commercial and administrative law. Davies was appointed a Senior Counsel in 2004.

In addition to her legal practice, Davies has been a lecturer on tax law at the Melbourne Law School.

=== Supreme Court of Victoria ===
Davies was appointed to the Supreme Court of Victoria in 2009, working in the Commercial Court and was the judge in charge of the Victorian Taxation Appeals list.

=== Federal Court ===
Davies was appointed to the Federal Court on 4 July 2013. Davies dismissed an application by the Australian Centre for Corporate Responsibility seeking to establish a right of shareholders to request the Commonwealth Bank to disclose its funding of carbon emissions. In 2017 Davies was appointed a part-time Deputy President of the Australian Competition Tribunal.

== See also ==
- List of Judges of the Federal Court of Australia
