= Tony Pagone =

Former Judge of the Federal Court of Australia

The Honourable Tony Pagone AM KC

Judge of the Federal Court of Australia
- In office 21 June 2013 – 31 March 2018

Personal details
- Occupation: Federal Court Justice

Gaetano (Tony) Pagone AM KC is a retired Australian judge who previously served as a judge of the Federal Court of Australia from 21 June 2013 until 31 March 2018. Until 21 June 2013, he was a judge of the Supreme Court of Victoria in the Australian state of Victoria.

He completed secondary education at De La Salle College, Malvern and completed tertiary education at Monash University, graduating B.A., Dip.Ed., LL.B. In 1983, he obtained an LL.M. from Trinity Hall, Cambridge. In 2001, he was awarded a Monash Distinguished Alumni Award. Pagone was appointed as Queen's Counsel in 1996.

He was first appointed to the Supreme Court in 2001, and served until June 2002, when he took up the position of special counsel to the Commissioner of Taxation until December 2003. He was appointed to the Supreme Court again in May 2007, and was the judge in charge of the Commercial Court. He is a professorial fellow at the University of Melbourne.

The Honorable Tony Pagone QC was appointed as Commissioner to the Royal Commission into Aged Care Quality and Safety on 13 September 2019.

In 2022, Pagone was appointed as a Member of the Order of Australia (AM) in the 2022 Australia Day Honours for "significant service to the law, to the judiciary, and to professional associations".

== See also ==
- List of Judges of the Federal Court of Australia
- List of Judges of the Supreme Court of Victoria
