= Pamela Hanrahan =

Australian legal academic

Emerita Professor Pamela Fay Hanrahan
- Born: 24 May 1965 (age 61); Melbourne, Victoria
- Education: University of Melbourne, Melbourne Law School, Case Western Reserve University School of Law
- Occupations: academic lawyer and company director
- Title: Emerita Professor
- Website: Staff Profile; SSRN

Pamela Hanrahan (born 24 May 1965) is an Australian lawyer, author, and media commentator on corporate law and financial services regulation in Australia.

== Education ==
Pamela Fay Hanrahan was born 24 May 1965 in Melbourne, Australia, and educated at Loreto Mandeville Hall and Presbyterian Ladies’ College Melbourne where she was a MacFarland Scholar (Dux of School) in 1982. She attended the University of Melbourne and CWRU Law School.

== Career ==
Hanrahan began her legal career with Allens (then Arthur Robinson & Hedderwicks) in 1989. In 2004, she was appointed as an associate professor of the Melbourne Law School. From 2008 to 2011, she served as a senior executive of the Australian Securities and Investments Commission, including as ASIC Regional Commissioner for Queensland from 2010 to 2011. From 2013 to 2015 she was the Registrar of Community Housing for New South Wales. From 2015 to 2023, she was Professor of Commercial Law and Regulation in the UNSW Business School and in 2024 she was appointed an Emerita Professor of the University of New South Wales. In 2017 she was a member of the ASIC Enforcement Review Taskforce. In 2018 she was an adviser to the Royal Commission into Misconduct in the Banking, Superannuation and Financial Services Industry.

She was elected as a member of the executive of the Business Law Section of the Law Council of Australia in 2017 and became Chair of the Business Law Section in 2023.

In May 2023, Hanrahan returned to private practice as a Consultant at Johnson Winter Slattery.

== Publications ==
Hanrahan's books on Australian corporate law and financial services regulation include:

- Securities and Financial Services Law (jointly) (LexisNexis Australia, 10th ed, 2021)
- Corporate Governance (jointly) (LexisNexis Australia, 2017)
- Managed Investments Law and Practice (CCH Australia, 1999-2023)
- Funds Management in Australia: Officers’ Duties and Liabilities (LexisNexis Australia, 2009)
- Commercial Applications of Company Law (jointly) (Oxford University Press, 23rd ed, 2022)
- Commercial Applications of Company Law in Malaysia (jointly) (3rd ed, 2008)
- Commercial Applications of Company Law in New Zealand (jointly) (5th ed, 2015)
- Commercial Applications of Company Law in Singapore (jointly) (5th ed, 2015)
- Contemporary Issues in Corporate and Competition Law: Essays in Honour of Professor Robert Baxt AO (joint editor) (LexisNexis Australia, 2018)
