= Rosemary Langford =

Australian lawyer

Rosemary Langford (née Teele) is a lawyer, writer and academic from Australia. She is Harold Ford Professor of Commercial Law at Melbourne Law School at the University of Melbourne.

Langford grew up in Melbourne and attended Presbyterian Ladies' College, Melbourne. She has a first class honours degree in Law (as well as a Bachelor of Arts majoring in French and German) from the University of Melbourne and a PhD from Monash University. On graduating she worked as a lawyer with Allens Arthur Robinson (now Allens Linklaters) and later became a lecturer in law at the University of Melbourne Law School. She is also a barrister and solicitor at the Supreme Court of Victoria.

Langford is an active member of the Corporations Committee of the Business Law Section of the Law Council of Australia, as well as the Not for Profit Law Committee of the Law Council of Australia. She also edits the Directors' Duties Section of the Company & Securities Law Journal.

== Publications ==
- Directors’ Duties: Principles and Application (2014), Federation Press
- Company Directors’ Duties and Conflicts of Interest (Oxford University Press, 2019)
- Technology and Corporate Law (Edward Elgar, 2021)
- Corporate Law and Governance in the 21st Century (edited, Federation Press, 2023)
