= Anne Ferguson (judge) =

Australian judge

The Honourable Chief Justice Anne Ferguson

12th Chief Justice of Victoria
- In office 2 October 2017 – 2 February 2025
- Nominated by: Martin Pakula
- Appointed by: Linda Dessau
- Preceded by: Marilyn Warren
- Succeeded by: Richard Niall

Judge of the Victorian Court of Appeal
- In office 12 August 2014 – 2 February 2025

Judge of the Supreme Court of Victoria
- In office 3 May 2010 – 2 February 2025

Personal details
- Spouse: Kim Hargrave
- Education: Monash University; University of Southampton

Anne Ferguson is an Australian judge and former lawyer who served as Chief Justice of Victoria from 2 October 2017 to 2 February 2025. She was first appointed as a judge of the Supreme Court of Victoria in 2010.

== Early life ==
Ferguson was educated at the Brigidine Sisters’ Killester College in Springvale where she was academic dux. She studied Arts and Law at Monash University, winning the Supreme Court Prize as the top student in her graduating class. Ferguson was also appointed Editor of the Monash University Law Review.

In 1989, she graduated with a Doctor of Philosophy in Law from the University of Southampton. Her thesis was on unfair contracts.

== Legal career ==
Prior to her judicial appointments she worked as a litigator at J.M. Smith & Emmerton and Allens Arthur Robinson. She also previously served as Honorary Secretary to the Council of Legal Education, one of only 5 people to ever hold the position in the organization's 100-year history.

== Judicial office ==
Ferguson was first appointed a judge of the Trial Division of the Supreme Court of Victoria in 2010. In 2014, she was made a Judge of the Court of Appeal.

In August 2017, Ferguson was named as the next chief justice of Victoria, succeeding Marilyn Warren. Ferguson took office in October 2017. In her role as chief justice, Ferguson is chair of the Judicial Commission of Victoria.

In 2019, Ferguson heard the high profile County Court appeal of Cardinal George Pell against his conviction for the commission of sexual offences. Ferguson concurred with the Court of Appeal 2–1 majority rejecting the appeal, which was subsequently overruled by the High Court.

On 5 September 2024, it was announced that Ferguson would retire as Chief Justice of Victoria and as a judge of the Supreme Court of Victoria with effect from 2 February 2025.

== Personal life ==
Ferguson is married to fellow Supreme Court judge, Justice Kim Hargrave.

Legal offices
Preceded by Marilyn Warren	Chief Justice of Victoria; 2017–2025	Succeeded by Richard Niall
