= Clyde Croft =

Australian judge

Clyde Elliott Croft AM is a retired Australian jurist who sat as a Trials Division Judge in the Supreme Court of Victoria and as a judge of the Commercial Court until 2019.

Croft is a former Examiner in Commercial Tenancy Law in the Solicitors’ Specialist Accreditation Scheme, and senior advisor to the Small Business Commissioner of Victoria.
