= Tony D'Aloisio =

Australian politician

Anthony Michael "Tony" D'Aloisio AM (born 1949 in Italy) was Chairman of the Australian Securities and Investments Commission (ASIC). He held the position from 13 May 2007 to 2011, having previously served as an ASIC commissioner.

== Early life and education ==
Tony D'Aloisio graduated from Monash University with a Bachelor of Arts and a Bachelor of Laws and was admitted to practice as a barrister and solicitor in Victoria, Western Australia, Queensland and the ACT, and as a solicitor in NSW.

== Career ==
Tony D'Aloisio joined Mallesons in 1977. His main experience prior to that was principal legal officer with the Commonwealth Attorney-General's Department in the business and consumer affairs division in Canberra. D'Aloisio practised as a commercial lawyer at Mallesons Stephen Jaques until taking up his role as chief executive in 1992. His principal areas of practice were mergers and acquisitions, taxation and restrictive trade practices, and international trade and investment. He was chief executive Partner at Mallesons between 1992 and 2004.

Before joining ASIC, D'Aloisio held the position of managing director and chief executive officer at the Australian Securities Exchange (ASX) from 2004 to 2006. During this time, he was also director of the World Federation of Stock Exchanges. In addition to practising law, D'Aloisio held a number of management and business positions within Mallesons, with his role involving extensive assessment of legal markets in Hong Kong and China, Thailand, Taiwan, Indonesia, Singapore, Malaysia, US and the UK.

D'Aloisio was Managing Partner of the Year in 2001 and in 2002 (Australian Law Awards).

He is also a director of the Business Council of Australia and a member of the Board of Taxation, the International Legal Services Advisory Council and the Chairman of its Globalisation of Legal Services Committee. D'Aloisio was appointed as a non-executive director of IRESS Limited in June 2012.

== Oakridge Estate Winery ==
In December 2007, while Chairman of ASIC, Tony D'Aloisio and his wife purchased the Oakridge Estate Winery from the administrators of collapsed company, Evans & Tate. ASIC granted an expedited special exemption from financial reporting in response to a request from the administrators, Ferrier Hodgson. ASIC Special Counsel, Stephen Yen, stated that D'Aloisio had not been involved in granting the reporting waiver to Ferrier Hodgson.

The organisation D'Aloisio formerly headed, the Australian Securities Exchange, was not informed of the purchase. Creditors and shareholders of the failed company were not informed of D'Aloisio's involvement in the purchase of their assets and details of the purchase were never made public. ASIC Special Counsel, Stephen Yen, stated that D'Aloisio had disclosed the acquisition to the Minister. D'Aloisio was reported as rejecting any notion of a conflict of interest in purchasing an asset from a listed company in financial distress while Chairman of ASIC.

== Honours ==
On 1 January 2001, Tony D'Aloisio was awarded the Centenary Medal for "service to Australian society through law and taxation". On 11 June 2012, he was named a Member of the Order of Australia for "service to business and commerce, particularly through leadership roles in the securities and investments regulatory sector, to Australia-Asia relations, and to charitable organisations."
