= Aamer Rahman =

Australian stand-up comedian (born 1982)

- Born: Saudi Arabia
- Spouse: Que Ali (m. 2012)

Comedy career
- Years active: 2007–present
- Medium: Stand-up; television; film
- Genres: Observational comedy; satire; deadpan; sarcasm
- Subjects: Racism; racism in Australia; political humour; War on terror; terrorism; race relations; immigration; religion; protest; current events
- Website: aamerrahman.com

Aamer Rahman (Bengali: আমের রহমান) is an Australian writer and stand-up comedian of Bangladeshi descent, best known for his viral bits "Reverse Racism" and "Is it OK to Punch Nazis?"

== Early life and education ==
Rahman's parents are from Bangladesh and moved to the Middle East. Rahman was born in Saudi Arabia, and moved back and forth between Australia and the Middle East before returning to Australia when he was 13.

Rahman attended Monash University. He was an editor of the student newspaper, Lot's Wife, in 2002. Although he graduated with a degree in law, he did not pursue a legal career.

== Stand-up career ==
=== 2007–2013 (RAW comedy, Fear of a Brown Planet) ===
In 2007, Rahman's friend Nazeem Hussain entered Triple J's Raw Comedy Award open mic competition at the Melbourne Comedy Festival After seeing Hussain compete, Rahman also decided to enter. Rahman won the state final and went onto the national finals where he was voted runner-up in a performance that was screened on ABC Television.

Due to the success of Raw Comedy they decided to develop their five-minute stand-up routines into a one-hour show,Fear of a Brown Planet - a play on the Public Enemy LP, Fear of a Black Planet. Rahman and Hussain first performed Fear of a Brown Planet at the Melbourne Fringe Festival. Prior this, Rahman had only been on stage three times for RAW. In 2008, Rahman and Hussain were recipients of the Melbourne International Comedy Festival Best Newcomer Award for Fear of a Brown Planet.

Rahman performed extensively with Fear of a Brown Planet alongside Nazeem Hussain throughout the early 2010s.In October 2010, they took part in a one-off concert with Allah Made Me Funny at the Athenaeum Theatre in Melbourne.

Their shows, including Fear of a Brown Planet Returns (2010) and Fear of a Brown Planet Attacks (2011), were staged at major comedy festivals such as the Melbourne International Comedy Festival, Sydney Comedy Festival, Adelaide Fringe, and the Edinburgh Festival Fringe. The duo also toured internationally, including performances across the United Kingdom, and released a recorded special of Fear of a Brown Planet Returns in 2011.

=== 2013–2016 solo career, quitting standup ===
In April 2013, after announcing the end of Fear of a Brown Planet Rahman performed his debut solo show, The Truth Hurts, at the Melbourne Comedy Festival to critical praise. In 2014, he performed "The Truth Hurts" at the Soho Theatre in London and was named as one of the Guardian Newspaper's Top 10 live acts of the year. Rahman had also been a regular contributor to Political Asylum, Melbourne's topical stand-up comedy night.

=== 'Can We Kick It?' (Web series) 2018 ===
In 2018 Rahman produced a web series in New York featuring rappers, artists and comedians including Immortal Technique, Brother Ali, Hasan Minhaj, Aparna Nancherla, Akilah Hughes and Franchesca Ramsey.

== Return to standup ==
After being absent from standup for almost 7 years, Rahman returned to standup in 2024 to independently release 'The Culture War Mixtape' addressing the genocide in Gaza.Rahman has stated that he was shocked by the lack of artists speaking on the issue, and felt compelled to return to the stage. The clips were released in a raw, mixtape style format rather than a full, polished comedy album. A number of clips went viral, including "The Only Democracy," and "Scratch a Liberal and a Fascist Bleeds."

== Comedy style ==
Rahman and Hussain perform alone before handing over to their comedic partner. Rahman's comedy has been described as wry and subversive.

== Television and radio career ==
Rahman wrote and performed for television including appearing on ABC Radio National and Triple J, Channel Ten's Melbourne Comedy Festival Gala, The Comedy Channel's You Have Been Watching, ABC1's Tractor Monkeys. He was a writer for season one of Balls of Steel Australia.

In 2017, he featured in the ABC and Chemical Media film You See Monsters, about Muslim Australian artists addressing anti-Muslim racism through creativity, satire and irreverence.

== Trivia ==
Rahman was a part-time youth worker and graphic designer. Comedian Guz Khan started his standup career opening for Rahman in 2014.

== Heritier Lumumba racism controversy ==
Following Heriter Lumumba's appearance on The Project, Rahman published a viral thread on X detailing how he believed hosts Waleed Aly and Peter Helliar had colluded with Collingwood to cast doubt on Lumumba's story of racial abuse during his time at the Collingwood Football club. This led to a public apology from Helliar.

== Views ==
In December 2014, in his Tumblr post "White Rapper FAQ", Rahman wrote "...A white rapper like Iggy Azalea acts out signifiers which the white majority associates with black culture – hyper sexuality, senseless materialism, an obsession with drugs, money and alcohol – as well as adopting clothing, speech and music – as a costume that they can put on and discard at will. It's a cheap circus act."

== Personal life ==
Rahman is a Muslim. Since its inception in 2009, Rahman has been involved with RISE: Refugees, Survivors and Ex-Detainees – the only refugee organisation in Australia that is run and governed by refugees and ex-detainees. He was active in visiting refugees in detention and has been vocal a vocal supporter of immigrant and asylum seeker rights. He has developed projects in RISE's Music & Arts portfolio. He was involved in RISE's youth development projects including the RISE Music & Arts Festival (2010 and 2011) and RISE's Cypher Hip Hop Project (2011).

== See also ==
- Bangladeshis in Australia
- Islam in Australia
- Islamic humour
