= Kevin Bell (judge) =

Australian judge (born 1954)

The Honourable Kevin Bell AO KC

Justice of the Supreme Court of Victoria
- In office 10 February 2005 – 12 March 2020

President of the Victorian Civil and Administrative Tribunal
- In office 19 February 2008 – 2020

Personal details
- Born: Kevin Harcourt Bell; 13 November 1954 (age 71) Carlton, Victoria, Australia
- Education: Monash University
- Profession: Barrister, judge

Kevin Harcourt Bell AO, KC (born 13 November 1954) is a former judge of the Supreme Court of Victoria, in the Australian state of Victoria.

== Early life and education ==
Bell was born on 13 November 1954.

He holds a Bachelor of Arts and a Bachelor of Laws with honours from Monash University.

== Career ==
Bell served as a judge of the Supreme Court of Victoria between February 2005 and March 2012.

In May 2021, Bell was appointed as a Commissioner of the Yoorrook Justice Commission. The Yoorrook Justice Commission is a Royal Commission established by the Victorian Government to examine past and ongoing injustices to the First People of Victoria resulting from colonisation to provide a culturally safe place in which First People and others can tell the truth about traumatic events that have happened and their effects, to identify systemic injustice in Victoria and propose reforms to end that injustice and to propose matters that might be included in Victoria’s ongoing treaty-making processes.

Owing to this appointment, Bell stood down as Director of the Castan Centre for Human Rights Law in 2022 and was succeeded by Melissa Castan. Bell was then appointed as an academic member of the Castan Centre and adjunct professor in the Faculty of Law at Monash University.

In October 2023, Bell resigned his position as Commissioner of the Yoorrook Justice Commission. Bell also served as Co-Chair of the National Stigma and Discrimination Reduction Strategy Steering Committee of the Australian National Mental Health Commission between September 2021 and October 2023.

== Other activities ==
Bell served as the President of the Victorian Civil and Administrative Tribunal (VCAT) between February 2008 and 2010.

Bell was also previously elected as a Councillor of the City of Essendon, where he was active in establishing the Essendon Community Legal Centre.

== Honours ==
In 2017 Justice Bell was appointed a Member of the Order of Australia for significant service to the law and to the judiciary, to native title and human rights, and to the community. He was promoted to Officer of the Order of Australia in the 2024 King's Birthday Honours.
