= Fear of a Brown Planet Returns =

- Promotional poster
- Directed by: Danielle Karalus
- Starring: Aamer Rahman; Nazeem Hussain
- Distributed by: Madman Entertainment
- Release date: 31 August 2011
- Running time: 75 minutes
- Country: Australia
- Language: English

Fear of a Brown Planet Returns is a 2011 Australian concert film directed by Danielle Karalus with Australian comedy duo Aamer Rahman and Nazeem Hussain.

== Production and release ==
The film features the "best of" material from Aamer Rahman and Nazeem Hussain's 2010 festival show, Fear of a Brown Planet Returns, and content from their debut shows. It was recorded at the Chapel Off Chapel in Melbourne on 15 January 2011 and released on DVD and Blu-ray on 31 August 2011.
