= Trade Practices Commission =

Former Australian government agency

Agency overview
- Formed: 1974
- Dissolved: 1995
- Superseding agency: Australian Competition & Consumer Commission
- Jurisdiction: Australia
- Headquarters: Canberra
- Key document: Trade Practices Act 1974

The Trade Practices Commission was an agency of the Government of Australia responsible for monitoring and enforcement activities under the Trade Practices Act 1974. It was superseded by the Australian Competition & Consumer Commission in 1995.
