= Sarah Joseph (legal academic) =

Australian human rights scholar

- Born: Sarah Louise Joseph
- Education: University of Sydney
- Occupation: Human rights scholar

Sarah Louise Joseph is an Australian human rights scholar. She was Director of the Castan Centre for Human Rights Law at Monash University from 2005-2019. She is now Professor of Human Rights Law at Griffith Law School.

== Early life and education ==
Joseph holds a Bachelor of Arts and a Bachelor of Laws from the University of Sydney, a Master of Laws from the University of Cambridge, and a Ph.D. in Law from Monash University.

== Career ==
Joseph is a legal academic and commentator, specialising in the areas of human rights and constitutional law. She has published Corporations and Transnational Human Rights Litigation (Hart 2004), and co-authored The International Covenant on Civil and Political Rights: Cases, Commentary and Materials (OUP, 2nd ed, 2004), Federal Constitutional Law: A Contemporary View (Thompson, 2nd ed, 2006), A Handbook on the Individual Complaints Procedures of the UN (OMCT, 2006), The International Covenant on Civil and Political Rights: Cases, Commentary and Materials (OUP, 3rd ed, 2013), and Federal Constitutional Law: A Contemporary View (Thompson, 5th ed, 2019).
