= Arie Freiberg =

Israeli-born Australian legal academic

Professor Arie Freiberg AM
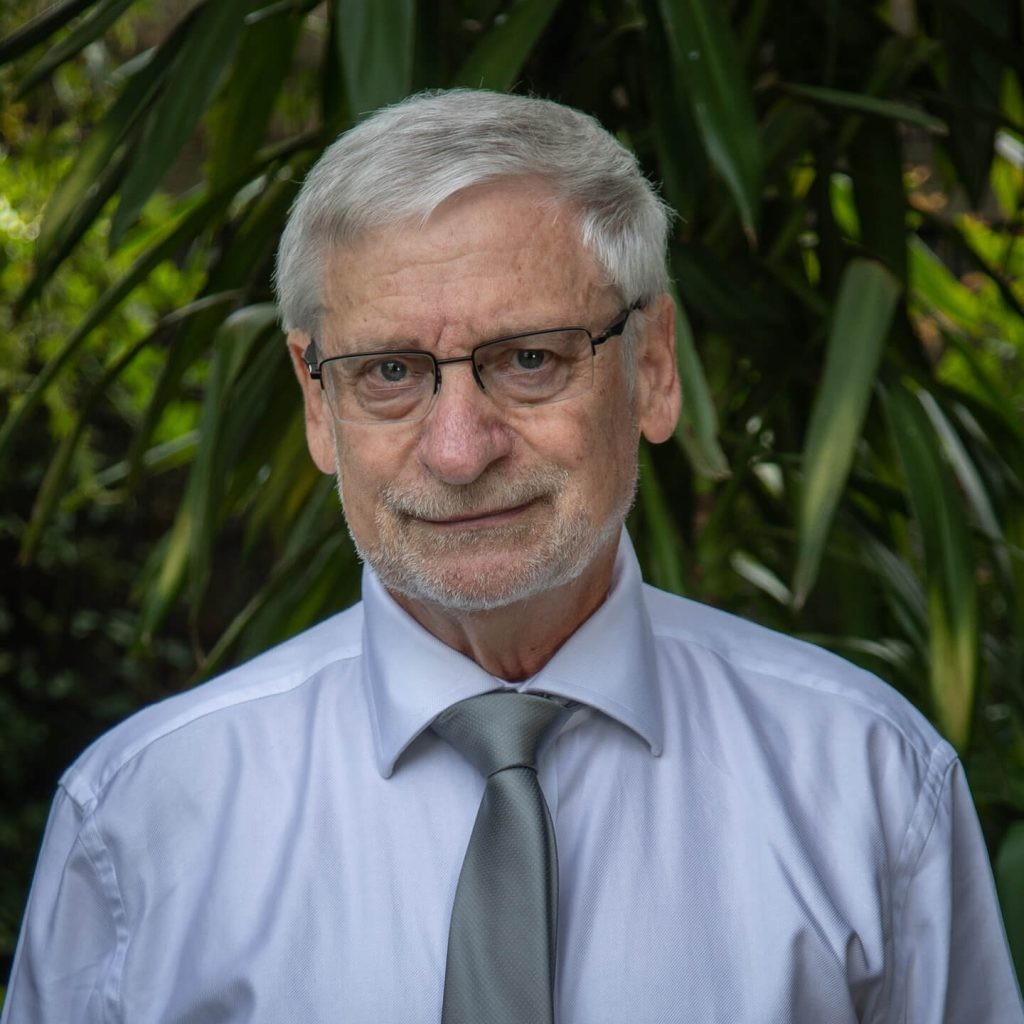
- Born: August 22, 1949 (age 77); Israel
- Occupation: Legal academic
- Known for: Sentencing law, criminology, non-adversarial justice, regulatory theory
- Title: Emeritus Professor
- Awards: Member of the Order of Australia (2009); Fellow of the Academy of the Social Sciences in Australia; Fellow of the Australian Academy of Law

Academic background
- Education: University of Melbourne (LLB (Hons), DipCrim, LLD); Monash University (LLM)

Academic work
- Institutions: Monash University; University of Melbourne

Arie Freiberg AM (born 22 August 1949) is an Israeli-born Australian legal academic and one of the country's foremost experts on sentencing and the criminal justice system. He is an Emeritus Professor at Monash University, where he served as Dean of the Faculty of Law from 2004 to 2012. He was the inaugural Chair of the Victorian Sentencing Advisory Council, serving from its establishment in 2004 until his retirement in October 2022. He also served as Chair of the Tasmanian Sentencing Advisory Council from 2013 to December 2021.

== Early life ==
Freiberg was born in Israel and emigrated to Australia with his family in 1955. He undertook his undergraduate studies at the University of Melbourne, graduating in 1972 with a Bachelor of Laws with Honours and a Diploma in Criminology. He later obtained a Master of Laws from Monash University in 1984 and was awarded a Doctor of Laws by the University of Melbourne in 2001.

== Professional career ==
Freiberg's academic career began in 1976 when he accepted a tutorship at Monash University, following two formative years as a researcher at the newly established Australian Institute of Criminology in Canberra. This marked the beginning of a teaching vocation that would span five decades. Before his professorial appointments, he was Reader in Law at Monash University and also worked briefly for the Commonwealth Director of Public Prosecutions.

In January 1991, Freiberg was appointed to the Foundation Chair of Criminology at the University of Melbourne. He served as Head of the Department of Criminology from January 1992 to June 2002 and was Dean of the Faculty of Arts in 2003. In 2004, he returned to Monash University as Dean of the Faculty of Law, a position he held until 2012. He was subsequently appointed an Emeritus Professor of Monash University in 2013.

Freiberg has been a visiting scholar at prestigious institutions, including Harvard Law School (2014) and Tel Aviv University (2008). He has served as President of the Australian and New Zealand Society of Criminology (1996–1998). He is a Fellow of the Academy of the Social Sciences in Australia and a Fellow of the Australian Academy of Law. He taught the Executive Master of Public Administration subject "Governing by the Rules" at the Australia and New Zealand School of Government from 2008 until 2022.

Throughout his career, Freiberg has served as a consultant to various governments and law reform bodies. He has advised the Federal, Victorian, South Australian, and Western Australian governments on sentencing matters, as well as the Australian and South African Law Reform Commissions. In 2015, he consulted to the Royal Commission into Institutional Responses to Child Sexual Abuse on sentencing issues, and in 2016 he was a consultant to the Queensland Department of Justice and Attorney-General on drug courts.

=== Public service and advisory roles ===
Beyond his academic positions, Freiberg has held numerous public service roles. He served on the Interim Advisory Board of the Victorian Environment Protection Authority (2017–2018), the Agency Management Committee of the Australian Health Practitioner Regulation Agency (from 2020), and the Board of the Judicial College of Victoria (from 2015). He was also a member of Energy Safe Victoria's Future Trends Advisory Committee from 2021 to 2023. He was a member of the Council of the Australian Institute of Judicial Administration between 2006 and 2012.`

=== Sentencing Advisory Council ===
After leading a major review of sentencing laws during 2001–2002, Pathways to Justice, Freiberg was appointed by the Victorian Government as foundation chair of the newly established the Sentencing Advisory Council in 2004. The council is an independent statutory body which advises the Victorian Government on sentencing laws, and liaises with and educates the broader community on sentencing.

As chairman of the council, Freiberg has made a number of major recommendations on sentencing law reform. The most publicised and controversial of these was the abolition of suspended sentences, which Freiberg labelled "inherently flawed". He has also urged for the removal of provocation as a relevant consideration in sentencing for homicides, increased use of home detention, and has advocated increased use of specialised courts such as drug courts. Freiberg has also recommended that judges be allowed to indicate to defendants what their penalty may be if they plead guilty, as a means of encouraging early guilty pleas, reducing court backlogs and preventing victims from experiencing the trauma of a trial. During his chairmanship of the Tasmanian council, the council published major reports on non-conviction sentences, sentencing for sex offences, family violence, driving offences, and suspended sentences,

More broadly, Freiberg's recent work has focussed on the developing area of non-adversarial justice.

== Publications and research focus ==
Freiberg is a prolific author, with nearly 200 publications to his name. His research has focused on sentencing, the administration of criminal justice, non-adversarial justice, regulatory theory and practice, and the role of emotion in criminal justice and public policy. His work has been published in leading journals such as Criminology, Criminal Law Forum, and Punishment and Society as well by publishers such as Oxford University Press, The Federation Press, Palgrave Macmillan and Edward Elgar.

Freiberg's research has made contributions to sentencing law and policy, particularly around sentencing consistency, the purposes of sentencing, and the role of public opinion. In one study, he examined how jurors, judges, and legislators compare in their views on the purposes of sentencing, revealing important differences between these groups in Victoria. He has also investigated the challenge of pursuing consistency within an individualistic sentencing framework, exploring how sentencing decision-making can be made more principled and predictable. His work on suspended sentences has been influential, arguing that they are "uncertain, unstable, unpopular, and unnecessary" and contributing to policy debates that led to their abolition in Victoria. More recently, he has written on sentencing commissions and guidelines, regulation, parole, plea negotiations and victims.

== Publications ==
- Regulation in Australia (2nd ed, The Federation Press, 2025). ISBN 9781760025502 (print).
- Sentencing Guidelines and Commissions: Comparative Perspectives (Oxford University Press, 2025) with Julian V Roberts and Rhys Hester. ISBN 9780197644799 (print).
- Advanced Introduction to Sentencing (Edward Elgar, 2025) I with Julian V Roberts. ISBN 9781035317585 (paperback).
- Parole on Probation: Parole Decision-making, Public Opinion and Public Confidence (Palgrave Macmillan, 2023) (with Robin Fitzgerald, Shannon Dodd, and Lorana Bartels).
- Victims and Plea Negotiations: Overlooked and Unimpressed (Palgrave Macmillan, 2021) (with Asher Flynn).
- Plea Negotiations: Pragmatic Justice in an Imperfect World (Palgrave Macmillan, 2018) (with Asher Flynn).
- Sentencing for Child Sexual Abuse in Institutional Contexts (Royal Commission into Institutional Responses to Child Sexual Abuse, 2016) (with Hugh Donnelly and Karen Gelb).
- Non-Adversarial Justice (The Federation Press, 2nd ed., 2014) (with Michael King, Arie Freiberg, Becky Batagol, and Ross Hyams).
- Sentencing: State and Federal Law in Victoria (Oxford University Press, 3rd ed., 2014) (with Richard Fox).
