= James Judd (judge) =

Australian judge

James Judd is a Trials Division justice at the Supreme Court of Victoria in Australia and the Deputy Principal Judge of the Commercial Court. He was appointed in 2008, and prior to this worked as both a lawyer and as an instructor at St. Hilda's College, Oxford in the United Kingdom.
