= Louis Matheson =

Sir Louis Matheson KBE, CMG, FTSE

1st Vice-Chancellor and President of Monash University
- In office 1960–1976
- Succeeded by: William Scott

Personal details
- Born: James Adam Louis Matheson; 11 February 1912 Huddersfield, West Riding of Yorkshire, England
- Died: 27 March 2002 (aged 90) Melbourne, Victoria, Australia
- Spouse: Lady Audrey Matheson
- Education: Manchester University
- Profession: Civil engineer

Sir James Adam Louis Matheson KBE CMG (11 February 1912 – 27 March 2002) was a British engineer and university administrator, who served as the first Vice-Chancellor of Monash University in Melbourne, Australia.

== Early life ==
Born in Huddersfield, Matheson studied engineering at Manchester University. Matheson graduated with a Bachelor of Science in engineering (1932) and a Master of Science (1933) from the University of Manchester, and a PhD from the University of Birmingham (1946). After spending 6 years as a civil engineer from 1933 to 1938, he took up a position at the University of Birmingham and then the University of Melbourne, where he modernised the Melbourne University engineering curriculum. At Melbourne University, he worked under Robert Blackwood, a relationship that continued when Blackwood went on to become Monash's first Chancellor. In 1951, after only a few years in Australia, he returned to the UK to accept the Beyer Chair in Engineering at the University of Manchester.

== Vice-Chancellor of Monash ==
In 1960, at just 47 years old, Matheson became the first Vice-Chancellor of Monash University, a position he held until 1976. Given only 12 months to prepare for the opening of the University, Matheson worked with exceptional speed and effectiveness. He assembled staff, established courses, and set up faculties, teaching and research facilities. When Monash opened, Matheson led and oversaw rapid development, from an empty site in Clayton, to a university recognised internationally for excellence in research and teaching. When the University opened in 1961, it had just 347 students; but 11 years into Matheson's term, it had expanded to over 12,000. Matheson managed the tumultuous years of student activism at Monash in the late 1960s and early 1970s. He was often criticised by some of the more radical students, but succeeded in maintaining strong academic standards throughout. His responsiveness to student ideas and demands meant the unrest was contained as successfully as possible.

In an article written shortly after his death, the Australian Academy of Technological Sciences and Engineering observed that "it is hard to imagine how Matheson could have built the university better." The arts and social sciences library at the University's Clayton Campus is named in his honour. A book by Matheson published in 1980, Still learning, provides an account of his years at Monash.

During his term as Vice-Chancellor, he sat on the Royal Commission on the collapse of Melbourne's King Street Bridge (from 1962 to 1963).

== Later life ==
Beyond his work at Monash, Matheson also oversaw the development of two universities in Papua New Guinea, and was Chancellor of the University of Papua New Guinea from 1973 to 1975. He was active in a number of research and professional organisations in Australia. He was a Foundation Fellow of the Australian Academy of Technological Sciences and Engineering and President of the Institution of Engineers.

Matheson received numerous distinguished awards for his achievements at Monash. He received Honorary Doctorates from Hong Kong, Manchester, Melbourne and Monash Universities.

He was appointed a Companion of the Order of St Michael and St George (CMG) in 1972, and a Knight Commander of the Order of the British Empire (KBE) in 1976 for services to education and services to Victoria.

In 1989, Matheson suffered a stroke which confined him to a wheelchair for the remainder of his life. His wife, Lady Audrey, cared for him at home during this time. Matheson died on 27 March 2002 at the age of 90. His widow died on 16 November 2014, aged 100.

Academic offices
New title	Vice-Chancellor of Monash University; 1960–1976	Succeeded by William Scott
