= Monash University Law Review =

- Discipline: Law
- Language: English
- Edited by: Anna Huynh, Tina Tu, Isabelle Jenkins, Sebastiano D'Intini, and Amin Sedigh

Publication details
- History: 1974 – present
- Publisher: Monash University Publishing (Australia)
- Frequency: Triannually
- Open access: Yes

Standard abbreviations
- Bluebook: Monash U. L. Rev.
- ISO 4: Monash Univ. Law Rev.

Indexing
- ISSN: 0311-3140

Links
- Journal homepage; Online archive

The Monash University Law Review is an academic journal at the Monash University Faculty of Law.

Contributors to the journal are commonly academics or legal practitioners.

== Governance ==
The journal is overseen by a student editorial board, which works together with an editorial committee, as well as one faculty advisor.

== Notable alumni ==
There have been many notable editors and contributors to the journal, including the current Chief Justice of the Federal Court of Australia Debra Mortimer and the former Chief Justice of Victoria Anne Ferguson.

Past editors of the journal are listed on its website.
