= Chief Justice of Victoria =

Senior judge

The chief justice of Victoria is the senior judge of the Supreme Court of Victoria and the highest ranking judicial officer in the Australian state of Victoria. The chief justice is both the judicial head of the Supreme Court as well as the administrative head. They are responsible for arranging the business of the court and establishing its rules and procedures.

The current chief justice is Richard Niall, who was appointed by Governor Margaret Gardner to succeed Anne Ferguson. Niall's term began on 3 February 2025.

== List of chief justices of Victoria ==
No.	Image	Chief justice	Term began	Term ended	Time in of office	Governor appointed	Notes
1		William à Beckett	19 January 1852	20 February 1857	5 years, 32 days	Charles La Trobe	
2		William Stawell	25 February 1857	24 September 1886	29 years, 211 days	Henry Barkly	
3		George Higinbotham	24 September 1886	31 December 1892	6 years, 98 days	Henry Loch	
4		John Madden	9 January 1893	10 March 1918	25 years, 60 days	John Hope, 7th Earl of Hopetoun	
5		William Irvine	9 April 1918	30 September 1935	17 years, 157 days	Arthur Stanley	
6		Frederick Mann	1 October 1935	31 January 1944	8 years, 122 days	William Vanneck, 5th Baron Huntingfield	
7		Edmund Herring	2 February 1944	1 September 1964	20 years, 213 days	Winston Dugan	
8		Henry Winneke	2 September 1964	31 May 1974	9 years, 271 days	Rohan Delacombe	
9		John McIntosh Young	1 June 1974	16 December 1991	17 years, 198 days	Henry Winneke	
10		John Harber Phillips	17 December 1991	17 October 2003	11 years, 304 days	Davis McCaughey	
11		Marilyn Warren	26 November 2003	1 October 2017	13 years, 309 days	John Landy	
12		Anne Ferguson	2 October 2017	2 February 2025	7 years, 123 days	Linda Dessau	
13		Richard Niall	3 February 2025		1 year, 44 days	Margaret Gardner	

== See also ==
- Judiciary of Australia
- Supreme Court of Victoria
