= Journalism school =

Educational institution specializing on journalism

A journalism school is a school or department, usually part of an established university where journalists are trained. 'J-School' is an increasingly used term for a journalism department at a school or college. Journalists in most parts of the world must first complete university-level training, which incorporates both technical skills such as research skills, interviewing techniques and shorthand and academic studies in media theory, cultural studies and ethics.

== Africa ==
In 2007, the United Nations Educational, Scientific and Cultural Organization (UNESCO) named what it terms the Potential Centres of Excellence in Journalism Training in Africa. After thorough research, there were 12 journalism and media training institutions named on the list and they were not placed in any order.

These 12 UNESCO Potential Centres of Excellence in Journalism Training in Africa are the Department of Journalism at the Tshwane University of Technology in Pretoria in South Africa (TUT), Mass Communication Department at Makerere University in Uganda, School of Journalism and Media Studies at Rhodes University in Grahamstown in South Africa, Department of Mass Communication at the University of Lagos in Nigeria, School of Communication, Legal and Secretarial Studies at the Namibia Polytechnic, Mozambican School of Journalism in Mozambique, Centre d'études des sciences et techniques de l'information in Senegal, The School of Journalism and Mass Communication at the University of Nairobi in Kenya, Department of Journalism at the University of Stellenbosch in South Africa, Institut Supérieur de l'Information et de la Communication in Morocco, School of Communication Studies at Walter Sisulu University in South Africa and Ecole Supérieure de Sciences et Techniques de l'Information et de la Communication in Cameroon.

UNESCO's list is not exhaustive, and new schools have been founded since the study was conducted.

With the rise of the Internet and social media in the past five years there has been increasing demand for journalism schools offering specialized training in the kinds of modern challenges journalists face in the rapidly changing online-media landscape. E-jicom Graduate School of Journalism and Communication in Dakar, Senegal is one such institution.

== Asia ==
The most populous continent is also home to the world's largest democracy and its pace of growth and booming economies have led to a proliferation of media enterprises. The rise of digital publishing has created newer opportunities for employment and self-employment in the field of journalism and mass communication.

=== India ===
Unlike the rest of the world, print media continues to grow and thrive in India with its over 1.4 billion people. With over 900 TV channels and over 100,000 registered publications, digital publishing has only added to the opportunities. Dozens of regional languages and English being the aspirational language, newspapers in India are now published in 100 different languages. The government of India established the "Indian Institute of Mass Communication (IIMC)" in 1965, which has now 6 campuses across India. Dozens of universities and independent institutes provide education for shaping journalism, media and mass communication professionals. Several universities and independent institutes provide education for shaping journalism, media and mass communication professionals. Notable among them is the Jindal School of Journalism and Communication at O.P. Jindal Global University, Sonipat, which offers courses in Film and Media, Corporate Communication.

=== Pakistan ===
Pakistan is a large country of South Asia with a population almost 220 million people. It has all contemporary media i.e. print, electronic and social media widely used by the citizens. Each public and private university has established separate institute for imparting education in mass communication, journalism and media. Recently the Government of Pakistan has promulgated Protection of Journalists and Media Professionals Act 2021 in order to provide more safe and conducive working environment to the local as well as international journalists.

=== Philippines ===
The University of the Philippines (UP) offered a journalism class as part of a curriculum designed by Walter Robb Wilgus beginning in 1919, though it was short-lived. At the University of Santo Tomas (UST), undergraduate journalism education was established during academic year 1928–1929 in the Faculty of Philosophy and Letters. The first graduates completed the program in 1933. Journalism instruction combined academic coursework with exposure to professional practice, with working journalists serving in the faculty and campus papers providing students with experience in reporting, editing and newspaper production. The University of the Philippines established its Institute of Mass Communication in 1965, later elevated to the College of Mass Communication (renamed College of Media and Communication in 2025).

== Europe ==
=== Central Europe ===
The International Media Center (Slovenia-Austria-Serbia), offers in cooperation with South East Europe Media Organisation (SEEMO) and South East and Central Europe PR Organisation (SECEPRO) several courses, including master programme.

In Hungary, The Hungarian Bálint György Academy of Journalism (previously known as Hungarian School of Journalism) runs under the aegis of the National Association of Hungarian Journalists (MÚOSZ). Before 1989, the Hungarian School of Journalism served as a highly selective post-graduate program for well-trained journalists in Hungary. Since 2003, the Bálint György Academy of Journalism belongs to the accredited professional education system.

Budapest Metropolitan University was established as Budapest College of Communication in 2000 and has been providing students with journalism, communication, and media studies classes. The school is also in partnership with the Hungarian Public Television (MTVA).

=== Denmark ===
In Denmark, the University of Southern Denmark established a journalism study programme in 1998 at the then founded Centre for Journalism, as did Roskilde University, following the political decision to break the Danish School of Journalism's monopoly on educating journalists in Denmark. The purpose was and is to increase the diversity of teaching and research within the field of journalism. Since its establishment, the Centre for Journalism has launched several innovative features within the field, including the by now renowned award for journalists, "The Journalistic Fellowship", and the introduction of a journalist's oath similar to the Hippocratic oath. Also, in terms of scientific publications it is the most productive journalism research department in Denmark (status: 2005).

=== Eastern Europe ===
In Russia, the MSU Faculty of Journalism is the leading journalism school and the world's largest school of journalism. The majority of textbooks on journalism in Russian were written by MSU scientists. Other one is Media institute of Higher School of Economics. One of the leaders school of international journalism is faculty of international journalism of Moscow State Institute of International Relations. Vladimir Mezentsev school of journalism is the oldest media School for young journalism.

In Minsk (Belarus), the Institute of Journalism of BSU is one of the leading scientific and educational centers in the sphere of Mass Media in the territory of the former soviet countries. It possesses a highly respected scientific and pedagogical standard and prepares professionals in mass media for work in Belarus and abroad.

=== France ===
In France, 14 schools are recognized by the profession at the national level. The Paris-Panthéon-Assas University's Centre de Formation des Journalistes (CFJ), was founded in 1946 by two Resistance leaders, although the University of Lille's École supérieure de journalisme de Lille had been founded earlier (1924).

Other Parisian journalism schools are Sciences Po Journalism School, the Sorbonne University's CELSA, the Paris-Panthéon-Assas University's French Press Institute (IFP) and the PSL University's Institut Pratique du Journalisme (IPJ).

In the different French regions : École de journalisme de Toulouse (EJT), the Bordeaux Montaigne University Institute of Journalism (IJBA), the Aix-Marseille University School of Journalism and Communication (EJCAM), the University of Strasbourg's Centre for Journalism Education (CUEJ), the department of Journalism and Communication at the University of Rennes in Lannion or Grenoble Alpes University School of Journalism (EJDG).

Founded in 1899, the École Supérieure de Journalisme in Paris, France is a claimant for the title of the first journalism school.

=== Germany ===
During the Third Reich, the Nazis established the Reichspresseschule (Imperial School of Press), in which journalists were taught to write what the National Socialist German Workers' Party wanted the German public to think.

After the war, the first journalism school in Germany was founded in 1949 as Werner Friedmann Institute. 1961 the school's name was changed into Deutsche Journalistenschule (German school of journalism). In 1979, a new journalism school was created in Hamburg, later renamed after the founder of Stern magazine, Henri Nannen.

=== Spain ===
The top journalism school in Spain according to El Mundo newspaper is the University of Navarra. It is the oldest school of journalism in Spain and among the top 10 world universities of medium size according to the QS ranking. Many reputed and well-known journalists have studied at Universidad Complutense de Madrid, one of Madrid's most prestigious university. Princess Letizia of Spain studied journalism at this university, which is the main public university in the country. Other universities include Charles III University of Madrid, Pompeu Fabra University, Autonomous University of Barcelona and Pontifical University of Salamanca.

=== United Kingdom ===
Historically, in the United Kingdom entrants used first to complete a non-media-studies related degree course, giving maximum educational breadth, prior to taking a specialist postgraduate pre-entry course. However, this has changed in recent years with journalism training and education moving to higher educational institutions. There are now over 60 universities in the UK offering BA honours degrees in journalism. Postgraduate courses are more well-established, some of which are either recognised by the National Union of Journalists (NUJ) or the National Council for the Training of Journalists (NCTJ). A Diploma of Journalism was established at London University in 1919, but university journalism education in Britain did not become a significant endeavour until the 1970s, with establishment of the University of Wales postgraduate program. Most training from the mid-20th century was run by the National Council for the Training of Journalists.

The Department of Journalism Studies at the University of Sheffield is rated Number 1 in the UK by the Guardian (2019) for Journalism, Publishing & Public Relations, and number 1 in the UK by the Times/Sunday Times (2018) for Communication and Media Studies. The National Student Survey results for both 2009 and 2010 placed The University of Sheffield No. 1 in the UK for overall satisfaction with Journalism Studies.

Of City University London's Journalism Department The Independent commented that City's postgraduate courses had "rightly accrued legendary status within the media." Former Guardian editor Peter Preston wrote: "What's the passport to journalism? The dreaming spires of... City University". City's faculty includes Professors George Brock and Roy Greenslade. Alumni include Sophie Raworth of the BBC, Sky's Dermot Murnaghan and Channel 4 News Economics Editor Faisal Islam.

Another well-established course is the highly regarded School of Journalism, Media and Cultural Studies at Cardiff University which was founded in 1970 by Tom Hopkinson. The course was also the UK's top-rated course by the National Council for the Training of Journalists for the academic year 2007/8.

The University of Kent's Centre for Journalism was established with Professor Tim Luckhurst as the first head. The Centre runs both undergraduate and postgraduate degrees that are accredited by the National Council for the Training of Journalists. and the Broadcast Journalism Training Council. The Centre offers guaranteed work placements with the KM Group. It was ranked best for undergraduate study of journalism in The Guardian's University Guide for 2015, and in The Times Good University Guide 2016 in which it was ranked first for graduate employment prospects in journalism.

One of Europe's longest established centres of journalism education is the department of Journalism, Media and Communication, University of Central Lancashire (also known as UCLan), which launched its first print journalism course in 1962 at the then Harris College, which later became part of the University of Central Lancashire. Of the school, a 2008 article in The Times observed that "it is acknowledged as one of the leading centres for the teaching of journalism in Britain". In 2010, the University won the Broadcast Journalism Training Council's award for general excellence.

The School of Journalism at the University of Lincoln was formally opened by the journalist John Pilger in 2004. It provides programmes at all degree levels. Research in the School focuses on media ethics, international human rights, the coverage of US/UK warfare, and literary journalism, with 70% of the research output assessed in 2008 as 'internationally excellent' or 'world leading'. Teaching emphasizes the growing focus on the convergence of platforms in the media. Courses are accredited by the BJTC and the Periodicals Training Council (PTC). and the School is 'Recognised for Excellence' by the European Journalism Training Association (EJTA).

The Press Association offer a fast-track 17-week course in multimedia and print journalism (NCTJ). The short length and intensity of the course makes entry extremely competitive. It was previously owned by Trinity Mirror, and many national newspapers send trainees to take part in at least some PA training within a graduate scheme.

Liverpool John Moores and Bournemouth have well-respected journalism courses. Kingston University, Bournemouth and Birmingham City have developed fully converged journalism courses without reference to separate production disciplines such as radio, newspaper or magazine journalism. Issues from a European perspective in evaluating journalism schools were discussed by the president of the European Journalism Training Association in an interview with Marianne Peters of this Association.

The London School of Journalism (LSJ) is an independent institution with postgraduate programs in journalism and writing. It was founded in 1920 by Sir Max Pemberton. Kingston University also has a recently established department of journalism. Founded in 2003 it has courses accredited by the NCTJ and PTC. The campus newspaper and magazine produced by its journalism students have won best student publication in the national Guardian Student Media Awards.

== North America ==
=== Canada ===
In Canada, A listing (unranked) of journalism schools has been assembled by Canadian-Universities.net. Journalism schools are listed and classified on the "J-Schools & Programs" page of the Canadian Journalism Project.

The University of British Columbia Graduate School of Journalism is one of the few graduate-only journalism schools on the continent.

=== United States ===
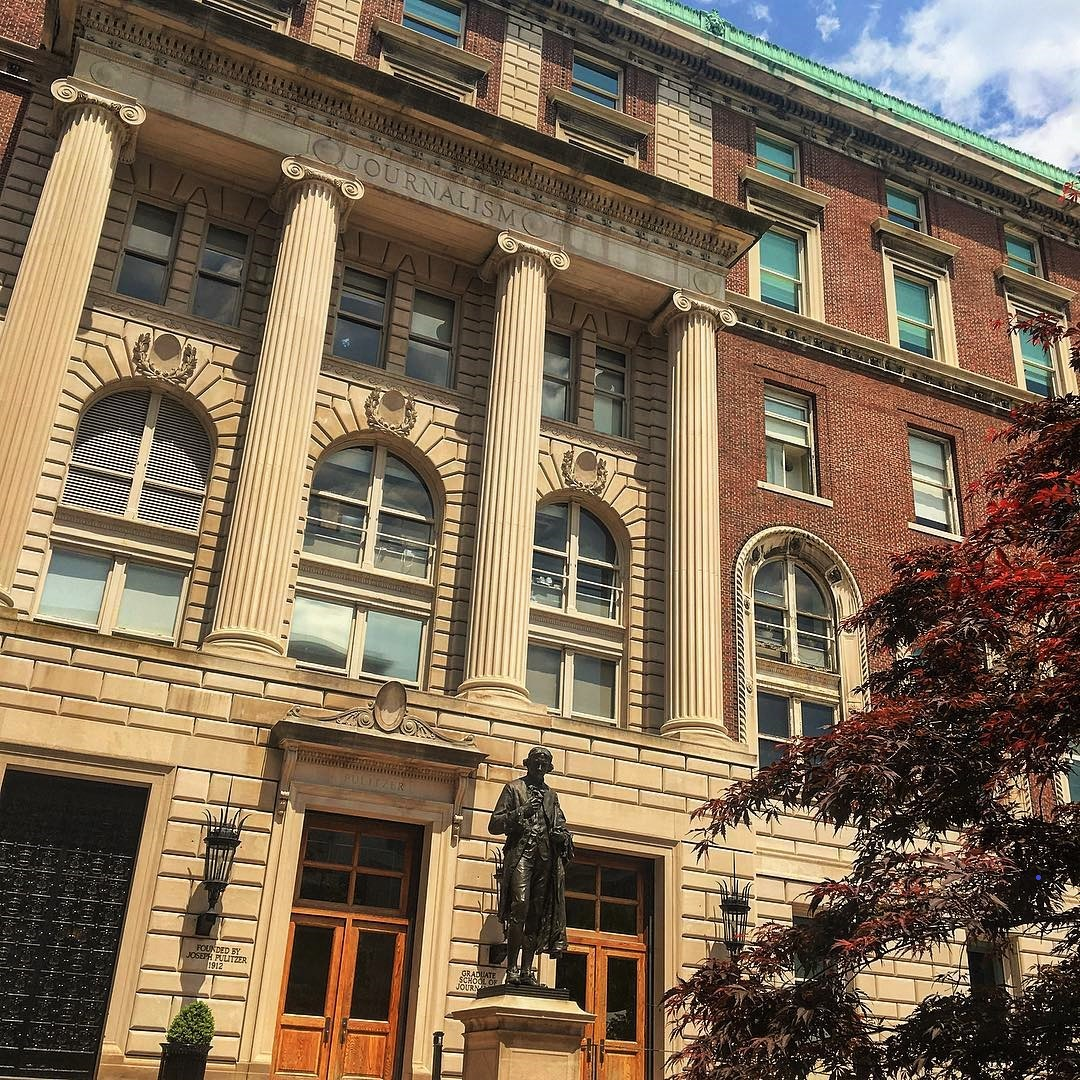
Pulitzer Hall, which houses the Columbia University Graduate School of Journalism

In the United States, the Accrediting Council on Education in Journalism and Mass Communications (ACEJMC) applies eight standards in evaluating university programs: mission, governance and administration; curriculum and instruction; diversity and inclusiveness; full-time and part-time faculty; scholarship: research, creative and professional activity; student services; resources, facilities and equipment; professional and public service; and assessment of learning outcomes. The ACEJMC has awarded accreditation to 109 university and college programs of study in journalism and mass communications, but does not attempt to rank the courses or programs. It accredits colleges, schools, departments or divisions.

The listing of a unit as accredited indicates that the unit has been judged by ACEJMC to meet its standards. That judgment is rendered after a self-study prepared by the faculty and administration of the unit and an independent evaluation of the unit by educators and practitioners. The listing shows the bachelor's and professional master's degree programs that were examined during the unit's most recent accreditation review. Some units offer degrees in addition to those listed here. ACEJMC does not accredit programs leading to the PhD, which is considered a research (and not a professional) degree. The Council does not list sequences or specialties.

University of Missouri is a claimant in the title for the first journalism school.

There are only three graduate-only journalism schools in the United States: Columbia University Graduate School of Journalism, Craig Newmark Graduate School of Journalism, and the UC Berkeley Graduate School of Journalism.

Many universities have both graduate and undergraduate programs within dedicated professional schools. Two such examples are the Henry W. Grady College of Journalism and Mass Communication at the University of Georgia and the UNC Hussman School of Journalism and Media at the University of North Carolina at Chapel Hill.

Editor & Publisher has presented an unranked list of leading journalism schools, while U.S. News & World Report produces annual lists of the top schools in advertising, print, and other categories based on responses to questionnaires sent to deans and faculty members. A list based on a variety of resources claims to identify the "ten most popular journalism schools in the United States". One critic has pointed to the anecdotal nature of much j-school ranking in the absence of effective tracking of journalism graduates' career paths.

== Oceania ==
=== Australia ===
In Australia, a ranking of journalism schools has been assembled based on graduating students' assessments of the quality of their courses. The ranking, based on student satisfaction ratings over four years, are Jschool Journalism College in Brisbane, University of the Sunshine Coast in Queensland, University of Western Sydney, Murdoch University in Western Australia and the University of Technology, Sydney. Figures indicated 100 percent satisfaction among students at Bond University and Jschool (both in Queensland), and 85 percent among students at the Universities of Canberra, Newcastle and the Sunshine Coast. Employment rates are mixed, with an estimated 20 percent of university journalism graduates achieving journalism positions in the media, although Jschool has a 63 percent employment rate. A list of journalism graduates in employment shows city-based technological universities with the highest numbers of graduates in media positions, including QUT in Brisbane, RMIT in Melbourne and UTS in Sydney. The biggest employers have been the Australian Broadcasting Corporation, Channel Nine, Channel Seven, Sydney Morning Herald and Special Broadcasting Service, although there has been much downsizing of newsrooms since the figures were assembled.

=== New Zealand ===
The New Zealand Training Organisation has published a list of New Zealand's journalism schools recognised by industry.

The New Zealand Institute of Business Studies has been teaching Freelance Journalism & Non-Fiction Writing for more than 20 years. Training is less 'academic-focused' and more 'income-earning' focused. Graduates are given a fortnightly list of journalism job vacancies.

== South America ==
An evaluation of developments in journalism education in Latin America has been undertaken by Rosental Calmon Alves.

=== Colombia ===
In Colombia, the high court determined in 1998 that journalism was not a career. This court said that journalism is a human right, not a profession.

Because of the ruling there are many schools of communications in Colombia where people study to work in mainly enterprises, but not in mass media.

There are many schools of journalism, at undergraduate level the main ones being: University of Antioquia, a public institution in Medellín, offers Journalism inside the Communications faculty, and University of Rosario in Bogotá, a private institution, offers Public Opinion Journalism, and the Externado University, a private institution, offers a degree in Social Communication and Journalism.

=== Chile ===
In Chile, universities with journalism impart the profession as a full five-year degree. With a grade of "bachelor in social communications" and professional title of journalist, there currently exist more than 30 journalism schools in the country. The national system has an accrediting council that independently certifies the universities as a whole and each of the careers. Nevertheless, only a few are accredited.

The top schools in the country are the Faculty of Communications of the Pontifical Catholic University of Chile, accredited by US's ACEJMC, and the Institute of Communication and Image of the University of Chile, accredited by the National Accrediting Council (CNA). Outside Santiago, the top school is the School of Journalism of the Pontifical Catholic University of Valparaiso, also accredited by the CNA.

== Debate about role ==
One of the most cited critiques of a journalism school was Michael Lewis's article in The New Republic (1993), "J-school ate my brain", which was strongly criticized by University of Maryland College of Journalism dean Reese Cleghorn in American Journalism Review. Discussion of the issues raised by Lewis was evident a decade later in the Chronicle of Higher Education colloquy on journalism education, Columbia Journalism Review's "Searching for the perfect j-school", and "The j-school debate" in the Christian Science Monitor. Alternative approaches to journalism education were suggested in Jack Shafer's Slate article "Can J-school be saved? Professional advice for Columbia University". An article in The Australian discusses "What makes a good school of journalism".

On the internet, a range of weblogs have been set up by journalism students to chronicle or to criticize their journalism colleges. Examples are: "jschoolyear", "jschool05", "the pod" blogspot, "jschool" blog, Australia. An example of a weblog criticising university journalism education in Australia is "What's wrong with the school". One journalism school in the UK, at the University of Westminster, has established a clearing house where all students are expected to contribute to the development and content of their own education and training using blogs.

Various commentaries on journalism education are related to criticisms of contemporary news media standards and values. One example is a paper by Jan Schaffer, executive director of J-Lab: the Institute for Interactive Journalism. A controversial paper to Australia's peak newspaper industry body PANPA (Pacific Area Newspaper Publishers Association) by Professor John Henningham ("Journalism sold short in media courses") blamed industry lack of interest and university cost-cutting for falling standards in journalism education. In Canada, Mark Anderson of the Ottawa Citizen has argued the case for teaching business journalism in college rather than on the job. Canadian journalism professor Rick MacLean has rejected criticism by Robert Fulford ("Just what is the point of j-school") that the best potential journalists will find their way into the media, while many existing j-school students show no interest in news or the media. MacLean argues that education in journalism helps empower members of the public to understand how media work.

== List of schools and programs ==
- Journalism schools in Africa
- Journalism schools in Asia
- Journalism schools in Europe
- Journalism schools in North America
- Journalism schools in South America

== See also ==
- Association for Education in Journalism and Mass Communication
- Donald K. Fry
- Journalism Education Association
- National Association of Hispanic Journalists
- Nieman Foundation for Journalism
- Religion Newswriters Association
