= List of journalism schools in Europe =

This is a list of journalism schools in Europe.

== Albania ==
- Instituti Shqiptar i Medias (Albanian Media Institute) - Tirana

== Armenia ==
- Russian-Armenian (Slavonic) University Faculty of Journalism - Yerevan
- Yerevan State Linguistic University Department of Linguistics and Intercultural Communication - Yerevan
- Yerevan State University Department of Journalism - Yerevan

== Austria ==
- Center for Journalism and Communication Management, Danube University - Krems
- fjum_forum journalismus und medien - Vienna
- Kuratorium für Journalistenausbildung - Salzburg
- South East and Central Europe PR Organisation - SECEPRO Master Programme - Vienna

== Azerbaijan ==
- Baku Slavic University
- Department of Journalism Khazar University - Baku

== Belgium ==
=== French Community of Belgium ===
- UCLouvain, Louvain School of Journalism - Louvain-la-Neuve and Mons
- University of Liège (ULiège), Department of Media, Culture and Communication - Liège
- IHECS Brussels School of Journalism (Institut des hautes études des communications sociales) - Brussels
- Saint-Louis University, Brussels (UCLouvain) - Brussels

=== Flemish Community of Belgium ===
- AP Hogeschool - Antwerp
- Artevelde Hogeschool - Ghent
- Erasmushogeschool - Brussels
- Institute XIOS Hogeschool - Limburg
- Thomas More - Antwerpen

== Bulgaria ==
- Sofia University - Sofia
- Department of Media and Public Communications, University of National and World Economy - Sofia

== Denmark ==
- Centre for Journalism, Department of Political Science, University of Southern Denmark - Odense
- Institute Danish School of Media and Journalism - Aarhus & Copenhagen

== Estonia ==
- Tallinn University - Tallinn
- University of Tartu - Tartu

== Finland ==
- Haaga-Helia University of Applied Sciences - Helsinki
- Institute University of Helsinki - Helsinki
- University of Jyvaskyla - Jyvaskyla
- University of Tampere - Tampere
- The Voionmaa Institute - Ylöjärvi
- Åbo Akademi University - Turku
- University of Turku - Turku

== France ==
=== University schools ===
- Master in Journalism - Centre universitaire d'enseignement du journalisme (CUEJ) - Strasbourg
- Bachelor in Journalism - Lannion Institute of Technology (IUT), University of Rennes - Lannion
- Bachelor in Journalism - École de Journalisme de Cannes (EJC), Côte d'Azur University - Cannes
- Centre d'Études Littéraires et Scientifiques Appliquées (CELSA), Sorbonne University - Paris
- École de Journalisme et de Communication d'Aix-Marseille (EJCAM), Aix-Marseille University - Marseille
- École du Journalisme de Nice - Nice, France
- École Publique de Journalisme de Tours (EPJT), University of Tours - Tours
- École de Journalisme de Grenoble (EJDG), Grenoble Alpes University - Grenoble
- Master in Journalism, Paris Institute of Political Science - Paris
- Institut de Journalisme Bordeaux-Aquitaine (IJBA), Bordeaux Montaigne University - Bordeaux
- Institut Français de Presse (IFP), Panthéon-Assas University - Paris
- Institut Pratique de Journalisme (IPJ), PSL University - Paris

=== Independent schools ===
- Centre de Formation des Journalistes (CFJ), Paris-based Journalism School - Paris
- École Supérieure de Journalisme de Lille (ESJ) - Lille
- École Supérieure de Journalisme de Montpellier (ESJ PRO) - Montpellier
- École de Journalisme de Toulouse (EJT) - Toulouse
- École Française de Journalisme (EFJ) - Bordeaux

== Georgia ==
- Georgian Institute of Public Affairs, Caucasus School of Journalism and Media Management - Tbilisi
- Teimuraz Paperashvili T.V.-creative studio-Grigol Robakidze University-Tbilisi

== Germany ==
- Deutsche Journalistenschule - Munich
- Freie Journalistenschule - Berlin
- Henri-Nannen-Schule - Hamburg
- Hochschule Bonn-Rhein-Sieg University for Applied Sciences - Sankt Augustin
- Jade University of Applied Sciences Institute for Media Management and Journalism - Wilhelmshaven
- Kölner Journalistenschule für Politik und Wirtschaft - Köln
- Macromedia University of Applied Sciences for Media and Communication - Munich, Stuttgart, Cologne, Hamburg and Berlin
- MedienQualifizierung GmbH - Akademie für Hörfunk und Medien - Köln
- Universität Leipzig, Institut für Journalistik - Leipzig

== Greece ==
- Aristotle University of Thessaloniki (AUTh) School of Journalism and Mass Communications - Thessaloniki - MA in Digital Media, Communication and Journalism (1 year, 90 ECTS, English language)

The MA program offers the following three distinct pathways:

- Digital Media, Culture and Communication
- European Journalism
- Risk Communication and Crisis Journalism

== Hungary ==
- Bálint György Academy of Journalism, National Association of Hungarian Journalists - Budapest
- Budapest Metropolitan University - Budapest

== Ireland ==
- Dublin Institute of Technology - Dublin
- NUI Galway - Galway

== Italy ==
- Catholic University of Milan (Università Cattolica del Sacro Cuore) - Milan
- Master universitario in Giornalismo, IULM University of Milan - Milano
- Scuola di Giornalismo Radiotelevisivo di Perugia (Rai, Radiotelevisione Italiana) - Perugia
- Scuola Superiore di Giornalismo "Massimo Baldini" - LUISS Guido Carli - Rome

== Lithuania ==
- University of Vilnius - Vilnius

== North Macedonia ==
- School of Journalism and Public Relations - Skopje

== Netherlands ==
- Christelijke Hogeschool - Ede
- Department of Journalism, University of Groningen - Groningen
- Fontys Hogeschool Journalistiek - Tilburg
- European Journalism Centre - Maastricht
- Hogeschool Windesheim (Windesheim University of Applied Science) - Zwolle
- School voor Journalistiek, Hogeschool Utrecht - Utrecht

== Norway ==
- Oslo and Akershus University College of Applied Sciences - Oslo

== Poland ==
- Institute of Media Education and Journalism - Faculty of Theology - University of Cardinal Stefan Wyszyński - Warsaw

== Portugal ==
- Autónoma University - Lisbon
- CENJOR - Centre for Training in Journalism - Lisbon
- Lisbon Polytechnic Institute - Superior School of Communications - Lisbon
- Lisbon University Institute - IUL - Lisbon
- Nova University of Lisbon - Faculty of Human and Social Sciences - Lisbon
- Portuguese Catholic University - Lisbon
- University of Beiras - Covilhã
- University of Coimbra - Faculty of Letters/ Journalism Institute - Coimbra
- University of Minho - Braga
- University of Oporto - Faculty of Letters - Oporto

== Romania ==
- Babeș-Bolyai University - Babeș-Bolyai

== Russia ==
- Department of Mass Communication of the Institute of Humanities of the Novosibirsk State University, Novosibirsk
- Faculty of Journalism, Humanities Institute of TV & Radio Broadcasting named after M.A. Litovchin, Moscow
- Faculty of Journalism of the International University in Moscow, Moscow
- Faculty of Journalism of the Moscow State University named after M.V. Lomonosov, Moscow
- Higher School of Journalism and Mass Communication of the Saint Petersburg State University, Saint Petersburg
- Vladimir Mezentsev school of journalism of the Central House of Journalists, Moscow

== Serbia ==
- Department of Journalism, University of Philosophy - Novi Sad
- International Media Center (Portoroz-Ljubljana-Vienna-Belgrade)

== Spain ==
- Universitat Autònoma de Barcelona (UAB) - Barcelona
- Pompeu Fabra University (UPF) - Barcelona
- Autonoma University of Madrid - El País School of Journalism - Madrid
- Carlos III University of Madrid (Getafe) - Madrid
- Complutense University of Madrid - Faculty of Communications - Madrid
- Escuela de Periodismo UAM - El País - Madrid
- University of Santiago de Compostela - Santiago de Compostela
- University of Valencia - Valencia
- IE School of Communication, Master in Digital Journalism - Madrid
- Mondragon University (HUHEZI) - Eskoriatza-Gipuzkoa
- Navarra University - Pamplona
- Rey Juan Carlos University of Madrid - EFE News Agency School - Madrid
- University of the Basque Country - Bilbao
- University of Castilla-La Mancha - Faculty of Journalism - Cuenca
- University of Seville - Seville

== Sweden ==
- Göteborgs Universitet - Göteborgs
- Linnaeus University - Kalmar
- Södertörn University - Huddinge
- University of Stockholm - Stockholm

== Switzerland ==
- MAZ - Die Schweizer Journalistenschule - Luzern
- University of Neuchâtel (AJM Académie du journalisme et des médias) - Neuchâtel
- Zurich University of Applied Sciences (IAM Institute of Applied Media Studies) - Winterthur

== Turkey ==
- Anadolu University - Eskişehir
- Cumhuriyet University - Sivas
- Erciyes University - Kayseri
- Istanbul University - Istanbul
- Istanbul Bilgi University - Istanbul
- Istanbul Medipol University - Istanbul
- Nişantaşı University - Istanbul

== Ukraine ==
- Institute of Journalism Taras Shevchenko National University of Kyiv
- Ivan Franko National University of Lviv
- Kyiv International University
- Mohyla School of Journalism (National University Kyiv-Mohyla Academy)
- The National University of Ostroh Academy - Ostroh
- Sumy State University
- Ukrainian Catholic University - Lviv

== United Kingdom ==
=== England ===
- Birmingham School of Media at Birmingham City University
- Bristol, University of the West of England
- Brunel University
- Goldsmiths, University of London
- City University - London
- Coventry University
- Department of English, University of Buckingham
- Department of Media, University of Chester
- Department of Journalism, University of Sheffield
- Department of Media, Culture and Language, University of Roehampton
- Faculty of Arts, University of Brighton
- Falmouth University
- Leeds Business School, Leeds Metropolitan University
- Leeds Trinity Centre for Journalism, Leeds Trinity University
- Leicester Centre for Journalism, De Montfort University
- London College of Communication, University of the Arts London
- London College of Fashion, University of the Arts London
- London Metropolitan University
- London School of Journalism
- Media School, Bournemouth University
- Middlesex University
- Nottingham Trent University
- School of Arts & Media - Media & Journalism, Teesside University
- School of Humanities, University of Hertfordshire
- School of Journalism & Digital Communication, University of Central Lancashire
- School of Social, Historical and Literary Studies, University of Portsmouth
- University of Lincoln
- University of Westminster

=== Scotland ===
- Aberdeen College
- Adam Smith College
- City of Glasgow College
- Department of Communication, Media and Marketing, Robert Gordon University
- Edinburgh Napier University
- Glasgow Caledonian University
- University of Stirling
- University of Strathclyde
- University of the West of Scotland

=== Wales ===
- Bangor University
- Cardiff University
- Glyndwr University
- Swansea Metropolitan (UWTSD)
- University of South Wales

=== Northern Ireland ===
- Belfast Metropolitan College
- North West Regional College
- Southern Regional College
- University of Ulster
