= List of journalism schools in South America =

There are many journalism schools in South America, often forming faculties of universities. An evaluation of developments in journalism education in Latin America has been undertaken by Rosental Alves.

== Brazil ==
- Communication School of Centro Universitário Augusto Motta
- Communication School of State University of Ponta Grossa
- Communication School of State University of Mato Grosso
- Communication School of Federal University of Rio de Janeiro
- School of Journalism of the Pontifical Catholic University of São Paulo
- Journalism School of the Federal University of Santa Catarina
- School of Communication and the Arts of the University of São Paulo
- Faculdade Cásper Líbero of Social Communication
- School of Arts and Communication at São Paulo State University
- School of Communication at Anhembi Morumbi University
- Social Communication - Journalism at Federal University of Uberlândia
- School of Communication at Methodist University of São Paulo

== Chile ==
- Instituto de Comunicación e Imagen, Universidad de Chile
- Facultad de Comunicaciones (Faculty of Communications), Pontificia Universidad Católica de Chile. This was the first Journalism School outside the US in being accredited by the ACEMJC.

== Colombia ==
- University of Antioquia Journalism career. Rosario university Public Opinion Journalism
