= R v McManus and Harvey =

- Court: County Court of Victoria
- Full case name: R v Gerard Thomas McManus and Michael Harvey
- Decided: 25 June 2007
- Citations: [2007] VCC 619 (PDF), archived from the original (PDF) on 12 July 2009

Court membership
- Judge sitting: Chief Judge Rozens

R v McManus and Harvey is a landmark Australian court case for freedom of the press, whistleblowers and reporters privilege that resulted in journalists gaining greater safeguards to protect their sources.

Gerard McManus and Michael Harvey were journalists at the Herald Sun newspaper in Melbourne in the state of Victoria, Australia. In June 2007 the pair were convicted of contempt of court for refusing to name the source of an exposé the pair wrote on war veterans' entitlements.

The pair’s conviction prompted a widespread debate on journalistic freedom in Australia and resulted in federal and state governments introducing “shield laws” to give judges scope to exempt journalists from revealing their sources during trials.

== Background ==
A February 2004 Herald Sun report written by Harvey and McManus revealed an Australian Federal Government decision to rebuff 60 recommendations for improved financial benefits for returned war servicemen and women, including subsidized funeral costs, while still planning to portray the scaled-down support as a boon for war veterans and widows.

The story prompted a large-scale investigation into the possible source inside the Australian Public Service including Australian Federal Police probing 3,000 telephone extensions and hundreds of mobile phones. However, McManus and Harvey refused to disclose to the Australian Federal Police their source, citing adherence to journalists "Code of Ethics".

== Failure to give evidence ==
A civil servant, Desmond Patrick Kelly, was subsequently charged with a breach of the Commonwealth Crimes Act, but at a pre-trial hearing in August 2005 McManus and Harvey refused to give evidence. Nevertheless, Kelly was still found guilty of leaking confidential material, but in October 2006 the Victorian Court of Appeal overturned the conviction finding there was insufficient evidence to prove that he was the person who leaked the information.

Meanwhile, the McManus-Harvey contempt matter continued and on 25 June 2007 McManus was found guilty of five counts of contempt of court and Harvey was found guilty of four counts. Victorian County Court Chief Judge Michael Rozenes said the offence was a serious one and that he had considered incarcerating the pair. McManus and Harvey were each fined $7,000, and a conviction recorded against them. News Limited supported the pair throughout the hearings as well as other media groups, the Media, Entertainment and Arts Alliance, and the Australian Press Council.

== Reaction to the case ==
The ensuing outcry from the McManus and Harvey convictions prompted both the John Howard and Kevin Rudd Governments to introduce laws to provide some level of protection for journalists regarding their sources in 2007 and 2009. However, both administrations fell before the proposed laws were passed.

== Shield laws ==
Tasmanian independent member of the House of Representatives, Andrew Wilkie, and Queensland Liberal Senator George Brandis respectively introduced Private Member’s Bills in 2009 to provide greater protection for journalists and their sources. Both Bills were referred to the Legal and Constitutional Affairs Legislation Committee, which recommended the Wilkie amendments, based largely on New Zealand "shield laws", were preferable.

Prominent politicians who supported the Wilkie Bill included former Attorney-General Robert McClelland and South Australian independent Senator Nick Xenophon.

During the Parliamentary debate Australian Greens argued the definition of a journalist in the legislation was too narrow and should include “bloggers”.

The Australian Senate passed Andrew Wilkie’s amendments (incorporating the amendments proposed by the Australian Greens to the Commonwealth Evidence Act on 3 March 2011.

Other Australian states, including New South Wales, Victoria and Western Australia and the Australian Capital Territory have also introduced their own "shield laws" but have also elected not to extend protection for bloggers.

== See also ==
- Jschool
