= Peter Kidd =

Australian jurist

His Honour Chief Judge Peter Kidd SC

Chief Judge of the County Court of Victoria
- In office 8 September 2015 – 2025
- Nominated by: Martin Pakula
- Appointed by: Linda Dessau
- Preceded by: Michael Rozenes
- Succeeded by: Amanda Chambers

Justice of the Supreme Court of Victoria
- Incumbent
- Assumed office 24 May 2016
- Nominated by: Martin Pakula
- Appointed by: Linda Dessau

Personal details
- Born: Peter Barrington Kidd; 4 October 1965 (age 60) Adelaide, South Australia
- Education: Prince Alfred College
- Alma mater: University of Adelaide (LLB); University of Genova (LLM)
- Profession: Judge, lawyer

Peter Barrington Kidd SC (born 4 October 1965) is an Australian jurist. He served as Chief Judge of the County Court of Victoria from 8 September 2015 to 2025, and as a Justice of the Supreme Court of Victoria since 24 May 2016.

As chief judge of the County Court, Kidd chaired the County Court's Board of Management and was a member of the Courts Council, the governing body of Court Services Victoria. He also sat on the boards of the Judicial College of Victoria. and the Judicial Commission of Victoria.

In 2018–2019, he presided over the trial of Cardinal George Pell whom he sentenced to six years in jail. In April 2020 the High Court of Australia quashed that verdict because there was "a significant possibility that an innocent person has been convicted because the evidence did not establish guilt to the requisite standard of proof".

Kidd holds a Master of Laws from the University of Geneva, where he specialised in international humanitarian and criminal law, and a Bachelor of Laws from the University of Adelaide.

Kidd was admitted to practice in 1990, and signed the Victoria Bar Roll in 1995.

Between 2005 and 2008, Kidd worked as an International Prosecutor at the War Crimes Chamber of the State Court of Bosnia and Herzegovina, which investigated and tried war crimes, crimes against humanity and genocide committed during the Bosnian conflict in the 1990s.

Kidd joined Victoria's Crown Prosecutors' Chambers in January 2009 after returning to Australia, and in November 2011 he was appointed Senior Counsel. In July 2013 he was appointed a Senior Crown Prosecutor.

Legal offices
Preceded by Michael Rozenes	Chief Judge of the County Court of Victoria; 2015–present	Succeeded by Amanda Chambers
