= Brazilian Association of Investigative Journalism =

Brazilian journalism organization

Associação Brasileira de Jornalismo Investigativo (transl. Brazilian Association of Investigative Journalism; abbreviated as ABRAJI) is an organization for Brazilian journalists wanting to exchange information, experiences, and tips about investigative journalism. They are a non-profit association maintained by the journalists themselves. Some of their goals include: holding congresses, seminars, and specialized workshops; taking care of the professional improvement of journalists; publishing books on the subject; and hosting forums for exchanging experiences.

== History ==
The concept for the ABRAJI was realized in a seminar called Jornalismo Investigativo: Ética, Técnicas e Perigos (transl. Investigative Journalism: Ethics, Techniques and Dangers). The event was organized by the Knight Center for Journalism in the Americas of the University of Texas in Austin and was directed by Brazilian journalist Rosental Alves. There, the journalists asked themselves why there was no Brazilian institution for investigative journalists like Investigative Reporters and Editors in the United States or the Centro de Periodismo de Investigación in Mexico.

A group of 45 journalists from several newsrooms began exchanging emails at the initiative of Marcelo Beraba, the director of the Rio de Janeiro branch of Folha de S. Paulo, a Brazilian newspaper. Following a positive reception and the arrival of new journalists, Rosental Alves organized an email discussion list in the form of a LISTSERV. The computers at the University of Texas, where Alves was teaching, hosted the discussion list.

In 2020, the association conducted its first virtual congress due to the COVID-19 pandemic. The event was free of charge and hosted 10,000 attendees..

== Investigative journalism ==
In 2018, Ctrl+X—a project by the association that monitors attempts to lessen information on the internet—reported that Brazilian politicians went to the Brazilian Election Justice 340 times to hide information published on the internet, such as negative news and posts critical of the 2018 election candidates.

In 2019, data from Ctrl+X reported that more than 800 Brazilian politicians resorted to lawsuits asking for internet content to be removed between 2018 and 2019. In 93.5% of the cases, they claimed "defamation" to censor information.

In a survey done in March 2021, ABRAJI noted that at least 174 journalists had been blocked by Brazilian public figures on Twitter. Among these public figures included president Jair Bolsonaro, his Twitter profile having blocked 50 journalists.

== Books ==
Books written by ABRAJI's associates and promoted by the organization in its website:

- 10 reportagens que abalaram a ditadura (10 news reports that shook the dictatorship), published by Editora Record
- 50 Anos de Crimes – Reportagens policiais que marcaram o jornalismo brasileiro (50 Years of Crime – Police reports that have marked Brazilian journalism), published by Editora Record

== Awards ==
| Year | Category | Institution or publication | Result | Notes | Ref. |
|---|---|---|---|---|---|
| 2003 | Melhor Contribuição à Imprensa (Best Contribution to the Press) | ExxonMobil Journalism Award | Won | for "contributing to the improvement of the quality of journalism, as well as the defense of the professional prerogatives of journalism" | |
| 2012 | Liberdade de Imprensa (Freedom of Press award) | Associação Nacional de Jornais | Won | | |
| 2013 | Personalidade de 2013 (Person of 2013) | Faz Diferença | Won | | |

== See also ==
- Global Investigative Journalism Network, which ABRAJI is part of
- Investigative Reporters and Editors, American association focused in investigative journalism
- Center for Investigative Reporting (Bosnia and Herzegovina)
- Philippine Center for Investigative Journalism
