= Michael Rozenes =

Australian judge

His Honour Michael Rozenes AO KC
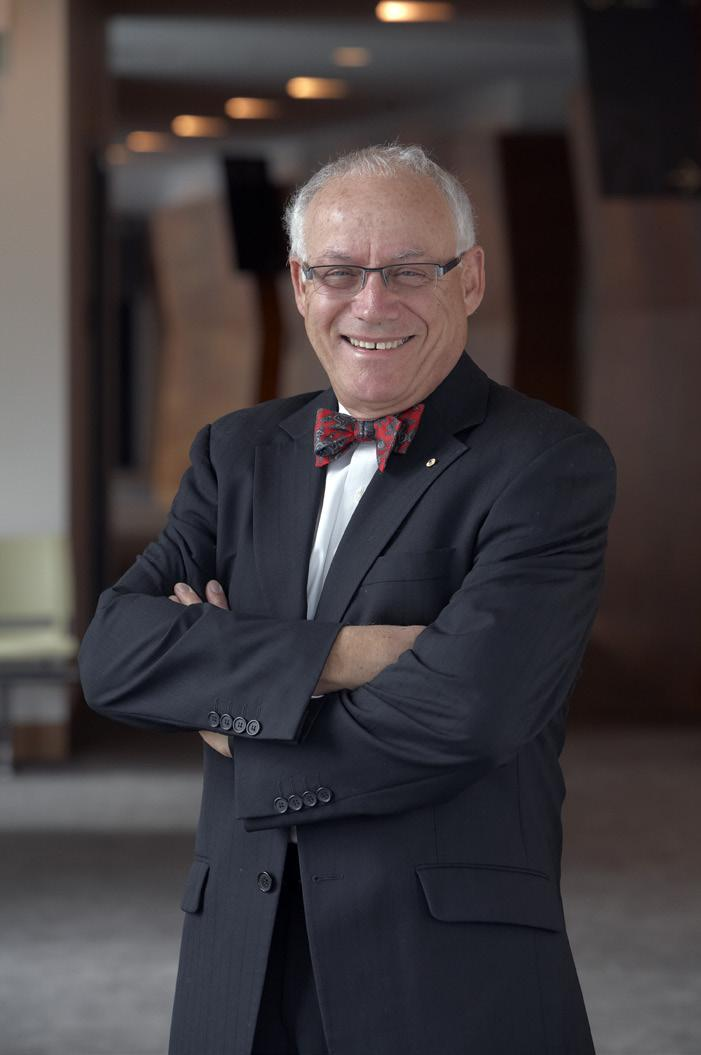

3rd Chief Judge of the County Court of Victoria
- In office 25 November 2002 – 22 June 2015
- Nominated by: Rob Hulls
- Appointed by: John Landy
- Preceded by: Glenn Waldron
- Succeeded by: Peter Kidd

3rd Commonwealth Director of Public Prosecutions
- In office 1 February 1992 – 1997
- Preceded by: Mark Weinberg
- Succeeded by: Brian Ross Martin

Personal details
- Born: 1 August 1946 (age 80) Sosnowiec, Poland
- Education: Monash University

Michael Rozenes AO KC is the former Chief Judge of the County Court of Victoria, an intermediate court in Victoria, Australia. He presided over the County Court for thirteen years, retiring in June 2015.

== Early life ==
Rozenes was born in the Polish city of Sosnowiec and migrated with his family to Australia at the age of three. He was educated at the North Caulfield State School and then at Brighton Grammar School. At Brighton Grammar Rozenes represented the school in football, cricket and tennis and was an accomplished sprinter. He then attended Monash University, graduating with a Bachelor of Jurisprudence in 1967 and a Bachelor of Laws in 1969.

== Professional life ==
After graduating from university, Rozenes then served articles with Frank Galbally of the firm Galbally & O'Bryan and was admitted to the Supreme Courts of Victoria, New South Wales, Tasmania, Queensland, Western Australia and South Australia in 1971, and subsequently signed the Bar Roll in 1972.

From 1972 to 1976 he had a general criminal and common law practice and from 1977 to 1991 he practised exclusively in the criminal jurisdiction with a specialisation in complex taxation, corporate and appellant criminal cases. He appeared before numerous Royal Commissions, including the HIH Royal Commission, Builders' Royal Commission and Melbourne Ambulance Service Royal Commission.

He was appointed a Queen's Counsel in 1986. Over the course of his career at the Bar, Rozenes sat on the Victorian Bar Council, the Criminal Bar Association of Victoria Committee and the Victorian Bar Ethics Committee.

In February 1992, he was appointed Commonwealth Director of Public Prosecutions, and his initial three-year term was extended for a further two years.

In 1997 Rozenes returned to practice at the private Bar and from 1998 to 2001, was Chairman of the Criminal Bar Association of Victoria.

On 25 November 2002 Rozenes was appointed as the Chief Judge of the County Court of Victoria. He retired from the Court on 22 June 2015 and was eventually succeeded as Chief Judge by Senior Crown Prosecutor Peter Kidd SC.

== Honours ==
- Officer of the Order of Australia (2010) for "distinguished service to the judiciary, particularly as Chief Judge of the County Court of Victoria and the Commonwealth Director of Public Prosecutions, and through contributions to law reform and legal education".

== Notable cases ==
Rozenes appeared as Counsel in the following reported cases:

High Court

- Ridgeway v The Queen (1995) 78 A Crim R 307;
- Cheatle v The Queen (1993) 177 CLR 541;
- Dietrich v The Queen (1992) 177 CLR 292;
- Commissioner of Australian Federal Police v Propend Finance Pty Limited (1997) 188 CLR 501;
- Re Rozenes, Director of Public Prosecutions and Another; Ex parte Burd and Others (1994) 120 ALR 193;
- Michaels v The Queen (1995) 184 CLR 117;

Court of Appeal – Supreme Court of Victoria

- Rozenes and Anor v Kelly and Ords [1996] 1 VR 320

County Court of Victoria

- "R v McManus and Harvey" (Victorian County Court, June 2007) Rozenes presided over the landmark media case during which two journalists (Gerard McManus & Michael Harvey) refused to reveal their sources for a story they wrote for the Herald Sun newspaper. In sentencing the two journalists, Rozenes said: "Courts in Australia and England have made clear statements to the effect that journalists are not above the law and may not without penalty expect to be permitted to follow their personal collegiate standards where those standards conflict with the law of the land. Until that law is altered, if it is ever to be, then journalists remain in no different position than all other citizens." As a consequence of the case, federal and state governments in Australia moved to change the law to permit judges discretion to take into consideration the journalist's code of never revealing their source.

Junior in

- A v Hayden ("ASIS Case") (1984) 156 CLR 532 to G. Griffith QC;
- Baker Plaintiff; and Campbell Defendant 153 CLR 52 to D M J Bennett QC.

== Board memberships ==
- Current board member, Judicial College of Victoria.
- Current board member, Monash Law Foundation.
- Current chairman, Victorian Electoral Boundaries Commission.
- Current Convener, Life in the Law; a support group for law practitioners who are considering leaving the legal profession.
- Former Council Member, Australasian Institute of Judicial Administration; Member, Project and Research Committee.
- Former board member, Victorian Council of Legal Education.
- Co-Chair, Australian Criminal Law National Liaison Committee, Law Council of Australia, 2002.
- Member, Working Group on Criminal Trial Procedure, Standing Committee of Attorneys-General, 1999.

== See also ==
- County Court of Victoria
- Judiciary of Australia
- Australian court hierarchy

Legal offices
| Preceded by Glenn Waldron | Chief Judge of the County Court of Victoria; 2002–2015 | Succeeded by Peter Kidd |
| Preceded by Mark Weinberg | Commonwealth Director of Public Prosecutions; 1992–1997 | Succeeded by Brian Ross Martin |
