= Stig Kristensen =

Dutch artist and author

- Born: 25 December 1985 (age 40)
- Occupations: Cartoonist, illustrator
- Known for: Stig's Stribe in Fyens Stiftstidende

Stig Kristensen (born 25 December 1985), is a Danish cartoonist and illustrator, and author of the Danish comic strip "Stig's Stribe" (Stig's Strip in English) which currently is published in the Danish newspaper, Fyens Stiftstidende. Stig's Stribe has appeared on the paper's back page since November 2007.

== Career ==
Stig won DR (broadcaster)'s national cartoon strip competition in 2007, sparking his interest in turning a hobby into a profession. The competition was judged, among others, by renowned Danish cartoonist Anders Morgenthaler, co-creator of Wulffmorgenthaler. As a prize, he won 5000 Danish kroner with which he bought a graphics tablet, compiled some rough cartoon strip ideas and approached Fyens Stiftstidende with them in 2007. He was signed with the newspaper as a freelance cartoonist and his cartoons began appearing from 26 November 2007.

Aside from his cartoon strip, Stig has illustrated two books, "SMS Digte" (2007) by Bjarne Kim Pedersen and "Historien Om De To Skovmus" (2009) by Finn Jeppesen.

== Stig's Stribe ==
His cartoon strip could be described as the gag strip variety, as it is (almost always) a single window drawing. There are no specific main characters, like in Calvin and Hobbes or Garfield, but there are recurring characters and personalities which appear, e.g. the two goldfish. He often references current issues in the news or pop culture.

According to his Facebook group, Stig is currently in the process of translating all his cartoons from Danish to English for his upcoming website.
