= John Henningham =

John Henningham is an Australian journalist and journalism educator. The first Professor of Journalism in Australia, he was also the first Australian to be awarded a PhD in Journalism.

== Early career ==
Henningham graduated from the University of Sydney and worked as a journalist with newspapers the Daily Mirror, The Sun and The Australian and the ABC before entering journalism education.

He joined the staff of the University of Queensland in 1978 and was responsible for the university's establishing the Department of Journalism in 1991.

He is founder and director of the journalism college Jschool He was previously head of the Department of Journalism at the University of Queensland.

Henningham has written and edited books, journals, chapters and articles on journalism and the news media, including Looking at Television News, Issues in Australian Journalism, and Institutions in Australian Society, and has been a media commentator in the press and on radio. His best-known research is based on national surveys of journalists in Australia,

He has also been a strong advocate of journalism education, arguing the case for its distinct purpose and the need to separate it from other forms of communication.

Henningham was founding editor of Australian Studies in Journalism and Australian Journalism Monographs and has also edited Australian Journalism Review, published by the Journalism Education Association. He has been a visiting fellow and researcher at the East-West Center, the Reuter Foundation at Green College, Oxford University, and the London College of Printing, as well as visiting professor of journalism at Deakin University, Victoria. He is adjunct professor at University of the Sunshine Coast and a director of the Asia Pacific Journalism Centre.
