= Gerard McManus =

Australian journalist (born 1960)

Gerard McManus (born 28 June 1960) is an Australian journalist, magazine columnist, and media consultant.

== Education ==
McManus was educated at the University of New England and his newspaper cadetship was with the Centralian Advocate in Alice Springs.

== Career ==
He has worked as business editor of the Sunday Herald Sun, political editor of the Sunday Herald Sun, and political correspondent for the Herald Sun in the Federal Parliamentary Press Gallery. He left the Press Gallery in 2009.

=== R v McManus and Harvey ===
In June 2007, in R v McManus and Harvey, McManus and fellow Herald Sun journalist Michael Harvey were convicted of contempt of court for refusing to disclose a source used in a story they wrote on entitlements for war veterans and widows. The ensuing controversy resulted in pressure on both Federal and state governments to introduce "shield laws" to protect journalists.

== Awards ==
McManus is a Melbourne Quill winner, a recipient of News Limited’s Chairman’s Award and a Walkley Award judge. In 2007 Brisbane’s Jschool awarded Michael Harvey and McManus honorary doctorates in honour of the courage shown in their upholding of the journalist code of ethics .

== Controversy ==
In the lead-up to the 2004 Federal election, McManus wrote an inflammatory article in the Herald Sun on the Australian Greens policies that was strongly criticized by Greens leader, Bob Brown, and other prominent Greens politicians. The article claimed that the Greens had a policy to introduce over-the-counter heroin at pharmacies. Senator Brown made an official complaint to the Australian Press Council (Adjudication 1270), which handed down a highly critical finding against the Herald Sun, describing McManus’ article as "irresponsible journalism".

"In the context of an approaching election, the potential damage was considerable," the APC Adjudication found.

McManus was awarded the 2004 "Hack of the year" mock award by Hack Watch, an independent blogging site, for the article.
