= List of journalism schools in North America =

This is a list of journalism schools in North America.

== Canada ==
=== Undergraduate programs ===
- Toronto Metropolitan University, Toronto, Ontario
- Carleton University, Ottawa, Ontario
- Concordia University, Montreal, Quebec
- University of King's College, Halifax, Nova Scotia
- University of Toronto Scarborough, Toronto, Ontario
- University of Guelph-Humber Toronto, Ontario
- University of Ottawa, Ottawa, Ontario
- Laurentian University, Sudbury, Ontario
- University of Prince Edward Island Charlottetown, Prince Edward Island
- Trent University, Peterborough, Ontario
- University of Regina, Regina, Saskatchewan
- University of Winnipeg, Winnipeg, Manitoba
- Kwantlen University College, Richmond, British Columbia
- MacEwan University, Edmonton, Alberta
- Mount Royal University, Calgary, Alberta
- St. Thomas University, Fredericton, New Brunswick
- Thompson Rivers University, Kamloops, British Columbia
- Université de Montréal, Montreal, Quebec
- Université du Québec à Montréal, Montreal, Quebec
- Vancouver Island University, Nanaimo, British Columbia
- Wilfrid Laurier University, Brantford, Ontario

=== Graduate programs ===
- Carleton University, Ottawa, Ontario
- Concordia University, Montreal, Quebec
- Ryerson University, Toronto, Ontario
- Université Laval, Laval, Quebec
- University of British Columbia, Vancouver, British Columbia
- University of King's College, Halifax, Nova Scotia
- University of Western Ontario, London, Ontario

=== Diploma programs ===
- Western Academy Broadcasting College, Saskatoon, Saskatchewan
- Algonquin College, Ottawa, Ontario
- British Columbia Institute of Technology, Burnaby, British Columbia
- Canadore College, North Bay, Ontario
- Centennial College, Toronto, Ontario
- College of the North Atlantic, Stephenville, Newfoundland and Labrador
- Conestoga College, Kitchener, Ontario
- Durham College, Oshawa, Ontario
- Fanshawe College, London, Ontario
- Holland College, Charlottetown, Prince Edward Island
- Humber College, Toronto, Ontario
- La Cité Collégiale, Ottawa, Ontario
- Langara College, Vancouver, British Columbia
- Lethbridge Community College, Lethbridge, Alberta
- Loyalist College, Belleville, Ontario
- Mohawk College, Hamilton, Ontario
- New Brunswick Community College, Woodstock, New Brunswick
- Niagara College, Welland, Ontario
- Northern Alberta Institute of Technology, Edmonton, Alberta
- Red River College, Winnipeg, Manitoba
- St. Clair College, Windsor, Ontario
- St. Lawrence College, Cornwall, Ontario
- Seneca College of Applied Arts and Technology, Toronto, Ontario
- Sheridan College, Brampton, Ontario
- Southern Alberta Institute of Technology, Calgary, Alberta

== Mexico ==
- Escuela de Periodismo Carlos Septién García
- School of Journalism, Department of Communication and Journalism, Monterrey Institute of Technology and Higher Education, Monterrey

== United States ==
=== Independent graduate programs ===
- Graduate Program in Journalism, Harvard Extension School, Faculty of Arts & Sciences, Harvard University, Massachusetts
- Graduate Program in Journalism, School of Humanities and Sciences, Stanford University, California

=== Professional schools (graduate-only) ===
- Columbia University Graduate School of Journalism, at Columbia University
- Craig Newmark Graduate School of Journalism, at the City University of New York
- UC Berkeley Graduate School of Journalism, at the University of California, Berkeley

=== Professional schools (named) ===
- A.Q. Miller School of Journalism and Mass Communications, at Kansas State University
- Annenberg School for Communication, at the University of Pennsylvania
- Annenberg School for Communication and Journalism, at the University of Southern California
- Arthur L. Carter Journalism Institute, at New York University
- Manship School of Mass Communication, at Louisiana State University
- E. W. Scripps School of Journalism, at Ohio University
- Edward R. Murrow College of Communication, at Washington State University
- Greenlee School of Journalism and Communication, College of Liberal Arts and Sciences, Iowa State University
- Henry W. Grady College of Journalism and Mass Communication, at the University of Georgia
- Hussman School of Journalism and Media, at the University of North Carolina at Chapel Hill
- Hank Greenspun School of Journalism and Media Studies, at the University of Nevada at Las Vegas
- Jack J. Valenti School of Communication, at the University of Houston
- Mayborn School of Journalism, at the University of North Texas
- Medill School of Journalism, at Northwestern University
- Perley Isaac Reed School of Journalism, at West Virginia University
- Philip Merrill College of Journalism, at the University of Maryland
- Reynolds School of Journalism, at the University of Nevada, Reno
- Robertson School of Media and Culture, at Virginia Commonwealth University
- Russell J. Jandoli School of Journalism and Mass Communication, at St. Bonaventure University
- S. I. Newhouse School of Public Communications, at Syracuse University
- Schieffer School of Journalism, College of Communication, at Texas Christian University
- W. Page Pitt School of Journalism and Mass Communications, at Marshall University
- Walter Cronkite School of Journalism and Mass Communication, at Arizona State University
- Washington Journalism Center in Washington, D.C.
- William Allen White School of Journalism, at the University of Kansas

=== Professional schools (unnamed) ===
- Missouri School of Journalism, at the University of Missouri
- School of Communication, College of Arts and Sciences, at Ohio State University
- School of Communication, College of Social and Behavioral Sciences, at Northern Arizona University
- School of Communication, at Point Park University
- School of Communication, at the University of Miami
- School of Communication & Media, Radow College of Humanities and Social Sciences, at Kennesaw State University
- School of Communication and Multimedia Studies, Dorothy F. Schmidt College of Arts and Letters, at Florida Atlantic University
- School of Communication, Media and the Arts, at State University of New York at Oswego
- School of Communications, at Elon University
- School of Communications, College of Social Sciences, at the University of Hawaii at Manoa
- Northeastern University School of Journalism, at Northeastern University
- School of Journalism, College of Communication, at the University of Texas
- School of Journalism, College of Communication Arts and Sciences, at Michigan State University
- School of Journalism, College of Mass Communication and Media Arts, at Southern Illinois University Carbondale
- School of Journalism, College of Social and Behavioral Sciences, at the University of Arizona
- School of Journalism, at Indiana University
- School of Journalism, at State University of New York at Stony Brook
- School of Journalism, at the University of Florida
- School of Journalism, at the University of Montana
- School of Journalism and Broadcasting, Potter College of Arts and Letters, at Western Kentucky University
- School of Journalism and Communication, at Southern Adventist University
- School of Journalism & Graphic Communication, at Florida A&M University
- School of Journalism and Communication, at the University of Oregon
- School of Journalism and Mass Communication, College of Fine Arts and Communication, at Texas State University
- School of Journalism and Mass Communication, College of Liberal Arts, at the University of Minnesota
- School of Journalism and Mass Communication, College of Liberal Arts & Sciences, at the University of Iowa
- School of Journalism and Mass Communication, at Drake University
- School of Journalism and Mass Communication, at Florida International University
- School of Journalism and Mass Communication, at Kent State University
- School of Journalism and Mass Communication, at Lenoir Rhyne University
- School of Journalism and Mass Communication, at the University of Colorado at Boulder
- School of Journalism and Mass Communication, at the University of Wisconsin–Madison
- School of Journalism and Mass Communications, College of Applied Arts and Sciences, at San Jose State University
- School of Journalism and Mass Communications, College of Mass Communications and Information Studies, at the University of South Carolina
- School of Journalism and New Media, at the University of Mississippi
- School of Journalism and Strategic Media, J. William Fulbright College of Arts and Sciences, at the University of Arkansas
- School of Mass Communication and Journalism, at the University of Southern Mississippi
- School of Mass Communication, College of Social Science & Communication, at the University of Arkansas at Little Rock
- School of Mass Communications, College of Arts and Sciences, at the University of South Florida
- School of Media and Public Affairs, at The George Washington University
- School of Media Arts and Design, at James Madison University
- School of Journalism and Media, at the University of Tennessee, Knoxville

=== Departments ===
- Department of Communication, College of Arts and Communication, University of Wisconsin Whitewater
- Department of Communication, College of Arts, Humanities, and Social Sciences, North Dakota State University
- Department of Communication, College of Fine, Performing, and Communication Arts, Wayne State University, Michigan
- Department of Communication, College of Letters and Science, University of Wisconsin-Oshkosh
- Departments of Communication and English, Wittenberg University, Ohio
- Department of Communication/Journalism, College of Arts & Sciences, Shippensburg University of Pennsylvania
- Department of Journalism, College of Communication, Boston University
- Department of Journalism, College of Communication and Education, California State University Chico
- Department of Journalism, College of Communications, Pennsylvania State University
- Department of Journalism, College of Communication and Information Sciences, The University of Alabama
- Department of Journalism, College of Communication, Information, and Media, Ball State University, Indiana
- Department of Journalism, College of Humanities, San Francisco State University
- Department of Journalism, College of Journalism and Mass Communications, University of Nebraska
- Department of Journalism, College of Liberal Arts, California Polytechnic State University
- Department of Journalism, College of Media, University of Illinois Urbana-Champaign
- Department of Journalism, Eastern Illinois University
- Department of Journalism, Emerson College, Massachusetts
- Department of Journalism, Gaylord College of Journalism and Mass Communication, University of Oklahoma
- Department of Journalism, Harrington School of Communication and Media, University of Rhode Island
- Department of Journalism, Henry W. Grady College of Journalism and Mass Communication, University of Georgia
- Department of Journalism, Mike Curb College of Arts, Media and Communication, California State University, Northridge
- Department of Journalism, Roy H. Park School of Communications, Ithaca College, New York
- Department of Journalism, School of Communication, American University, Washington, D.C.
- Department of Journalism, Advertising, and Media Studies, College of Letters and Science, University of Wisconsin–Milwaukee
- Department of Journalism and Communications, College of Humanities and Social Sciences, Utah State University
- Department of Journalism and Mass Communication, College of Arts and Sciences, Abilene Christian University, Texas
- Department of Journalism and Mass Communications, College of Business, Murray State University, Kentucky
- Department of Journalism and Mass Communication, College of Liberal Arts, California State University Long Beach
- Department of Journalism and Media Studies, College of Arts and Sciences, University of South Florida St. Petersburg
- Department of Journalism and Public Relations, School of Media and Communication, Bowling Green State University, Ohio
- Department of Journalism and Strategic Media, College of Communication and Fine Arts University of Memphis, Tennessee
- Department of Journalism and Technical Communication, College of Liberal Arts, Colorado State University
- Department of Journalism, Media Studies, and Public Relations, The Lawrence Herbert School of Communication, Hofstra University, New York
- Department of Journalism, Public Relations and New Media, Baylor University, Texas
- Department of Journalism, School of Communications, Howard University, Washington, D.C.
- Department of Journalism, School of Communications and Theater, Temple University, Pennsylvania
- Department of Mass Communication and Journalism, College of Arts and Humanities, California State University Fresno
- Department of Television, Film, and Media Studies, College of Arts and Letters, California State University Los Angeles
- Departments of Journalism and Language & Communication, College of Arts, Letters, Graduate Studies, and Research, Northwestern State University, Louisiana
- Tim Russert Department of Communication, College of Arts and Sciences, John Carroll University, Ohio
