= List of journalism schools in Africa =

This is a list of journalism schools in Africa.

== Ethiopia ==
- School of Journalism and Communications Addis Ababa University

== Ghana ==
- School of Communication Studies, University of Ghana
- Ghana Institute of Journalism
- African University College of Communications

== Morocco ==
- ESJ-Casablanca / Ecole Supérieure de Journalisme et de Communication.

== Tunisia ==
- ESJ Tunis / Ecole Supérieure de Journalisme
- Institut de Presse et des Sciences de l'Information
- Ecole de journalisme et Cinéma Tunisie - Université Centrale

== Nigeria ==
- Nigerian Institute of Journalism

== South Africa ==
- Department of Journalism, Stellenbosch University
- School of Journalism and Media Studies, Rhodes University
- Department of Journalism, Tshwane University of Technology
- School of Literature, Language and Media, University of the Witwatersrand
- Center for Film & Media Studies, University of Cape Town
- Communication Studies, North-West University
- Media and Cultural Studies, University of Kwazulu-Natal
- Department of Journalism, Film and Television, University of Johannesburg
- Department of Media, Media Department Cape Peninsula University of Technology
