= Fyens Stiftstidende =

Danish daily newspaper

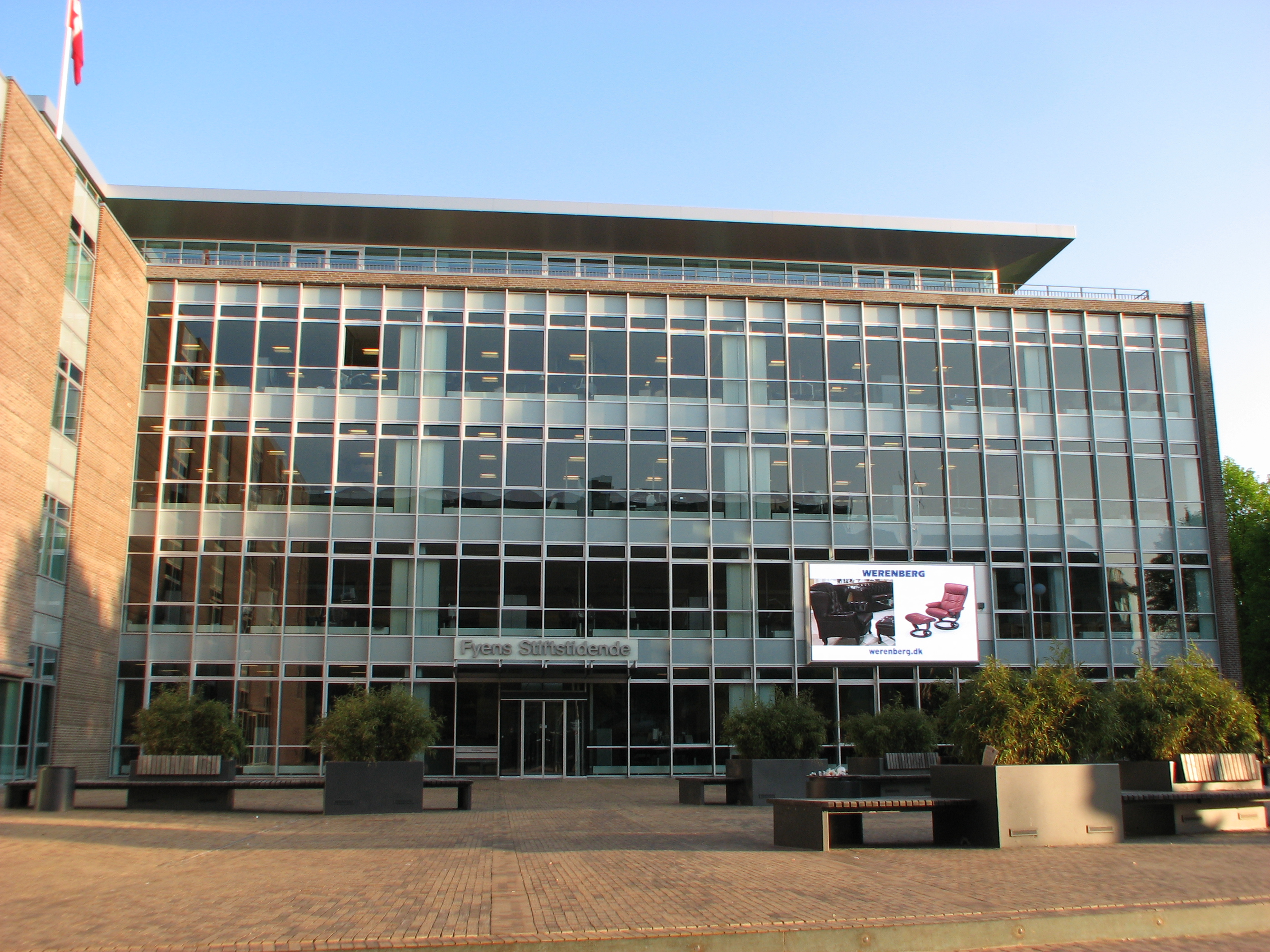
- Fyens Stiftstidende's publishing house, Odense
- Type: Daily newspaper
- Format: Broadsheet
- Owner: Den Fynske Bladfond
- Publisher: Fyens Stiftstidende A/S
- Editor: Per Westergård
- Founded: 3 January 1772; 254 years ago
- Political alignment: Independent conservative
- Headquarters: Odense, Denmark
- Website: www.fyens.dk

Fyens Stiftstidende is a daily newspaper in Denmark and has its headquarters in Odense. The paper serves for Funen.

== History and profile ==
Fyens Stiftstidende's logo, pre 2010

The newspaper was first published on 3 January 1772. It was part of the Stiftstidende dailies. The other two Stiftstidende newspapers were published in Aalborg, Aalborg Stiftstidende, which was founded in 1767, and in Aarhus, namely Århus Stiftstidende, which was started in 1794. Until 1841 the newspaper was known as Kongelig Priviligerede Odense Adresse-Contoirs Efterretninger. On 13 April 1993 it changed its 221-year-old tradition as a midday newspaper, to a morning paper. The paper serves for the island of Funen and has its headquarters in Odense. It is published in broadsheet format.

Since 1975 Fyens Stiftstidende has had no political affiliation. Before that the paper was close to the Conservative People's Party. However, the paper continues to hold a conservative stance.

Since November 2007, "Stig's Stribe" (meaning Stig's Strip in English) has appeared in the newspaper from Monday through Friday all year round. The cartoon strip is of the gag strip variety and was created by Danish cartoonist/illustrator Stig Kristensen. Originally, it was placed above the other "regulars" Fyens Stiftstidende ran, Pearls Before Swine and Up and Running, but starting from February 2009 they moved those inside the newspaper featuring only "Stig's Stribe" on the back page.

The editor in chief of the paper is Per Westergård and he chairs the board of the Centre for Journalism at the University of Southern Denmark in Odense, one of the two university journalism departments in Denmark.

== Circulation ==
In 1910 Fyens Stiftstidende sold 8,400 copies. The circulation of the paper was 66,000 copies on weekdays and 89,000 copies on Sundays in the first quarter of 2000, making it one of the top 20 newspapers in the country. The paper had a circulation of 62,000 copies both in 2002 and in 2003. Its 2004 circulation was 62,000 copies.

Fyens Stiftstidende had a circulation of 57,970 copies in 2006 and 56,036 copies in 2007. The paper sold 45,858 copies in 2013.
