= Marcelo Beraba =

Brazilian journalist (1951–2025)

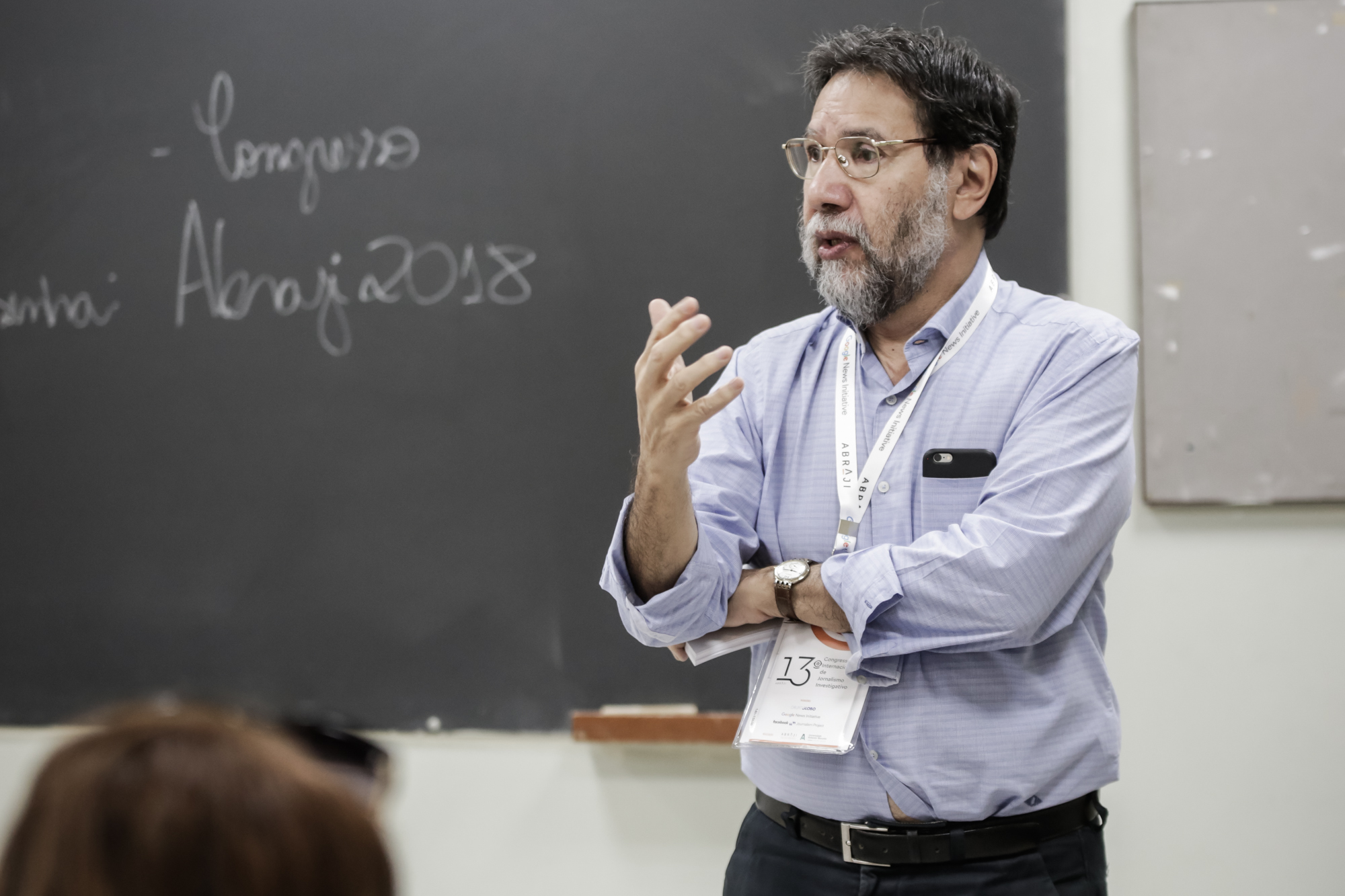
Beraba in 2018

Marcelo José Beraba (29 April 1951 – 28 July 2025) was a Brazilian journalist.

== Life and career ==
Beraba was born in Rio de Janeiro on 29 April 1951. He graduated in journalism from the Federal University of Rio de Janeiro. A journalist with some of the biggest newspapers in Brazil, he co-founded the Brazilian Association of Investigative Journalism.

Beraba died from brain cancer in Rio de Janeiro, on 28 July 2025, at the age of 74.
