= Diploma of Journalism =

Academic degree

A Diploma of Journalism (or Diploma in Journalism) is an academic qualification in journalism issued by a university or college.

== Overview ==
The diploma is generally issued after one year of study. As is common with diplomas in general, diplomas in journalism are often more practical or applied than a course leading to a bachelor's or master's degree in journalism. Some universities offer postgraduate Diplomas of Journalism.

Historically, the emergence of journalism diplomas reflected the somewhat condescending view of journalism education which emerged in Britain and British Commonwealth countries, unlike the United States. Briggs and Burke point out that, despite the emergence of university degree programs in the United States from the late 19th century, British universities were uninterested in formal journalism education, and entered the field only at sub-degree level: "between 1919 and 1939 the only University Diploma for Journalism in Britain was offered at London University". In the 1920s and 1930s in Australia, four universities started journalism diploma courses as sub-degree programs, but none of the courses survived in this form. (They have since emerged as degree courses.)

More recently, there has been debate about comparisons between diploma and degree programs in journalism, with advocates of diplomas arguing that the shorter courses, with their lesser emphasis on theory, are often more relevant to industry needs. Degree courses, however, offer deeper theoretical exposure and greater analysis of ethical and legal issues.

In New Zealand, the media industry has developed a national diploma of journalism, establishing a curriculum which is followed by accredited training institutions, including universities and colleges. Britain National Council for the Training of Journalists offers certificate courses and accredits colleges and universities offering diplomas and degrees in journalism.

Another development has been the specialist diploma in a particular field of journalism, such as sports journalism, science journalism or business journalism, generally taught at postgraduate level.

English-language institutions offering the Diploma of Journalism are mainly in the United Kingdom, Ireland, and the Commonwealth countries.

Examples of journalism diploma courses are:

- Cardiff University, Wales
- City University, London
- Concordia University, Canada
- Griffith College Dublin
- Indian Institute of Mass Communication
- Jschool: Journalism Education & Training, Australia
- RMIT University, Australia
- Rhodes University, South Africa
- University of Canterbury, New Zealand
- University of Mysore

== Bibliography ==
- Asa Briggs and Peter Burke, A Social History of the Media: From Gutenberg to the Internet, Wiley, 2005
- Rod Kirkpatrick, Diploma to degree: 75 years of tertiary journalism studies, Australian Studies in Journalism, 1996, no. 5, pp. 256–264
