= CELSA Sorbonne University =

Communication and journalism school

Coordinates: 48.8944°N 2.2747°E

- Type: Public university and Grande Ecole
- Established: 1957
- Director: Pascal Froissart
- Academic staff: 50
- Administrative staff: 50
- Students: 800
- Undergraduates: 150
- Postgraduates: 600
- Location: Neuilly-sur-Seine, France
- Affiliations: Sorbonne University, Conférence des Grandes écoles
- Website: www.celsa.fr

CELSA Sorbonne University, or the École des hautes études en sciences de l'information et de la communication, is a French communication and journalism school (grande école) located in the West of Paris, (Neuilly-sur-Seine) and is part of the Sorbonne University.

The name CELSA is an acronym for the French phrase 'Centre d'études littéraires et scientifiques appliquées', i.e. Centre for Applied Literary and Scientific Studies. Founded in 1957, the school offers students classes in the information and communications sciences and associated professions, along with courses in the humanities and social sciences.

CELSA was ranked the top French school in communication in 2011, 2013 and 2014. Its program in advertising and journalism are also ranked first. The school is highly selective.

Approximately 700 students are enrolled at CELSA to obtain degrees in journalism, corporate communications, intercultural management, marketing and advertising, human resource management, and multimedia studies.

CELSA's faculty is a combination of academics from the Sorbonne University and professionals from a variety of business sectors. Faculty members use a variety of teaching methods including case studies, lectures, discussions, team projects, simulation exercises and independent study.

The school has close connections to companies in France. Its Office of Career Services provides students with a range of professional connections for internships and job opportunities.

The Alumni Association organises monthly meetings and other events and publishes a directory of its 800 members.

== Fields of study ==
=== Journalism ===
Founded in 1979, the journalism section admits students with a three-year post-secondary school qualification. It is one of the most selective and prestigious programmes in journalism in the country. Each year, around 850 candidates apply for admission, though only 25 are offered a place (2006).

It offers a two-year programme accredited by the French journalism profession, which prepares students for all branches of the media and offers no specialisation. It is a highly practical professional course taught mostly by senior journalists from national radio and television stations, daily newspapers and press agencies.

Other practical aspects of the programme include three internships: the first internship is in a local or regional newspaper where students cover local news and publish articles. This gives them practical experience in the workings of a press organisation. The second and third internships take place during the summer break and can be done in any of the media, in France or abroad. There is a professional assignment each year for a media publication or radio station.

As part of their curriculum, students are also required to do coursework to obtain a French 'Master Professionnel' degree in journalism.

CELSA's alumni work for highly regarded French media institutions, such as TF1, France 2, France 3, Canal Plus, France 24, Arte (TV); Le Monde, Le Figaro, Libération (print) or Radio France Internationale, RTL, Europe 1 (radio)...

=== Corporate and institutional communication ===
This is the study of the practices involved in managing and improving the reputation, visibility and image of organisations, and the issues involved in this process. It is the study of the process of explanation of the organisation's strategy to a wide variety of audiences from staff, shareholders and clients to opinion makers such as journalists and elected representatives. It highlights the strategic role of communications in an organisation and offers an understanding of the contexts within which communications campaigns are necessary.

The programme introduces students to all the facets of organisational and institutional communications as well as to the tasks carried out by the different practitioners in this field. It provides thorough training to students in the analytical methods and tools needed to plan and undertake major assignments.

The course prepares students for a wide variety of careers, and requires students with a solid general knowledge and an ability both to sum up situations and offer suitable responses.

=== Marketing, advertising and communication ===
This section trains students who want to become executives in advertising or market research, or who want to specialise in brand management, rather than in pure marketing. It gives students a thorough training in implementing a brand strategy. It teaches students to master the main qualitative and quantitative tools of analysis used in communications.

The curriculum includes a series of courses taught by academic staff in fields such as semiology, thus enhancing students' promotion potential in the marketing sector.

Other lessons are taught by executives from French and international communications agencies and companies, who provide students with practical information on topics ranging from strategic planning to the legal environment, as well as the latest trends in brand management.

=== Human resources management ===
The human resource management section trains students to manage a company's most valuable resource, its people, and to reconcile the organisation's objectives with the needs of employees. The section offers courses in three broad fields. Firstly, an understanding of organisations and their goals. In order to understand the context within which all human resource policies operate, there are lectures on the French and European socio-economic environment. Secondly, the social sciences are taught - sociology, psycho-sociology and employee relations - to broaden students' understanding of the relations between the individual and the group. Finally, the programme introduces students to the more practical aspects of human resource management such as labour law, recruitment, career management, earnings policy and employee communication. The section has recently created an option dealing with the application of information technology to human resource management.

=== Intercultural management and communication ===
The Magistère in communications offers students the widest training in the social sciences, from sociology to ethnology and psycho-sociology. The aim is to enable them to analyse effectively a wide range of behavioural phenomena as well as understand the communications problems and challenges that firms and organisations face today, and to give them the potential to evolve to senior positions quickly. In particular, the program trains students to deal with situations involving cultural and employee diversity, as well as corporate situations with departments having different management cultures.

=== Communication, media, and media transformation ===
The emergence of digital communications has changed the information and communication practices of organisations and firms. This section addresses students interested in the general question of the transformation information undergoes between an institution and its public. The teaching is centred on the analysis, setting-up and management of media systems in the communication strategy of organisations. The first year covers the different theories of information and communication, the history, sociology and economics of the media. The second-year offers an in-depth analysis of different media devices (semiology, media consumption, different styles of writing and reading) and the communication strategies which accompany them. The courses offer a thorough grounding in the entire range of media production (from in-house magazines to institutional web sites) and the vertical production chain within the media. This section trains professionals who will be responsible in the future for media messages in all sectors, from NGOs to public sector bodies, more particularly in digital communications, which predominates at the moment. The students also explore emerging models of communications and new media linked to the internet.

== Student Associations ==
Several associations have been created by CELSA students. They contribute to the school's general atmosphere and to its students' well-being. The Bureau des élèves (Student Bureau) is on the most old one, with a main objective to liven up students' cultural, recreational, sportive, social and humanitarian activities, to favour strong ties between students and to contribute to our students's richness inside and outside the CELSA. Each year several events are organized: a freshers' integration week-end, parties, and a Gala. Another association, JUNIOR COMMUNICATION, is the Junior Achievement group. Junior Communication's programs focus on work readiness, entrepreneurship, and financial literacy, and teach CELSA students important skills to help them become economically empowered. Their missions are suggested to communication agencies looking for such services.
