= Centre for Journalism (University of Southern Denmark) =

The Centre for Journalism (University of Southern Denmark) is a centre within the Department of Political Science and Public Management at the Faculty of Social Sciences, University of Southern Denmark in Denmark. The centre is located in Odense and offers research and education in journalism. Currently the centre has approx. 310 students enrolled in the BA programme and approx. 200 in the MA programmes (status: 2010). Its journalism BA programme is one of the most popular BA programmes offered at the University of Southern Denmark.

Around 35 researchers and lecturers work at the centre. In terms of scientific publications it is the most productive journalism research department in Denmark (status: 2005). The head of centre and studies is professor Peter Bro.

The University of Southern Denmark established its journalism study programme in 1998, as did Roskilde University, following the political decision to break the monopoly of the Danish School of Journalism on journalism education in Denmark. The purpose was to increase the diversity of journalism teaching and research. Since its establishment, the Centre for Journalism has launched several innovative features including a journalist-in-residence fellowship and the introduction of a journalist's oath similar to the Hippocratic oath.

The centre offers study programmes at the undergraduate, graduate and postgraduate.

The centre's highest authority is a board chaired by Per Westergård, editor-in-chief at the daily newspaper Fyens Stiftstidende.

The Centre for Journalism publishes, in collaboration with the Danish School of Journalism and Journalism at Roskilde University, the scientific journal Journalistica. It is a Danish peer-reviewed journal focusing on journalism research.

Students at the Centre for Journalism publish the newspaper Lixen.
