= Chief judge (Australia) =

Highest-ranking judge of a court in Australia

A chief judge (also known as chief justice, presiding judge, president judge or administrative judge) is the highest-ranking or most senior member of a court or tribunal with more than one judge. The chief judge commonly presides over trials and hearings.

In Australia the term Chief Judge can refer to the principal judicial officer of a state District Court, as in New South Wales, or a state County Court, as in Victoria. The former is appointed by the state's Governor, while the latter may be appointed by the state's Attorney-General.
