= Budapest Metropolitan University =

Private university in Budapest, Hungary

Coordinates: 47°30′23″N 19°08′06″E

- Budapesti Metropolitan Egyetem
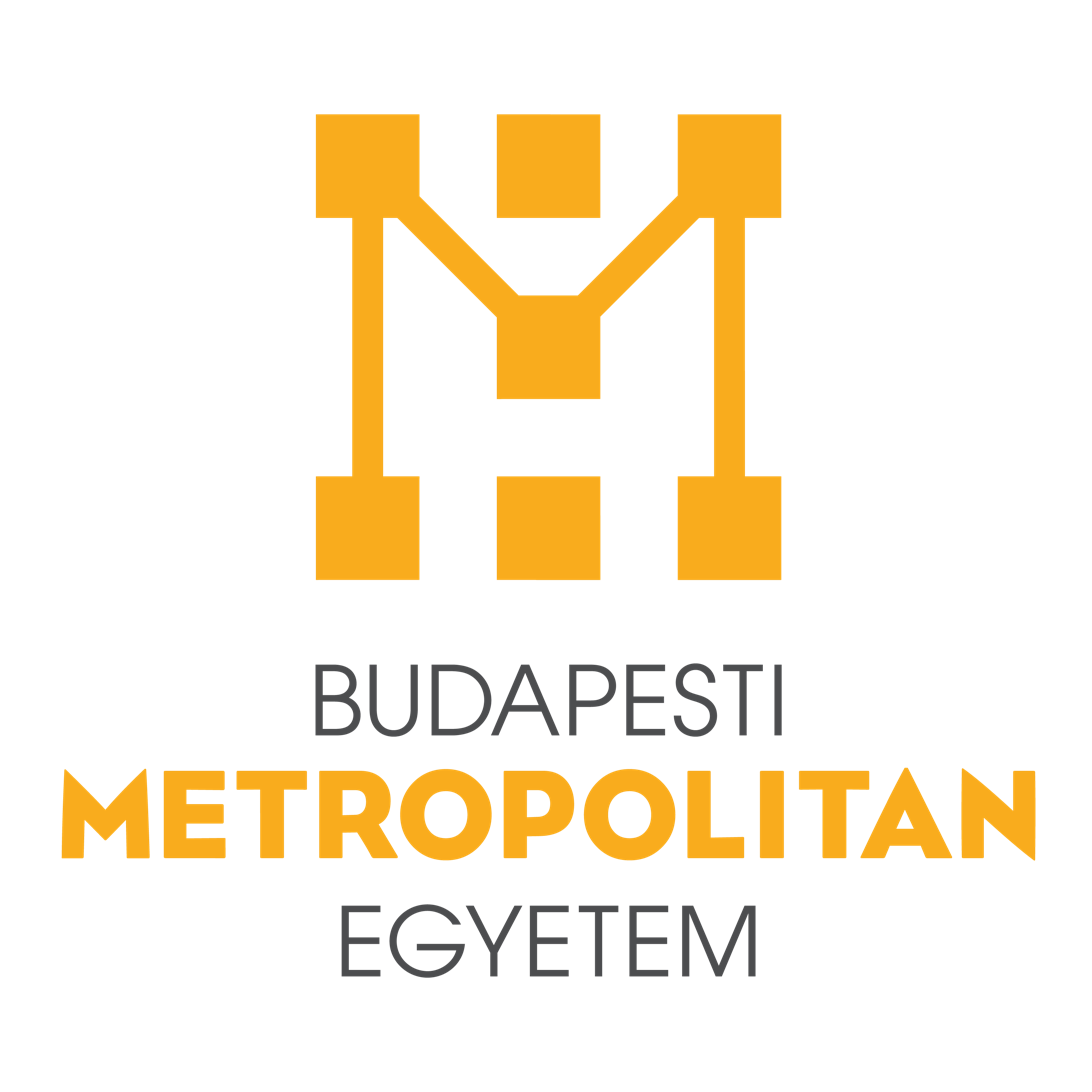
- Motto: Inspired by Creativity
- Type: Private
- Established: 2000
- Students: around 10000
- Location: Budapest, Hungary
- Website: metropolitan.hu

The main buildings of the school

Budapest Metropolitan University (Hungarian: Budapesti Metropolitan Egyetem) is an accredited private institute of higher education in Budapest, Hungary.

As the Budapest College of Communication and Business (Hungarian: Budapesti Kommunikációs és Üzleti Főiskola), it had offered regular and correspondence BA courses in business communication, international communication, a joint degree in communication (journalism) and European public service and business administration between 2001 and 2005. The university was accredited as an adult education institute, as well, in 2003. It has started the training of television journalists in partnership with the Hungarian Public Television. It has its own language department, which functions as an official EURO, ITK-Origo and TOEIC language exam centre and offers regular, business and special language courses. The Trade Academy of BKF offers special courses at intermediate and advanced level. The school’s campus is located in a suburb of Budapest. The school buildings have recently been renovated, and a new building was constructed in 2005 with the support of the European Union. Apart from baccalaureate courses, the school also offers vocational and post graduate courses, company courses in communication, business communication and European public management. The school also has a secondary school (BKF Bilingual Vocational School).

BKF focused on Communication and Media studies, Business, Economics and Marketing, Tourism and Hospitality, and Applied and Media Arts

Budapest Metropolitan University of Applied Sciences had its first graduation ceremony on February 26, 2005, when the school bid farewell in style to the first students of business communication who graduated in January 2005. Since 2005, MET has implemented the Bologna process, and transformed the study programmes by the new Hungarian accreditation requirements. The current, running BA and BSc programmes are communication and media studies, business and management, international business, trade and marketing, tourism, public service.

In 2009, MET integrated the "Heller Farkas" College of Tourism, and established an Institute of Visual Arts with BA programmes in photography, graphics, media design, cameraman, film and media studies - these programmes started in 2010. Besides the main campus, in 2010 the Rózsa Street campus opened its gates for art, tourism and catering students.

== History ==
The university was established in 2000, with state accreditation. Education began a year later with 126 students in the fields of Communication and Business Communication. The first graduation ceremony was held in 2005.

== Degree programs in English ==
=== Bachelor (BA) programs ===
- Animation
- Business Administration and Management
- Commerce and Marketing
- Communication and Media Science
- Craftsmenship
- Film and Media Studies
- Graphic Design
- International Business Economics
- International Relations
- Finance and Accounting
- Media Design
- Photography
- Television Production Arts
- Tourism and Catering

=== Master (MA) programs ===
- Communication and Media Studies
- Management and Leadership
- Tourism Management
