= Jschool =

Independent journalism college in Australia

Jschool is an independent journalism college based in Brisbane, Australia. The college, founded in 2001, admitted its first students in 2002. Jschool is directed and was founded by journalist and educator John Henningham.

== Diploma of Journalism ==
Jschool provides teaching and assessment of the Diploma of Journalism, an accredited one-year tertiary qualification within the Australian Qualifications Framework. The course is vocational in approach, declaring an emphasis on reporting and news writing practice. In 2009 the college received federal government FEE-HELP registration, enabling Australian students to receive student loans. From 2013, Jschool's Diploma of Journalism can be studied online and is also available part-time for online students.

== Ratings and awards ==
The college has been named top journalism school in Australia, based on graduates' ratings.

Students at Jschool have regularly been finalists in the "Most outstanding journalism student" award in the annual Queensland Media Awards (the Clarions), winning the competition in 2010 and 2005.

== Newsbytes ==
Jschool publishes the online newspaper Newsbytes, with news, feature stories and reviews in print and multimedia formats.

== Honorary degrees ==
Jschool has awarded honorary doctor of journalism degrees to distinguished journalists in recognition of their contribution to journalism. Recipients include National Nine political editor Laurie Oakes, national chief correspondent with The Australian newspaper, Hedley Thomas, Australian Broadcasting Corporation radio current affairs journalist Nance Haxton, crime and corruption reporter Bob Bottom, Asia-Pacific Journalism Centre director John Wallace, APN Australian Publishing executive editor Peter Owen, former Courier-Mail editor Greg Chamberlin and editor of Brisbane's Independent newspaper, Don Gordon-Brown.

Included among those given honorary doctorates are two Herald Sun journalists, Gerard McManus and Michael Harvey, in recognition of their courage in upholding the Australian Journalists' Association's code of ethics. (McManus and Harvey were convicted and fined for contempt of court when they refused to reveal confidential sources for their investigative journalism.)
