= Rosental Alves =

Brazilian journalist (born 1952)

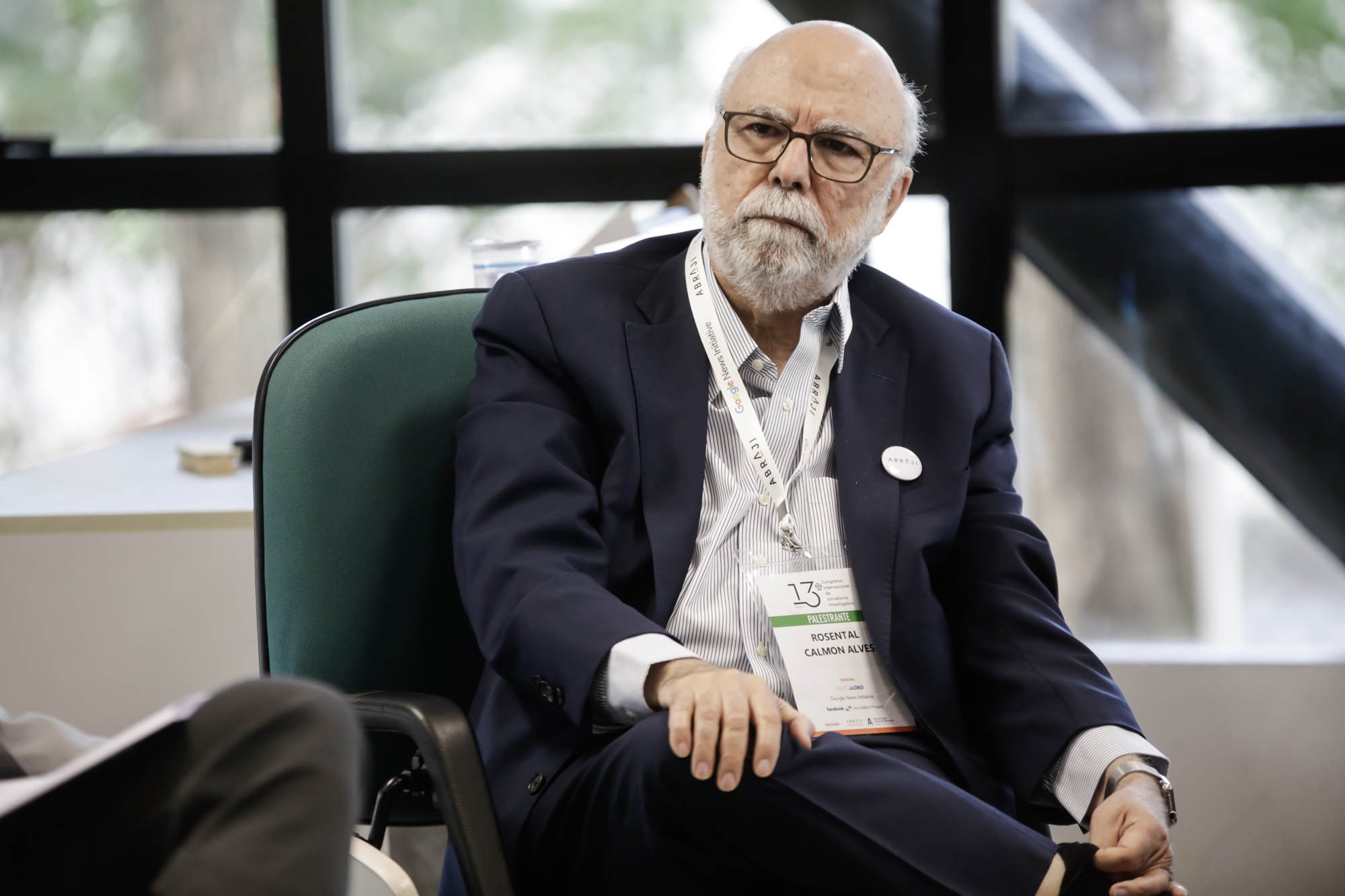
Rosental Calmon Alves in June 2018

Rosental Calmon Alves (born 1952) is a Brazilian journalist.

Alves began his journalism career at the age of sixteen. He studied journalism at the Federal University of Rio de Janeiro. Aged 21, he began lecturing and teaching journalism in Brazil at Fluminense Federal University and at Gama Filho University. Alves wrote for Jornal do Brasil as a foreign correspondent, and managing editor, and helped the publication launch its website in 1994. In 1996, Alves moved to the United States to join the faculty of the University of Texas at Austin as the inaugural Knight Chair in International Journalism. Alves researched the development of journalism education in Latin America.
