= J. Beresford Fowler =

Australian actor and stage director (1893–1972)

Jack Beresford Fowler (21 July 1893 (Note: His army records have his birthdate as 21 June 1893.) – 17 July 1972), generally referred to as Beresford Fowler or J. Beresford Fowler, was an Australian actor and stage director, remembered for his little theatre productions in Melbourne.

== History ==
Fowler was born in Darlinghurst or Ultimo, Sydney, youngest of four sons of musician Frank Harry Fowler (c. 1857 – 9 December 1893) and Fannie Adele Fowler, née Ellard (c. 1861 – 10 August 1928), better known as the actress Ethel Adele, whose sister Ada Kate Ellard married Garnet Walch.

He was only a few months old when his father died, and his mother, though not well provided for, brought up her four boys on her own. In 1896 she took her sons to live in Melbourne, living in various suburbs — Elsternwick, Brighton, Armadale and Hawksburn — taking in boarders and supplementing whatever income by producing Gilbert & Sullivan operettas for high schools. She also appeared on stage for Gregan McMahon, so Jack got to see many stage productions, albeit involuntarily. One of his earliest memories was of Bert Royle's pantomime Djin Djin starring Florrie Young at the Princess Theatre in 1896. He was quite deaf, so had no talents as a singer. He was educated at Hawksburn State School (closed 1993), and after leaving found employment as a dentist's assistant.

Fowler got a start in theatre with Gregan McMahon's amateur company 1911–1914, playing alongside medical student F. Kingsley Norris in various dramas, notably as Foldal in Ibsen's John Gabriel Borkman. On one occasion they shared the stage with Nellie Melba. Other notable amateurs with McMahon around that time were Doris Fitton, Jack Cussen, son of Judge Cussen, and Louie Dunn, teacher of Irene Mitchell.

In 1911 Bert Bailey, Edmund Duggan and Julius Grant combined to form the Bert Bailey Dramatic Company, and leased King's Theatre from William Anderson, and Fowler joined the company. He played Billy Bearup in a touring production of On Our Selection and back at King's Theatre in The Squaw Man on 22 April 1916.

He was living with his mother at 94 Hotham Street, East St Kilda, Victoria when he enlisted with the First AIF in April 1916, and served as a private in France, returning to Australia in 1919. He rejoined Bailey. In 1923 he joined Allan Wilkie's company, playing in Macbeth, A Midsummer Night's Dream, Henry V, and others.

Meanwhile he assembled an independent amateur company, who performed Darnley's comedy Facing the Music from 8 January 1921 at The Playhouse. Audience included members of the 3rd Battalion Pioneers Ibsen's Ghosts followed on 27 September 1922.

He became associated with the Australian Institute of Arts and Literature (1921–1927), a Melbourne club for the Arts élite whose existence rose and fell with the presidency of Sir Robert Garran. A dramatic group was formed within the organisation which, led by Fowler, presented several dramas, one at the clubroom above or adjacent the Palace Theatre overlooking Bourke Street, and another at The Playhouse. The Institute appears not to have sponsored any further productions after 1922.

In 1925, with no backing and £100 from his own savings, Fowler founded The Little Art Theatre Company, often referred to as the Little Art Company or Little Art Theatre. For four years they kept up a heavy schedule of challenging productions, mostly on the minuscule Queen's Hall stage, to generally warm praise from critics. In 1929 they turned professional, with Fowler and Dudley Riddick (who had been with the company several years) as joint directors, and business manager Laurence Walter, as The Art Theatre Players, and that February opened in Hobart. The travelling cast was four men and four women, with Berta Howden pianist. Despite good reviews the tour was a financial failure.

Opened on	Title	Author	Venue	Comments
8 Jul 1922	John Gabriel Borkman	Ibsen	The Playhouse	for I.A.L.
7 Dec 1922	Futurity	Adrian Stephen	Clubrooms	for I.A.L.
16 Sep 1925	A Doll's House	Ibsen	Queen's Hall	
14 Sep 1925	Candida	Shaw	Queen's Hall	
26 Oct 1925	Hedda Gabler	Ibsen	Queen's Hall	
29 Oct 1925	Rutherford and Son	Githa Sowerby	Queen's Hall	
31 Oct 1925	Candida	Shaw	Queen's Hall	
4 Nov 1925	Ghosts	Ibsen	Queen's Hall	
22 Feb 1926	Rutherford and Son	Sowerby	Queen's Hall	"continual improvement"
25 Feb 1926	Hindle Wakes	Stanley Houghton	Queen's Hall	
1 Mar 1926	The Master Builder	Ibsen	Queen's Hall	Melbourne premiere
3 Mar 1926	A Doll's House	Ibsen	Queen's Hall	
6 Mar 1926	Candida	Shaw	Queen's Hall	
11 Mar 1926	Man and Superman	Shaw	The Playhouse	Ruth Conabere was singled out for special praise
18 Mar 1926	The Master Builder	Ibsen	Queen's Hall	
18 May 1926	A Doll's House	Ibsen	The Playhouse	
25 May 1926	Ghosts	Ibsen	The Playhouse	
29 May 1926	The Wild Duck	Ibsen	Queen's Hall	Melbourne premiere
30 May 1926	John Gabriel Borkman	Ibsen	The Playhouse	
17 Jun 1926	Hindle Wakes	Houghton	Queen's Hall	
21 Jun 1926	Hedda Gabler	Ibsen	Queen's Hall	
17 Jul 1926	Man and Superman	Shaw	The Playhouse	
22 Jul 1926	Major Barbara	Shaw	The Playhouse	
21 Nov 1926	The Fires of St. John	Sudermann	Queen's Hall	
6 Jun 1928	Miss Julie	Strindberg	Queen's Hall	Australian premiere
6 Jun 1928	How He Lied to Her Husband	Shaw	Queen's Hall	
16 Dec 1926	Windows (1922 play)	Galsworthy	Queen's Hall	Melbourne premiere
24 Dec 1926	A Doll's House	Ibsen	Queen's Hall	
1 Jan 1927	Caste	T. W. Robertson	Queen's Hall	
15 Jan 1927	Windows	Galsworthy	Queen's Hall	
10 Feb 1927	Fanny's First Play	Shaw	Queen's Hall	
17 Mar 1927	The Seagull	Chekhov	Queen's Hall	
4 Jun 1927	Pygmalion	Shaw	Queen's Hall	
10 Aug 1927	Mrs Warren's Profession	Shaw	Queen's Hall	
5 Sep 1927	The Wild Duck	Ibsen	Queen's Hall	
7 Sep 1927	Windows	Galsworthy	Queen's Hall	
21 Nov 1927	The Fires of St. John	Sudermann	Queen's Hall	
1 Dec 1927	Joy	Galsworthy	Saint Peter's Hall (Note: St Peters Hall, Eastern Hill, Victoria was on the Collins Street tramline, "three or four minutes from the city")	
8 Dec 1927	Major Barbara	Shaw	Saint Peter's Hall	
2 Mar 1928	The Family Man	Galsworthy	Queen's Hall	Melbourne premiere
20 Mar 1928	You Never Can Tell	Shaw	ASH (Note: Allied Society's Hall, Collins Place)	
4 Apr 1928	Candida	Shaw	Queen's Hall	
12 Apr 1928	Dead Timber	Louis Esson	Queen's Hall	
12 Apr 1928	Disturber of Pools	Furnley Maurice	Queen's Hall	on same bill
18 April 1928	Man and Superman	Shaw	Queen's Hall	
5 May 1928	The Taming of the Shrew	Shakespeare	The Playhouse	in modern dress
10 May 1928	The Master Builder	Ibsen	Queen's Hall	
15 May 1928	The Taming of the Shrew	Shakespeare	The Playhouse	
6 June 1928	Miss Julie	Strinberg	Queen's Hall	Australian premiere
20 Jun 1928	Fanny's First Play	Shaw	Queen's Hall	
7 Jul 1928	Rosmersholm	Ibsen	Queen's Hall	
19 Sep 1928	Loyalties	Galsworthy	Queen's Hall	production criticised
8 Oct 1928	Heartbreak House	Shaw	Queen's Hall	Australian premiere
15 Nov 1928	The Whiteheaded Boy	Robinson	Queen's Hall	
22 Nov 1928	E. & O. E.	Eliot Crawshay-Williams	Queen's Hall	"Grand Guignol farce"
22 Nov 1928	The Boon	Chekhov	Queen's Hall	on the same bill
20 Dec 1928	The Vortex	Noël Coward	Queen's Hall	Australian premiere
26 Dec 1928	The Rat Trap	Coward	Queen's Hall	
22 Feb 1929	Pygmalion	Shaw	Queen's Hall	
27 Feb 1929	The Doctor's Dilemma	Shaw	Queen's Hall	Their 41st play
9 March 1929	Windows	Galsworthy	Theatre Royal, Hobart	Debut as a professional company
13 Mar 1929	The Rat Trap	Coward	Theatre Royal, Hobart	
16 Mar 1929	Candida	Shaw	Theatre Royal, Hobart	
21 Mar 1929	The Fires of St. John	Sudermann	Theatre Royal, Hobart	
25 Mar 1929	The Vortex	Coward	Theatre Royal, Hobart	
28 Mar 1929	Pygmalion	Shaw	Theatre Royal, Hobart	with "extras" from the Hobart Repertory Society
8 Apr 1929	Candida	Shaw	National Theatre, Launceston	audience reduced due to floods
10 Apr 1929	Windows	Galsworthy	National Theatre, Launceston	"adequately performed"
22 Apr 1929	Windows	Galsworthy	Queen's Hall	
29 Apr 1929	Candida	Shaw	Queen's Hall	
8 May 1929	The Rat Trap	Coward	Queen's Hall	
22 May 1929	Loyalties	Galsworthy	Queen's Hall	improvement noted
7 Aug 1929	Chains	Elizabeth Baker	Queen's Hall	
14 Aug 1929	Miss Julie	Strindberg	Queen's Hall	
20 Sep 1929	The Pincher Pinched	Furnley Maurice	Queen's Hall	
20 Sep 1929	Peer Gynt (scene)	Ibsen	Queen's Hall	on the same bill
26 Sep 1929	The Round Table	Robinson	Queen's Hall	
31 Oct 1929	Justice	Galsworthy	Queen's Hall	
4 Dec 1929	The Round Table	Robinson	Queen's Hall	
12 Dec 1929	Strife	Galsworthy	Queen's Hall	
4 Jan 1930	Strife	Galsworthy	Queen's Hall	
15 Jan 1930	Justice	Galsworthy	Queen's Hall	
22 Jan 1930	The Vortex	Coward	Queen's Hall	
1 Feb 1930	Heartbreak House	Shaw	Queen's Hall	
19 Feb 1930	Chains	Elizabeth Baker	Queen's Hall	
27 Feb 1930	Fallen Angels	Coward	Queen's Hall	Australian premiere
27 Mar 1930	Passers By	Haddon Chambers	Queen's Hall	Production by Victor Wiltshire
5 Apr 1930	A Doll's House	Ibsen	Queen's Hall	
3 May 1930	Rutherford and Son	Sowerby	Queen's Hall	
7 May 1930	John Gabriel Borkman	Ibsen	Queen's Hall	praised
31 May 1930	Pygmalion	Shaw	Queen's Hall	
4 Jun 1930	Man and Superman	Shaw	Queen's Hall	
11 Jun 1930	Easy Virtue	Coward	Queen's Hall	Australian premiere
23 Jul 1930	Mrs Warren's Profession	Shaw	Queen's Hall	
26 Jul 1930	The Fires of St. John	Sodermann	Queen's Hall	
14 Aug 1930	Widowers' Houses	Shaw	Queen's Hall	Australian premiere
17 Sep 1930	Mrs Warren's Profession	Shaw	Queen's Hall	
29 Sep 1930	The Affairs of Anatol	Schnitzler	Queen's Hall	
22 Jan 1931	The Fugitive	Galsworthy	Queen's Hall	hugely popular
4 Feb 1931	Joy	Galsworthy	Queen's Hall	hugely popular
6 May	Candida	Shaw	Queen's Hall	
20 May	The Rat trap	Coward	Queen's Hall	
27 May	Greater Love	Fowler	Queen's Hall	under the auspices of Sir John Monash and Albert Jacka VC.
22 Jul 1931	A Family Man	Galsworthy	Queen's Hall	
29 Jul 1931	The Wild Duck	Ibsen	Queen's Hall	
28 Oct 1931	Fallen Angels	Coward	Queen's Hall	
1 Nov 1931	The Queen Was in the Parlour	Coward	Queen's Hall	Melbourne premiere
8 Nov 1931	The Pillars of Society	Ibsen	Queen's Hall	Melbourne premiere
6 Jan 1932	Easy Virtue	Coward	Queen's Hall	
13 Jan 1932	The Vortex	Coward	Queen's Hall	
6 Feb 1932	Mesalliance	Shaw	Queen's Hall	
11 Feb 1932	The Queen Was in the Parlour	Coward	Queen's Hall	
18 Feb 1932	The White Blackbird	Robinson	Queen's Hall	
27 Feb 1932	The Wild Duck	Ibsen	Queen's Hall	
5 Mar 1932	Windows	Galsworthy	Queen's Hall	
25 Jan 1933	Home Chat	Coward	Queen's Hall	
26 Jan 1933	Pygmalion	Shaw	Queen's Hall	

=== Other interests ===
He was a prominent member of the Play Lovers' Club, which read Chekhov's The Seagull in August 1926.

Fowler produced plays for other amateur groups, — Sunset by Jerome K. Jerome for the Old Wesley Collegians' Dramatic Society

He produced W. W. Jacobs' The Warming Pan as a radio play on station 3LO in 1930.

He helped found a repertory theatre in Bendigo 1930.

In 1932 he produced plays at Ballarat.

He has been credited as founder and conductor of the Brisbane Liedertafel.

=== As playwright ===
In 1910 Fowler wrote a play about Robert Clive, which he sent to Gerard Coventry, a producer for J. C. Williamson's, which was not accepted, nor was his second, a dramatization of The Count of Monte Cristo. Coventry again returned the manuscript, with the advice to "persevere . . . and never give up or lose heart".

In 1920 he registered his play The Dame of Corbie for copyright purposes.

At an all-Australian programme 12 April 1928 he staged his own A Heroine of Russia (1916)

Greater Love, a "comedy-drama of the war, the stage and school life", loosely adapted from his own novel, The Elusive Ideal.

A Suit of Clothes, play adapted from his own short story.

== Assessments ==
Everyone with a knowledge of the theatre is aware that the producer's skill or the lack of it makes or mars the play. To obtain a right effect at the right moment is part of the producer's job. To obtain a well-balanced ensemble is another . . . How Mr Fowler works his miracles at the Queen's Hall is beyond my comprehension. Almost as well attempt Hamlet in a Punch and Judy theatre.
