= Maurice Byers =

Australian lawyer (1917–1999)

Sir Maurice Hearne Byers CBE, QC
- Born: 10 November 1917; Sydney, Australia
- Died: 17 January 1999 (aged 81); Darlinghurst, Sydney
- Education: University of Sydney
- Occupation: Barrister
- Known for: Australian constitutional law

Sir Maurice Hearne Byers CBE, QC (10 November 1917 – 17 January 1999) was a noted Australian jurist and constitutional expert. He was the Commonwealth Solicitor-General from 1973 to 1983, in which capacity he played a role in the Gair Affair and the 1975 Australian constitutional crisis. He had an unmatched record of success in his appearances before the High Court of Australia, and he has been characterised as the finest lawyer never to have been appointed to the High Court.

== Career ==
Byers was born on 10 November 1917. He was the son of Mabel Florence (née Hearne) and Arthur Tolhurst Byers. His father was a hotel-keeper.

Byers attended St Aloysius' College in Sydney. He studied law at the University of Sydney and was admitted to the Bar in 1944. He practiced initially from University Chambers at 167 Phillip Street, and then later joined 10th Floor Wentworth Chambers along with John Kerr and Gough Whitlam. His practice was mainly in the fields of equity, taxation, company and constitutional law. He appeared frequently before the Judicial Committee of the Privy Council. He became a Queen's Counsel in 1960.

He was President of the New South Wales Bar Association from 1966 to 1967. He was also a Member of the Executive Council of the Law Council of Australia from 1966 to 1968.

In 1973, he was appointed Commonwealth Solicitor-General, serving until 1983. He had an unparalleled success rate when appearing before the High Court in that capacity. He was said to have had "mesmeric powers" over the High Court. On entering the law, his ambition had been to become the best constitutional lawyer in the country. His peers considered he achieved his goal.

=== Gair Affair ===
In April 1974, Byers provided a legal opinion supporting the Whitlam Labor government's argument that Senator Vince Gair had ceased to be eligible to remain a senator from no later than 20 March, the day the Irish government had accepted his appointment as Australian ambassador to Ireland, which is an office of profit under the Crown. The matter was of great interest to the Senate, which for a number of days debated Gair's letter to the Senate President advising that he had ceased to be eligible to be a senator upon his appointment (it was not a letter of resignation as such). The Opposition argued that Gair had participated in debates and votes in the Senate until as late as 2 April, without any objections from the government, and had not tendered his letter to the President until 3 April, by which time the writs for 5 Queensland senators for the forthcoming half-Senate election were already issued. The matter was resolved when Whitlam called a double dissolution instead of a half-Senate election.

== High Court appearances ==
Byers' name is first recorded in the Commonwealth Law Reports as junior to Spender KC in Horsey v Caldwell (1946). Byers appeared regularly in the High Court, including as counsel in the following notable cases:

- Latec Investments Ltd v Hotel Terrigal Pty Ltd (1965) – property law
- Victoria v Commonwealth (1971) – the Payroll Tax Case
- Cormack v Cope (1974) – the Joint Sittings case
- Murphyores Inc Pty Ltd v Commonwealth (1976) – trade and commerce power
- Actors and Announcers Equity Association of Australia v Fontana Films Pty Ltd (1982) – corporations power
- Koowarta v Bjelke-Petersen (1982) – validity of the Racial Discrimination Act 1975
- Commonwealth v Tasmania (1983) – the Tasmanian Dam Case
- Castlemaine Tooheys Ltd v South Australia (1990) – freedom of interstate trade
- Australian Capital Television Pty Ltd v Commonwealth (1992) – implied freedom of political communication
- Kable v Director of Public Prosecutions (NSW) (1996) – institutional integrity principle
- Wik Peoples v Queensland (1996) – native title

== 1975 constitutional crisis ==
Maurice Byers played a role in the 1975 Australian constitutional crisis, which brought his former colleagues Gough Whitlam and (now Sir) John Kerr into conflict in the most dramatic way. Whitlam was now the Labor Prime Minister, and in 1974 he had appointed Kerr Governor-General.

Byers' predecessor as Solicitor-General was Bob Ellicott, who had served under Whitlam but resigned in 1973 to enter politics himself and was now a Liberal Party member of the House of Representatives and a member of the Shadow Cabinet of Opposition Leader Malcolm Fraser. As the crisis caused by the Senate's blocking of Supply deepened, Ellicott issued a legal advice on 16 October 1975, to the effect that the Governor-General had the power to dismiss Whitlam, and should do so forthwith if Whitlam could not state how he would obtain Supply.

Kerr rang Whitlam on 19 October, asking permission to consult with the Chief Justice of the High Court, Sir Garfield Barwick (who was himself a former Liberal politician and Attorney-General, and who happened to be Bob Ellicott's cousin). Whitlam advised Kerr not to consult with Barwick, quoting precedent stretching back over 50 years. On 21 October Kerr requested that the Government provide him with a written legal opinion rebutting Ellicott's opinion. On 22 October Whitlam asked his Attorney-General Kep Enderby to prepare such advice, and he in turn delegated the task to his Solicitor-General, Maurice Byers, who prepared a 6,000-word document. Enderby disagreed with parts of the advice, and when he handed it to Kerr on 6 November, he did so with Byers' name crossed out and his own inserted.

By now Kerr had determined to sack Whitlam if he would not advise an election to break the impasse and guarantee Supply. But he formed the view that Whitlam should be given no hint of his thinking, and he (Kerr) should seek his own counsel. Contrary to Whitlam's express instruction, Kerr met with Barwick and asked him for a written opinion, which was provided on 10 November, and which concurred with Ellicott's view. On 11 November, Kerr dismissed Whitlam's government and commissioned Malcolm Fraser as Prime Minister; it was a condition of Fraser's appointment that he guarantee Supply and immediately advise a general election. Later that day, the Senate granted Supply, an election was called for 13 December, and Parliament was dissolved in a double dissolution.

On 17 November, Maurice Byers' opinion was leaked to The Australian Financial Review, and it acutely embarrassed both Kerr and Barwick. Byers said parts of the Ellicott opinion were "clearly wrong" and said "the mere threat of, or indeed the actual rejection of, Supply neither calls for the ministry to resign nor compels the Crown's representative thereupon to intervene". The leak undermined the justification Kerr had given for his action, and led to him disclosing the advice he had taken from the Chief Justice, contrary to his Prime Minister's instruction.

== Later career ==
Maurice Byers was Leader of the Australian Delegation to the United Nations Commission on International Trade Law in 1974, and then from 1976 to 1982.

He served as a Member of the Australian National University Council from 1975 to 1978.

He was the first chairman of the NSW Police Board from 1983, established by the NSW Labor government when corruption was exposed in the early 1980s.

In 1985 the Hawke government appointed Byers to the Constitutional Commission. He was joined by Professor Enid Campbell; Professor of Law at Monash University; Professor Leslie Zines, former Professor of Law at the Australian National University; Sir Rupert Hamer, former Premier of Victoria; and Gough Whitlam. The commission's report led to four proposals to amend the Constitution, which were put to the people in the 1988 Australian referendum. None of the proposals was carried.

Byers continued to practise law privately. His last two cases before the High Court were the Wik Peoples v Queensland and Kable v Director of Public Prosecutions (NSW) (in which he represented Gregory Wayne Kable, the first man imprisoned in NSW under the Community Protection Act without having been convicted of a crime.)

== Personal life ==
In 1949, Byers married Patricia Davis, a nurse. The couple had three children.

Byers died on 16 January 1999 in Darlinghurst, New South Wales, aged 81. He was interred at the Northern Suburbs Memorial Gardens and Crematorium.

== Honours ==
Maurice Byers was appointed a Commander of the Order of the British Empire (CBE) in the 1978 Queen's Birthday Honours. He was knighted in the 1982 New Year's Honours.

== Legacy ==
In 2000 the New South Wales Bar Association established the Sir Maurice Byers Lecture, to be given by a distinguished jurist on an area of constitutional or public law, in memory of Byers' contribution to these areas.

The Sydney Law School of the University of Sydney offers the Sir Maurice Byers Prize for Proficiency in Constitutional Law.

=== Previous Byers lectures ===
Year	Speaker	Title
2020	Professor Anne Twomey AO	Legal advice in the constitutional maelstrom of the Whitlam era
2019	The Hon Justice Walter Sofronoff	The constitutional significance of the Australian bar
2018	Professor Adrienne Stone	Proportionality in Australian constitutional law
2017	The Hon Chief Justice James Allsop AO	The law as an expression of the whole personality
2016	The Hon Chief Justice Robert French AC	Legal change – the role of advocates
2015	Justin Gleeson SC	The Australian Constitution and international law
2014	The Hon Justice Virginia Bell AC	Appellate review of the facts
2013	The Hon Murray Gleeson AC QC	Finality
2012	Lord Phillips of Worth Matravers KG PC	Dictator or dialogue? The relationship between the Supreme Court of the United Kingdom and the European Court of Justice
2011	The Hon James Spigelman AC QC	Truth and the law
2010	David Bennett AC QC	Rules that ought not to be applied – the ultimate iconoclasm
2009	The Hon Justice Stephen Gageler AC SC	Beyond the text: A vision of the structure and function of the Constitution
2008	Dame Sian Elias GNZM PC QC	Judicial review today
2007	The Hon Dyson Heydon AC QC	Theories of constitutional interpretation: a taxonomy
2006	David Jackson AM QC	The implications of the Constitution
2005	The Hon William Gummow AC QC	Statutes
2004	The Hon Keith Mason AC QC	What is wrong with top-down legal reasoning?
2002	Professor Leslie Zines	Legalism, realism and judicial rhetoric in constitutional law
2001	The Hon Michael McHugh AC QC	Does Chapter III of the Constitution protect substantive as well as procedural rights?
2000	Sir Gerard Brennan AC KBE QC	Strengths and perils: The Bar at the turn of the century
