= Wentworth Chambers =

Australian legal organization

- Formation: 1957
- Type: Barrister's Chambers
- Location: 180 Phillip Street, Sydney

Wentworth Chambers is a barristers' chambers in Sydney, Australia. The chambers was established in 1957 and now comprises 13 sets of autonomous barrister's chambers, the NSW Bar Association and two Supreme Court of New South Wales courts.

== History ==
On 22 April 1952, New South Wales Cabinet approved the purchase of land located at 180 Phillip Street Sydney by the New South Wales Bar Association in order to erect a 13-storey building. The building was intended to house two courts, judges' chambers, barristers' offices, and the staff of the Departments of the Attorney General and of Justice. Under the arrangement, the New South Wales Bar Association was to form a company to acquire the land, with only practicing members of the Bar being entitled to hold shares.

Counsels Chambers Limited was subsequently formed with Sir Garfield Barwick QC as its chairman. The costs of the project were reported to be £750,000.

Wentworth Chambers was officially opened on 20 August 1957. The 15-storey building was named after William Charles Wentworth. Adjoining Wentworth Chambers at 174 Phillip Street stands Selborne Chambers which was occupied by barristers from October 1963. The Selborne Chambers stands at a site of the building erected in 1883 and then named “Selborne Chambers” in honour of Roundell Palmer, 1st Earl of Selborne who as Lord Chancellor.

Signifying its connection with the English Bar, Wentworth Chambers was gifted with relics and replica arms of the four English Inns of Court – Lincoln's Inn, Inner Temple, Middle Temple and Gray's Inn. Wentworth Chambers has been continually occupied by barristers since 1957, including those subsequently appointed as Justices of the High Court of Australia, Federal Court of Australia and Supreme Court of New South Wales.

Members of Wentworth Chambers have included Garfield Barwick KC, Gordon Wallace QC, Nigel Bowen QC, John Kerr QC, John Holmes QC, Maurice Byers QC, Tom Hughes QC, Roddy Meagher QC, Michael McHugh QC, Murray Gleeson QC, David Bennett QC, Ruth McColl SC, Bret Walker SC, Ian Harrison SC, Michael Slattery QC, and Tom Bathurst QC.

== Present ==
Today Wentworth Chambers comprises 13 sets of autonomous barrister's chambers, some of which have joined with chambers in the adjoining Selborne Chambers building.

Level 1 of the chambers is occupied by the Supreme Court of New South Wales and contains two Court Rooms and Judge's Chambers. The NSW Bar Association and the Library for the NSW Bar Association continue to occupy the lowest 2 levels of the building.

The building continues to be owned by practising barristers through Counsel's Chambers Limited.
