= Garran (surname) =

Garran is a surname. Notable people with the surname include:

- Andrew Garran (1825–1901), English-Australian journalist and politician
- Gabriel Garran (1929–2022), French actor and theatre director
- Robert Garran (1867–1957), Australian lawyer
