= Australian Institute of Arts and Literature =

The Australian Institute of Arts and Literature was a club for culture lovers that flourished in the 1920s in Melbourne, Australia.

== History ==
The institute grew out of a suggestion by Edward A. Vidler, journalist and author of The Rose of Ravenna, for the creation of a club to foster fellowship within the arts community, suggesting exactly that title, reminiscent of the National Institute of Arts and Letters (founded 1912) in America. It was followed by a public meeting at Furlong's rooms on 17 February 1921 and formation of the club with about 60 members.

They acquired clubrooms in Palace Chambers, attached to the Palace Theatre at the top of Bourke Street, Melbourne, and met there weekly; a programme was arranged for each meeting, perhaps a lecture on art or a musical performance. An amateur dramatic company was formed from its membership, led by Beresford Fowler and played Adrian Consett Stephen's Futurity and Ibsen's John Gabriel Borkman; due to space constraints the latter was staged at The Playhouse.

The club gained significantly in status and membership numbers when Sir Robert Garran became president. Thanks to his and Lady Garran's involvement, visiting artists of repute were entertained there, and the meetings became crowded affairs, not only with members and their partners but associate members and guests. The Melbourne Literary Club and its magazine, Birth (edited by Furnley Maurice) merged with the institute.

In 1927 Garran was transferred to Canberra and the Institute felt his loss keenly, and never recovered. The Institute continued until at least 1930.
