= Ruth Higgins =

Australian barrister and solicitor-general designate

Ruth Higgins SC FAAL

Solicitor-General of Australia
- Incumbent
- Assumed office 8 June 2026
- Appointed by: Sam Mostyn
- Preceded by: Stephen Donaghue

Personal details
- Born: Scotland
- Education: University of Glasgow (LLB(Hons I)); Balliol College, Oxford (DPhil)
- Occupation: Barrister

Ruth Higgins is an Australian barrister serving as the twelfth Solicitor-General of Australia.

== Education and private practice ==
Higgins was born in Scotland, and named L.A. Law as one of her inspirations to pursue a legal career. She studied at the University of Glasgow, completing a Bachelor of Laws with first-class honours and a Diploma of Legal Practice. Higgins later completed a doctor of philosophy in law at Balliol College, Oxford. Before practicing as a barrister, she worked at Gilbert + Tobin. She was called to the New South Wales bar in 2006 and was appointed Senior Counsel in 2017. Before her nomination as solicitor-general she was a member of Banco Chambers, and had served a term as president of the New South Wales Bar Association.

=== Noted matters ===
Higgins has been noted for representing the Commonwealth Bank during the Royal Commission into Misconduct in the Banking, Superannuation and Financial Services Industry, Woolworths during the 2024–25 Australian Competition and Consumer Commission supermarkets inquiry, and the Australian Securities and Investments Commission in its proceedings against Star Entertainment Group. She acted for the Human Rights Law Centre and the Kaldor Centre in NZYQ v Minister for Immigration, which overturned Al Kateb v Godwin. Higgins also acted for Epic Games in its dispute against Google and Apple in the Federal Court of Australia.

== Solicitor-General ==
Higgins was nominated to serve as solicitor-general on 6 April 2026 by the Albanese government, and began her term on 8 June 2026. Higgins is the first woman to serve in the role.

== Bibliography ==
- Higgins, Ruth C. A. (6 May 2004). The Moral Limits of Law: Obedience, Respect, and Legitimacy. Oxford University Press. doi:10.1093/acprof:oso/9780199265671.001.0001. ISBN 9780199265671. LCCN 2004010231.

Government offices
Preceded by Stephen Donaghue	Solicitor-General of Australia; 2026–present	Succeeded by incumbent
