= Gilbert + Tobin =

Australian commercial law firm

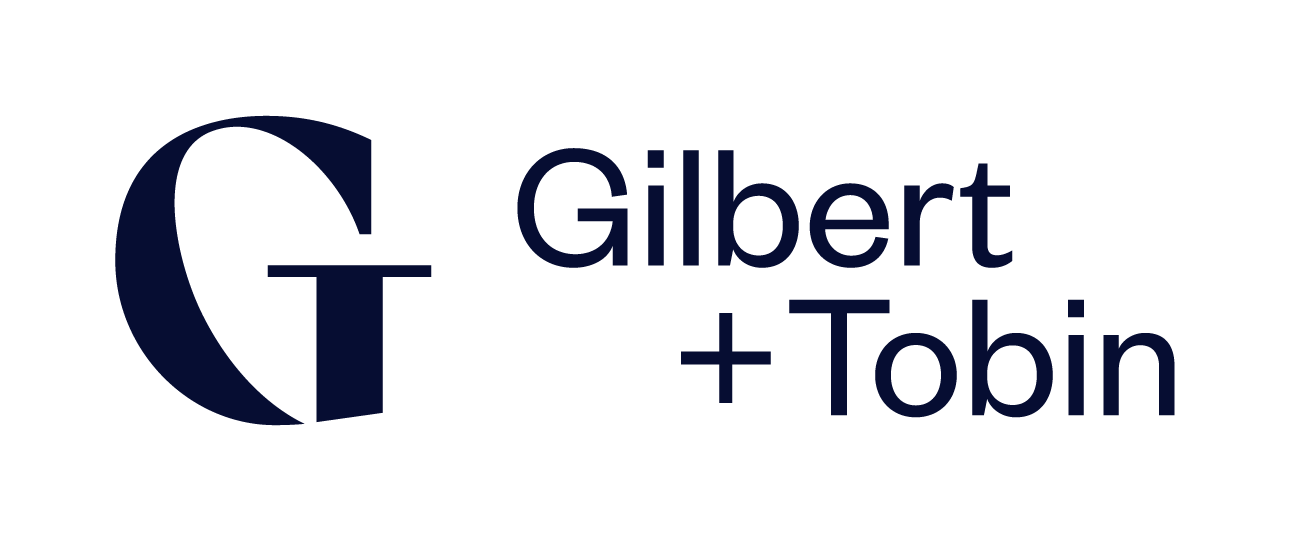
- Headquarters: Sydney, Australia
- Offices: Sydney, Melbourne, Perth
- No. of attorneys: 500+ lawyers
- No. of employees: 1000+ employees
- Major practice areas: Artificial Intelligence, Banking and Finance, Corporate Advisory, Competition Consumer and Market Regulation, Climate Change and Sustainability, Disputes and Investigations, Intellectual Property, Pro Bono, Real Estate, and Technology and Digital.
- Key people: Danny Gilbert (Chairman); Sam Nickless (CEO)
- Date founded: 1988
- Company type: Partnership
- Website: www.gtlaw.com.au

Gilbert + Tobin is a commercial law firm in Australia with more than 118 partners and 1,100 employees working across its Sydney, Melbourne and Perth offices. The firm specialises in transactions, disputes and regulation.

== History ==
The firm has grown significantly since its founding in 1988 to become a top tier law firm in Australia.

In 2025, the pro bono team includes two partners and four lawyers who are solely dedicated to pro bono matters.

In 2001, the Gilbert + Tobin Centre of Public Law was founded at the University of New South Wales in Sydney. It functions as a research centre specialising in constitutional and administrative law, Indigenous legal issues and human rights.

In 2022, Danny Gilbert stepped down from Managing Partner after 33 years. Sam Nickless became Chief Executive Officer. Danny remains with the firm and focuses on partner engagement, culture and future strategy.

In 2023, Gilbert + Tobin advocated for the voice referendum to alter the Constitution to recognise Aboriginal and Torres Strait Islander peoples as the First Peoples of Australia and establish a Voice to Parliament. Danny Gilbert was co-chair of Yes23 and is currently Co-Chair and Director of Australians for Indigenous Constitutional Recognition.

== Pro bono and community engagement ==
=== Pro bono practice ===
Gilbert + Tobin has maintained a dedicated pro bono practice since 1996 and was the first Australian law firm to appoint a full-time in-house pro bono lawyer. The practice focuses on providing legal assistance in matters involving First Nations peoples, people with disability, refugees and asylum seekers, and human rights. The firm is a founding signatory to the Australian Pro Bono Centre's National Pro Bono Target.

=== Sustainability ===
Gilbert + Tobin has undertaken environmental sustainability initiatives since the late 2010s. In 2018, the firm announced it had become carbon neutral across its Australian offices, and in 2019 it became the second Australian law firm to achieve certification under the Australian Government's National Carbon Offset Standard (now Climate Active). The firm subsequently began reporting its greenhouse gas emissions through CDP and has been recognised through the CitySwitch program for initiatives to reduce emissions and transition to renewable electricity.

=== Diversity and inclusion ===
Gilbert + Tobin is a founding signatory to the Law Council of Australia's Equitable Briefing Policy and has been recognised by the Workplace Gender Equality Agency as an Employer of Choice for Gender Equality.

== Notable cases and transactions ==
- Mayne Pharma in Mayne Pharma Group Limited [2025] NSWSC 1204.
- Eucalyptus on its USD1.15 billion acquisition by NYSE-listed Hims & Hers Health, Inc.
- Virgin Australia Holdings on its $2.3 billion initial public offering and return to the ASX.
- Guzman y Gomez on its $2.2bn IPO and ASX listing.
- Sigma Healthcare on its merger with Chemist Warehouse, creating a leading ASX-listed wholesaler, distributor and retail pharmacy franchisor with a market cap of more than $30 billion.
- Partner Richard Harris advised on the Royal Commission into Misconduct in the Banking, Superannuation and Financial Services Industry in 2018.
- Partners Andrew Floro, Kate Harrison and Anne Cregan advised on the Royal Commission into the Protection and Detention of Children in the Northern Territory in 2016.

== Alumni ==
- Sam Mostyn, Governor-General of Australia
- Gina Cass-Gottlieb, Chair of the Australian Competition & Consumer Commission
- Ruth Higgins, Solicitor-General of Australia
- Michelle Rowland, Attorney-General of Australia
