= Frank Kingsley Norris =

Australian military officer and physician

Sir Frank Kingsley Norris
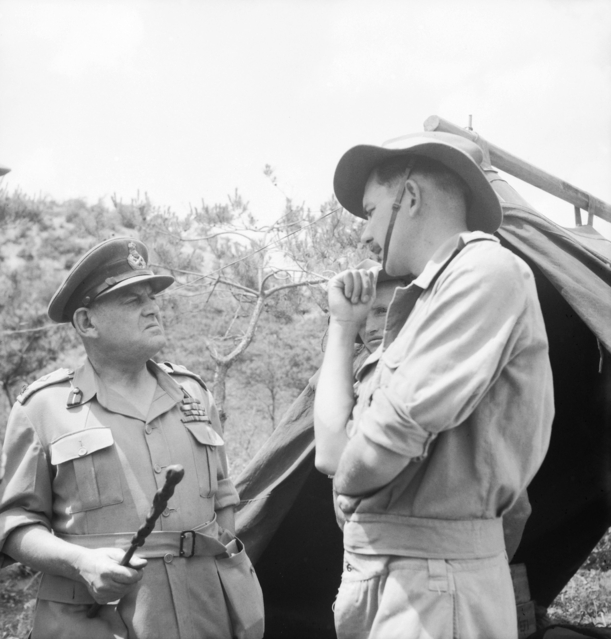
- Major General Frank Kingsley Norris (left). Korea, 1951.
- Born: 25 June 1893; Lilydale, Victoria
- Died: 1 May 1984 (aged 90); Camberwell, Victoria
- Burial place: Box Hill Cemetery
- Military career
- Allegiance: Australia
- Branch: Australian Army
- Service years: 1914–1916; 1923–1955
- Rank: Major General
- Commands: Director-General of Army Medical Services (1948–55)
- Conflicts: First World War; Second World War; Syria–Lebanon Campaign; New Guinea campaign
- Awards: Knight Commander of the Order of the British Empire; Companion of the Order of the Bath; Distinguished Service Order; Commander of the Order of St John; Efficiency Decoration

Major General Sir Frank Kingsley Norris, KBE, CB, DSO, ED (25 June 1893 – 1 May 1984), commonly referred to as F. Kingsley Norris, was an Australian military officer and physician. Norris served in both the First World War and Second World War.

== Early life and education ==
Norris was born in Lilydale, Victoria to William Perrin Norris, a medical doctor, and his wife Mary Jane née Foulkes. He attended school at the Melbourne Church of England Grammar School. He had a strong histrionic bent, playing in Gregan McMahon's troupe, on one occasion alongside J. Beresford Fowler in Ibsen's John Gabriel Borkman, sharing the stage with Nellie Melba.

Norris entered Trinity College at the University of Melbourne in 1913 while studying medicine, graduated in 1916 with a Bachelor of Medicine, Bachelor of Surgery (MBBS), before becoming a Doctor of Medicine (MD) four years later.

== Military service ==
While studying at university, Norris enlisted in the Australian Imperial Force (AIF). He served in Europe and the Middle East as a medical orderly. He was discharged so that he could complete his studies.

In 1923 Norris joined the Citizen Military Forces (CMF), a forerunner to the Australian Army Reserve.

On the outbreak of the Second World War, Norris transferred from the CMF to the Second Australian Imperial Force. By the end of 1940 he had been posted to the Middle East, spending time in Syria.

While serving in Papua, he became the first senior Australian officer to cross the Owen Stanley Range on foot.

In 1948 Norris was appointed Director-General of Army Medical Services, with the rank of temporary major general.

== Honours ==
In 1941 Norris was made a Companion of the Distinguished Service Order (DSO). In 1943 he was made a Commander of the Order of the British Empire (CBE). Norris was made an Officer of the Order of Saint John in January 1952. Later in the same year, Norris was made a Companion of the Order of the Bath (CB). In January 1957, Norris became a Commander of the Order of Saint John.

He was made a Knight Commander of the Order of the British Empire in 1957 for services to medicine.

Military offices
Preceded by Major General Roy Burston	Director General of Medical Services; 1948–1955	Succeeded by Major General Sir William Refshauge
