= List of honorary fellows of Exeter College, Oxford =

This is a list of Honorary Fellows of Exeter College, Oxford. A list of current honorary fellows is published on the college's website at List of Honorary Fellows.

- Sir Martin Amis
- Sir Ronald Arculus
- Sir John Ashworth
- Pierre Audi
- Sir Roger Bannister
- Alan Bennett
- Andrew Blake
- Alfred Blunt
- Alfred Brendel
- Sydney Brenner
- Sir Richard Buxton
- Dame Frances Cairncross
- Reeta Chakrabarti
- Dick Celeste
- Geoffrey Cheshire
- Sir Ronald Cohen
- John Coleridge, 1st Baron Coleridge
- Sir Rory Collins
- Sir Ivor Crewe
- Thomas Cromwell
- Salvador de Madariaga
- John Drury
- Jo Dunkley
- Sir John Eccles
- Edmund Davies, Baron Edmund-Davies
- Carolyn Evans
- Adam Falk
- Lewis Richard Farnell
- David Feldman
- Polly Findlay
- Antony Galione
- Timothy Garton Ash
- Guy Goodwin
- Sir James Gowans
- Stephen Green, Baron Green of Hurstpierpoint
- Gillian Griffiths
- Jonathan Hall
- Kenneth Hayne
- Sir Cyril Hinshelwood
- Bart Holaday
- Mark Houghton-Berry
- Philip Seaforth James
- Sir Sydney Kentridge
- Pedro Pablo Kuczynski
- John Kufuor
- Sir John Laws
- John Leighfield
- Anthony Low
- Sir Colin Maiden
- Richard Mahoney
- Maud Mandel
- Helen Marten
- James Kelsey McConica
- Richard Meddings
- Jane Mellor
- Stephen Merrett
- Kenneth Mwenda
- Vikram Nehru
- Sir David Norgrove
- Joseph Nye
- Charles Outhwaite
- Sir Antonio Pappano
- Anant Parekh
- Christopher Peacocke
- Sir Philip Pullman
- John Quelch
- H. J. Rose
- J.K. Rowling
- Morton O. Schapiro
- Sir Richard Shireiff
- Queen Sofía of Spain
- Sir Richard Southern
- Clare Stanford
- Sir Kenneth Stowe
- Surya Subedi
- Peter Thompson
- Stansfield Turner
- Graham Ward
- Sir David Warren
- Charlotte Watts
- Sir Kenneth Wheare
- David Williamson, Baron Williamson of Horton
