= Carolyn Evans =

Griffith University Vice Chancellor

Carolyn Evans FASSA
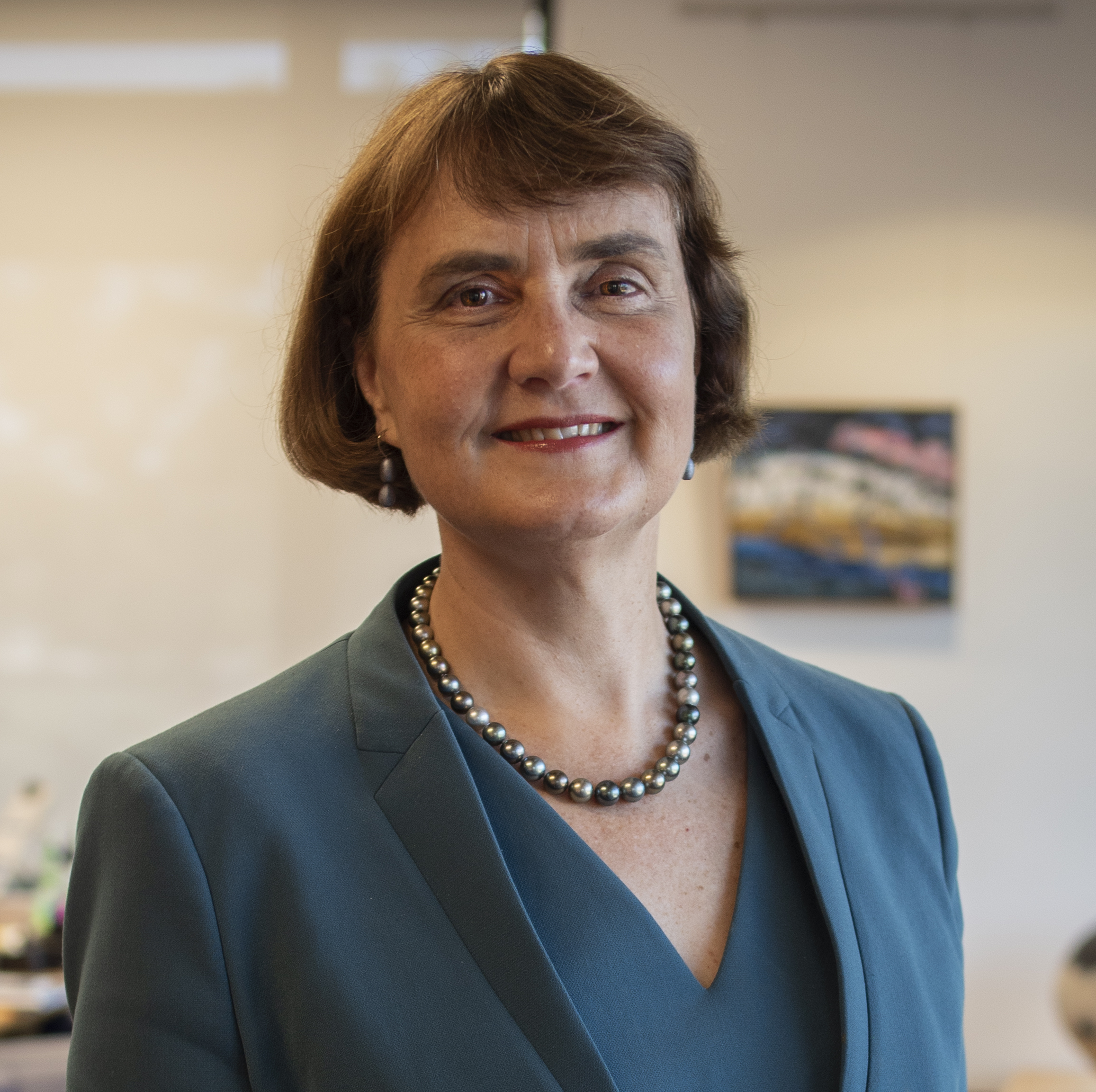
- Professor Evans in 2021

Vice Chancellor of the University of Melbourne
- Incumbent
- Assumed office 5 October 2026
- Preceded by: Glyn Davis (acting)

Personal details
- Born: Carolyn Maree Evans; 1970 (age 55–56) Melbourne, Australia
- Spouse: Stephen Donaghue
- Education: University of Melbourne (BA, LLB); Exeter College, Oxford (PhD)

Carolyn Maree Evans FASSA (born 1970 in Melbourne) is an Australian academic administrator. She is currently the vice-chancellor of University of Melbourne.

== Academic career ==
Following the completion of her doctorate in 1999, Evans was appointed a stipendiary lecturer in law at Exeter College, Oxford. After the two year post ended, she returned to Australia where she joined the academic staff of Melbourne Law School.

Evans has held several senior academic positions including Dean and Harrison Moore Professor of Law at the University of Melbourne Law School and deputy vice-chancellor and deputy provost at the University of Melbourne.

In February 2019, Evans was appointed vice-chancellor and president of Griffith University, becoming the first woman to hold that position.

She became President of the Australian Higher Education Industrial Association in 2021 and chaired the Innovative Research Universities (IRU) from 2021 to 2022. She was a board member of Open Universities Australia from 2019 to 2023, and is currently a board member of Universities Australia.

Evans is a director of the Committee for Economic Development of Australia (CEDA), and has been chair of the State Advisory Committee since 2023.

In April 2026 The University of Melbourne announced the appointment of Evans as their 22nd Vice-Chancellor, commencing in October 2026.

== Honours ==
Evans was elected as a Fellow of the Academy of Social Sciences in Australia in 2019 and named an Honorary Fellow of Exeter College, Oxford in 2023.

== Publications ==
=== Books ===
- "Freedom of Religion under the European Convention on Human Rights" Oxford University Press (April 19, 2001)
- "Legal Protection of Religious Freedom in Australia" (Federation Press, 2012).

Co-author

- "Australian Bills of Rights: The Law of the Victorian Charter and the ACT Human Rights Act" (LexisNexis, 2008)
- "Open Minds: Academic Freedom and Freedom of Speech in Australia" (Black Inc., 2021).

== Personal life ==
Evans is married to Stephen Donaghue, a judge in the Court of Appeal in Victoria and previously the Australian Solicitor-General, and has two children.

Evans was born in Melbourne in 1970 and grew up in Greensborough, Victoria. Her father, Terry, was a printer, and her mother, Tess, was a primary school teacher and later a novelist. She has two younger brothers, Tim and Julian."Evans, Carolyn". The Australian Women's Register.
