= Palace Theatre, Melbourne =

Theatre and music venue in Melbourne, Victoria, Australia

Coordinates: 37°48′41″S 144°58′20″E

Palace Theatre

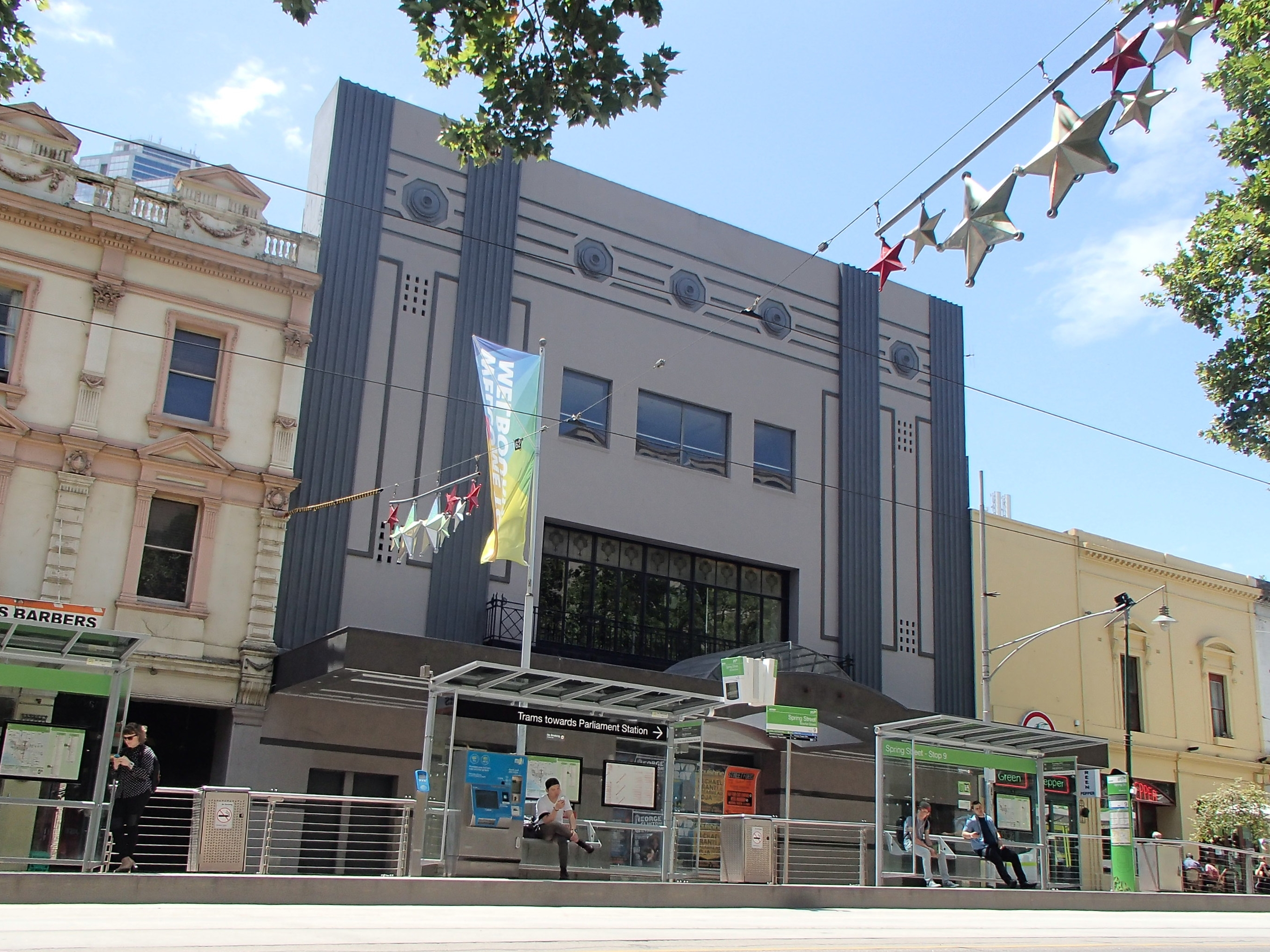
- Interactive map of Palace Theatre
- Former names: Metro Nightclub; Palace Theatre; Metro Theatre; St James Theatre; Apollo Theatre; Brennan's Amphitheatre
- Location: 20-30 Bourke Street, Melbourne, Australia
- Capacity: 1,855

Construction
- Opened: April 1912
- Closed: May 2014

The Palace Theatre (also known as The Palace) was an entertainment venue located in Melbourne, Australia. First built for live theatre in 1912, it was also used as a cinema and for live music. It was demolished except for its facade in 2020 after much community opposition, to be replaced by a Le Méridien hotel.

== History ==
The Palace site had a rich history of entertainment uses through many many different incarnations over the decades 1912-2010s. Although altered many times, its superabundance of contributions to Melbourne's theatrical heritage made it worthy of preservation, arguments which unfortunately did not prevent its destruction.

=== Excelsior Hotel ===
A view of the Excelsior Hotel on Bourke Street in 1861

The plot of land on 20-30 Bourke Street was occupied from the late 1850s Excelsior Hotel. The association between hotels and entertainments at the time was close, and the hotel incorporated a large room used for meetings, banquets and other entertainment including boxing and wrestling. The hotel later became known as Stutt's Hotel circa 1875, and then the Hotel Douglas in 1900. The last listing for the Hotel Douglas in the Sands Directory was in 1911. The hotel was sold in February that year for £32,000.

=== Theatre ===
Brennan's Amphitheatre in 1912

In 1911 the Queensland based architects Eaton & Bates, in association with the Melbourne architect Nahum Barnet, were commissioned to design a new theatre for the site for James Brennan. The design had seating on three levels and a large proscenium with curtains of gold. The front section included some rooms on the upper floors known as the Pastoral Hotel. It opened in April 1912 as Brennans Amphitheater.

In 1916 the Sydney architect Henry Eli White designed alterations, which involved a complete refitting of the auditorium and lobby with the addition of ornate plaster decoration in a Louis XVI style, and it was renamed the Palace Theatre. Between 1919 and c. 1922 a front room on the upper level was let for use as a studio to the prominent artists Arthur Streeton and Max Meldrum. "Palace Chambers", which was similarly located and perhaps the same space, was used by the Institute of Arts and Literature between 1921 and 1927.

In 1923 the auditorium was extensively remodelled, though retaining the Louis Seize style, overlaid with Adamesque decoration, and it was re-opened as The New Palace.

=== Cinema ===
In 1934 further alterations were carried out and renamed the Apollo Theatre, but only six years later in 1940 the building was renamed the St James. In 1951 it was purchased by MGM, was renamed the 'St James Theatre & Metro', featuring films exclusively from its owners. The facade was substantially remodelled in an Art Deco style designed by H Vivian Taylor, the only part which still remains today. Internally the proscenium was replaced and the side boxes and the balcony ends were removed to allow installation of a CinemaScope screen. The last film to be shown at the MGM cinema was Kelly's Heroes, starring Clint Eastwood in October 1970. After this it was sold.

=== Theatre ===
The cinema was reopened as a theatre in 1971. It featured a 39-week season of the musical Hair from 1971 to 1972. The life of the theatre was short-lived, as in 1974 it was converted back into a cinema and renamed the Palace Theatre for the first time since 1916.

=== Church ===
In 1980 the theatre was sold to the Melbourne Revival Centre, a Pentecostal church headquartered in Melbourne. It became a major venue for their services, which involved theatre productions.

=== Night Club ===
The Metro Nightclub in 2004

The next sale resulted in a major refurbishment by the Melbourne architectural firm Biltmoderne, transforming it into the Metro Nightclub in 1987. The Metro was described in 2006 as having a "classy, intimate VIP lounge in Gods Bar along with the funky Fish Bowl on the mezzanine level providing electrifying views of the Main Room below, all available for your partying pleasure."

=== Music venue ===
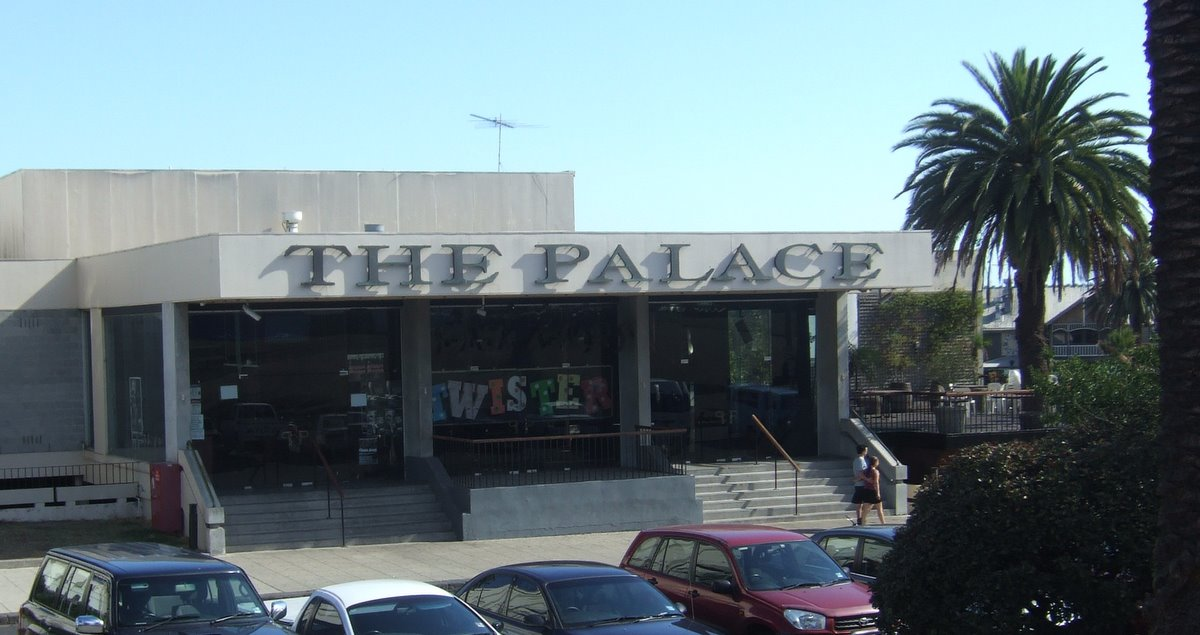
The old Palace in St Kilda, shortly before closure in 2007.

In 2007 the Metro nightclub was sold. The new owners, who operated the former Palace, St Kilda, lost an acrimonious 2-year battle with the State Government over the lease of the old building and moved their business to the Metro. They undertook works to convert the Metro into a live music venue, and changed its name to The Palace. The old Palace in St Kilda burned down only a few months later under suspicious circumstances.

Over the next seven years it became a very well established venue, hosting acts such as George Clinton, The Black Keys, Queens of the Stone Age, Arctic Monkeys and The Killers, to name a few. It had a capacity of 1850.

=== Closure, controversy and demolition ===
The 2013 hotel design.

In late 2012 The Palace was sold to a China-based developer Jinshan Investment Group for $11.2 million. In mid 2013 the new owners revealed plans for a major 30-storey W Hotel development replacing the theatre, worth $180 million. These plans generated considerable opposition, especially from Melbourne's music community. The City of Melbourne also opposed the plans since it was far in excess of the height limit on the site. The plans were then modified into a smaller 7-storey hotel. The theatre was then closed in April 2014.

Save the Palace campaigners outside the former theatre

In late 2014, while the City of Melbourne was considering heritage protection of the interior (which would have been the first interior listed by them), a skip in a rear lane was discovered full of broken pieces of the interior decorative plaster and tiles, and jackhammering sounds were coming from inside. Activists claimed that owners Jinshan Investments were deliberately destroying the interior features to prevent any heritage listing.

In response, Jinshan representatives stated that "over the past 100 years [The Palace] has been dramatically altered, with much of its original features and history stripped by previous owners, including the Metro Nightclub which added steel staircases and galleries that dramatically transformed the interior in the 1980s."

The subsequent recommendation to Council was that not enough remained to justify listing the interior.

The City of Melbourne nevertheless refused to issue a permit for the hotel, a decision that the owners appealed to the Victorian Civil and Administrative Tribunal (VCAT) in early 2016. However, the decision handed down a few months later was to allow demolition and redevelopment works to go ahead. The site lay idle for some time until late February 2020 when internal demolition works began, leaving only the external walls. The new hotel, a Le Meridien, opened in March 2023.

== In popular culture ==
In 1956, the Palace Theatre helped to inspire an enduring Olympic tradition, when a teenager named John Ian Wing wrote a letter to the organisers of the Melbourne Olympics, suggesting that the Closing Ceremony feature the athletes of all nations entering the stadium as an intermingled group. The idea was adopted, and helped to redeem the Melbourne Games' reputation as the 'Friendly Games'. Wing has since written that his idea was inspired by his observation of the jumbled and spirited crowds exiting the Palace Theatre, visible from his home above a Bourke Street restaurant.

In 1976, cover band The Blue Echoes used a photograph of Bourke Street for the album cover for their album 'Dancing in the Street'. The Palace can clearly been seen on the photograph.
