= Willoughby Girls High School =

Willoughby Girls' High School

Location
- Willoughby, New South Wales; Australia; 33°48′10″S 151°11′57″E

Information
- Type: Public, single-sex, secondary, day school
- Motto: Courage, Truth and Loyalty
- Established: 1934
- Principal: Adrienne Scalese
- Enrolment: ~931 (7–12)
- Campus: Suburban
- Colours: White and navy/royal blue
- Feeder schools: Willoughby Public School Northbridge Public School
- Website: https://willoughbg-h.schools.nsw.gov.au

Willoughby Girls' High School (WGHS) is a public, secondary, day school for girls, located in Willoughby, a lower North Shore suburb of Sydney, New South Wales, Australia.

Established in 1934, Willoughby Girls' High currently enrols around a thousand students from Years 7 to 12, and is the only comprehensive government girls' school situated on the lower north shore of Sydney.

== Facilities and activities ==
Willoughby Girls High School has a variety of facilities for students, including, a playing field, library, senior study rooms, canteen, science labs, computer labs, design and technology and textile rooms, music studio, art rooms, and landscaped courtyards. The school has also been providing extension classes for the last nine years in Maths, English and Science for those girls with higher marks, who are selected to this class in year 7 through a series of tests, and every subsequent year through their course marks. The school also puts on a musical every 2 years.

=== Extra curricular activities ===
- Music ensembles: chamber ensemble, senior wind ensemble, junior wind ensemble, percussion ensemble, accelerate ensemble, junior choir, senior choir, jazz ensemble
- Social justice committee
- Secret Environmental Society
- Debating
- Mock trials
- Theatre Sports
- Drama club (year 7 and 8)
- Film club
- The Duke of Edinburgh's Award
- P&C sports: netball, basketball, (indoor and outdoor) hockey, touch footy
- Chess club
- Dance
- Philosophy club
- French film club
- Anime and Manga club
- SRC

== Alumni ==
- Evonne Goolagong (born 1951), tennis player.
- Jeni Mawter (born 1959), children's author.
- Yvonne Kenny (born 1950), opera singer.
- Jo Haylen, New South Wales Member of Parliament for the seat of Summer Hill for the Australian Labor Party, elected 2015.
- Justice Ruth McColl AO, Court of Appeal, Supreme Court of New South Wales
- June Dally-Watkins (1927–2020), model, entrepreneur, founder of chain of deportment schools
- Tania Verstak (born 1942), crowned Miss Australia and Miss International 1962

== See also ==
- List of government schools in New South Wales
