= Robert Garran =

First Solicitor-General of Australia

Sir Robert Garran GCMG QC
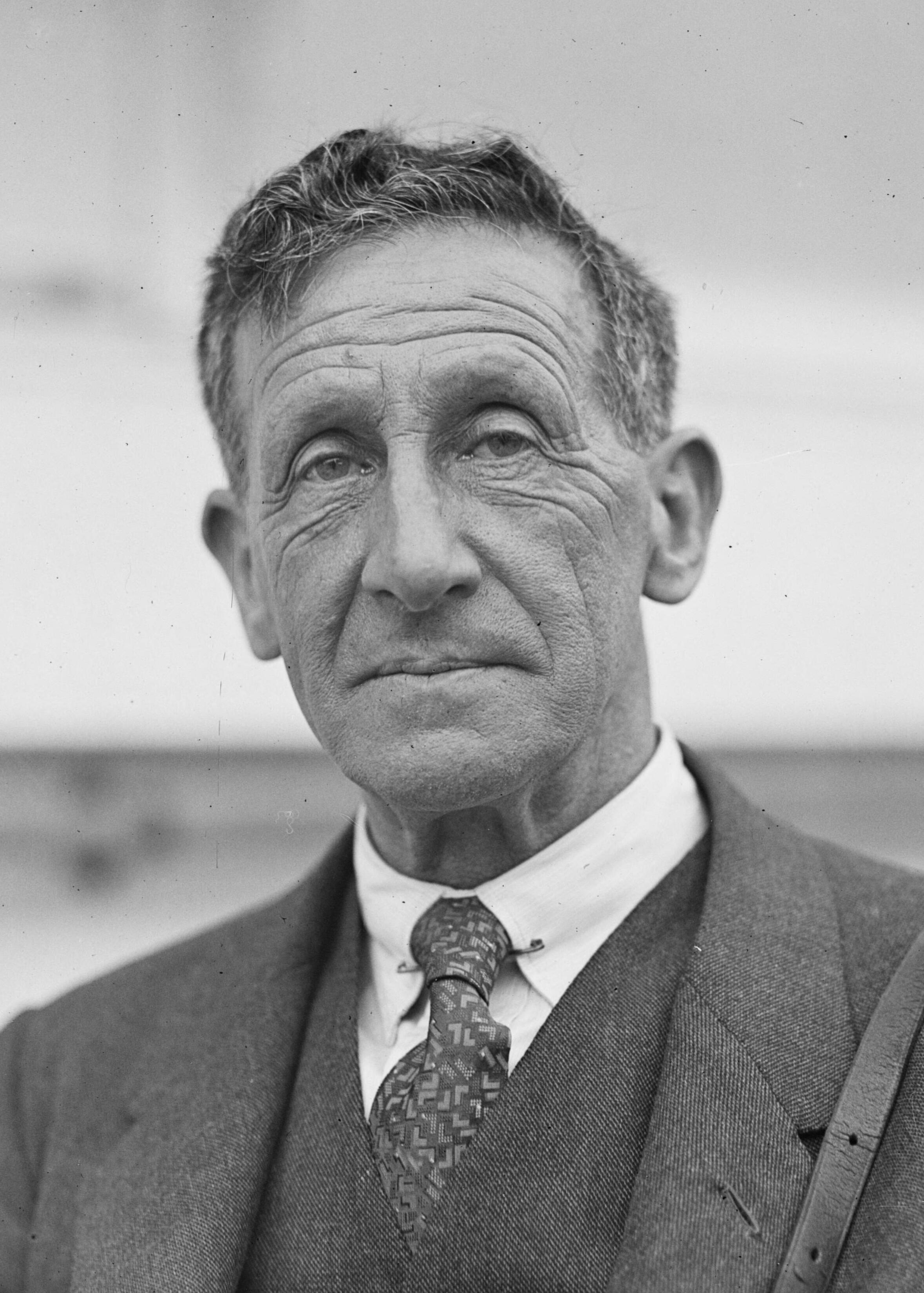
- Garran in 1931

Secretary of the Attorney-General's Department
- In office 1 January 1901 – 9 February 1932
- Preceded by: New office
- Succeeded by: George Knowles

Solicitor-General of Australia
- In office 1 September 1916 – 9 February 1932
- Preceded by: New office
- Succeeded by: George Knowles

Personal details
- Born: Robert Randolph Garran; 10 February 1867 Sydney, Colony of New South Wales
- Died: 11 January 1957 (aged 89) Canberra, Australian Capital Territory
- Spouse: Hilda Robson (m. 1902)
- Parent: Andrew Garran (father)
- Education: University of Sydney
- Occupation: Public servant; lawyer

Sir Robert Randolph Garran GCMG QC (10 February 1867 – 11 January 1957) was an Australian lawyer who became "Australia's first public servant" – the first federal government employee after the federation of the Australian colonies. He served as the departmental secretary of the Attorney-General's Department from 1901 to 1932, and after 1916 also held the position of Solicitor-General of Australia.

Garran was born in Sydney, the son of the journalist and politician Andrew Garran. He studied arts and law at the University of Sydney and was called to the bar in 1891. Garran was a keen supporter of the federation movement, and became acquainted with leading federalists like George Reid and Edmund Barton. At the 1897–98 constitutional convention he served as secretary of the drafting committee. On 1 January 1901, Garran was chosen by Barton's caretaker government as its first employee; for a brief period, he was the only member of the Commonwealth Public Service. His first duty was to write the inaugural edition of the Commonwealth Gazette, which contained Queen Victoria's proclamation authorising the creation of a federal government.

Over the following three decades, Garran provided legal advice to ten different prime ministers, from Barton to Joseph Lyons. He was considered an early expert in Australian constitutional law, and with John Quick published an annotated edition of the constitution that became a standard reference work. Garran developed a close relationship with Billy Hughes during World War I, and accompanied him to the Imperial War Cabinet and the Paris Peace Conference. Hughes, who was simultaneously prime minister and attorney-general, appointed him to the new position of solicitor-general and delegated numerous powers and responsibilities to him. He was knighted three times for his service to the Commonwealth, in 1917, in 1920 and in 1937.

In addition to his professional work, Garran was also an important figure in the development of the city of Canberra during its early years. He was one of the first public servants to relocate there after it replaced Melbourne as the capital in 1927. He founded several important cultural associations, organised the creation of the Canberra University College, and later contributed to the establishment of the Australian National University. Garran published at least eight books and many journal articles throughout his lifetime, covering such topics as constitutional law, the history of federalism in Australia, and German-language poetry. He was granted a state funeral upon his death in 1957, the first federal public servant to receive one.

== Early life ==
Garran was born in Sydney, New South Wales, the only son (among seven children) of journalist and politician Andrew Garran and his wife Mary Isham. His parents were both devout and committed to social justice, Mary campaigning for issues such as the promotion of education for women. Andrew had studied to become a church minister before becoming a journalist, with one biographer summing him up as "Congregationalist, Conservative, Liberal Reformer." He advocated free trade and Federation while editor of The Sydney Morning Herald and later promoted these ideas as a member of the New South Wales Legislative Council.

The family lived in Phillip Street in central Sydney. Garran's mother "had a deep distrust, well justified in those days, of milkman's milk" and so she kept a cow in the backyard, which would walk on its own to The Domain each day to graze and return twice a day to be milked. The Garrans later lived in the suburb of Darlinghurst, just to the east of the centre of the city.

Garran attended Sydney Grammar School from the age of ten, starting in 1877. He was a successful student, and became School Captain in 1884. He then studied arts and law at the University of Sydney, where he was awarded scholarships for classics, mathematics and general academic ability. Garran graduated with a Bachelor of Arts degree in 1888 and subsequently won the University's Medal in Philosophy when he was conferred with a Master of Arts with first-class honours in 1899.

After graduating, Garran began to study for the Bar examination. He was employed for a year with a firm of Sydney solicitors, and in 1890 served as associate to Justice William Charles Windeyer of the Supreme Court of New South Wales. Windeyer had a reputation for being a harsh and inflexible judge, particularly in criminal cases, where he was said to have "a rigorous and unrelenting sense of the retribution that he believed criminal justice demanded, [and] a sympathy verging on the emotional for the victims of crime." Garran however offered a different view, saying that "those who knew him well knew that under a brusque exterior he was the kindest of men", and his reputation had to some degree been created by misrepresentation. In 1891, Garran was admitted to the New South Wales Bar, where he commenced practice as a barrister, primarily working in equity.

== Federation movement ==
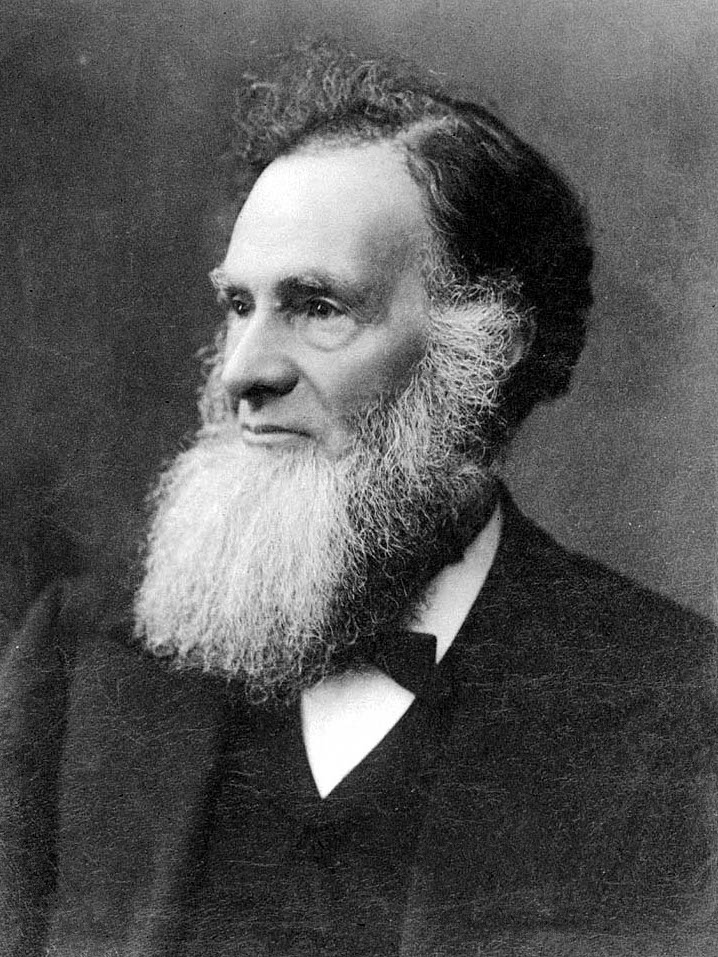
Portrait of Andrew Garran, Robert's father, in 1896

Garran, like his father, was strongly involved in the Australian Federation movement, the movement which sought to unite the British colonies in Australia (and, in early proposals, New Zealand) into one federated country. The first Constitutional Convention was held in 1891 in the chamber of the Legislative Council of New South Wales in Macquarie Street, Sydney, around the corner from Garran's chambers in Phillip Street; Garran regularly attended and sat in the public gallery to see "history... in the making under my very eyes." Garran later recalled with approval that the 1891 convention was the first with the courage to face the "lion in the path", the issue of customs duties and tariffs, which had previously divided states such as Victoria, who were in favour of protectionism, and states such as New South Wales, who were in favour of free trade. In Garran's view a clause proposed at the convention, which allowed for tariffs against international trade while ensuring free trade domestically (the predecessor to the final section 92 of the Constitution of Australia), "expressed the terms on which New South Wales was prepared to face the lion."

On joining the bar soon he became involved with Edmund Barton K.C., later the first Prime Minister of Australia, and the de facto leader of the federation movement in New South Wales. Garran, along with others such as Atlee Hunt, worked essentially as secretaries to Barton's federation campaign, drafting correspondence and planning meetings. At one late night meeting, planning a speech Barton was to give in the Sydney suburb of Ashfield, Barton expressed the phrase "For the first time, we have a nation for a continent, and a continent for a nation"; Garran later claimed that the now famous phrase "would have been unrecorded if I had not happened to jot it down."

In June 1893, when Barton's Australasian Federal League was formed at a meeting in the Sydney Town Hall, Garran joined immediately and was made a member of the executive committee. He was one of the League's four delegates to the 1893 Corowa Conference and a League delegate to the 1896 "People's Convention", or Bathurst Conference, a conference attended by Barton, Reid, League members, the Australian Natives' Association (mainly Victorian) and other pro-federation groups. At Corowa he was part of an impromptu group organised by John Quick which drafted a resolution, passed at the Conference, calling for a directly elected Constitutional Convention to be charged with drafting the Bill for the Constitution of Australia. The proposal, which came to be known as the Corowa Plan, was later accepted at the 1895 Premiers' Conference and formed the basis for the federation process over the following five years.

In 1897, Garran published The Coming Commonwealth, an influential book on the history of the Federation movement and the debate over the 1891 draft of the Constitution of Australia. The book was based on material he prepared for a course on federalism and federal systems of government, which he had planned to give at the University of Sydney, but which failed to attract a sufficient number of students. Nevertheless, the book was both unique and popular, as one of the few books on the topic at the time, with the first edition quickly selling out. Soon after its publication the Premier of New South Wales, George Reid, who had been elected as a New South Wales delegate to the 1897–1898 Constitutional Convention, invited Garran to be his secretary. At the Convention, Reid appointed him secretary of the Drafting Committee, at Barton's request; he was also a member of the Press Committee.

Garran recorded in a letter to his family during the convention's Melbourne sitting that:

The committee professes to find me very useful in unravelling the conundrums sent down by the finance committee... The last two nights I have found the drafting committee fagged [tired] and despairing, and now they have pitched the conundrums at me and gone out for a smoke; and then I worked out algebraic formulas to clear the thing up, drafted clauses accordingly, and when the committee returned we had plain sailing.

Garran joked that the long work of the drafting committee breached the Factory Acts, the group (primarily Barton, Richard O'Connor, John Downer and Garran) often working late into the night preparing drafts for the convention to consider and debate the next morning. On the evening before the convention's last day, Barton had gone to bed exhausted in the small hours, Garran and Charles Gavan Duffy finishing the final schedule of amendments at breakfast time. The convention concluded successfully, approving a final draft which ultimately, aside from a small amendment arranged at the last minute in London, became the Constitution of Australia.

Throughout 1898, following the completion of the proposed Constitution, Garran participated in the campaign promoting Federation leading up to the referendums at which the people of the colonies voted whether or not to approve the Constitution. He contributed a daily column to the Evening News, and had humorous poems critiquing opponents of federation published in The Bulletin. The following year, he began working with Quick on the Annotated Constitution of the Australian Commonwealth, a reference work on the Constitution including a history, and detailed discussion of each section analysing its meaning and its development at the Conventions. Published in 1901, the Annotated Constitution, commonly referred to simply as "Quick & Garran", soon became the standard work on the Constitution and is still regarded as one of the most important works on the subject.

== Public service ==
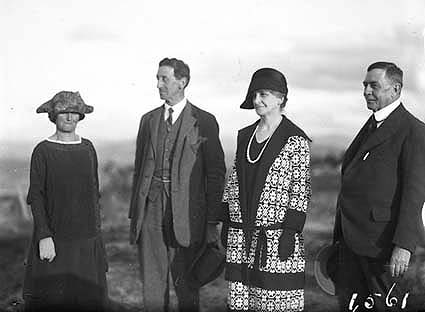
Garran and his wife Hilda (second and first from left respectively), and their friends Sir Littleton Groom and his wife Jessie (first and second from right respectively), photographed at Telopea Park in 1926

On the day that Federation was completed and Australia created, 1 January 1901, Garran, feeling like "a junior barrister suddenly promoted to the final court of appeal", was appointed secretary and Permanent Head of the Attorney-General's Department by the first Attorney-General of Australia, Alfred Deakin. Garran was the first, and for a time the only, public servant employed by the Government of Australia. Garran later said of this time that:

I was not only the head [of the department], but the tail. I was my own clerk and messenger. My first duty was to write out with my own hand Commonwealth Gazette No. 1 proclaiming the establishment of the Commonwealth and the appointment of ministers of state, and to send myself down with it to the government printer.

In this role, Garran was responsible for organising the first federal election in March 1901, and for organising the transfer of various government departments from the states to the federal government, including the Department of Defence, the postal and telegraphic services (now part of the Department of Communications, Information Technology and the Arts) and the Department of Trade and Customs (now part of the Department of Foreign Affairs and Trade). As parliamentary drafter, Garran also developed legislation to administer those new departments and other important legislation. As head of the Attorney General's department, Garran was also responsible for advice on the consistency of legislation with the Constitution, including the Commonwealth Franchise Act 1902 which by disenfranchising Aboriginals appeared to offend the Constitution's Section 41, which guaranteed the right to vote federally of anyone entitled to vote in a state. Garran advised that the Section could be neutered by interpreting it as no more than a grandfather clause of the right to vote of existing Aboriginal voters. The Act also conferred the right to vote on women federally, a cause Garran was, in private, gently mocking of.

Garran and his fellow staff aimed for a simple style of legislative drafting, a goal enabled by the fact that there was no pre-existing federal legislation on which their work would have to be based. In Garran's opinion the approach, which was put into practice many years before the similarly principled plain English movement became popular in government in the 1970s, was intended "to set an example of clear, straightforward language, free from technical jargon." Subsequent parliamentary drafters have noted that Garran was unusual in this respect for deliberately setting out to achieve and improve a particular drafting style, and that it was not until the early 1980s that such discipline among drafters re-emerged.

However, Garran himself admitted that his drafting could be overly simplistic, citing the first customs and excise legislation, developed with the Minister for Trade and Customs Charles Kingston and Assistant Parliamentary Draftsman Gordon Castle, as an example of the style taken to excess. The style was also once parodied by foundation High Court Justice Richard O'Connor as follows:

Every man shall wear –
(a) Coat
(b) Vest
(c) Trousers
Penalty: £100.

The Attorney-General's Department also managed litigation on behalf of the government. Initially the department contracted private law firms to actually conduct the litigation, but in 1903 the office of the Commonwealth Crown Solicitor was established, with Charles Powers the first to hold the job. The other Crown Solicitors that Garran worked with were Gordon Castle (with whom he had also worked as a drafter) and William Sharwood. In 1912, Garran was considered as a possible appointee to the High Court, following the expansion of the bench from five seats to seven and the death of Richard O'Connor. Billy Hughes, Attorney-General in the Fisher government at the time, later said Garran would have been appointed "but for the fact that he is too valuable a man for us to lose. We cannot spare him."

Garran worked with eleven Attorneys-General as Permanent Head of the Department. Garran regarded the first Attorney-General, Alfred Deakin, as an excellent thinker and a natural lawyer, and on occasion "[spoke] of Deakin as the Balfour of Australian politics." He was also very much impressed with the fifth Attorney-General, Isaac Isaacs, who was an extremely diligent worker, and two time Attorney-General Littleton Groom, who was "probably one of the most useful Ministers the Commonwealth has had."

=== Solicitor-General ===
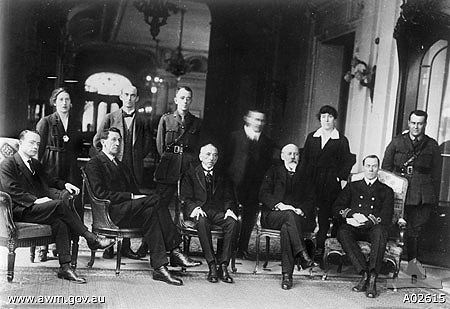
The Australian delegation to the Paris Peace Conference, 1919. Garran is in the front row, seated, second from left. Also pictured are Billy Hughes, front centre, and Sir Joseph Cook, seated, second from right.

In 1916, Garran was made the first Solicitor-General of Australia by Billy Hughes, who had since become Prime Minister as well as Attorney-General. The creation of the office and Garran's appointment to it represented a formal delegation of many of the powers and functions formerly exercised by the Attorney-General.

Garran developed a strong relationship with Hughes, giving him legal advice on the World War I conscription plebiscites and on the range of regulations which were made under the War Precautions Act 1914. The War Precautions Regulations had a broad scope, and were generally supported by the High Court, which adopted a much more flexible approach to the reach of the Commonwealth's defence power during wartime. A substantial amount of Garran's work during the war involved preparing and carrying out the regulations. Many of them were directed at maximising the economic aspect of the war effort and ensuring supplies of goods to Australian troops; others were directed at controlling citizens or former citizens of the enemy Central Powers living in Australia. On one occasion, when Hughes had been informed that at a party hosted by a German man, the band had played "Das Lied der Deutschen", Hughes asked Garran "By the way, what is this tune?" to which Garran replied that it was Haydn's melody to "Gott erhalte Franz den Kaiser", and as it was used as the tune to several hymns "it was probably sung in half a dozen churches in Sydney last Sunday." Hughes then said "Good Heavens! I have played that thing with one finger hundreds of times."

The partnership between Garran and Hughes is regarded by some as unusual, given that Garran was "tall, gentlemanly, wise and scholarly", and patient with his staff, whereas Hughes was "short of stature [and] renowned for bursts of temper." Nevertheless, the partnership was a successful one, with Hughes recognising the importance of Garran's constitutional expertise, remarking once about the World War I period that "the best way to govern Australia was to have Sir Robert Garran at [my] elbow, with a fountain pen and a blank sheet of paper, and the War Precautions Act." Likewise, Garran respected Hughes's strong leadership style, which had been important in guiding the country through the war, although in describing the Nationalist Party's loss in the 1922 federal election, Garran later said that "Hughes also overestimated his own hold on Parliament [although] his hold on the people was probably undiminished."

Garran accompanied Hughes and Joseph Cook (then the Minister for the Navy) to the 1917 and 1918 meetings of the Imperial War Cabinet in London, United Kingdom, and was also part of the British Empire delegation to the 1919 Paris Peace Conference in Paris, France. There he was on several of the treaty drafting committees, and contributed to many provisions, notably the portions of the League of Nations Covenant relating to League of Nations mandates. Though focusing mainly on League of Nations matters, Garran and John Latham (the head of Australian Naval Intelligence) had the status of technical advisers to Hughes and Cook, and so could attend the main conference and any of the associated councils. Observing the proceedings, Garran admired the "moral and physical courage" of French premier Georges Clemenceau, whom he regarded as determined to protect France from Germany but in a measured and temperate way; in Garran's words, Clemenceau "always withstood the excessive demands of the French chauvinists, of the French army, and of Foch himself". Garran viewed some similarities between British Prime Minister David Lloyd George and United States President Woodrow Wilson where others saw only differences, since Lloyd George "also had a strong vein of idealism in his character", and Wilson could be pragmatic when the situation called for it, such as in discussions relating to American interests. Garran also met other political and military leaders at the conference, including T. E. Lawrence, "an Oxford youth of 29 – he looks 18", who was modest and "without any affectation... in a company of two or three [he] could talk very interestingly, but at a larger gathering he was apt to be dumb."

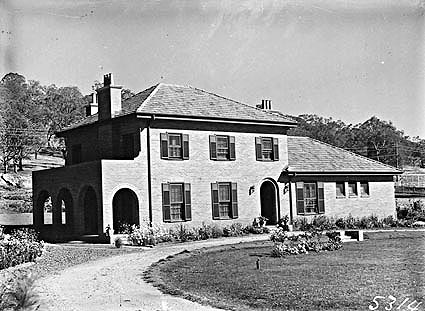
The Garran family house in Canberra, 22 Mugga Way, Red Hill

Following the war, Garran worked with Professor Harrison Moore of the University of Melbourne and South Australian judge Professor Jethro Brown on a report about proposed constitutional amendments which ultimately became the referendum questions put forward in the 1919 referendum. Garran attended two Imperial Conferences, accompanying Prime Minister Stanley Bruce in 1923 and in 1930 joining Prime Minister James Scullin and Attorney-General Frank Brennan, chair of the Drafting Committee which prepared drafts of agreements on various topics, such as merchant shipping. He also attended the eleventh League of Nations conference that year with them in Geneva, Switzerland. At the Royal Commission on the Constitution in 1927, Garran gave evidence over five days, where he discussed the history and origins of the Constitution and the evolution of the institutions established under it.

Through the 1920s and early 1930s, Garran prepared annual summaries of legislative developments in Australia, highlighting important individual pieces of legislation for the Journal of Comparative Legislation and International Law.

Towards the end of his time as Solicitor-General, Garran's work included the preparation of the Debt Conversion Agreement between the Government of Australia and the governments of the states, which involved the federal government taking over and managing the debts of the individual states, following the 1928 referendum. In 1930, he was asked by the Scullin government to provide an opinion on whether Norman Lindsay's novel Redheap was indecent and obscene within the terms of section 52(c) of the Customs Act 1901. He concluded that it was, and the Department of Trade and Customs subsequently banned the book from being imported into Australia, the first book by an Australian author to suffer such a ban. It has been suggested that Frank Forde, the Acting Minister for Trade and Customs, had already decided to ban the book, and sought Garran's advice primarily as a buffer against political criticism.

== Personal life and retirement ==
In 1902, Garran married Hilda Robson. Together they had four sons, Richard (born 1903), John (1905), Andrew (1906) and Isham Peter (1910). At this time the family lived in Melbourne, and the boys all attended Melbourne Grammar School and later studied at the University of Melbourne, attending Trinity College there.

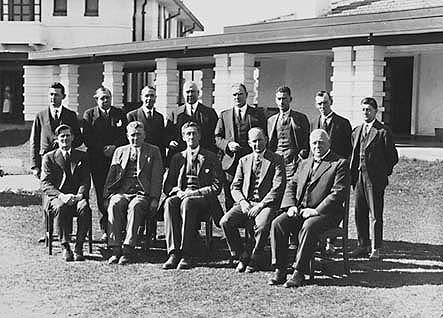
The presentation of the Charter of the Canberra Rotary Club, 1928, at the Hotel Canberra. Garran is seated, front centre.

In 1927, Garran had moved from his home in Melbourne to the newly established capital Canberra, one of the first public officials to do so (many government departments and their public servants did not move to Canberra until after World War II). He also worked within the Government to facilitate housing in Canberra for officials who needed to move there from other cities, and was involved in establishing cultural organisations in the city. In 1928 he was the inaugural President of the Canberra Rotary Club. In 1929, he formed the Canberra University Association in order to promote the formation of a university in Canberra, and in 1930 organised the establishment of Canberra University College (essentially a campus of the University of Melbourne) which taught undergraduate courses, chairing its council for its first twenty-three years. Throughout the 1920s and 1930s, Garran "consistently advocated the establishment of what he prophetically called 'a National University at Canberra' ", which would be primarily for specialist research and postgraduate study, in areas particularly relating to Australia, such as foreign relations with Asia and the Pacific region. This vision was evidently influential on the establishment of the Australian National University (ANU) in 1946, the only research-only university in the country (although in 1960 it amalgamated with Canberra University College to offer undergraduate courses).

Garran retired from his governmental positions on 9 February 1932, a fixed retirement date on the day before his sixty-fifth birthday. He soon returned to practise as a barrister, and within a month he was made a King's Counsel. However, he occasionally carried out more prominent work. In 1932, he was selected on the advice of the then Attorney-General John Latham to chair the Indian Defence Expenditure Tribunal, to advise on the dispute between India and the United Kingdom regarding the costs of the military defence of India. In 1934, along with John Keating, William Somerville and David John Gilbert, he formed a committee which prepared The Case for Union, the Government of Australia's official reply to the secessionist movement in the state of Western Australia.

Garran served on ANU's council from 1946 until 1951. Garran was also involved with the arts; he was a founding member of the Australian Institute of Arts and Literature and its president 1922-1927. He was the vice-president of the Canberra Musical Society, where he sang and played the clarinet, and in 1946 won a national song competition run by the Australian Broadcasting Corporation. Garran also published translations of Heinrich Heine's 1827 work Buch der Lieder ("Book of Songs") in 1924, and of the works of Franz Schubert and Robert Schumann in 1946.

He was known to be a great lover of poetry and languages. Geoffrey Sawer, the ANU Law professor, believed Garran had brought his quiet religious faith to bear in his life of service:

"The Commonwealth was fortunate in having through so much of its early history the services of such a man—superbly intelligent, with great practical commonsense, a Christian both in moral rectitude and in loving-kindness, selfless, devoid of any faintest touch of arrogance, priggishness or conceit, with a sense both of humour and of fun."

Garran died in 1957 in Canberra. He was granted a state funeral, the first given to a public servant of the Government of Australia, and was buried at St John's, Reid. He was survived by his four sons; his wife Hilda had died in 1936. His memoirs, Prosper the Commonwealth, were published posthumously in 1958, having been completed shortly before his death.

== Legacy ==
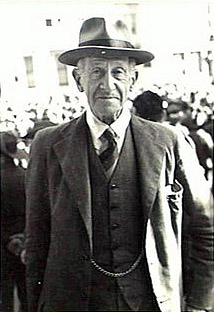
Garran at ANZAC Day celebrations at the cenotaph in Martin Place, Sydney, 25 April 1944

Garran's "personality, like his prose, was devoid of pedantry and pomposity and, though dignified, was laced with a quizzical turn of humour." His death "marked the end of a generation of public men for whom the cultural and the political were natural extensions of each other and who had the skills and talents to make such connections effortlessly."

Garran's friend Charles Studdy Daley, a long time civic administrator of the Australian Capital Territory, emphasised Garran's contribution to the early development of the city of Canberra, particularly its cultural life, remarking at a celebratory dinner for Garran in 1954 that:

"There has hardly been a cultural movement in this city with which Sir Robert has not been identified in loyal and inspiring support, as his constant aim has been that Canberra should be not only a great political centre but also a shrine to foster those things that stimulate and enrich our national life... his name will ever be inscribed in the annals, not only of Canberra, but of the Commonwealth as clarum et venerabile nomen gentibus.

However, Garran is perhaps best remembered as an expert on constitutional law, more so than for his other contributions to public service. At his death, Garran was one of the last remaining of the people involved with the creation of the Constitution of Australia. On his experience of Federation and the Constitution, Garran was always enthusiastic:

"I'm often asked 'has federation turned out as you expected?' Well yes and no. By and large the sort of thing we expected has happened but with differences. We knew the constitution was not perfect; it had to be a compromise with all the faults of a compromise... But, in spite of the unforeseen [sic] strains and stresses, the constitution has worked, on the whole, much as we thought it would. I think it now needs revision, to meet the needs of a changed world. But no-one could wish the work undone, who tries to imagine, what, in these stormy days, would have been the plight of six disunited Australian colonies."

Former Prime Minister John Howard, in describing Garran, said:

"I wonder though if we sometimes underestimate the changes, excitements, disruptions and adjustments previous generations have experienced. Sir Robert Garran knew the promise and reality of federation. He was part of the establishment of a public service which, in many ways, is clearly recognisable today."

At one level, Garran's career epitomizes the heyday, or Indian Summer, of the meritocratic bourgeois elite born in Australia in the third quarter of the 19th century. At another level, his influence as an éminence grise bespeaks his fluency in construction, be it in poetry translation or legislative drafts, even if always out of commonplace materials. He lacked the imagination to range beyond the stock assumptions of the day regarding race, sex and Empire, assumptions he fully shared.

== Honours ==
Garran was made a Commander of the Order of St Michael and St George (CMG) on the day that Federation was completed and Australia created, 1 January 1901, "in recognition of services in connection with the Federation of Australian Colonies and the establishment of the Commonwealth of Australia",

Garran was first knighted in 1917, and was appointed as a Knight Commander of the Order of St Michael and St George (KCMG) in 1920. He was knighted a third time in 1937 when he was made a Knight Grand Cross of the Order of St Michael and St George (GCMG).

Shortly after the establishment of the ANU in 1946, Garran became its first graduate when he was awarded an honorary doctorate of laws. He had already been awarded such an honorary doctorate from the University of Melbourne in 1937 and later receiving one from his alma mater, the University of Sydney in 1952.

=== Memorials ===
Garran's influence on Canberra is remembered by the naming of the suburb of Garran, Australian Capital Territory, established in 1966, after him. Garran's link with ANU is remembered by the naming of a chair in the university's School of Law, by the naming of the hall of residence Burton & Garran Hall, and by the naming of Garran house at Canberra Grammar School for his work with that school. The Garran oration, established to honour his memory, has been given yearly since 1959.

In 1983, the former Patent Office building, located at 2 National Circuit and occupied by the Federal Attorney General's Department, was renamed Robert Garran Offices. 2 National Circuit was renamed the Robert Marsden Hope Building in 2011, while an adjacent property at 3-5 National Circuit was subsequently renamed to the Robert Garran Offices.

== Publications ==
- A problem of federation under the crown; the representation of the crown in commonwealth and states (1895).
- The coming Commonwealth: an Australian handbook of federal government (1897).
- The Annotated Constitution of the Australian Commonwealth by Quick and Garran (1901).
- The government of South Africa (1908).
- The Making and Working of the Constitution (1932).
- The Making and Working of the Constitution (continued) (1932).
- The Case for union : a reply to the case for the secession of the state of Western Australia by Garran and 3 others (1934).
- Prosper the Commonwealth (1958).
- The book of songs Translated by Garran (1924).
- Schubert and Schumann : songs and translations Translated by Garran (1946).

== Sources ==
- Francis, Noel (1983). The Gifted Knight: Sir Robert Garran (PDF). Canberra: Noel Francis (Australia); Australian National University Press (worldwide). ISBN 978-0-9592095-0-1.
- "Garran Robert Randolph". Legal opinions. Australian Government Solicitor.
- Irving, Helen (2001). "Garran, Robert Randolph". In Blackshield, Tony; Coper, Michael; Williams, George (eds.). The Oxford Companion to the High Court of Australia. South Melbourne, Victoria: Oxford University Press. ISBN 978-0-19-554022-2.
- Zines, Leslie (January 2006). "Sir Robert Garran" (PDF). Papers on Parliament No 44. Parliament of Australia.

Legal offices
| New title | Solicitor-General of Australia; 1916–1932 | Succeeded by George Knowles |
Government offices
| New title Department established | Secretary of the Attorney-General's Department; 1901–1932 | Succeeded by George Knowles |
