= Commonwealth of Australia Gazette =

Government gazette of Australia

The Commonwealth of Australia Gazette is a publication of the Government of Australia, and consists of notices required by Commonwealth law to be published. Types of announcements in the Gazette include, appointments, promotions and transfers of persons to positions in the Australian Public Service (APS), previously "Commonwealth Public Service"; creation, dissolution and renaming of boards, departments and commissions within the APS; conferring of awards and honours to persons and organisations by the Government; calling of tenders and awarding of contracts by the Government.

Since 1 October 2012, the Gazette is no longer physically published or compiled and now only consists of individually searchable notices online. Prior to this, the Gazette was published weekly with each Gazette numbered, with the numbering beginning again at No. 1 each year.

== History ==
The creation, publication and dissemination of a governmental gazette was one of a myriad of bureaucratic functions attendant on the Federation of Australia on 1 January 1901.

The first Commonwealth Gazette, dated 1 January 1901, was written by Robert Garran and published on 2 January 1901. It contained Queen Victoria's proclamation dated 17 September 1900, for the establishment of the Commonwealth, the announcement of the appointment of ministers and their respective offices, and of the appointment of the Governor-General and his staff. The appearance of the first Gazette was reported by newspapers in every state, some in considerable detail.

Some historic issues
The primary purpose of a Gazette was, and is, of the ordinary "housekeeping" of a large organisation; of little interest to any but employees and others immediately affected and, retrospectively, to historians, but on occasion of great moment to the whole population:

- The second issue, termed "Extraordinary" was dated 23 January 1901, and consisted of a single page authorised by the Prime Minister, Edmund Barton, announcing the death of Her Majesty, Queen Victoria. A large number of Australian newspapers reported the contents of this Gazette verbatim. Issues 3 to 5, also termed "Extraordinary" were published on 24, 28 and 31 January 1901, and dealt with protocol to be observed relating to the Sovereign's death, mourning etc., and proclamation of the accession to the Throne of King and Emperor Edward the Seventh.
- During the 1914 Constitutional crisis which resulted in the first double dissolution of the Australian parliament, newspapers cited the Gazette as an authoritative source of information.
- On the eve of Australia's entry into the Great War of 1914–1918, enemy merchant shipping was notified in the Gazette of 5 August 1914 of "days of grace" whereby they could return to their home ports unhindered. Such preparations for World War I were reported in the Australian press.
- With the heightening of tensions following aggressive actions by Germany, the Gazette published on 1 September 1939 a special issue detailing imposition of censorship of international communication, which was relayed by news channels. Official notification to the Australian public on 3 September 1939 of a state of war between Great Britain and Germany was reported extensively.

=== 1974 to present ===
By 1974 the Gazette had become so large and unwieldy that it was decided to split it into four separate publications, numbered independently:

- Government Notices Gazette is published weekly and covers all legislation, changes to Australian Government departments and other notices required under Commonwealth law. Their Numbers are prefixed "G" or "GN".
- Special Notices Gazette may be published at any time, and usually consists of a single announcement. Their numbers are prefixed "S".
- Periodic Notices Gazette may be published at any time, and consists of a set of notices relating to a specific subject. Their numbers are prefixed "P".
- Australian Public Service Gazette is published weekly and includes notices of examination; and Australian Public Service and Parliamentary Service vacancies, transfers, promotions and terminations. Their Numbers are prefixed "PS".

Since 1974 a range of other gazettes has been issued by the Australian Government. Their number and titles have not been constant; the current (2017) list includes:

- Government Purchasing
- Business Gazette
- Australian Securities and Investments Commission (ASIC) Gazette
- Tariff Concessions Gazette
- Chemical Gazette
- Australian Pesticides and Veterinary Medicines Authority (APVMA) Gazette
- Food Standards Gazette

APSjobs is a website which incorporates an electronic version of the APS Employment Gazette.

== Historic ==
The Commonwealth Gazette for the years 1901–1957 has been digitised by the National Library of Australia and is available online through Trove.

== See also ==
- List of government gazettes
