= Banco Chambers =

- Formation: 2005
- Type: Barrister's Chambers
- Head of Chambers: Cameron Moore SC
- Website: www.banco.net.au

Banco Chambers is a barristers' chambers in Sydney, Australia. The chambers was established in 2005 and the current head of chambers is Cameron Moore SC. Members include Justin Gleeson SC, former Solicitor-General of Australia.

== Barristers ==
The floor has over 45 members of varying levels of seniority. The members of the floor who are senior counsel are: John Sheahan KC, Tom Blackburn SC, Peter Brereton SC, Robert Dick SC, Justin Gleeson SC, Richard McHugh SC, Cameron Moore SC, Katherine Richardson SC, Ruth Higgins SC, Farid Assaf SC, Vanessa Whittaker SC, Kristen Deards SC, Tiffany Wong SC, Jonathon Redwood SC, James Emmett SC, Christopher Withers SC, Tim Breakspear SC, Anne Horvath SC, David Sulan SC and Nicholas Bender SC.

The chambers has been ranked in Band 1 for the Australian Bar in online magazine Chambers and Partners Guide to the World's Leading Lawyers. Individual members have received recognition in the practices of Dispute Resolution, Insolvency, Competition Law, Intellectual Property, Construction, and Taxation.

== Members ==
=== Former members ===
- Fabian Gleeson SC, a justice of the New South Wales Court of Appeal and the Supreme Court of New South Wales
- Christine Adamson SC, a justice of the Supreme Court of New South Wales
- Simon Kerr SC
- Sandy Dawson SC
- Robert Newlinds SC DCJ, a judge of the District Court of NSW
