= Queen's Hall, Melbourne =

Former theatre in Melbourne, Australia

Coordinates: 37.8152°S 144.9677°E

Queen's Hall was a little theatre in Collins Street, Melbourne, situated between Russell and Swanston streets. It operated from 1920 to 1937, when its building was demolished.

== History ==
Some Melbourne theatres
1 Central Hall, Little Collins Street
2 The Auditorium
3 Queen's Hall

In late 1920 the Melbourne lodge of the Theosophical Society (TS) purchased from the Sir Samuel Gillott estate a property at 181–187 Collins Street, at the rear of which was an old warehouse which, after some modifications, they named Queen's Hall, to be used for Society meetings and by August 1920 were hiring it out to various organisations.

One notable user of the hall was J. Beresford Fowler and his "Little Art Theatre" players, presenting modern plays on its "absurdly small" stage 1925 to 1936, when they were obliged to quit due to forthcoming building work. Minnie Hooper's ballet school used the hall for some concerts, and perhaps for classes.

The two buildings were demolished in 1937, to be replaced by a five-storey office block for the Theosophical Society, completed in October of that year. Nothing has yet been found of its history after 1940, except that sometime before 1946 Federal government offices renting space in the TS building were vacated. It still stands, in something like its 1930s condition and is on the National Trust database as File no. B4116.

The Theosophical Society building was adjacent the Auditorium building and is not to be confused with the Society's five-storey building at 124–130 Russell Street, which TS purchased in 1972 and sold in 2017.
