= Stephen Donaghue =

Australian barrister (born 1973)

Judge of the Court of Appeal of Victoria
- Incumbent
- Assumed office 27 January 2026

Solicitor-General of Australia
- In office 16 January 2017 – 16 December 2025
- Appointed by: Peter Cosgrove
- Preceded by: Justin Gleeson
- Succeeded by: Ruth Higgins

Personal details
- Born: Stephen Paul Donaghue; 7 January 1973 (age 53) Melbourne, Victoria, Australia
- Spouse: Carolyn Evans
- Education: University of Melbourne (BA, LLB); Magdalen College, Oxford (DPhil)
- Occupation: Barrister; Judge

Stephen Paul Donaghue (born 7 January 1973) is an Australian barrister and constitutional lawyer who is a judge of the Court of Appeal of Victoria. He was previously the Solicitor-General of Australia from 2017 to 2025.

Born in 1973, Donaghue was educated at Whitefriars College in Donvale, then studied for a Bachelor of Arts and Bachelor of Laws at the University of Melbourne, where he was editor of the Melbourne University Law Review and won the Supreme Court Prize. In 1996, Donaghue was granted a Menzies Scholarship and attended Magdalen College at the University of Oxford from which he received a doctorate.

In 1995, Donaghue joined the firm MinterEllison as a solicitor. In 2000, he was an associate to Kenneth Hayne, former Justice of the High Court of Australia. He became a barrister in 2001, and in 2011 was appointed as a Senior Counsel, becoming a Queen's Counsel in 2014 when the title was restored by the Victorian government.

Donaghue was appointed as the Solicitor-General of Australia on 16 January 2017, following the resignation of Justin Gleeson. On 16 December 2025, the Supreme Court of Victoria announced that Donaghue had been appointed as a Justice of the Court of Appeal, effective 27 January 2026.

== Personal Life ==
Donaghue is married to Carolyn Evans, who is vice-chancellor of the University of Melbourne. They have two children.

Government offices
Preceded by Justin Gleeson	Solicitor-General of Australia; 2017–2025	Succeeded by Ruth Higgins
