= Garrick Theatre (Melbourne) =

Former theatre in Melbourne, Australia

The Garrick Theatre was a theatre in the former Aikman Street, near Princes Bridge, in the Southbank area of Melbourne, Australia.

It opened in 1912 as the Snowden Picture Theatre. In 1916, it was renovated as The Playhouse, a legitimate theatre with stalls and a dress circle seating around 770 for the Melbourne Repertory Theatre. J. Beresford Fowler played Ibsen in 1922 and Nellie Melba sang there. In 1933 it was purchased by S. Perry and the name changed to the Garrick Theatre where it hosted productions by the Gregan McMahon Players and producer F. W. Thring.

It was put up for auction in February 1937 but failed to attract a bid, then closed in 1937 after the site was sold to Australian Paper Manufacturers Limited. The final play was Milestones, performed on August 7, 1937, with the theatre dismantled shortly thereafter.

The theatre's seating was donated for use in the University of Melbourne's Union Theatre.
