= Ruth McColl =

Australian judge

The Honourable Justice Ruth Stephanie McColl AO

Judge of Appeal, NSW Court of Appeal
- In office 29 April 2003 – 27 January 2019

Personal details
- Born: 1950 (age 75–76)
- Education: Willoughby Girls' High School; University of Sydney
- Occupation: Judge, Lawyer

Ruth Stephanie McColl AO (born 1950) was a judge of the Court of Appeal of the Supreme Court of New South Wales, the highest court in the State of New South Wales, Australia, which forms part of the Australian court hierarchy.

== Education ==
McColl studied at Willoughby Girls' High School. She graduated with a Bachelor of Arts and Bachelor of Laws from the University of Sydney in 1975.

== Career ==
McColl worked as a solicitor in the NSW Crown Solicitor's Office from 1976 to 1980.

In 1980, McColl was admitted to the NSW Bar. She was appointed senior counsel in 1994. From 1981 until 2001 McColl was elected as a member of the Bar Council of the NSW Bar Association and from 1999 to 2001 she was president of the New South Wales Bar Association – the first woman to serve in that position. From 2001 to 2002, McColl was president of the Australian Bar Association,

McColl has also served as vice-president of Australian Women Lawyers (1996–99) and President of NSW Women Lawyers (1996–1997). She has been a part-time Commissioner of the New South Wales Law Reform Commission, President of the Public Interest Law Clearing House (1999–2002), Assistant Commissioner of the Independent Commission Against Corruption (1998–2000), and Counsel assisting the Coroner in relation to the inquest into the 1997 Thredbo landslide.

In 2003, McColl was appointed a judge of appeal of the NSW Court of Appeal.

McColl is the current president of the Judicial Conference of Australia.

== Honours ==
In 2004, McColl was made an Officer of the Order of Australia for service to the law, to continuing professional development and education, particularly for women, and to the community in matters affecting Indigenous groups and youth.
