= Andrew Garran =

Australian politician (1825–1901)

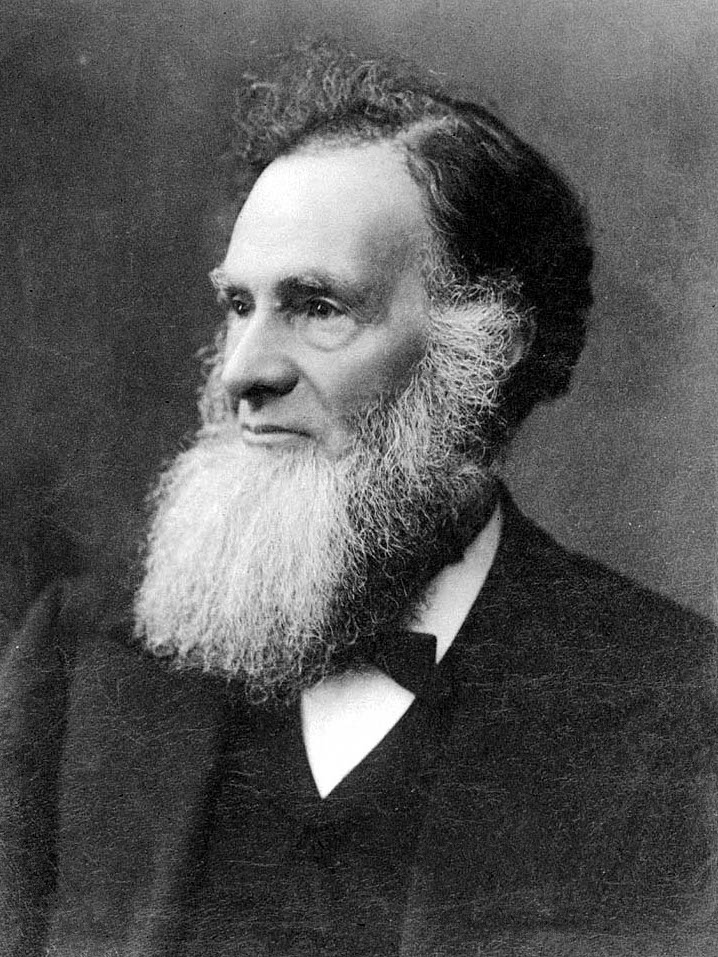
- Portrait of Garran in 1896

Vice-President of Executive Council and Representative of Government, New South Wales Legislative Council
- In office 19 March 1895 – 18 November 1898

New South Wales Legislative Council
- In office 8 March 1887 – 19 October 1892

Personal details
- Born: 19 November 1825 London
- Died: 6 June 1901 (aged 75) Darlinghurst, New South Wales
- Spouse: Mary Isham Sabine (m. 1852; wid. 1901)
- Children: Robert Garran (son) and 7 daughters
- Education: University of Sydney (LLD, LLB); University of London (MA)
- Occupation: Newspaper editor; Politician

Andrew Garran (19 November 1825 – 6 June 1901), English-Australian journalist and politician, was the editor of the Sydney Morning Herald from 1873 to 1885.

== Biography ==
Garran was born in London in 1825, surnamed "Gammon" according to historian A. T. Saunders. He was educated at Hackney Grammar School in the Hackney borough of London, and at Spring Hill College, Birmingham. He also attended a theological college in Norfolk, where he trained to be a Congregationalist minister. He later studied at the University of London, graduating with a Master of Arts degree in 1848. Due to poor health, he spent eighteen months as a private tutor in the Madeira Islands seeking a better climate, returning to London the following year. In 1850 he moved to Australia, where he settled in Adelaide, South Australia.

On arrival in Adelaide he worked briefly as a minister, and from 1851 to 1852 he wrote for the short-lived weekly newspaper Austral Examiner, before it closed due to the Victorian Gold Rush, which saw many people migrate to the Victorian goldfields. Garran himself travelled to Victoria, where he was a tutor in the town of Ballan. He returned to South Australia in 1854, where he became the editor of the South Australian Register. On 1 December that same year, he married Mary Isham Sabine (18 October 1829 – 30 July 1923), with whom he had one son and seven daughters. According to Saunders, Sabine was a niece of Mrs T. Q. Stow (née Eppes).

Andrew and Mary Garran left South Australia in 1856 for Sydney, New South Wales, after John Fairfax offered Andrew the position of assistant editor at the Sydney Morning Herald. The family lived in a terrace on Phillip Street, near Martin Place, where they kept a dairy cow, which would graze during the day in The Domain. While working for the Herald, Garran studied at the University of Sydney, graduating with a Bachelor of Laws degree in 1868 and a Doctorate of Laws in 1870. When the editor of the Herald, John West, died in December 1873, Garran was promptly promoted. Garran was one of the earliest supporters of the federation of Australia, and used his position in the media to advocate the cause, writing many editorials in favour of federation. He served as editor until 1885, when poor health forced him to resign, after spending nearly thirty years at the newspaper.

However, Garran did not retire completely, and on 15 February 1887 was given a life appointment to the New South Wales Legislative Council. In 1890, the Premier of New South Wales, Henry Parkes, appointed Garran as president of the Royal Commission into the 1890 Australian maritime dispute. In 1892 he resigned from the Legislative Council in order to take up the position of president of the New South Wales Council of Arbitration, although he resigned from that position in 1894 and re-entered the Legislative Council. From March 1895 to November 1898, Garran was the leader of the Reid government in the Legislative Council, and vice-president of the Executive Council of New South Wales.

Throughout his career Garran held a number of other positions. He was a director of the Newcastle Wallsend Coal Company from 1869, and the chairman from 1874 to 1879. He was a member of the New South Wales Board of Technical Education, and was a trustee of Sydney Grammar School. He was the correspondent for London's The Times for many years, continuing up until his death.

Garran died on 6 June 1901 (aged 75), in the Sydney suburb of Darlinghurst. He was survived by his wife and six of his eight children. His son Robert Garran also studied law, and went on to become a leading expert in Australian constitutional law, together with John Quick writing The Annotated Constitution of the Australian Commonwealth.
