= Murphyores Inc Pty Ltd v Commonwealth =

- Court: High Court of Australia
- Full case name: Murphyores Inc Pty Ltd v The Commonwealth of Australia
- Decided: 14 April 1976
- Citations: [1976] HCA 20, (1976) 136 CLR 1

Court membership
- Judges sitting: Barwick CJ, McTiernan, Gibbs, Stephen, Mason, Jacobs & Murphy JJ

Case opinions
- (7:0) Section 112 of the Customs Act 1901 (Cth) was a constitutionally valid law under the trade and commerce power

Murphyores Inc Pty Ltd v Commonwealth, was a case decided in the High Court of Australia regarding the scope of the trade and commerce power in section 51(i) of the Constitution.

== Background ==
Section 112 of the Customs Act 1901, prohibited the exportation of mineral sands unless authorised by the Minister. Murphyores Inc Pty Ltd, which held leases from the state of Queensland to mine mineral sands on Fraser Island, sought permission from the Minister to export mineral sands. Such authorisation was withheld pending the outcome of an environmental inquiry. Murphyores challenged the constitutional validity of prohibition and sought an injunction to the study, and a declaration that the Minister cannot make a prohibition for environmental purposes.

== Decision ==
In a unanimous decision, the court held the legislation was a valid exercise of the trade and commerce power. Section 51(i) was a non-purposive power, and the only relevant factor was the subject matter of trade and commerce. The motive and purpose behind the legislation was irrelevant.

== See also ==
- Section 51(i) of the Australian Constitution
- Australian constitutional law
