= Justin Gleeson =

Australian lawyer (born 1961)

Justin Gleeson SC
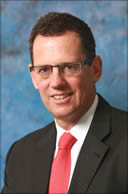

Solicitor-General of Australia
- In office 14 February 2012 – 6 November 2016
- Appointed by: Quentin Bryce
- Preceded by: Stephen Gageler
- Succeeded by: Stephen Donaghue

Personal details
- Born: Justin Thomas Gleeson; 9 April 1961 (age 65) Sydney, New South Wales, Australia
- Education: University of Sydney; University of Oxford
- Occupation: Barrister, Solicitor-General of Australia

Justin Thomas Gleeson SC (born 9 April 1961) is an Australian lawyer and former Solicitor-General of Australia, the Commonwealth's second-ranking law officer.

== Early life and education ==
Gleeson was educated at St Patrick's College, Strathfield, then the University of Sydney, from which he graduated with a Bachelor of Arts and Bachelor of Laws (University Medal and First-Class Honours). Gleeson undertook postgraduate studies in the law at the University of Oxford, where he earned a Bachelor of Civil Law.

== Career ==
Gleeson was appointed Solicitor-General in 2012, having acted in that capacity since the departure of Stephen Gageler the previous year. Prior to his appointment, Gleeson was the Head of Banco Chambers.

Following a disagreement with the Commonwealth Attorney-General, George Brandis, about a direction made by the Attorney-General which restricted access to the Solicitor-General, Gleeson announced that he would resign with effect from 7 November 2016. In his resignation letter, Gleeson stated that his relationship with the Attorney-General was "irretrievably broken".

Following his resignation, Gleeson rejoined private practice and returned to Banco Chambers, the chambers that he founded. In addition to acting as counsel in domestic courts, Gleeson is also currently working as an international arbitrator.

In September 2017, Gleeson joined the legal team of Tony Windsor, led by Ron Merkel QC, in the High Court case Re: Joyce, one of the seven cases constituting the 2017 Australian constitutional crisis.

== Personal life ==
Justin is married to academic and author Dr Bernadette Brennan. They have two daughters Madeline and Caitlin. His father is Gerald Gleeson AC, a former senior public servant in the Labor Government in New South Wales. One of his brothers, Fabian Gleeson, is a former judge of the New South Wales Court of Appeal. His father-in-law is former High Court Chief Justice Sir Gerard Brennan. His elder daughter is author Madeline Gleeson.

Government offices
Preceded by Stephen Gageler	Solicitor-General of Australia; 2013–2016	Succeeded by Stephen Donaghue
