= Legal Profession Uniform Law (NSW) =

New South Wales legislation regulating the legal profession

The Legal Profession Uniform Law Act (LPUL) took effect in New South Wales on 1 July 2015. The Uniform Law creates a common legal services market across NSW and Victoria, encompassing almost three-quarters of Australia's lawyers. The scheme aims to harmonize regulatory obligations while retaining local performance of regulatory functions.

The Uniform Law regulates the legal profession across the two jurisdictions, governing matters such as practicing certificate types and conditions, maintaining and auditing of trust accounts, continuing professional development requirements, complaints-handling processes, billing arrangements, and professional discipline issues.

The Uniform Law creates two bodies: The Legal Services Council, and the Commissioner for Uniform Legal Services Regulation, who also acts as CEO of the Legal Services Council. Together, these bodies set policy framework for the new scheme, and refine the way it operates by issuing guidelines and directives for the sake of consistency; making regulations; and advising Attorneys General on any potential amendments.

In July 2022 Western Australia entered the Uniform Law Scheme.
