= New South Wales Bar Association =

Association of barristers in the Australian state of New South Wales

The New South Wales Bar Association
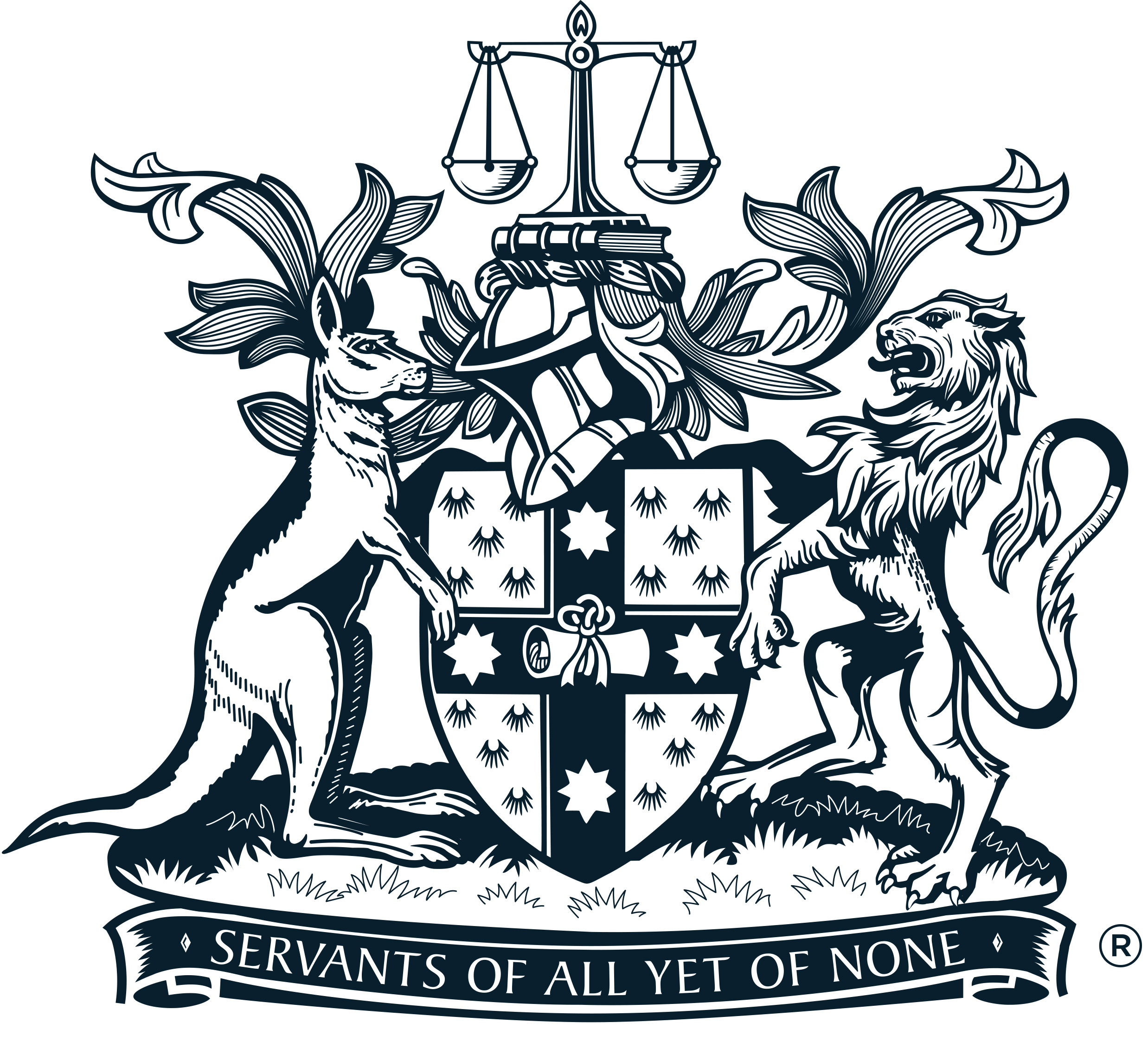
- Abbreviation: NSWBar
- Formation: 1936
- Legal status: Bar Association
- Purpose: Regulation of Barristers
- Headquarters: Sydney
- Location: Australia
- Region served: New South Wales
- Members: 2,362 practising; 3,218 total (as at 30 June 2023)
- President: Dr Ruth Higgins SC
- Affiliations: Australian Bar Association
- Website: www.nswbar.asn.au

The New South Wales Bar Association is a professional body of lawyers responsible for the regulation of the legal profession in the state of New South Wales, Australia. The body administers the bar examination in accordance with the Legal Profession Uniform Law.

== History ==
Formerly known as the Council of the Bar of New South Wales, the organisation was incorporated on 22 October 1936 as The New South Wales Bar Association. The College of Arms granted the Bar Association's coat of arms in 1959.

=== Presidents ===
President	Commenced	Ended	Notes
Richard Clive Teece	November 1936	December 1947	
Alan Taylor	December 1947	December 1949	
Garfield Barwick	December 1949	November 1952	
Keith Ferguson	November 1952	November 1954	
Sir Garfield Barwick	November 1954	November 1956	
Gordon Wallace	November 1956	December 1958	
Bruce MacFarlan	December 1958	July 1959	(Note: Resigned to take up an appointment to the Supreme Court of New South Wales.)
Nigel Bowen	July 1959	November 1961	
Leycester Meares	November 1961	December 1963	
John Kerr	December 1963	December 1964	
John Holmes	December 1964	November 1965	
Maurice Byers	November 1965	November 1967	
Bernard Riley	November 1967	December 1969	
Philip Woodward	December 1969	October 1971	
Gordon Samuels	October 1971	November 1972	
Denys Needham	November 1972	December 1972	
Harold Glass	December 1972	September 1973	
Tom Hughes	September 1973	December 1975	
Douglas McGregor	December 1975	November 1977	
Trevor Morling	November 1977	December 1979	
Roddy Meagher	December 1979	November 1981	
Michael McHugh	November 1981	December 1983	
Murray Gleeson	December 1983	December 1985	
Roger Gyles	December 1985	November 1987	
Kenneth Handley	November 1987	November 1989	
Barry O'Keefe	November 1989	December 1991	
John Coombs	December 1991	November 1993	
Murray Tobias	November 1993	November 1995	
David Bennett	November 1995	December 1997	
Ian Barker	December 1997	November 1999	
Ruth McColl	November 1999	November 2001	
Bret Walker	November 2001	November 2003	
Ian Harrison	November 2003	November 2005	
Michael Slattery	November 2005	November 2007	
Anna Katzmann	November 2007	November 2009	
Tom Bathurst	November 2009	May 2011	
Bernard Coles	May 2011	November 2012	
Phillip Boulten	November 2012	May 2014	
Jane Needham	May 2014	November 2015	(Note: Jane Needham is the daughter of former president Denys Needham)
Noel Hutley	November 2015	May 2017	
Arthur Moses	May 2017	November 2018	
Tim Game	November 2018	November 2020	
Michael McHugh	November 2020	May 2022	
Gabrielle Bashir	May 2022	November 2023	
Ruth Higgins	November 2023		

== Arms ==
Coat of arms of New South Wales Bar Association
Notes The arms of the New South Wales Bar Association, granted by the Garter, Clarenceux and Norroy & Ulster Kings of Arms on 22 March 1960, consist of: Adopted 1960 Crest On a Wreath Or and Gules, a closed Book proper, standing thereon a pair of Scales Or. Escutcheon Ermine, on a Cross Gules a Brief Scroll fessewise proper, Taped Gules, between four Stars each of eight points Or. Supporters On the dexter side a Kangaroo, and on the sinister a Lion, both proper. Badge A Brief Scroll fessewise proper, Taped Gules.
