= Adrian Consett Stephen =

Australian playwright and World War I soldier (1894–1918)

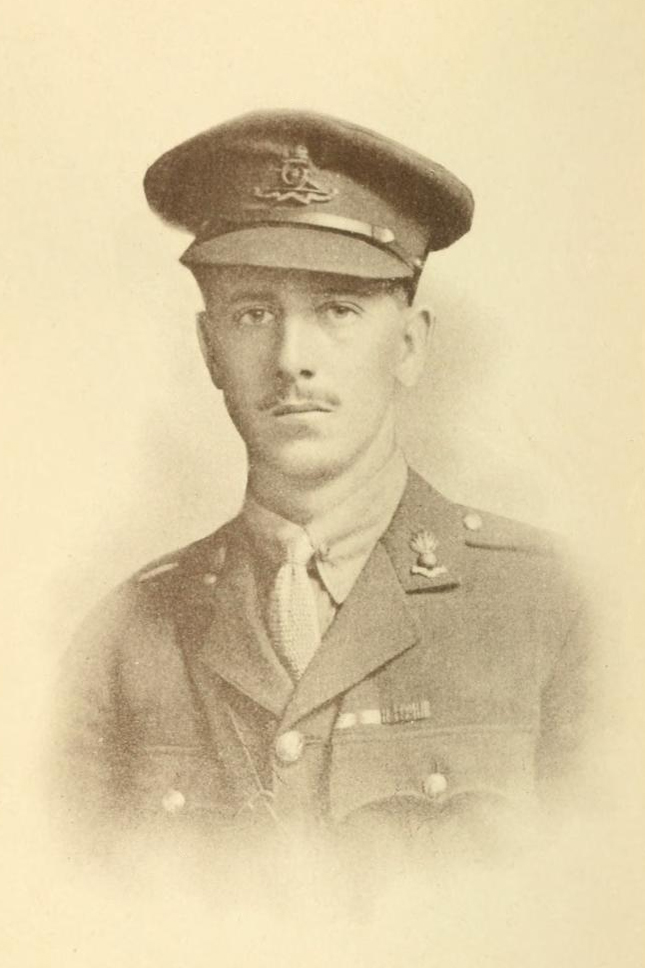

Major Adrian Consett Stephen MC (1894 – 14 March 1918) was an Australian artillery officer and playwright. He was awarded the Military Cross during World War I.

== History ==
Stephen was the second son of solicitor Consett Stephen, of the Sydney firm of Stephen, Jaques, and Stephen. He was educated at Sydney Grammar School and the University of Sydney, graduating BA in 1913 and LL.B in 1915. He enlisted in 1916 and fought in France with the Royal Field Artillery. He was mentioned in despatches in May 1917, awarded the Croix de Guerre in June 1917 for action on The Somme, then the Military Cross in October 1917 for his conduct at the Battle of Passchendaele.

== Works ==
- 1908 Echoes
- 1918 Four plays
- 1918 Stories, burlesques and letters from Hermes
- 1918 An Australian in the R.F.A. (letters and diary)

== Productions ==
On 7 December 1922 his "hopelessly pessimistic" play Futurity was presented at the Institute of Arts and Letters clubroom by members of the Institute, led by Beresford Fowler.

== Commemoration ==
In 1930 Stephen's father presented to the Community Playhouse the "Adrian Consett Stephen Cup" to be awarded to the "Australian one-act play of greatest literary merit".
