= Leslie Zines =

Australian scholar of constitutional law

Leslie Ronald Zines AO FASSA
- Born: 12 December 1930; Sydney
- Died: 31 May 2014 (aged 83); Canberra
- Occupation: Academic

Academic background
- Education: University of Sydney, Harvard University

Academic work
- Discipline: Australian constitutional law

Leslie Zines AO (12 December 1930 – 31 May 2014) was an Australian scholar of constitutional law.

He studied law at the University of Sydney and Harvard University and was admitted to practice in 1953. He spent over 30 years working at the Australian National University, becoming a professor in 1967. The first edition of his influential book The High Court and the Constitution was published in 1981. He appeared as junior counsel for Tasmania in the Tasmanian Dam Case, and his work was cited in the judgments of Deane J and Dawson J.

Zines was elected a Fellow of the Academy of the Social Sciences in Australia in 1987. He was appointed an Officer of the Order of Australia in 1992.
