= Solicitor-General of Australia =

Second law officer of Australia

- Incumbent; Ruth Higgins since 8 June 2026
- Attorney-General's Department
- Appointer: Governor-General on the recommendation of the Prime Minister
- Term length: 5 years
- Inaugural holder: Sir Robert Garran
- Formation: 1916

The solicitor-general of Australia (officially the solicitor-general of the Commonwealth) is the country's second highest-ranking law officer, after the Attorney-General for Australia. The current position is currently held by Ruth Higgins, whose term commenced in June 2026.

The Commonwealth Solicitor-General gives the Australian federal government legal advice and appears in court to represent the Commonwealth's interest in important legal proceedings, particularly in the High Court. The Solicitor-General notably offered advice to the government and defended members of parliament in court during the Australian Parliamentary eligibility crisis. Unlike the Australian attorney-general or the same position in England and Wales, the solicitor-general is not a member of parliament.

== History ==
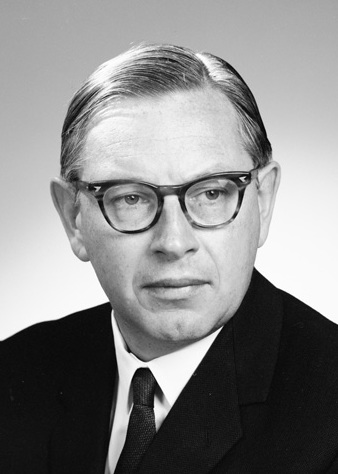
Anthony Mason, Solicitor-General of Australia between 1964–1969.

The office was created in 1916 with the appointment of Sir Robert Garran. Prior to this, from 1903 to 1913 Sir Charles Powers had served as the first Commonwealth Crown Solicitor, which later became the Australian Government Solicitor. Sir Charles Powers was also sometimes referred to as the "Solicitor-General", but the two offices are separate: Powers was succeeded in 1913 as Crown Solicitor by Gordon Castle, whereas the first Solicitor-General, Robert Garran, was not appointed until 1916.

The creation of the role owed much to circumstances, when Attorney-General Billy Hughes became Prime Minister of Australia but retained his position as Attorney-General. Robert Garran had already been permanent secretary of the Attorney-General's Department since Federation, and the new position recognised the additional responsibilities that Hughes now delegated to him. The name "Solicitor-General" is taken from the title of the deputy of the Attorney General for England and Wales, first appointed in 1461, with the name "solicitor general" becoming standard from 1536. Unlike the Australian position however, the British position is by convention filled by a member of parliament.

Garran continued in the position of Solicitor-General and permanent head of the Attorney-General's Department until his retirement in 1932. His successor, George Knowles, inherited both positions as well as the position of Parliamentary Draftsman. The position of Parliamentary Draftsman became a separate role in 1946. The positions of Solicitor-General and permanent secretary to the Attorney-General's Department were not separated until 1964, when Anthony Mason became Solicitor-General but Ted Hook was appointed permanent secretary. The Law Officers Act (Cth), enacted that year, codified the role of the Solicitor-General as statutory counsel, distinct from the role of the permanent secretary as the non-political public service head of the Attorney-General's department.

Two solicitors-general have been appointed to the High Court of Australia: Anthony Mason in 1972 and Stephen Gageler in 2012. Gageler is the only person to be directly elevated from the solicitor-generalship to the High Court. Bob Ellicott subsequently served on the bench of the Federal Court of Australia.

Although the Solicitor-General is essentially the deputy Attorney-General, it is a statutory role whereas the Attorney-General is a political one, filled by a member of parliament, and it is rare for a Solicitor-General to then become the Attorney-General. Bob Ellicott is the only Solicitor-General who went on to become Attorney-General.

== Role ==
The Commonwealth Solicitor-General role is required to be filled by a barrister or solicitor of a State Supreme Court or the High Court with at least five years' experience. The general consensus is that their role is primarily to advocate and independently advise the Commonwealth. The role is distinctly separate from any political role by statute in the Law Officers Act 1964 (Cth). In performing their role, the Solicitor-General must act in accordance with the rule of law and maintain independence from the executive government of the day.

The Solicitor-General specialises in matters of constitutional and public law and generally represents the Commonwealth in constitutional disputes as well as occasionally representing the Commonwealth in international litigation. Until 1979, the Solicitor-General had criminal law prosecutorial powers, but these are now held by the Director of Public Prosecutions, a separate office supported by an agency within the Attorney-General’s Department.

=== Tenure ===
The Solicitor-General is appointed on a fixed term basis, with section 6(1) of the Law Officers Act 1964 (Cth) dictating they are appointed for a term with a maximum of seven years. Although the act does not stipulate a fixed term, recently Solicitors-General have ordinarily been appointed to five year terms. In s10 the act also dictates that the Solicitor-General can only be dismissed from the role by the Governor-General as a result of illness, misbehaviour or bankruptcy. This is widely viewed as an important aspect of the Solicitor-General’s role, as it ensures they remain independent due to the security of their tenure.

=== Private practice ===
In England, the Attorney-General and Solicitor-General historically had concurrent private practices as barristers until the 1890s. By the time the Australian role was created, the convention was firmly established that the Solicitor-General would accept briefs only from the government or government business enterprises. However, in a rare departure from this rule, in 1991 the then-Solicitor-General Gavan Griffith QC was permitted to take paid leave to recommence a private practice while retaining in part his public practice as Solicitor-General, due to financial difficulties arising from involvement in underwriting insurance risks for Lloyd's of London.

== Functions ==
Within s 12 of the Law Officers Act 1964 (Cth) the functions of the Solicitor-General are prescribed. It separates the Solicitor-General’s functions into acting as counsel for the Commonwealth, ministers, government bodies and any person for which the Attorney-General seeks counsel under s 12(a) and also to provide their opinion on legal questions referred to them by the Attorney-General under s 12(b).

S 12 of the Law Officers Act has given rise to some uncertainty as to whether s 12(b) is restrictive of the conditions of s 12(a) whereby the Attorney-General is able to restrict access to the Solicitor-General for those seeking advice concerning a legal question.

In 2016 Solicitor-General Gleeson suggested that s 12(b) should not restrict s 12(a). Although, Gleeson during his term as Solicitor-General introduced Guidance Note 11, this codified a system for those in government seeking advice. This included notifying the Attorney-General of any requests for advice and the Attorney-General receiving a copy of any advice received. Gleeson did later clarify that these stipulations applied with the exception of the Prime Minister and the Governor-General seeking confidential advice.

Anthony Mason Solicitor-General between 1964–1969 had previously proposed that s 12(b) should not limit the Solicitor-General to only providing advice with the express approval of the Attorney-General. In 2016 he clarified this position by explaining that s 12(b) allows the Attorney-General to seek the legal opinion of the Solicitor-General even where this question falls out of the scope provided in s 12(a). This view was supported by Gavan Griffith, Solicitor-General between 1984–1997, who remarked that the Solicitor-General would often receive requests for advice from emanations of the Commonwealth separate from the Attorney.

Attorney-General George Brandis remarked that s 12(b) does not facilitate any capacity for anyone outside of the Attorney-General to seek advice concerning a question of law from the Solicitor-General.

Considering the inconsistency in views according to some legal opinions, Professor Gabrielle Appleby has proposed that there is need of reform of s 12 of the Law Officers Act to clarify if the Attorney-General is able to restrict access to the Solicitor-General.

== Relationship with Attorney-General ==
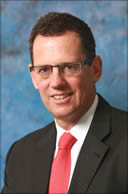
Justin Gleeson, Solicitor-General of Australia between 2013–2016.

The Solicitor-General together with the Attorney-General make up the Australian Law Officers. Legal opinion is that as Law Officers, the public would expect the government when making important decisions to have sought the opinion of and adopted the advice of the Law Officers. As the Solicitor-General is an independent and legally profound body it is expected that when legal and constitutional questions arise concerning government legislation, the Attorney General with the support of the legal opinion and advice of the Solicitor-General is to offer parliament and the public guidance.

Considering the wholly political Attorney-General at times has limited or no legal qualifications, the Solicitor-General’s role as a non-political legal advocate and advisor to parliament exists in order to complement the Attorney-General who due to their political role can generally not offer legal services to government.

Some concern arose when the role of Solicitor-General was first created concerning the lack of accountability in the position. In order to address these concerns particular prominence has been given to the Attorney-General maintaining all accountability for the actions of the Solicitor-General. Solicitor-General Gleeson in 2014 remarked that the Solicitor and Attorney-General should work together in order to be sure that the Attorney-General is adequately briefed and advised to be able to report to parliament. Gleeson commented that his particular system involved monthly reports to the Attorney-General briefing them of any requests for advice and reports of any advice provided. In 2015, Guidance Note 11 codified that all legal advice requested of the Solicitor-General and subsequently provided to be given to the Attorney-General.

=== Resignation of Solicitor-General Gleeson ===
On 7 November 2016, Solicitor-General Gleeson resigned from the post citing in his resignation letter that his relationship with Attorney-General Brandis was “irretrievably broken”.

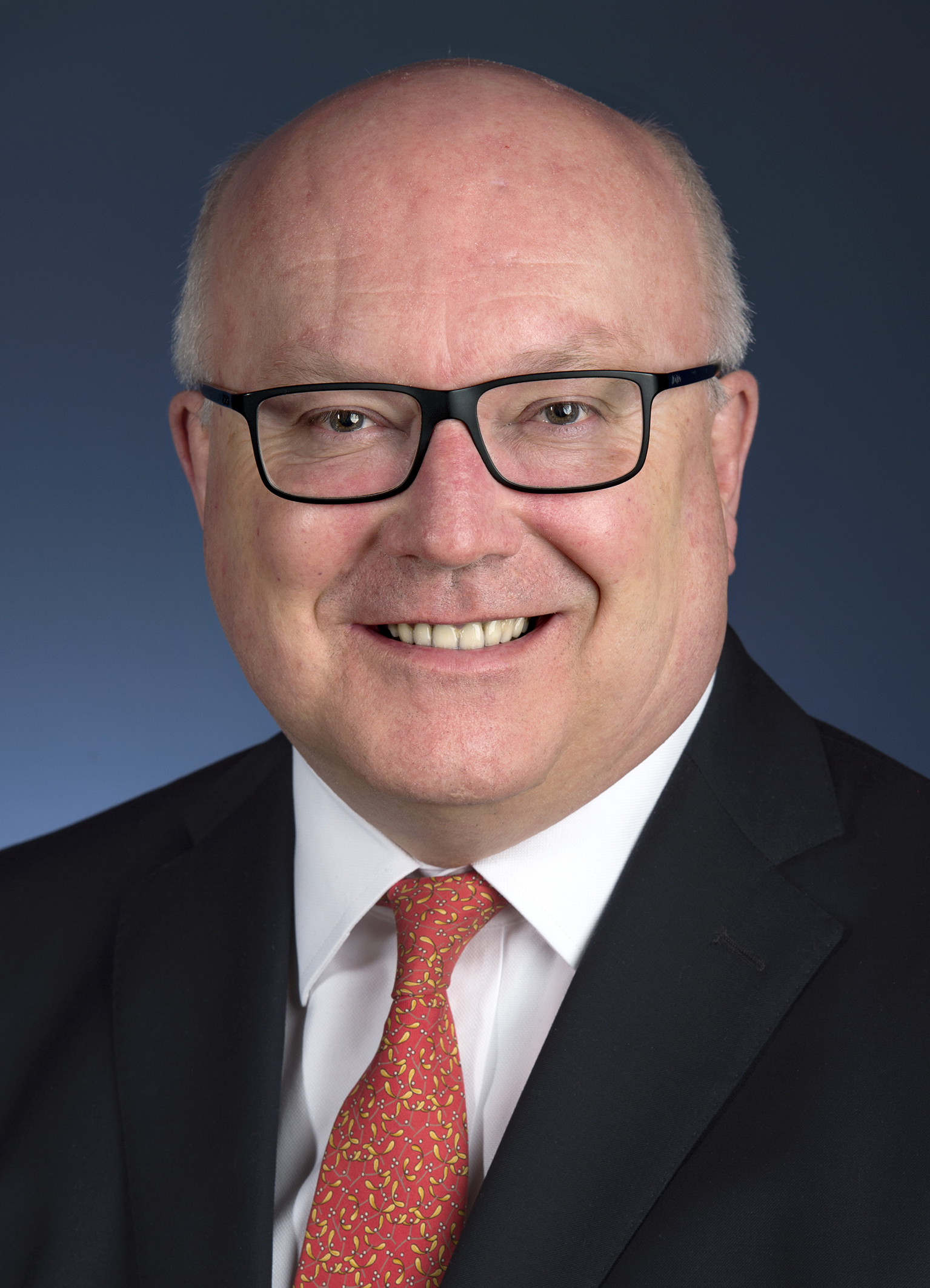
George Brandis Attorney-General of Australia between 2013–2017.

Gleeson criticised Brandis suggesting that he was not referred to on marriage equality and anti-terrorism citizenship laws.

Gleeson also is remarked as being frustrated about his opinion being misrepresented to the public. He claimed in particular that he was not consulted concerning legislation aiming to revoke the citizenship of dual nationals under anti-terror laws when it was suggested by the government he had provided advice that the legislation would succeed against a challenge in the High Court.

The general consensus however is that the central issue was Gleeson claimed to not have been consulted regarding the Legal Services Amendment (Solicitor-General Opinions) Direction 2016, which necessitated approval by the Attorney-General of any legal questions brought to the Solicitor-General for advice. Gleeson suggested this effectively blocked the Solicitor-General providing advice without the express permission of the Attorney-General which is contradictory to the independence of the role from the executive branch of government. He explained this was especially problematic in the situation where an election resulted in a hung parliament and the Governor-General sought the advice of the Solicitor-General which under the amendment would be unlawful. Brandis claimed in the Explanatory Statement of the amendment that he had in fact consulted Gleeson and sought feedback. The dispute resulted in the Senate Standing Committee on Legal and Constitutional Affairs launching an inquiry. The result of this was a majority of the Committee being in accordance with Gleeson’s perspective that Brandis did not properly consult Gleeson.

Gleeson in his resignation letter expressed that the Commonwealth is best served when the Law Officers completely trust each other and have a “mutually respectful relationship” which he described as being broken with Brandis.

== Notable Involvements ==
=== Gair Affair ===
In 1974 Labor Prime Minister Gough Whitlam offered Queensland Senator Vince Gair the position of ambassador to the Republic of Ireland and the Vatican. Whitlam is believed to have hoped that Gair’s resignation, which was required having accepted the post, would allow Labor to contest and win his vacant seat in the upcoming half-Senate election, in turn gaining a majority in the Senate. In what later became known as “The Night of Long Prawns” Queensland Premier Joh Bjelke-Petersen issued the writs for the Queensland senate seats for the half-Senate election before Gair was able to formally resign meaning that his seat would not be in contention. Solicitor-General at the time Maurice Byers offered the legal opinion that Gair was no longer a senator and had effectively resigned at either the date that the Executive Council approved the post or the date that Ireland accepted his ambassadorship. Importantly, Byers remarked that both of these dates preceded Bjelke-Petersen issuing the writs. This was responded to by the Opposition who proposed that the government had not opposed Gair being involved in Senate debates and votes at any point before the writs for the half-Senate election were issued. This matter ultimately concluded by Whitlam enacting a double dissolution nullifying the half-Senate election as all seats were in contention.

=== Case Concerning East Timor ===
In 1991, Portugal commenced international legal proceedings against Australia in the International Court of Justice concerning East Timor and submitted that Australia had failed to respect the right of the people of East Timor to self-determination. Also, that Australia had failed to respect Portugal as the Administering Power of East Timor. Gavan Griffith, the Commonwealth Solicitor-General at the time acted as agent and counsel for the Commonwealth. This case concluded with the court finding that it could not make a ruling in part as a result of Griffith on behalf of the Commonwealth submitting that the Court should also rule upon Indonesia’s actions, however, Indonesia’s absence exceeded the court’s jurisdiction.

=== Australian Parliamentary Eligibility Crisis of 2017–18 ===
In 2017–18 seven senators and members in the Parliament of Australia were deemed ineligible to be an elected member of parliament as a result of holding dual citizenship under s 44(i) of the Australian Constitution. Stephen Donaghue, Commonwealth Solicitor-General during this crisis, is widely viewed as having had an important role in offering advice to MP’s and representing MP's including appearing in court on behalf of Attorney-General Brandis. This saw him submit that five of the seven parliamentarians should not be impacted by s 44(i) as they had not voluntarily received their dual citizenship. This was denied as the court adopted the stance taken in Sykes v Cleary (1992) where the knowledge or voluntary acquisition citizenship was not relevant and as such the five parliamentarians deemed to have been citizens by the court had their seats declared vacant.

=== COVID-19 Vaccine Mandates ===
In 2021, Donaghue also provided advice to the Prime Minister Scott Morrison regarding the COVID-19 vaccine rollout in Australia, indicating that workplace COVID-19 vaccine mandates would most likely not be viewed as discriminatory. Donaghue suggested that under both state and Commonwealth law, protection is only provided for people concerning certain attributes, including gender identity and race, vaccine status however is not included. In spite of this in August 2021 Morrison expressed that the federal government will most likely not mandate vaccines.

== List of Solicitors-General ==
Name	Period in office	Alma Mater
Sir Robert Garran KCMG	1916–1932	University of Sydney
Sir George Knowles CBE	1932–1946	University of Melbourne
Sir Kenneth Bailey CBE KC	1946–1964	University of Melbourne Corpus Christi College, Oxford
Anthony Mason CBE QC	1964–1969	University of Sydney
Bob Ellicott QC	1969–1973	University of Sydney
Sir Maurice Byers CBE QC	1973–1983	University of Sydney
Gavan Griffith KC	1984–1997	University of Melbourne Magdalen College, Oxford
Henry Burmester KC (acting)	1997–1998	Australian National University
David Bennett AC KC	1998–2008	University of Sydney Harvard Law School
Stephen Gageler SC	2008–2012	Australian National University Harvard Law School
Justin Gleeson SC	2013–2016	University of Sydney University College, Oxford
Stephen Donaghue KC	2017–2025	University of Melbourne Magdalen College, Oxford
Ruth Higgins SC FAAL	2026–	University of Glasgow Balliol College, Oxford
