= Gregan McMahon =

Australian actor, theatrical director, and producer (1874–1941)

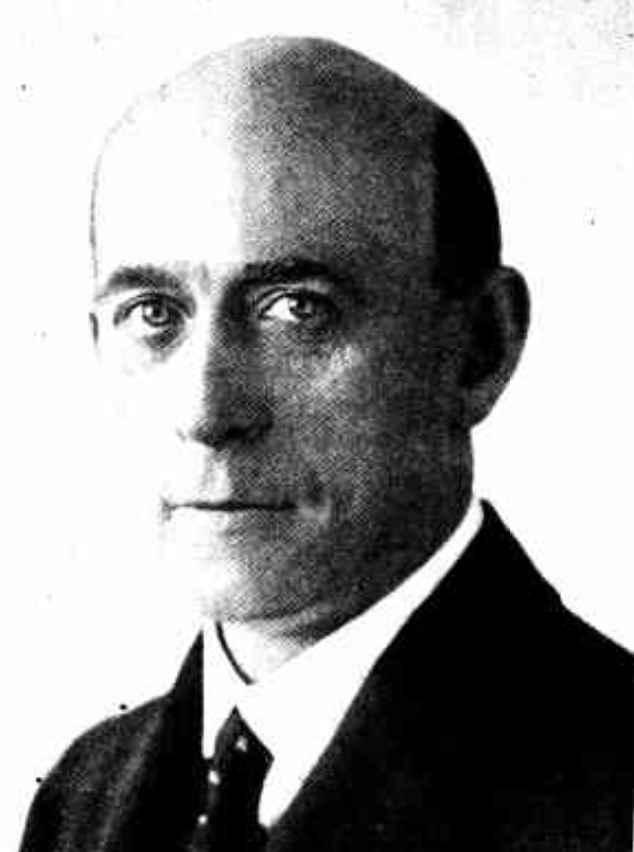
Gregan McMahon, CBE (1874-1941), Australian actor and theatrical director and producer.

Gregan McMahon, CBE (2 March 1874 – 30 August 1941) was an Australian actor and theatrical director and producer.

== Early life ==
McMahon was born in Sydney, elder son of John Terence McMahon, a clerk, and his wife Elizabeth, née Gregan. Both parents were emigrants from Ireland. McMahon was educated at Sydney Grammar School and Saint Ignatius' College, Riverview.

== Career ==
On 4 October 1899 McMahon married Mary Kate, daughter of Thomas Hungerford.

McMahon's establishment of the Melbourne Repertory Theatre Company (of which he was artistic director from 1911–1918 and 1926–1928) as an artistically and financially successful company is seen by some as the first Australian theatre company.

Among the plays McMahon produced from 1911–1917 were Candida, Getting Married, Major Barbara, The Doctor's Dilemma, Man and Superman, Fanny's First Play, You Never Can Tell, and Pygmalion, all by George Bernard Shaw; Rosmersholm and An Enemy of the People by Henrik Ibsen; The Voysey Inheritance and The Madras House by Granville Barker; The Pigeon, Strife and The Fugitive by Galsworthy; The Seagull by Anton Chekhov; The Mate by Arthur Schnitzler, and others by several by Australian authors. McMahon is also seen as having brought the techniques and approaches of the Russian and Soviet theatre practitioners like Stanislavski and Meyerhold to Australian theatre.

World War I had a significant effect on theatre and several leading actors enlisted.

With the break-up of the Sydney Repertory Theatre, the Sydney Players' Club was formed from its members, notably W. F. Jackson and S. R. Irving. Another notable alumnus was Doris Fitton, who went on to found the Independent Theatre.

He co directed the short feature The Haunted Barn (1931).

== Personal life and honours ==
McMahon was survived by his wife, Mary Hungerford McMahon, whom he had married in 1899, and a son (also named Gregan McMahon) and a daughter. He was created CBE in 1938.
