= YVG =

YVG may refer to:

- Vermilion Airport (IATA: YVG), an airport in Alberta, Canada
- Yarra Valley Grammar, an independent Anglican grammar school in Ringwood, Melbourne, Australia
