= Trinity Grammar School, Kew =

Location
- 40 Charles Street; Kew, Victoria 3101; Australia; 37°48′33″S 145°2′4″E

Information
- Type: Independent, single-sex, day school
- Motto: Latin: Viriliter Agite (Act Courageously)
- Denomination: Anglican
- Established: 1902
- Chairman: Simon Gipson
- Principal: Adrian Farrer
- Chaplain: Rev. Bryn Jones
- Employees: ~400
- Gender: Boys
- Enrolment: 1,500 (ELC–Year 12)
- Colours: Green and gold
- Affiliation: Associated Grammar Schools of Victoria
- Alumni: Old Trinity Grammarians
- Website: trinity.vic.edu.au

Trinity Grammar School, Kew (abbreviated to TGS) is an independent, Anglican day school for boys, located in Kew in Melbourne, Australia.

The school was founded at a meeting of the vestry of Holy Trinity Church, Kew on 14 November 1902. It opened in 1903, operating out of the Holy Trinity Church. Trinity is a founding member of the Associated Grammar Schools of Victoria (AGSV). The school has over 1500 students and approximately 20 boarding students. The school ceased its boarding operations at the end of 2022.

== History ==
Trinity Grammar School, Kew was founded by members of the Holy Trinity parish vestry in 1902 and opened the next year. The school started in the parish hall of Holy Trinity Church with 23 boys. Rev. Edward Taffs was the first headmaster, although Rev. G. M. Long soon succeeded him.

In 1906, the school purchased a property, "Roxeth" (now Henty House), a small distance to the south of the church, on the corner of Wellington Street and Charles Street. Trinity quickly built Arnold Hall, the first classroom block, completing it in 1907. In the same year, Trinity was registered as a public school of the Church of England. The school leased "Molina", a property on the other side of Charles Street and the site of the former Kew High School in 1908. In 1909, the school built a science laboratory beside Arnold Hall.

Two years later, Long left the school to become Bishop of Bathurst and Rev. A. W. Tonge was appointed headmaster. A second classroom building was built, now demolished to make way for the Richard and Elizabeth Tudor Centre for Contemporary Learning. In 1917 Tonge left the school to serve as an AIF chaplain and Trinity appointed a new headmaster, Frank Shann, who would lead the school for the next two and a half decades. Under his tenure, the school grew to a total of 245 boys and many buildings were built, including the now demolished War Memorial Library, the Preparatory (junior) School classroom building and the Health Pavilion. "Molina" was bought from its owner, John Henning Thompson, as was the neighbouring property, "Elsinore". The properties were subsequently renamed in 1925, "Molina" becoming Merritt House, "Elsinore" Roberts House and "Roxeth" Henty House. Frank Shann died in post in 1943.

Alfred Bright became headmaster upon Frank Shann's death. The school built a second storey for the Preparatory School in 1952, and in the following year, the Parents' and Friends' Hall, a multipurpose venue, was built between Merritt House and Xavier College. In 1959, on Alfred Bright's retirement, John Leppitt was appointed Headmaster. The school advanced greatly during his time as headmaster, the number of students reaching 812. The Robertson Science and Administration Building was opened in 1959 and extended later on, and two years later, the Junior School building was extended to almost meet Roberts House, providing art and music facilities. In 1968, the Shann Building was constructed between the Robertson Building and Arnold Hall and a new sports facility, the Cornell Gymnasium, was opened.

At the beginning of the 1970s, Trinity purchased land beside Lake Eppalock, near Bendigo, opening the Leppitt Outdoor Education Centre in 1973, named after the headmaster. In 1975, the boarding house, which had been run in Merritt House, closed after more than 60 years. The War Memorial Library was demolished in favour of a new classroom building, the three-storey Tonge Building, and the library relocated to one floor of the Shann Building. After twenty years as headmaster, John Leppitt retired in 1979. The new headmaster, Don Marles, continued the development of the school with a new swimming pool in 1980 and the renovation of the original science laboratories housed in the Shann Building, now renamed the Bright Laboratories. Merritt House, the former boarding house, was converted into a music school.

As a result of new buildings constructed over the previous two decades, the school sought further land for outdoor sports facilities. Trinity purchased land in Bulleen, near the Yarra River, and opened the Marles Playing Fields there in 1983. These facilities continue to be used today on a regular basis.

1989 saw the building of another classroom building, the now demolished Poynter Building. The tuck shop, the original canteen, was closed in 1990 and a new cafeteria opened on the ground floor of the Shann Building. Two years later, the school built a dedicated chapel for weekly services (previously, students had to attend services at Holy Trinity Church, where the school began). Don Marles retired the same year, replaced by Peter Crawley.

The school was interested in the development of curriculum and saw the possibilities being opened up in business and industry by the use of computer technology. Nearby MLC had recently introduced laptop computers for the personal use by the students as an everyday part of their learning. Trinity, under the leadership of the new headmaster, Peter Crawley, decided to introduce a similar program at Trinity from the start of 1994. However, the new program did not use the computers in the same way as had been the MLC experience. Trinity decided to use a business model and became the first school in the world to adopt the use of Microsoft Office within an educational setting. This attracted the attention of Microsoft in the US and they sent a film crew to the school to record the way the school was using the laptops. In 1995 the headmaster received a letter from Bill Gates, CEO of Microsoft, commending him for his influence on American educators in the area of the use of technology in education.

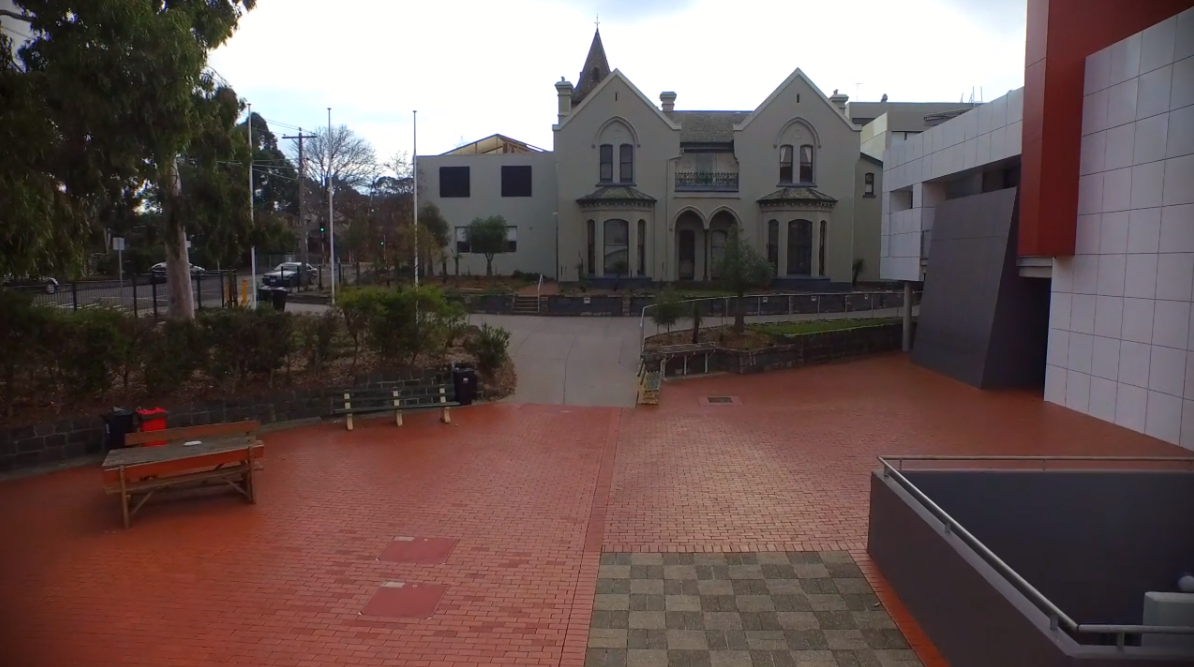
Charles Street entrance to the school, showing Henty House in the background and the Science and Technology Building on the right

In 1993, Trinity and nearby Ruyton Girls' School introduced the Coordinate Program, whereby co-educational classes for Years 11 and 12 are conducted across the two schools. In 1996, the school purchased the Kew Municipal Offices, after the City of Kew was amalgamated into the City of Boroondara, in order to further expand its facilities. Two years later, it opened as the Peter Crawley Centre for the Arts. Peter Crawley resigned in the same year accepting the position as headmaster of Knox Grammar School in Sydney. In 1999, Richard Tudor (former deputy headmaster of Melbourne Grammar School) was appointed as headmaster and the co-educational Early Learning Centre was opened.

=== 21st century ===
In 2000, a group of Trinity students instigated and organised a visit to Melbourne by Nelson Mandela. Additionally in that year, the school began using wireless technology for their computers and, in the following year, Trinity began the construction of the Science and Technology Building to replace the Bright Laboratories. This opened in 2003, the year in which Trinity celebrated its centenary year.

The school opened a new gymnasium, the Peter McIntyre Sports Centre, to complement the old Cornell Sports Gym, and another block of forested land was purchased at Licola, to complement the Outdoor Education Centre at Lake Eppalock. In 2005 the school also purchased the former Bib Stillwell car dealership showroom, on the corner of Charles Street and Cotham Road, which is currently used as a multipurpose venue, with impending development of the site in the future.

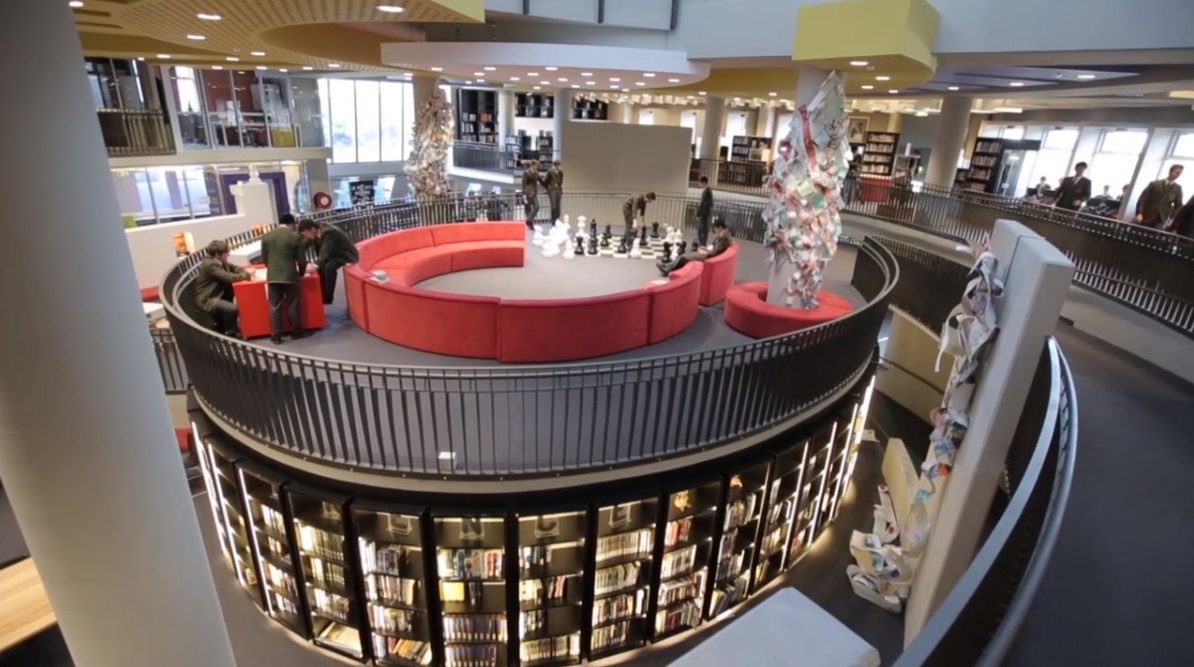
The Centre for Contemporary Learning, opened in 2013

In recent years, the school was given money to further extend and renovate the old Kew Municipal Offices. This included a junior school hall (named the South Room) and a new facade to the building. This, as nearly all new buildings, was designed by former student Peter McIntyre. The building still has heritage features with some doors saying "Kew Town Hall" and "City of Kew".

In 2011, the Poynter Building was demolished to make room for the Richard and Elizabeth Tudor Centre for Contemporary Learning. The building was opened in March 2013 by The Hon. Alex Chernov, the Governor of Victoria. It contains a multi-level library, a cafe and the Year 12 area.

Trinity has developed a reputation as a high-achieving school in the Victorian Certificate of Education (VCE) and is known for a well-balanced approach to single-sex education. In 2014, Michael Davies (former deputy headmaster of St Kevin's College) took the position of headmaster, succeeding the highly regarded Richard Tudor.

Towards the end of 2015 the school undertook the demolition of Arnold Hall (to be replaced by the Centre for Business & Social Enterprise). The new building was opened in March 2017 by The Hon. Josh Frydenberg, Federal Member for Kooyong, and includes eight classrooms as well as a lecture hall. In 2017, the Junior School introduced the International Baccalaureate Primary Years Programme (PYP). The school also introduced Cambridge University's International General Certificate of Secondary Education (IGCSE) in Years 9 and 10 English.

In November 2017, Old Trinity Grammarians' Association president David Baumgartner wrote to the school's leadership, accusing it of being too preoccupied with academic results, fundraising and building projects under Michael Davies' leadership. Baumgartner said the school needed to return to its focus on the "holistic development" and wellbeing of students. He said that there was a "resurgent undercurrent of frustration and anger" among the school community. It was revealed in 2018 that 152 staff had left the school since Davies became headmaster.

Following the dismissal of deputy headmaster Rohan Brown in March 2018, many members of the school community – including current and past students, parents and teachers – expressed extreme discontentment with the direction Michael Davies and the School Council were taking the school and demanded changes be made to the way the school operates, including the dismissal of Davies and the council. There were several large-scale protests from students regarding the dismissal of Rohan Brown. Brown was reinstated on 11 April before the commencement of Term 2 after the school's independent review showed that he was unjustly removed from his role despite breaching the school's code of conduct.

Michael Davies announced his resignation on 15 May 2018, effective from the end of Term 2. The School Council announced that Phil De Young, former principal of Carey Baptist Grammar School, would be appointed interim headmaster while a search for a new headmaster took place. Almost the entirety of the School Council was replaced following the events of Terms 1 and 2. De Young and the new School Council led a process of community consultation and reconciliation to restore the school to a state of harmony. De Young said in a speech early on: "Clearly, it's been a tough six months for the school, but that's all behind us. Let's move forward; let's do so with confidence, with passion, and let's do so in a positive way." In March 2019, Trinity announced that Adrian Farrer, principal of Cathedral College Wangaratta, would commence in 2020 as the school's 12th headmaster.

== Headmasters ==
Trinity Grammar School has had 12 principals or formerly headmasters since the school was established in 1902.

Years served	Name
1903–1904	Edward Taffs
1904–1911	George Merrick Long
1911–1917	A.W. Tonge
1917–1943	Frank Shann
1943–1959	Alfred Bright
1959–1979	John Leppitt
1979–1993	Donald Marles
1993–1999	Peter Crawley
1999–2013	Richard Tudor
2014–2018	Michael Davies
2018–2019	Phil de Young
2020–present	Adrian Farrer

== Co-curricular ==
=== House system ===
A significant part of school life is the house system. Each house is named after a notable contributor to Trinity.

Name (Senior School)	Colour	Name (Junior School)
Arnold		Summers
Cowen		Summers
Henty		Friend
Hindley		Inglis
Kent Hughes		Henderson
Merritt		Inglis
Roberts		Henderson
Sutton		Friend

About the House Patrons:

- G.C. Arnold: insurer and financier; member of School Council.
- H.O. Cowen: physician; founding member of School Council; member of Holy Trinity Church; a founder of St George's Hospital.
- A.O. Henty: solicitor, long-serving chairman of the School Council
- Archdeacon W.G. Hindley: Vicar of Holy Trinity Church; first School Council chairman.
- W. Kent Hughes: surgeon; founding member of School Council; fought in World War I.
- J.K. Merritt: importer, company director and politician; member and later chairman of School Council.
- W.J. Roberts: founding member of School Council; member of Melbourne Stock Exchange; Council member of Melbourne's Anglican diocese.
- Canon G. Sutton: Vicar of Holy Trinity Church; member and later chairman of School Council.

=== Outreach ===
Trinity is highly regarded for its outreach and social justice programs, which are organised under the aegis of Harambee (a Swahili word meaning "all together"). The program has three main ministries: East Africa, Indigenous Australians and local ministry. Activities include immersion trips to Africa and Outback Australia, working with community organisations focused on mental illness, and a variety of fundraising events for numerous causes.

=== Outdoor education ===
The Outdoor Education program includes participation in bushwalking, sailing, canoeing, kayaking, cycling, first aid, navigation, cooking and rafting. The program is compulsory for students from Year 7 to Year 10. Camps are based around school properties at Lake Eppalock, Lake Nillahcootie and Licola. Trinity also offers The Duke of Edinburgh's Award.

=== Sport ===
Trinity was a founding and is a continuing member of the Associated Grammar Schools of Victoria (AGSV).

==== AGSV premierships ====
Trinity has won the following AGSV premierships.

- Athletics (30) – 1940, 1941, 1942, 1943, 1946, 1958, 1959, 1960, 1961, 1962, 1963, 1964, 1965, 1966, 1967, 1969, 1970, 1995, 2008, 2009, 2010, 2011, 2012, 2013, 2014, 2015, 2016, 2017, 2018, 2024
- Badminton (1) – 2009
- Basketball (5) – 1996, 2000, 2001, 2006, 2010, 2026
- Cricket (17) – 1934, 1935, 1948, 1956, 1958, 1960, 1963, 1964, 1967, 1995, 1996, 1998, 2007, 2013, 2019, 2022, 2024
- Football (8) – 1935, 1945, 1946, 1948, 1949, 1969, 1976, 2012
- Hockey (10) – 1990, 2007, 2008, 2009, 2015, 2016, 2019, 2021, 2022, 2023
- Soccer (3) – 2000, 2018, 2023
- Squash (2) – 2008, 2009
- Swimming (5) – 1959, 1960, 1962, 1963, 1964
- Table Tennis (1) – 2001
- Tennis (17) – 1921, 1922, 1932, 1933, 1934, 1936, 1937, 1948, 1961, 1963, 1964, 1965, 1967, 1968, 2007, 2011, 2024
- Volleyball (5) – 2006, 2008, 2014, 2017, 2020

== Campuses ==
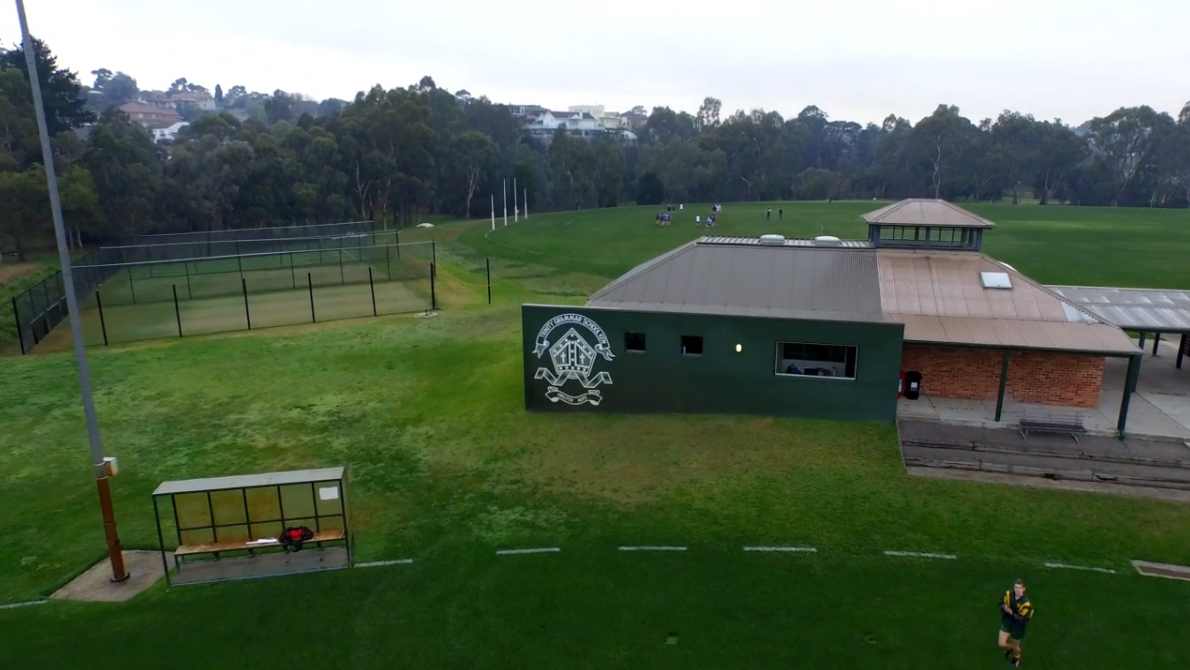
Part of Trinity's Marles Playing Fields in Bulleen

Trinity Grammar School, Kew has five campuses across Victoria. These include:

- Kew (Main Campus)
  - The main campus covers all corners of the intersection of Wellington and Charles Streets in Kew.
- Bulleen: Marles Playing Fields (Sport grounds)
- Lake Eppalock: Eppalock Outdoor Education Centre (Outdoor education)
- Licola (Outdoor education)
- Nillahcootie (Outdoor education)

== Controversies ==
In 2016, Mark Watson, a former employee of the school whose work involved caring for boarding school students, was committed to stand trial over 41 historical sex offences against five boys. The abuse is alleged to have taken place between 1975 and 1978, and is the present subject of a compensation claim.

In January 2017, the school was again brought to prominence over allegations that senior members of the school community – including Headmaster Michael Davies – knew of abuse allegations against former teacher Christopher Howell when it sent a tribute letter praising Howell's "extraordinary legacy" to the school after his death in 2016. This action, which was described as "stupid and insensitive" by lawyers representing Howell's victims, attracted a great deal of controversy to the school.

In November 2017, Old Trinity Grammarians' Association president David Baumgartner wrote to the school's leadership, accusing it of being too preoccupied with high ATARs, fundraising and building projects under Michael Davies' leadership. Baumgartner said the school needed to return to its focus on the "holistic development" and wellbeing of students. He said that there was a "resurgent undercurrent of frustration and anger" among the school community. "There is too much inward focus on things like buildings, fundraising, marketing, ATAR excellence, Cambridge schooling program, etc," Baumgartner wrote in his open letter which made its way to hundreds of parents' inboxes. He said he was also disappointed by the school's treatment of many respected and revered teachers. "The constant change of staff and the disrespectful way in which it occurs seriously concerns me," he said (it was revealed in 2018 that 152 staff had left the school since Davies became headmaster. Baumgartner, who is also a former parent at the school, warned that the school should not be run like a business and suggested that its culture would start to break down.

=== 2018 ===
In March 2018, the school council sacked deputy headmaster Rohan Brown following a disciplinary issue which the council felt was "in contravention of school policy and was also inconsistent with community expectations in this day and age". The Age revealed that the dismissal was a result of Brown cutting a student's hair on school photo day as the hair did not meet the school's appearance policy. Some members of the school community – including current and past students, teachers and parents – were outraged by his dismissal and protests (which hundreds of students took part in) subsequently occurred on school grounds.

At a meeting held by the school council to address the community (attended by in excess of 800 people), some members of the community expressed their lack of faith in the council, speculating that the circumstances regarding Brown's dismissal had political motivations and asked for the council to step down and be replaced by a democratically elected body. A large portion of the school community – including a representative of the student whose hair was cut – demanded that Brown be reinstated.

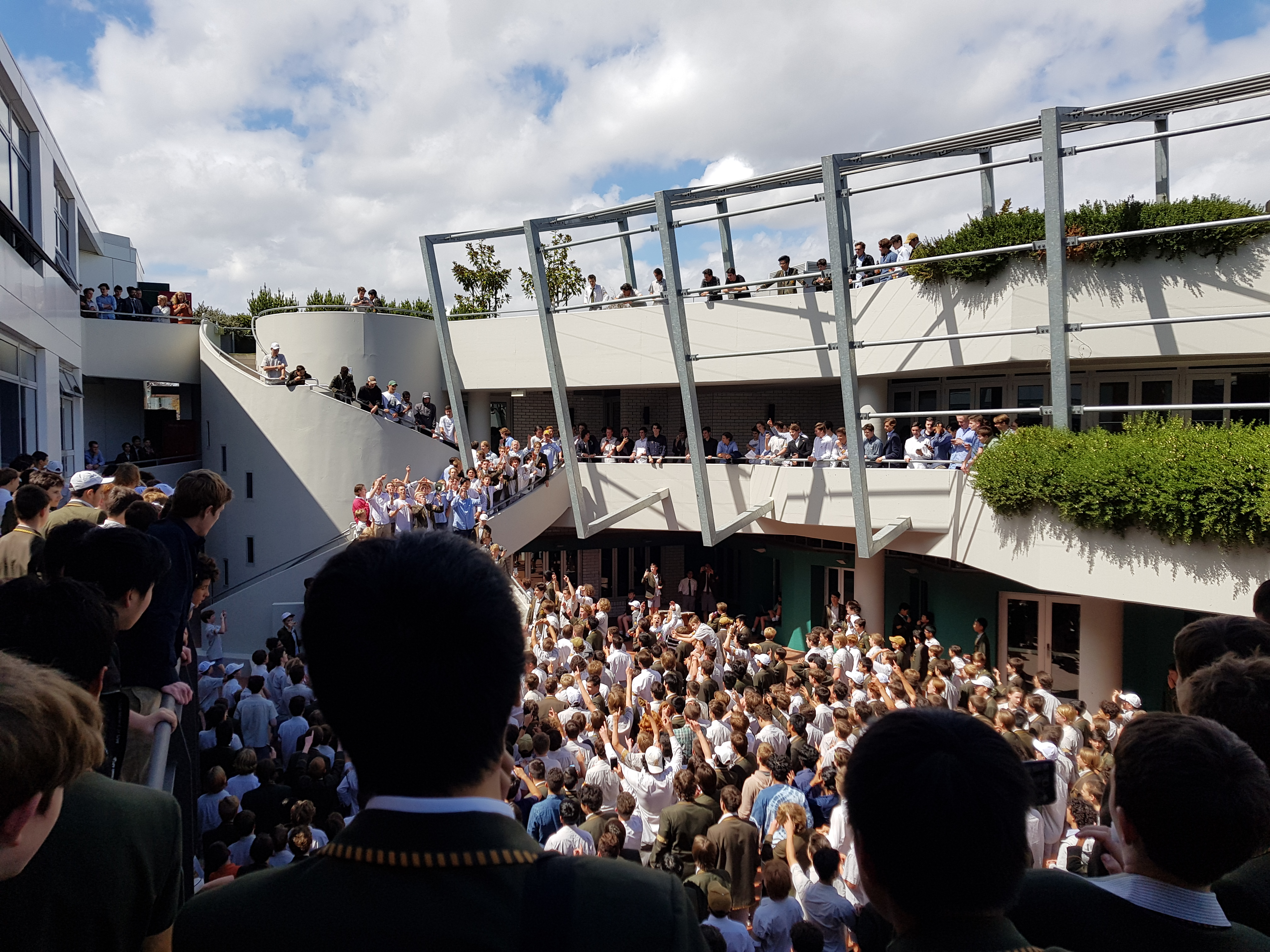
Students protests at Trinity Grammar following Rohan Brown's removal in 2018

Both Roderick Lyle (the school council chairman) and Michael Davies promised to consider the issue and reflect on the necessary actions. Following a town hall meeting of 13 March, which organisers said was attended by well over 1500 members of the school community, in addition to an online petition with over 6900 signatures, three members of the school council, including Lyle, tendered their resignations. Previous council chairman Robert Utter was installed as chairman, and an independent review of Brown's sacking was announced (led by former Federal Court judge Raymond Finkelstein QC and barrister Renee Enbom).

However, the appointment of Utter sparked only more controversy as it was viewed by many that Utter was an unacceptable choice for chairman as he was an existing council member prior to the incident, that he was partially responsible for the "cultural shift" that the school had faced in recent years, and that – after 24 years on the council – he was no longer connected with the school community. The OTGA called for Utter to resign, strongly urging an independent chairman be appointed.

Brown was reinstated on 11 April before the commencement of Term 2 after the school's independent review showed that he was unjustly removed from his role despite breaching the school's code of conduct.

Then, on 15 May, Michael Davies announced his resignation from the role of headmaster, sending out a letter stating that it came "after a great deal of thought and discussion with [his] family". He left his job at the end of term, on 29 June. The school council was almost entirely replaced on 5 June 2018. A former principal of Carey Baptist Grammar School, Phil De Young, was appointed interim headmaster until a permanent one could be found.

== Notable alumni ==
Notable alumni of Trinity Grammar School include:

- Phil Anderson, cyclist
- Hugh Beasley, AFL Footballer for the Brisbane Lions Football Club
- Harold Bolitho, Professor of Japanese history at Harvard University
- Martin Boyd, author, member of the prolific Boyd Family
- John Bunting, Australian High Commissioner to the UK
- Mark Birrell, politician
- Paul Bryce, Australian rules footballer
- Robert Percival Cook, academic and expert on cholesterol
- Tom Cutler, AFL Footballer for the Brisbane Lions and Essendon Football Clubs
- Len Darling, Australian test cricketer
- Scott Ferrier, dual Olympian in the decathlon
- Grant Fowler, Australian rules footballer
- Josh Gibson, Australian Rules footballer for the North Melbourne and Hawthorn Football Clubs
- Todd Goldstein, Australian Rules footballer for the North Melbourne Football Club
- Chris Hansen, Australian Rules footballer
- Jim Higgs, Australian test cricketer and former Australian selector
- Clyde Holding, former Victorian State Opposition Leader
- Jay Kennedy Harris, Australian Rules footballer for the Melbourne Football Club
- Wilfrid Kent Hughes, politician
- Michael Kidd, Professor of Primary Care Reform at The Australian National University
- Ian Johnson, managing director of Channel Seven, Melbourne
- Jamshid "Jumps" Khadiwhala, musician (The Cat Empire)
- Nick Larkey, AFL Footballer for the North Melbourne Football Club
- Gavin Long, academic, journalist, literary critic, military historian, and war correspondent
- David Mackay, Australian Rules footballer listed at the Adelaide Football Club
- Thomas Mayne, inventor of Milo
- Luke McDonald, AFL Footballer
- Peter McIntyre, architect
- Robert McIntyre, dual Olympian in alpine skiing
- Gabriel Ng, politician
- Albert Keith Outen, VFL footballer with Footscray and VFA footballer with Williamstown
- Scot Palmer, Australian Rules Football journalist
- Gerald Patterson, Former World Number 1 in tennis; won four grand slams including Wimbledon
- John Perceval, painter, potter, and sculptor
- Konrad Pesudovs, SHARP Professor of Optometry and Vision Science at The University of New South Wales
- Luke Power, Australian Rules footballer and co-captain for the Brisbane Lions and Greater Western Sydney Giants
- Sam Power, Australian Rules footballer for the Western Bulldogs and North Melbourne football clubs
- Peter Rowsthorn, comedy actor
- Mark Rowsthorn, businessman
- Arthur Rylah, politician and attorney-general
- Wayne Schwass, Australian Rules footballer for the North Melbourne and Sydney Swans Football Clubs
- Anthony Scott, AFL Footballer for the Western Bulldogs Football Club
- Andrew Smith, field hockey player, Olympic bronze medalist at the 2008 Summer Olympics
- Ross Stevenson, Melbourne radio presenter
- John Tickell, Australian rules footballer, doctor
- Robert Timms, businessman and founder of Robert Timms Coffee
- Adam Tomlinson, Australian Rules footballer for the Greater Western Sydney and Melbourne Football Clubs
- Dom Tyson, Australian Rules footballer for the Greater Western Sydney, Melbourne and North Melbourne Football Clubs
- Stephen Wallis, Australian Rules footballer for the Western Bulldogs Football Club
- Ray Weinberg, Olympic athlete, coach and broadcaster
- Hoa Xuande, actor
