= Margaret Dick =

Australian microbiologist

- Born: 14 September 1918; Melbourne, Australia
- Died: 25 September 2008 (aged 90); Mornington, Victoria, Australia
- Education: University of Melbourne (MSc 1955)
- Known for: Developing safe methodology for food production
- Awards: Award of Merit of the Australian Institute of Food Science and Technology
- Scientific career
- Fields: Microbiology
- Workplaces: Kraft Foods

Margaret Isabella Brownlee Dick (14 September 1918 – 25 September 2008) was a pioneering Australian microbiologist. She is best known for her role as Chief Microbiologist at Kraft Foods Australia and for the development of a methodology for safe food production. She was the first woman to be elected as a Fellow of the Australian Institute of Food Science and Technology.

== Biography ==
Dick was born in Melbourne to immigrant Scottish parents, Margaret and James Dick. She was the youngest of the four children in the family. She descended from a long line of engineers on her paternal side, including her grandfather, father and all of her uncles. Her mother was a housewife and tailor, while both of her sisters became teachers. Dick's maternal grandfather worked as an accountant.

The family moved from South Africa to Australia in 1914. Her parents decided to move to Australia due to her father's risk of miner's phthisis and the start of the Great War.

=== Education ===
Dick was educated at Kew State School, Mont Albert Central School (the leading central school in Melbourne at the time) and Melbourne Girls' High School. Her parents made financial sacrifices so that she and her siblings could attend the best schools. She graduated from the University of Melbourne in 1941 with a Bachelor of Science in Microbiology, Dietetics, and Biochemistry. Upon graduating with a bachelor's degree, she found work in a medical microbiology laboratory in Adelaide, working under the supervision of several physicians.

=== Career ===
Shortly after, Dick returned to Melbourne where she won a role with the Kraft Walker Cheese Company (later Kraft Foods) as assistant to the senior microbiologist.

While working at Kraft, she developed and introduced new microbiological methods into Australia for measuring a range of B group vitamins and amino acids. This research led to her completion of her Master of Science degree in 1955, which was awarded by the University of Melbourne.

She began working for Kraft Foods in 1942 and continued her work for them for 40 years. By 1949, she earned the title of Senior Microbiologist and eventually she would become the Chief Microbiologist for the entire company. She set the microbiology standards for all of the company's products and became an authority on bacteriophage interaction with cheese starters and the occurrence of Staphylococci in dairy products. She outlined and employed the protocols (from a microbiological perspective) for food product monitoring and equipment and employee surveillance that eventually became HACCP (Hazard Analysis by Critical Control Points) standards. She also assisted in the determination of a more effective methodology to test for penicillin in cow's milk. Her last few months of work before retirement, she helped set up a microbiology laboratory in Tanzania. According to Allen, she was an internationally revered expert in the field.

Dick served on a number of committees including:

1. Australian Dairy Produce Standards Organization
2. Australian Defense Forces Food Standards
3. NH&MRC Sub-Committee on Microbiological Food Standards
4. Standards Association of Australia.
5. Biological Advisory Committee of the National Association of Testing Authorities

She was the only person to serve on the microbiological subcommittee of the National Health and Medical Research Council food standards committee for the entire 25-year duration that it existed.

=== Final years ===
Dick never married. She died peacefully at her home in Mornington. She was survived by her niece and nephews.

== Selected publications ==
1. "The Thermal Stability of Folic (Pteroylglutamic) Acid" appeared in Immunology & Cell Biology, May 1948
2. "The Microbiological Assay of Folic Acid" appeared in the Australian Journal of Experimental Biology and Medical Science, May 1948
3. "Fermentation of Food" was presented at the Academy of Science

== Awards and recognitions ==
In 1970, she won the Australian Institute of Food Science and Technology's Award of Merit. That same year, she became their first woman fellow. She became a Fellow of the Australian Academy of Technological Sciences and Engineering in 1977. In 2001, Dick was awarded a Centenary Medal for her contributions to food science and technology.
