= Associated Grammar Schools of Victoria =

Sporting organisation in Australia

- Abbreviation: AGSV
- Formation: 1920
- Headquarters: Melbourne, Victoria, Australia
- Members: 9 member schools (12,743 students collectively); Assumption; Camberwell; Ivanhoe; Marcellin; Mentone; Peninsula; Penleigh and Essendon; Trinity; Yarra Valley
- Website: www.agsvsport.com.au

The Associated Grammar Schools of Victoria (AGSV) is a sporting association of nine independent schools in Victoria, Australia, formed in 1920. The AGSV provides interschool sporting competitions between the nine member schools in a range of sports across Summer and Winter seasons, as well as additional premiership sports. Following the end of each season, the AGSV selects top-performing students from any of the schools to compete in a representative competition against the Associated Public Schools of Victoria (APS).

During the Summer season (October to March), the AGSV coordinates competitions between the member schools in Summer sports such as Basketball, Cricket, Summer Hockey and Tennis amongst others. During the Winter season (April to August), sports played include Football, Soccer, Winter Hockey and Cross Country amongst others. In addition to the two main seasons, other premiership sports played include Swimming (February to March), Athletics (July to September) and Water Polo (July to September).

== History ==
The AGSV was founded in 1920 to provide an alternative to the Associated Public Schools of Victoria (APS). There were nine founding member schools: All Saints Grammar School, Brighton Grammar School, Camberwell Grammar School, Caulfield Grammar School, Haileybury College, Ivanhoe Grammar School, Malvern Grammar School, St Thomas College and Trinity Grammar School. In 1928, Carey Baptist Grammar School also joined the AGSV. Of these ten original schools, three (Camberwell, Ivanhoe and Trinity) are still AGSV members, four (Brighton, Carey, Caulfield and Haileybury) opted to join the APS instead in 1957, two (St Thomas with Essendon Grammar School and Malvern with Caulfield) amalgamated with other schools and one (All Saints) ceased to exist in 1925.

In 1958, Assumption College, Essendon Grammar School and Mentone Grammar School joined the AGSV. In 1964, 1965 and 1971 respectively, Marcellin College, The Peninsula School and Yarra Valley Grammar School joined the AGSV. In 1977, Essendon Grammar School amalgamated with the Penleigh Presbyterian Ladies' College to form the current Penleigh and Essendon Grammar School. Following this, there have been no changes to the membership of the AGSV (as of August 2017).

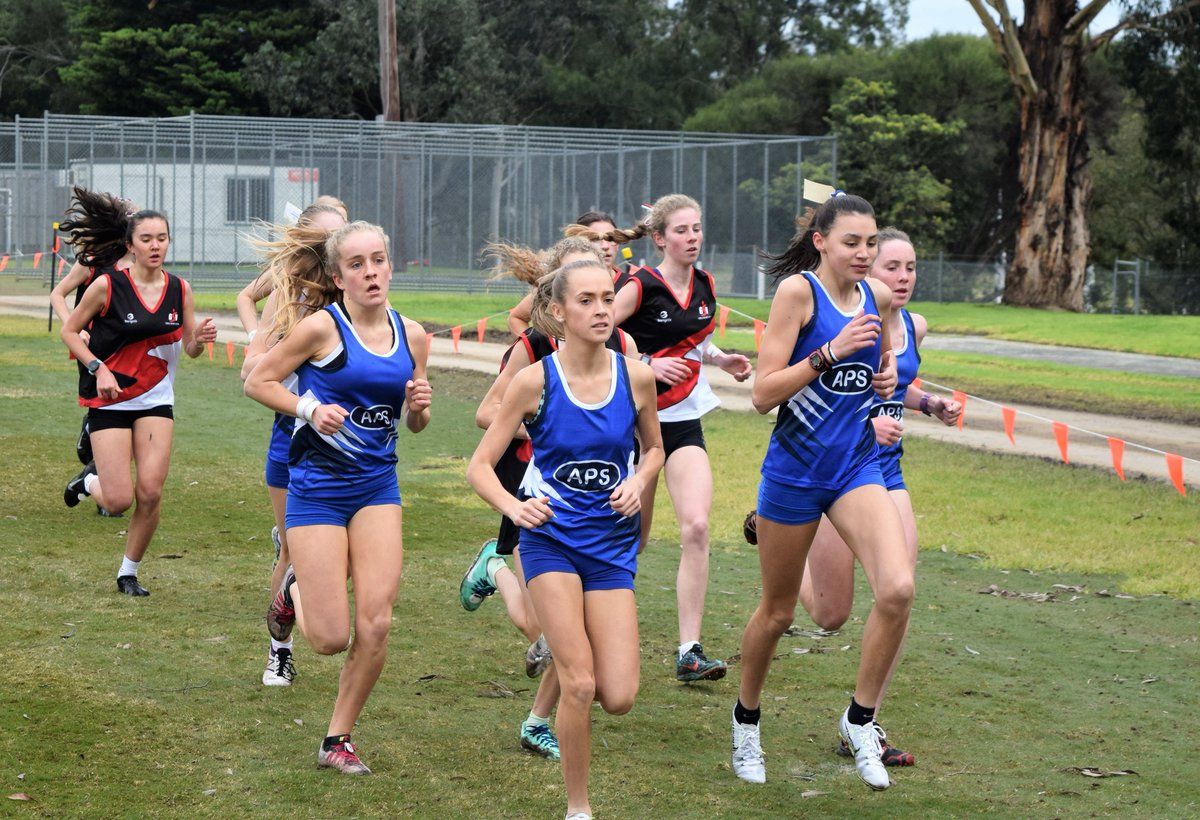
2016 AGSV/APS Girls' Representative Cross Country

The AGSV has provided annual Summer and Winter sports since its formation in 1920, as well as annual competitions in Swimming and Athletics amongst other sports.

In 1968, the AGSV and the APS established an annual Tennis competition between the best Tennis players in both associations. In 2000, this was extended to all Summer and Winter sports, and has remained an annual tradition since. Following every Summer and Winter season, the top-performing students in both the AGSV and the APS compete against each other in the annual competition between the two associations.

In 2001, the AGSV and the APS coordinated to form a combined AGSV/APS girls' sport program. This was due to the establishment of Girls Sport Victoria in 2000 after a letter was sent to principals of Melbourne Girls Grammar School, Firbank Girls' Grammar School, Genazzano FCJ College, Loreto Mandeville Hall Toorak, Presbyterian Ladies' College and Toorak College from the APS, inviting them to join their association, which they all refused. The new AGSV/APS girls' sport program was established to provide opportunities for fair competition to female students of schools from both associations. Of the twenty AGSV/APS schools, twelve are co-educational, eight are boys-only and none are girls-only. As such, most of the sporting competitions are dominated by boys and the opportunities for girls' sport are relatively limited in both associations. The AGSV/APS girls competition runs for the Summer and Winter seasons (not applying to the Athletics, Swimming or other sport that is contested outside the main seasons) and is separate from the boys competition, which remains AGSV-only.

== Schools ==
=== Current member schools ===
School	Abbreviation	Location	Principal	Enrolment	Founded	Denomination	Boys/Girls	Day/boarding	Year Entered Competition	School Colours
Assumption College	ACK	Kilmore	Kate Fogarty	1,245	1893	Roman Catholic	Boys & girls	Day & boarding	1958	Royal blue, sky blue and gold
Camberwell Grammar School	CAMB	Canterbury	Ben Jeacocke	1,304	1886	Anglican	Boys	Day	1920	Gold, navy and pale blue
Ivanhoe Grammar School	IVAN	Ivanhoe	Gerard Foley	2,168	1915	Anglican	Boys & girls	Day	1920	Brown and white
Marcellin College	MARC	Bulleen	John Hickey	1,173	1950	Roman Catholic	Boys	Day	1964	Maroon, sky blue and gold
Mentone Grammar School	MENT	Mentone	Andy Müller	2,025	1923	Anglican	Boys & girls	Day	1958	Navy, gold and white
Peninsula Grammar	PGS	Mount Eliza	Stuart Johnston	1,450	1961	Anglican	Boys & girls	Day & boarding	1965	Navy, red, gold and white
Penleigh and Essendon Grammar School ("PEGS")	PEGS	Keilor East	Kate Dullard	2,699	1871 (as Penleigh Ladies’ College) 1872 (as Essendon Grammar) 1977 (amalgamated schools)	Uniting Church	Boys & girls	Day	1958	Navy, maroon and pale blue
Trinity Grammar School, Kew	TRIN	Kew	Adrian Farrer	1,480	1902	Anglican	Boys	Day	1920	Dark green and gold
Yarra Valley Grammar School	YVG	Ringwood	Dr. Mark Merry	1,268	1966	Anglican	Boys & girls	Day	1971	Red, gold and black

== Sports ==
The Associated Grammar Schools of Victoria offer a range of sports for the member schools. Boys compete in an AGSV only competitions and girls compete in the APS/AGSV competition. these sports offered are;

Boys

- Athletics
- Australian Rules Football
- Badminton
- Basketball
- Cross Country
- Cricket
- Golf
- Hockey
- Lawn Bowls
- Rugby (VSRU)
- Soccer
- Squash (Squash Victoria)
- Swimming
- Table Tennis (Non AGSV Premiership Sport)
- Volleyball
- Waterpolo

Girls (AGSV/APS Combined)

- Athletics
- Australian Rules Football
- Badminton
- Basketball
- Cross Country
- Cricket
- Golf
- Hockey
- Lawn bowls
- Netball
- Soccer
- Softball
- Swimming
- Touch Football
- Volleyball
- Waterpolo

== Current List of Premiers ==
Sport	Boys Premiers	Girls Premiers
Athletics	Camberwell Grammar School	Mentone Grammar School
Australian Rules Football	Penleigh and Essendon Grammar School	Caulfield Grammar School (APS)
Badminton	Camberwell Grammar School	Ivanhoe Grammar School
Basketball	Marcellin College	Haileybury (APS)
Cross Country	Marcellin College	Penleigh and Essendon Grammar School
Cricket	Camberwell Grammar School	Not Awarded
Golf	Brighton Grammar School (APS)	
Hockey	Trinity Grammar School	Carey Grammar School (APS)
Lawn Bowls	Not Awarded	Not Awarded
Netball	Not Applicable	Carey Grammar School (APS)
Soccer	Marcellin College	Caulfield Grammar School (APS)
Softball	Not Applicable	Haileybury (APS)
Swimming	Camberwell Grammar School	Ivanhoe Grammar School
Touch Football	Not Applicable	Caulfield Grammar School (APS)
Tennis	Camberwell Grammar School	Wesley College (APS)
Volleyball	Mentone Grammar School	Ivanhoe Grammar School
Waterpolo	Not Awarded	Not Awarded

List of 2023 Premiers

== List of Premierships by Schools 1990 Onwards ==
Number of Boys Premierships
Sport	ACK	CAMB	IVAN	MARC	MENT	PGS	PEGS	TRIN	YVG
Athletics	0	2	11	1	1	4	0	12	0
Australian Rules Football	14	0	1	6	0	0	13	1	0
Badminton	0	22	3	0	0	0	1	1	0
Basketball	0	0	7	19	0	1	0	5	2
Cross Country	0	0	9	24	0	1	0	0	0
Cricket	5	4	3	5	5	2	3	6	2
Hockey	0	21	2	0	0	1	2	10	1
Soccer	0	0	2	13	1	0	13	1	0
Swimming	0	3	15	0	15	0	0	0	0
Tennis	0	4	0	1	5	9	8	1	2
Volleyball	0	1	2	1	4	3	0	4	16

List as of the end of 2023

Note: Cricket allowed for co premiers until 2010

== AGSV Representative titles ==
The AGSV play one off Representative games against APS whereby the best students from each competition play against one another

2024 Results
Sport	Boys Result	Girls Result
Australian Rules Football	AGSV 8.9.57 Def By APS 13.13.91	AGSV 4.4.28 DRAW APS 4.4.28
Badminton	AGSV 6.14.458 Def APS 6.13.472	Not Applicable
Basketball	AGSV 57 Def By APS 71	AGSV 46 Def By APS 67
Cricket	AGSV 10-180 Def By APS 4-182	Not Applicable
Cross Country	AGSV 138 Def By APS 78	AGSV 51 Def By APS 32
Hockey	AGSV 4 Def By APS 6	AGSV 3 Def APS 0
Netball	Not Applicable	AGSV 36 Def By APS 66
Soccer	AGSV 4 Def APS 3	AGSV 6 Def APS 4
Softball	Not Applicable	AGSV 8 Def By APS 9
Table Tennis	AGSV 11-41 Def APS 9-37	
Tennis	AGSV 4-86 Def By APS 12/118	AGSV 7-93 Def By APS 9-103
Volleyball	AGSV 3 Def APS 2	AGSV 0 Def By APS 3

== See also ==
- List of schools in Victoria, Australia
