= Keith Farrer =

Australian food scientist and historian (1916–2012)

The Reverend Keith Farrer OBE FRSA FRACI FTSE FRSC FAIFST FIFST
- Born: Keith Thomas Henry Farrer; 28 March 1916; Footscray, Victoria, Australia
- Died: 6 June 2012 (aged 96); Croydon, Victoria, Australia
- Occupations: Chemist; food scientist; researcher; historian
- Spouse(s): Gwen Farrer (m. 1940; died 1968) Marilyn Farrer (m. 1971; died 2012)

Academic background
- Education: Hobart High School; Carey Baptist Grammar School; University of Melbourne; La Trobe University

Academic work
- Discipline: Food science
- Sub-discipline: Vitamins and heat processing
- Institutions: Kraft Foods
- Notable works: Vitamin B1 in Vegemite

Keith Thomas Henry Farrer (28 March 1916 – 6 June 2012) was a chemist, food scientist and historian who was the Chief Scientist of Kraft Foods Limited in Melbourne between 1976 and 1981.

== Early life and education ==
Farrer was born in Footscray in Melbourne but soon left to live in Hobart in Tasmania. He was first educated at Hobart High School, however after receiving a scholarship in 1930, he left to finish his high school studies at Carey Baptist Grammar School, becoming a school prefect and matriculating in 1933.

Afterwards, he completed a Bachelor of Science (BSc) and a Master of Science (MSc) in 1937 and 1938 respectively at the University of Melbourne. This culminated in 1938 when he joined Kraft Foods Ltd as a research chemist.

== Career ==
Later on, Farrer would go on to support the process in Vegemite, regarding Vitamin B1 (Thiamine) and its associated nutrients. Progressively, he climbed the ranks of the organisation to become senior research chemist between 1944 and 1949, and then Manager of Research and Development (R&D) between 1949 and 1976. Finally, he became Chief Scientist of the company between 1976 and 1981. Farrer later worked in the United Kingdom in the period of 1987 and 2001, where he documented about food additives and other research.

He would also join the Monash University Council, the University of Melbourne Council and other organisations, including the Commonwealth Scientific and Industrial Research Organisation (CSIRO). Later on in life, Farrer would be awarded an honorary doctorate (DSc) in 1954 by the University of Melbourne, and would also complete a Master of Arts (MA) at La Trobe University in 1977, due to his interest in environmental history, particularly about William Carey's botanical advances.

== Honours and fellowships ==
His support not only was at Carey but also in his many academic and research organisations including being a foundational fellow of the Australian Academy of Technology and Science (FTSE) in 1975. In addition to this, Farrer was also a fellow of many other scientific organisations that included; the International Academy of Food Science and Technology, the Royal Society of Chemistry (FRSC), the Royal Australian Chemical Institute (FRACI), the Australian Institute of Food Science and Technology (FAIFST) (of which he was a co-founder in 1967 amongst others), the Institute of Food Science & Technology (FIFST), and the Royal Society of Arts (FRSA).

Farrer was honoured with an Officer of the Order of the British Empire (OBE) in recognition of his service to science and industry in the 1978 New Year Honours List.

== Voluntary contributions ==
In addition to this work, he was also a member of the Baptist Church and the Baptist Union of Victoria (BUV), in which he became a deacon at the Collins Street Baptist Church for over 25 years, as well as being a founding member of the Whitley Baptist Theological College in Melbourne.

However, his support for his former school, Carey, was unquestioned with his 45-year stint on the School Council (board) and further to this, his terms as secretary and vice-president of the council. Subsequently, this led to Farrer House on the school campus being named in his honour in addition to being awarded the ‘Carey Medal’ in 2009 for his services to the school community.

Farrer died in June 2012 at the age of 96 in Croydon, a suburb of Melbourne.

== Selected works ==
Farrer published eight books over the course of his life and up to 140 academic papers:

=== Books ===
- Farrer, Keith (2005). William Carey – Missionary and Botanist. Carey Baptist Grammar School. ISBN 9780646452807.
- Farrer, Keith (2005). To Feed a Nation: a History of Australian Food Science and Technology. CSIRO Publishing. ISBN 9780643091542.
- Farrer, Keith (1990). The Shipment of Edible Oils. IBC Technical Services. ISBN 9781852711207.
- Farrer, Keith (1987). A Guide to Food Additives and Contaminants. Parthenon Publishing Group. ISBN 9780940813113.
- Farrer, Keith (1986). AIRG – the First Twenty Years. Australian Industrial Research Group. ISBN 9780959518917.
- Farrer, Keith (1983). Fancy Eating That!: a Closer Look at Food Additives and Contaminants. Melbourne University Publishing. ISBN 978-0522842432.
- Farrer, Keith (1980). A Settlement Amply Supplied: Food Technology in Nineteenth Century Australia. Melbourne University Publishing. ISBN 9780522841978.
