= Andrew Moore (Australian footballer) =

Australian rules footballer (born 1991)

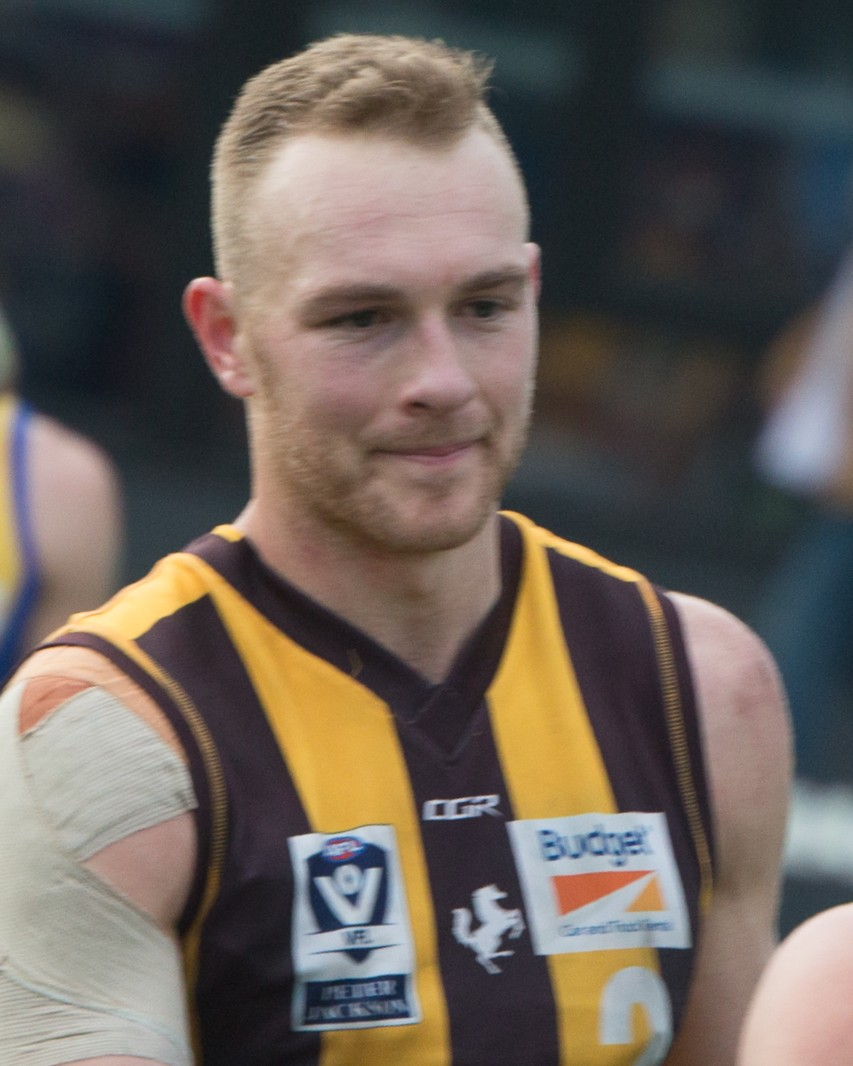
- Moore in September 2018

Personal information
- Full name: Andrew Moore
- Born: 30 May 1991 (age 35)
- Original team: Eastern Ranges (TAC Cup)
- Draft: No. 9, 2009 National Draft, Port Adelaide
- Height: 190 cm (6 ft 3 in)
- Weight: 88 kg (194 lb)
- Position: Midfielder

Playing career^{1}
Years	Club	Games (Goals)
2010–2015	Port Adelaide	55 (18)
2016	Richmond	5 (1)
Total		60 (19)
- ^{1} Playing statistics correct to the end of 2016.

Career highlights
- VFL premiership player: 2018; VFL Team of the Year: 2017

Andrew Moore (born 30 May 1991) is an Australian rules footballer who currently plays for the North Adelaide Football Club in the South Australian National Football League (SANFL). He previously played for Port Adelaide Football Club and Richmond Football Club in the Australian Football League (AFL).

== AFL career ==
Moore was one of three Port Adelaide players drafted in the first round in the 2009 AFL draft, at selection nine. He is a versatile midfielder/forward who is very capable overhead. He wins a lot of his own footy consistently and makes good decisions. A Vic Metro representative in 2009, he topped the running vertical jump with 85 cm at Draft Camp and also impressively scored 2.97 seconds for the 20m sprint and 14.1 in the beep test. He averaged 20 disposals at 74 percent efficiency for the Eastern Ranges in the TAC Cup in 2009. He attended Yarra Valley Grammar School, completing year 12 in 2009.

He is the younger brother of Richmond's Kelvin Moore.

Moore debuted in the opening round of the 2010 AFL season with four marks and 14 disposals against North Melbourne at AAMI Stadium.

In October 2015, Moore was delisted by Port Adelaide. He was recruited by Richmond as a delisted free agent in November. He was delisted by Richmond at the conclusion of the 2016 season after playing five games for the club.

== Post AFL ==
On 8 December 2016, Moore joined the Box Hill Hawks in the VFL. He was named as an on-baller on the VFL's Team of the Year while playing for the club in 2017. He was club captain for Box Hill's premiership year of 2018.

In late 2019, Moore signed with SANFL club North Adelaide, and has since become a critical part of the Roosters' midfield unit.

== Honours and achievements ==
Team

- VFL premiership: 2018

Individual

- VFL team of the year: 2017
