= Robert Timms =

Australian entrepreneur and businessman

- Born: 1908; Hobart, Tasmania
- Died: 1993 (84-85)
- Occupations: Entrepreneur and businessman
- Years active: 1939-?

Robert Timms (1908 – 1993) was an Australian entrepreneur and businessman.

== Early life ==
Born in Hobart, Tasmania in 1908, Timms was educated at Trinity Grammar School, Victoria. At the age of 15 he began working as a grocery apprentice boy at Moran and Cato, a store his father managed. He showed great sales talent and eventually his commissions from sales of tea and coffee made him the highest paid employee in the company.

== Career ==
After his father retired from the company in 1937, Timms resigned and used the funds from shares he had acquired to purchase the Associated Tea Company. In 1939, J.A.D. Gibson bought Associated Tea Company, renamed it the Victorian Branch of Gibson Tea Pty. Ltd., and invited Timms to stay on as Sales Manager.

After the outbreak of World War II, Gibson realised wartime conditions and restrictions would make running the Victorian business from Sydney difficult and offered to sell the company back to Timms. Timms accepted and throughout the war he and his employees worked up to 20-hour days to meet demands to provide Australian and American servicemen with adequate supplies of fresh coffee. During this time Timms was responsible for setting up the very first automated line of fresh coffee making in Australia.

In 1951, the company's name was changed to Robert Timms Pty. Ltd. After wartime restrictions were released, the company quickly grew from a Victorian company to a national one. Several important contracts were signed in the 1950s, most notably as the official supplier of coffee for the 1956 Melbourne Olympic Games and a contract with Ansett Airlines which required the development of a special blend of coffee for Queen Elizabeth II. This blend, the "Royal Blend," remains one of the most popular blends of coffee ever created in Australia.

In the late 1950s Timms introduced self-service coffee grinders into Australian supermarkets. This was seen as an innovative development. Demand for Robert Timms coffee quickly out-stripped supplies and the company opened new plants in Hobart and Brisbane.

In 1964, Timms went to New Guinea to inspect coffee planting and production plants which had commenced after World War II. He was so impressed that he became the largest exporter of coffee beans from that country. He then launched his first gourmet blend, "New Guinea Gold". This blend became, and remains, a best seller in Australia.

During the 1960s, vacuum sealed packaged American and European coffee became popular in Australia. Timms responded by exporting soluble New Guinea Gold to both the United States and Europe. The Department of Trade awarded him the Gold Medal Export Award for his efforts.

By 1967, Timms noted the potential in the Australian tea market and negotiated an agreement with the Tetley Tea Company of the United Kingdom. By 1969, with more than 75% of the market share, Robert Timms Pty Ltd was the largest privately owned Australian tea and coffee company. At the height of the company's success, Timms took the opportunity to retire, selling the company to Bechumut Squib, owners of the Tetley Tea Company.

Robert Timms coffee is one of the few Australian companies which still blends and roasts its coffee in Australia.

== Death ==
Robert Timms died in 1993 and is survived by one daughter and one grandson.
