= Grant Fowler =

Australian rules footballer

Personal information
- Full name: Grant Fowler
- Born: 12 March 1957 (age 69)
- Original team: Trinity Grammar
- Height: 180 cm (5 ft 11 in)
- Weight: 74 kg (163 lb)

Playing career^{1}
Years	Club	Games (Goals)
1976–1979	Fitzroy	35 (31)
1980–1983	Essendon	63 (49)
1983–1984	Hawthorn	2 (0)
Total		100 (80)
- ^{1} Playing statistics correct to the end of 1984.

Grant Fowler (born 12 March 1957) is a former Australian rules footballer who played with Fitzroy, Essendon and Hawthorn in the Victorian Football League (VFL).

From Trinity Grammar originally, Fowler made his league debut as a 19-year-old in the 1976 VFL season. A rover, he kicked 18 goals from 12 appearances in 1977.

He made his way to Essendon in 1980 and was a regular member of the team in his first three seasons, which included participation in a night premiership.

Fowler briefly retired in 1983 due to his work commitments and saw out the season at Hawthorn after getting a clearance late in the year. He added just one further game in 1984, his 100th VFL appearance.
