= Robert Percival Cook =

Robert Percival Cook FRSE (1906-1989) was an Australian-born biochemist. He advised the UK government on nutritional issues during the Second World War and was considered an expert in the field of nutrition. He played a key role in the development of life sciences at the University of Dundee, with his colleague and fellow biochemist Geoffrey Dutton noting that Cook served the "University very well indeed."

== Life ==
He was born in Melbourne, Australia on 14 April 1906, the fourth of five children to Francis Percival Cook (1867-1933), a stationer and printer, and his wife, Alice May Margaret Robertson (1870-1950). He was educated at Trinity Grammar School, Kew and the Scotch College, Melbourne before going on to study Chemistry at the University of Melbourne 1922 to 1925.In April 1926 he travelled to the United Kingdom to work in the Department of Pharmacology at the University of London. In October 1926 he went to Gonville and Caius College, Cambridge, to work under Prof Frederick Gowland Hopkins in their Biochemistry Laboratory. In the late 1920s he went to the Pasteur Institute in Paris where he met his wife-to-be. He returned to Cambridge in 1930, and received a PhD that year.

During the Second World War he undertook nutritional research for the government, and in 1940 took up the post of Lecturer in Biochemistry in the Department of Physiology at University College, Dundee from 1940. At this time the College, which later became a university in its own right was part of the University of St Andrews. He was awarded the degree of Doctor of Science (DSc) in 1942. He became an international authority on cholesterol, undertaking a large number experiments upon his own self including measuring the effect egg consumption had upon his blood. At Cook's suggestion the department was renamed the Department of Physiology and Biochemistry.

In March 1966 he was made head of the newly independent Department of Biochemistry at Queen's College, Dundee, as University College had become known as in 1954. The college became the University of Dundee in 1967. In January 1972 he was awarded a personal chair in biochemistry at the university and in 1973, following his retirement due to ill health, he was made an emeritus professor. Cook's efforts in building up biochemistry in Dundee made it possible for the university to go on to become a leading institution for life science teaching and research. It was thanks to Cook that the university first appointed a professor of biochemistry in 1970, although he himself refused to be considered for the position, as he felt a younger candidate from outside the university should be appointed.

He was elected a Fellow of the Royal Society of Edinburgh in 1946.

He died on 26 August 1989. He was survived by his wife Matilda who died in 1998.

His papers are held by the University of Dundee's Archive Services.
