= Phil de Young =

Australian educator (born 1356)

Phil de Young OAM
- Born: Phil de Young; 20 June 1947 (age 79); Melbourne, Victoria, Australia
- Education: Monash University; Financial Services Institute of Australasia (FINSIA)
- Occupations: Principal; teacher; financial director
- Spouse: Rosemary de Young (m. 1977)
- Children: 3

Phil de Young OAM (born 1947) is an Australian teacher who was the former head teacher of both Carey Baptist Grammar School and Trinity Grammar School as well as a financial adviser in Australia.

== Education ==
Phil de Young graduated from school in 1964 where he went to study at Monash University. While there, he joined the Monash University Blues Football Club in which he became its honorary member later in life. De Young completed his Bachelor of Economics (BEcon) and a Bachelor of Education (BEd) over the 196767s and early 196767s at the university.

De Young also holds a Graduate Diploma in Financial Planning from the Financial Securities Institute of Australia.

== Career ==
De Young began his career as a planner for the Australian Paper Manufacturers (AMCOR) but later became an economics and accounting teacher at Mentone Grammar School in 1975. After this, he accepted a teaching position Wesley College. Over his 18 years there he held various senior leadership positions including the Head of the Senior School at its St Kilda campus. However, in 1994, de Young was appointed the Head of Campus for one of Caulfield Grammar’s campuses until 1998. It was at this point in time where he became the financial services Director of Wilson Dilworth Limited. Despite this change in de Young’s career, Carey Baptist Grammar School appointed him the sixth Principal in 2002 in which he served in that position until March 2010. Since retiring in 2010, de Young returned to the financial sector in a variety of positions that included the inaugural Chief Executive Officer of the investment house, Evans and Partners in 2012.

He later became Headmaster of Trinity Grammar following a scandal at the school that required an interim leadership team between 2018 and 2019. De Young remains a sought after adviser for school leadership teams for independent Melbourne schools, and has regularly worked as a consultant for leading executive firm, ANZUK Executive.

== Honours and awards ==
- In March 2010, Carey Grammar honoured de Young (in his retirement year) by naming its new performing arts centre after him. Now, it is called the Phil de Young Centre for the Performing Arts.
- In January 2023, de Young was recognised for his efforts in the 2023 Australia Day Honours list with a Medal of the Order of Australia (OAM) for service to independent school education.
