= Thomas Mayne (inventor) =

Australian industrial chemist (1901–1995)

- Born: 25 December 1901; Fosterville, Victoria, Australia
- Died: 25 January 1995 (aged 93); Sydney, New South Wales, Australia
- Education: Trinity Grammar School, Kew
- Occupation: Industrial chemist
- Known for: Inventor of Milo

Thomas Mayne (25 December 1901 – 25 January 1995) was an Australian industrial chemist. He was also a food researcher and the inventor of Milo, the powdered chocolate-malt drink. In 1934, Mayne developed Milo and launched it at the Sydney Royal Easter Show. Milo began production at the plant located in Smithtown, New South Wales.

The name was derived from the famous ancient athlete Milo of Croton, after his legendary strength. Mayne himself enjoyed a hot cup of Milo every night till his death at age 93.

Mayne was an alumnus of Trinity Grammar School in Melbourne.
