= Yarra Valley Grammar =

Yarra Valley Grammar School

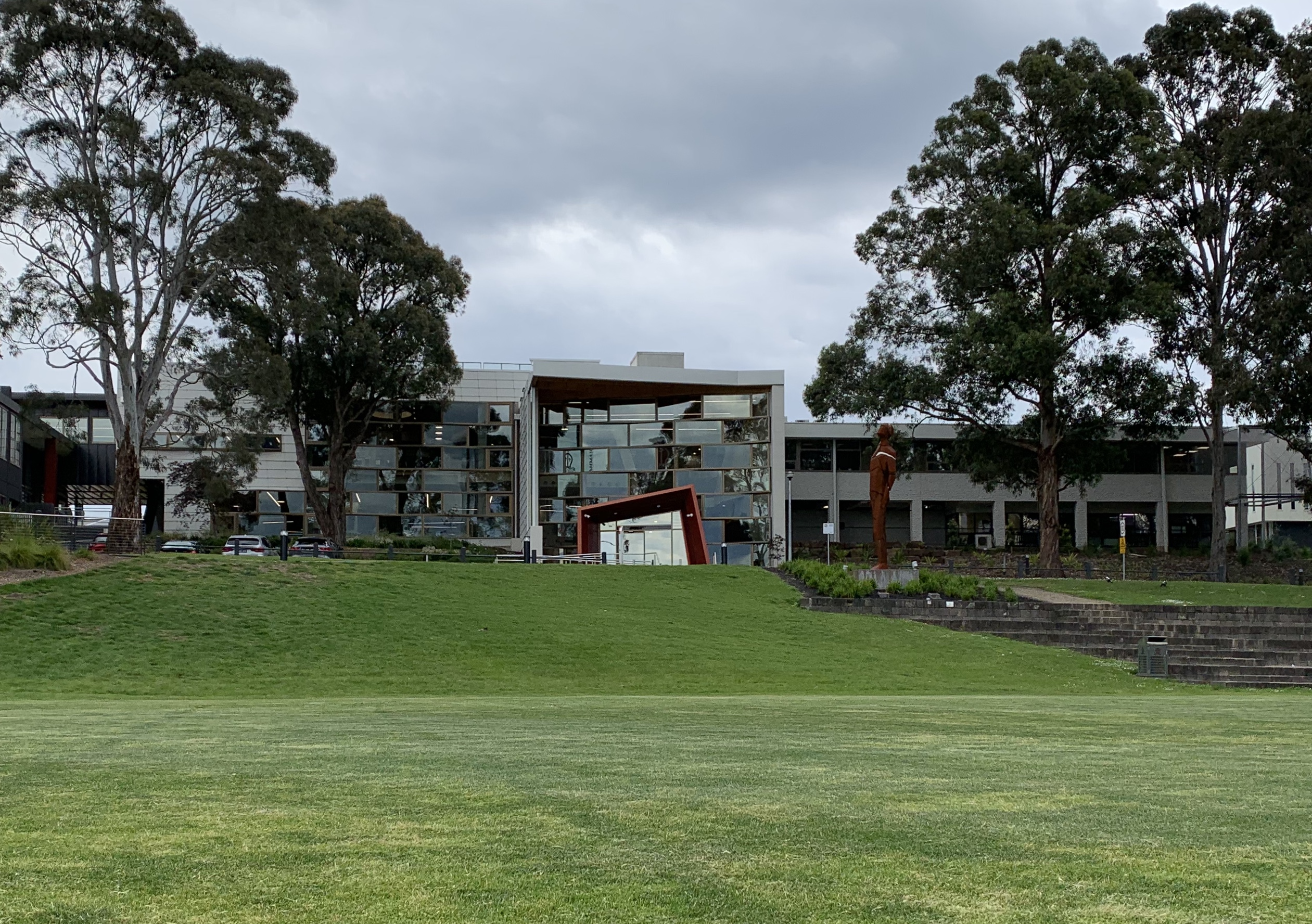
- Main School Building

Location
- Ringwood, Victoria; Australia; 37°47′1″S 145°15′36″E

Information
- Type: Independent, co-educational
- Motto: Latin: Levavi Oculos (I lift up my eyes)
- Denomination: Anglican
- Established: 8 February 1966; 60 years ago
- Chairman: Carrie Edwards-Britt
- Principal: Dr Amy Van Arkkels
- Chaplain: Rev. Paul Joy; Rev. Candice Mitrousis
- Grades: K–12
- Gender: Co-educational
- Enrolment: 1899
- Campus size: 30 Hectares
- Campus type: Suburban
- Houses: Annells; Arnott; Hughes; Plummer; Vick; Tipping; Hirst; Edwards
- Colours: Red, gold & black
- Slogan: Confidence to Achieve
- Newspaper: Valley Voice; The Link
- Yearbook: Levavi
- Endowment: $80 million
- Tuition: $28,593
- Affiliation: Associated Grammar Schools of Victoria
- Alumni: Yarra Old Grammarians
- Website: yvg.vic.edu.au

Yarra Valley Grammar School (YVG) is a private co-educational Anglican grammar school, located in Ringwood, a north-eastern suburb of Melbourne, Australia. Yarra Valley was founded as an Anglican day school for boys in 1966, before transitioning to a co-educational model in 1978. The Principal of the School is Dr Amy Van Arkkels. The school is a member of AGSV (Associated Grammar Schools of Victoria), and has been periodically ranked amongst the top 50 schools in the state according to VCE and ATAR results, being placed 21st in Victoria in 2025.

Yarra Valley Grammar has also produced notable alumni in the areas of sport, politics and academia, including seventeen professional AFL players, four olympians and two Victorian supreme court judges.

== History ==
The idea of a new school for boys in Melbourne's outer eastern suburbs was conceived in 1963 by a group of locals who recognised the need for a school closer to home for their sons. One of these locals was Robin Clarke who noticed that the nearest preparatory school that would accept his son was in Kew. This prompted Clarke to establish the School Formative Committee with 16 local businessmen and community leaders to outline the idea and premise for a new school in the east.

The school was officially established in 1966 as the Yarra Valley Church of England School for boys. John Pascoe was the first headmaster and John Harper became the first president of the new Yarra Valley Anglican School Council. The first assembly took place with 135 boys in attendance.

In 1970, the school was invited to become a member of the Associated Grammar Schools of Victoria. In 1972, Yarra Valley Anglican School established the first hearing unit for profoundly deaf students in Victoria. Girls were admitted to the two senior levels in 1978, and the school progressively became fully co-educational from 1993 through 1995.

In 1999, the school officially changed its name to Yarra Valley Grammar. In 2009, Mark Merry became principal, taking over from Neville Lyngcoln. In the same year, a new early learning centre was opened.

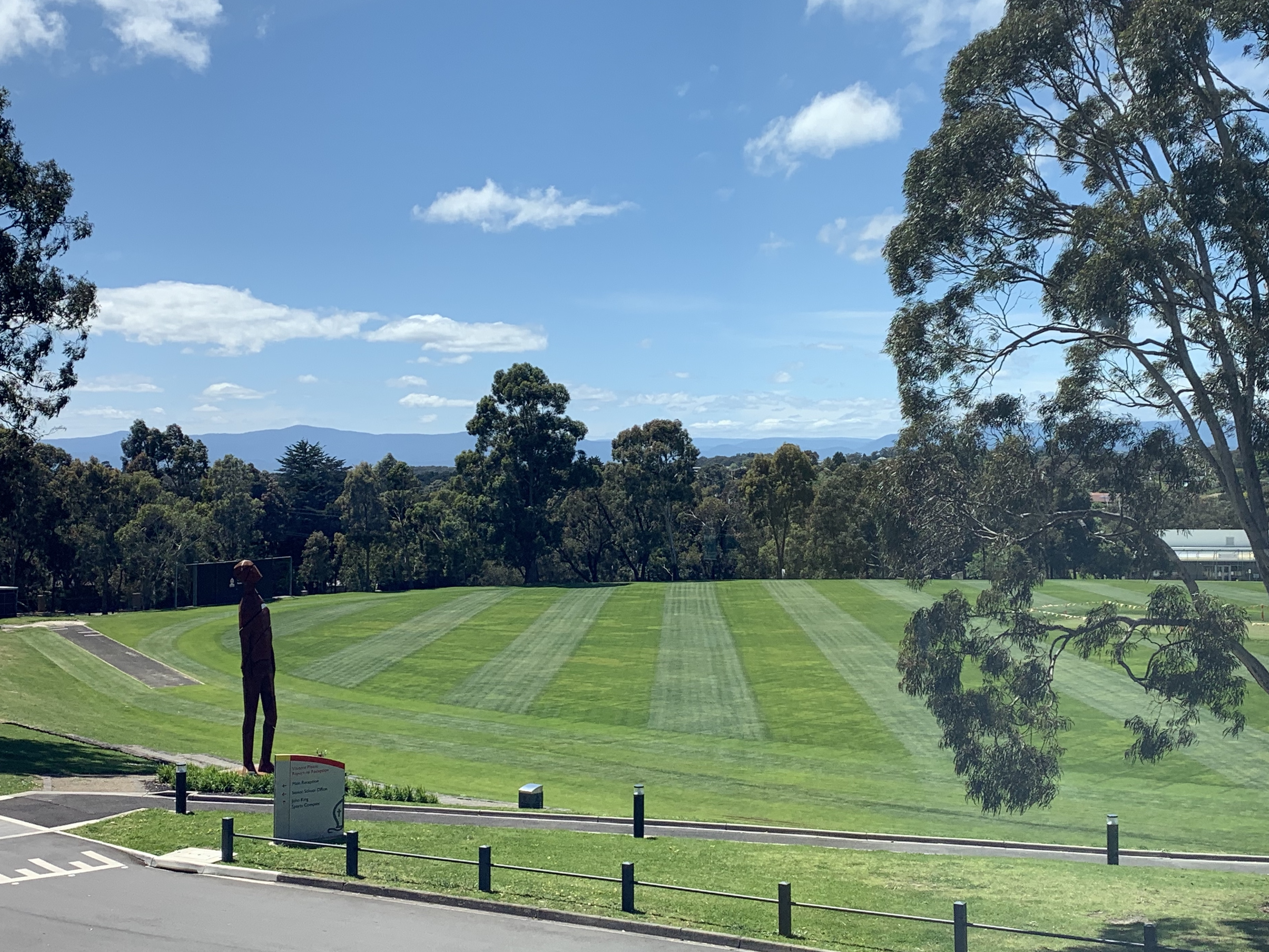
Yarra Valley Grammar School northern sporting field, October 2020

In 2011, the foundation hall and a new upper primary building were opened. In 2012, an electrical fire destroyed the science, mathematics and laboratory buildings. In 2015, a new science and mathematics building was opened. In 2017, the school's outdoor pool was demolished and replaced with an expanded drama facilities, including a new classroom and three music rooms. In later 2017 a new indoor aquatic centre was opened in partnership with Paul Sadler Swimland. In 2019, a new research centre, library and chapel were also built. In 2021, a new fine arts building was opened. And in 2023, a new Junior Primary Building was opened. In 2025 The Dr Mark Merry Performing Arts and Media School was opened.

In May 2024, two male students were suspended from the school after creating a tier list that classified female students as "wifeys", "cuties", "mid", "object", "get out" or "unrapable". A complaint was made to Victoria Police over the incident, and the two students were expelled from the school.

Following Mark Merry's retirement at the end of 2025, the school chose Dr Amy Van Arkkels as the new principal, beginning her term in Term 3 of 2026.

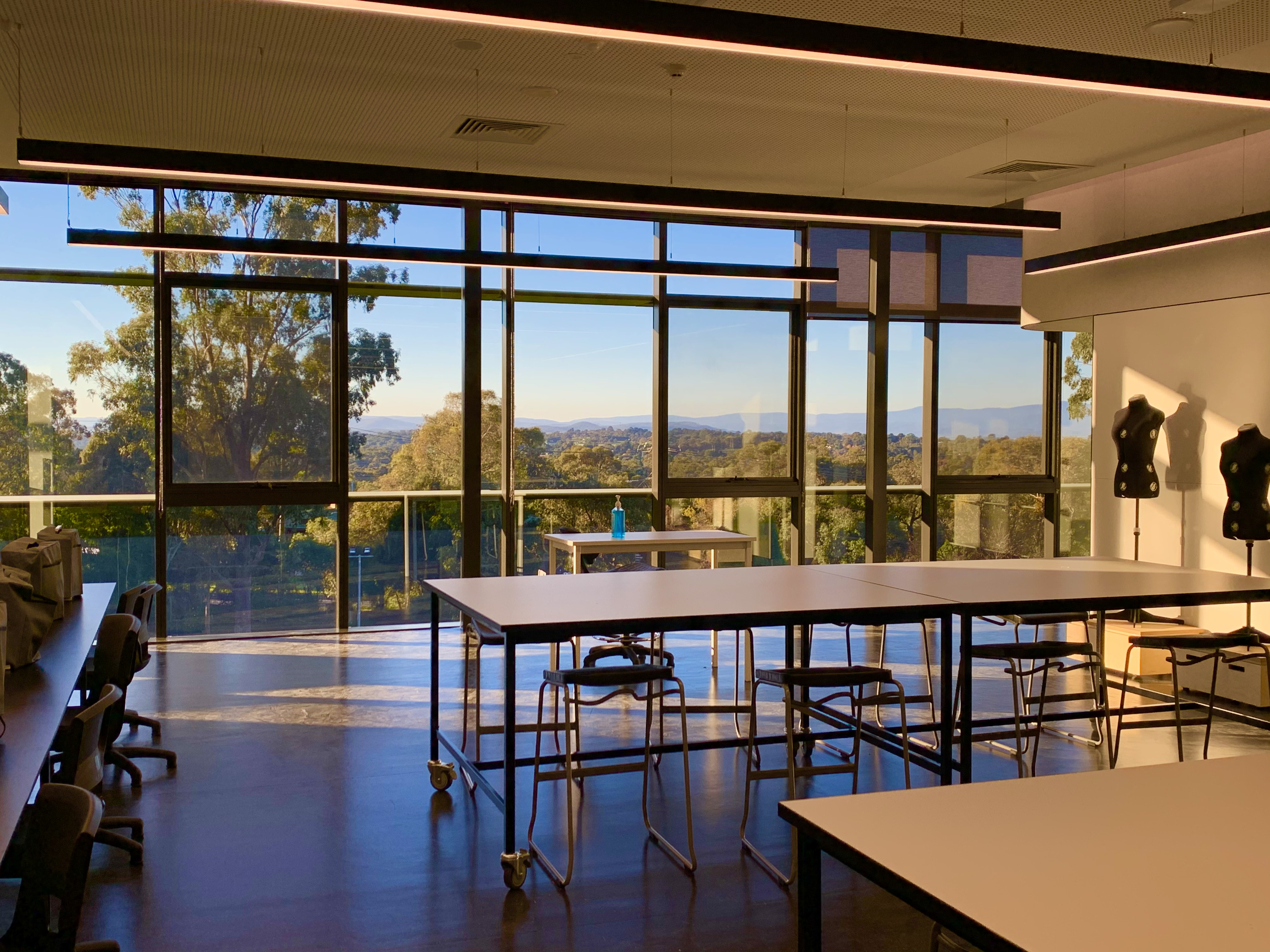
Yarra Valley Grammar fine arts classroom overlooking the Dandenong Ranges and the north campus

== Curriculum ==
Compulsory core subjects exist from years 7 to 10 with electives being offered to students from year 9. The school also offers select Vocational Education and Training subjects, as well as VCE.

The school offers co-curriculum programs outside of the standard curriculum, including:

- Drama productions (plays and musicals)
- ESTEAM Programs
- Music orchestras, band and choirs
- Debating
- Community Links
- Swimming, athletics, canoeing, volleyball, golf, snowsports

== Houses ==
Yarra Valley Grammar had four coloured school houses allocated by the school to each student upon entry. These houses compete at school athletics as well as during performing arts week and in music and science.

On the 22nd of June, 2026, Yarra Valley Grammar announced four new houses: Vick, Tipping, Hirst, and Edwards, honouring the respective peoples contribution to the school's growth.

House	Colour	Details
Annells	Light blue	Annells House is named after Don Annells, a founding member of Yarra Valley Grammar and an original board member.
Arnott	Maroon	Arnott House is named after Richard Arnott, a founding member of a Yarra Valley Grammar.
Hughes	Gold	Hughes House is named after Dale Hughes, the head of English at Yarra Valley Grammar.
Plummer	Green	Plummer House is named after Tom Plummer, a founding member of Yarra Valley Grammar.
Vick	Magenta	Vick House is named after Gary Vick, a former member of the school board of Yarra Valley Grammar from 1996-2011.
Tipping	Dark blue	Tipping House is named after Sarah Tipping, a former member of the school board of Yarra Valley Grammar from 2001-2019.
Hirst	Orange	Hirst House is named after Andrew Hirst, a former member of the school board of Yarra Valley Grammar from 2012-2024.
Edwards	Dark purple	Edwards House is named after Carrie Edwards-Britt, the current Chair of the School Board.

== Sport ==
Yarra Valley Grammar is a member of the Associated Grammar Schools of Victoria (AGSV) and competes professionally and at the amateur level with other associated member schools. Yarra Valley also conducts physical education classes, health and fitness and body wellbeing classes throughout years 7–10. The school also offers skiing and snowboarding opportunities as a part of the YVG Snow Sports Team, as well as canoeing, kayaking, equestrian and golf.

=== AGSV and AGSV/APS premierships ===
Yarra Valley Grammar has won the following AGSV and AGSV/APS premierships.

Boys:

- Athletics (2) – 1981, 1985
- Basketball (2) – 2008, 2009
- Cricket (3) – 1985, 2011, 2014
- Football (1) - 2024
- Golf (3) – 1989, 2018, 2019
- Hockey – 1998
- Tennis (3) – 1989, 2013, 2014
- Volleyball (17) – 1992, 1993, 1994, 1995, 1996, 1997, 1998, 2000, 2001, 2002, 2003, 2005, 2007, 2009, 2012, 2013, 2024

Girls:

- Badminton – 2010
- Basketball (3) – 2015, 2016, 2021
- Cross country (6) – 1998, 1999, 2000, 2001, 2002, 2003
- Softball – 2021
- Swimming (3) – 2001, 2002, 2005
- Volleyball (14) – 2003, 2004, 2005, 2006, 2007, 2009, 2010, 2011, 2012, 2014, 2015, 2016, 2020, 2021
- Athletics (1) - 2025

== Notable alumni ==
=== Politics, Law and Literature ===
- Peter Almond (1972) – Judge of the Supreme Court of Victoria
- Andy Griffiths (1979) – Children's Author
- David Lyons (1993) – Hollywood Actor
- Paul Singer MVO (1995) – Official Secretary to the Governor-General; and co-founder and General Manager, Make a Mark Australia
- Radha Stirling – Human rights advocate

=== Sport and the Olympics ===
- Travis Cloke
- Jason Cloke
- Cameron Cloke
- Sam Blease
- Shane Biggs
- Jordan Gysberts
- Kelvin Moore
- Andrew Moore
- Jordan Gallucci
- Andrew Moore – Port Adelaide and Richmond
- Kieran Harper – North Melbourne
- Sam Harper – Victorian Sheffield Shield team and Melbourne Renegades player
- Grant Nel (2006) – Olympic Diver
- Dave Culbert (1984) – Olympic Long Jumper, Sports Commentator and Director of Jump Media
- Campbell Message (1992) – Paralympic Medallist
- James Elmer (1988) – Olympic Hockey Player
- Ryley Stoddart
- Shannon Eagland
- Tarni Brown
- Brendon Smith
- Judson Clarke

== See also ==
- List of schools in Victoria, Australia
- List of high schools in Victoria
- Victorian Certificate of Education
