= Alfred Mellor =

Australian stockbroker (1915–2011)

Alfred Mellor CBE

Chairman of the Melbourne Stock Exchange
- In office 1960–1966

Personal details
- Born: Alfred Burdett Mellor; 2 November 1915 Canterbury, Victoria, Australia
- Died: 7 April 2011 (aged 95) Kew, Victoria, Australia
- Spouse(s): Phyllis Garnham (m. 1939; div. 1971) Ann Walsh (m. 1974; died 2015)
- Education: Carey Baptist Grammar School
- Occupation: Stockbroker; financier

Military service
- Allegiance: Australia
- Branch/service: Australian Army
- Years of service: 1941–1946
- Rank: Lieutenant
- Unit: 7th Division
- Battles/wars: World War II; New Guinea Campaign; Kokoda Track Campaign

Alfred Burdett Mellor CBE (2 November 1915 – 7 April 2011) was a stockbroker and financier who was the Chairman of the Melbourne Stock Exchange between 1960 and 1966.

Mellor was born in Canterbury where according to an interview in 2004, he had a privileged upbringing, where he lived in various stately homes that his grandparents owned. He was one of the first of 68 students to study at Carey Baptist Grammar School, matriculating in 1933 (known as a Founding Scholar at Carey).

Upon completing secondary school, Mellor was offered a role as a messenger at the stockbroking firm, J.B. Were & Sons. He would remain in that role until 1941 when he enlisted in the Australian Army.

However, during the war years, he served in the Second Australian Imperial Force (AIF) as a Lieutenant and field-gunner in the New Guinea Campaign until he was decommissioned in 1946.

After this period of service, Mellor continued his pre-war career and immediately founded his own stockbroking firm. By 1949, he was elected to the Committee of the Stock Exchange in Melbourne. In this capacity, he would be promoted to Chairman by 1960 and worked with the ANZ Bank. During the 1960s, he had a close working relationship with both Sir Robert Menzies and Harold Holt. Mellor would later become the Chairman of the Australian Associated Stock Exchanges (AASE), the precursor to the Australian Securities Exchange (ASX) in the late 1960s.

For his work in the financial sector, Mellor was awarded the Commander of the Order of the British Empire (CBE) in the Queen’s 1966 Birthday Honours List.

He was appointed a Commander of the Order of the British Empire (CBE) in the 1966 Birthday Honours.

Outside of his work, Mellor would volunteer extensively at his former school, Carey, in a variety of capacities before his death. This included joining the School Council (board) and representing the Old Carey Grammarians Association (OCGA) for over 40 years. He would later become President of the School Council from 1972 to 1981. His later years led him to become the honorary archivist as well as being bestowed the ‘Carey Medal’ in 1999 and the Mellor Museum on the school campus being named in his honour for his services to the school community. In addition to this, Mellor was also a member of the Baptist Church, and practised his faith at Canterbury Baptist Church for many years.

Mellor eventually died at the age of 95 in Kew in 2011.
