= Peter Almond =

Australian judge

Peter Almond is a Trials Division justice at the Supreme Court of Victoria.

He was educated at Yarra Valley Grammar and is a graduate of the undergraduate and graduate program in law at the University of Melbourne. During his career as a lawyer he represented clients including the Australian Stock Exchange.
