= Peter Crawley (headmaster) =

Australian educator

- Born: 16 October 1953 (age 73); Adelaide, South Australia
- Education: Newington College; Flinders University; University of New England
- Occupation: Retired school headmaster
- Spouse: Anne
- Children: One son, two daughters
- Parent(s): James and Elizabeth Crawley

Peter Crawley (born 16 October 1953) is the Australian former headmaster of Trinity Grammar School, Victoria, Knox Grammar School and St Hilda's School. He has authored and co-authored a number books on educational issues. In 2023 he was appointed as a member of the college council at his old school Newington College. Prior to his appointment to Newington council he served as chairman of the council of The Hills Grammar School.

== Early life ==
Crawley was born in Adelaide, South Australia, the son of James and Elizabeth Crawley and attended Newington College (1965–1971). He received a Bachelor of Arts (Hons) degree and a Diploma of Education from Flinders University, and a Master of Educational Administration degree from the University of New England. He also has a GradCert in theology, he is a Fellow of the Australian College of Educational Leadership (vic), and was awarded an honorary Doctorate by Griffith University in 2016.

== Teaching career ==
His teaching career began in 1977 at Augusta Park High School in South Australia. He was assistant senior resident master (1980 to 1982) and head of history (1988 to 1989) at Prince Alfred College, Adelaide and during this time spent a year at Felsted School in Essex, England. He was deputy principal of Ballarat and Clarendon College from 1990 until 1992. In 1993 he became headmaster of Trinity Grammar School, Victoria. While at Trinity he was interviewed by The Sunday Age in an article on corporal punishment and discussed the changes in attitudes in independent boys schools since the 1960s, having experienced them first-hand as a student and teacher.

During Crawley's time at Trinity, the school became a world leader in the use of computers in schools, mandating each student have a laptop. He approached Microsoft about using their Office software package for his students, instead of the then-standard schools package. A year later, Microsoft had released Office to schools worldwide and made a film about Trinity's ideas for integrating technology with education. Bill Gates sent Crawley a personal letter thanking him for his ideas on the use of laptops in schools. Crawley was also invited to Japan to address the board of Toshiba about the use of technology in schools.

In 1999 Crawley moved to Sydney as head of Knox Grammar School. As Knox's sixth headmaster, he is credited for "bringing the School into the 21st century with an innovative program of technology and computer-based learning." He left to Knox to become managing director of an educational firm, Creative School Management. In 2006 Crawley moved to the Gold Coast to become principal of St Hilda's School, their first male head of school. During his time at St Hilda's they became one of the first schools in the world to adopt the iPad as a teaching and learning device. He retired from St Hilda's at the end of 2016. In October 2019 he was appointed the interim principal of the Glennie School in Toowoomba, Queensland. In 2021 he spent 6 months as the interim Principal of Arden Anglican School, Sydney.

Crawley was awarded an honorary doctorate for services to education from Griffith University. The award specifically mentioned his contribution to the use of technology in education and his contribution to the education of girls. Griffith described him as "one of the pioneers of using computers and tablets in the classroom".

== Publications ==
He has published a book on School Boards and another on the role of Heads of Department. With Philip Cummins and Eric Bernard, Crawley has published the following educational books;

- Managing Risk in Your School, Woollahra, NSW: Circle, 2011
- Staff Evaluation and Goal-Setting, Crows Nest, NSW: Circle, 2010
