= Simon Gipson =

Simon Gipson is an Australian teacher, administrator and educational consultant. He has consulted in Australia, Thailand, Hong Kong, New Zealand, the United Kingdom and the United States. He is a former Head of St Michaels Grammar School and is currently the CEO of The Song Room, Chairman of The Association of Coeducational Schools (ACS), Chair of the Trinity Grammar School Council; and sits on the board of the Association of Independent Schools Victoria (AISV). Gipson will take up the position of interim Headmaster at St Paul's School at Bald Hills in Brisbane from Term 4, 2023. Gipson was awarded the Medal of the Order of Australia (OAM) in 2020 for his work.

== Professional career ==
Gipson taught English and Drama at several independent schools in Western Australia before becoming Deputy Headmaster at Guildford Grammar School. In 1996, he was appointed Principal of Tridhos School Village, a project in Northern Thailand designed to introduce educational reform and best practice teaching and learning in South East Asia.

Gipson was appointed Headmaster of Melbourne independent school, St Michael's Grammar School, in 2000. He succeeded previous Headmaster Tony Hewison, who had been head there for 20 years. Gipson immediately started major reform at the school, and as a result has become well known due to this avant garde approach to education.

Gipson has been a notable commentator on educational issue, including authoring several articles published in The Age, a leading Melbourne newspaper.

In 2020, he became the Chair of School Council at Trinity Grammar School, Kew.

== Educational reform ==
Gipson has published and presented in various areas of educational reform and restructuring, in redefining teacher professionalism, and in the application of Information Technology in teaching and learning. In 2002, he was invited as an International Research Associate for the United Kingdom National College for School Leadership to investigate the leadership implications of the implementation of Information Technology in English schools.

== Media appearances ==
=== The Age Newspaper ===
- "Private, public schools hit out at PM's 'values' claim". The Age. 21 January 2004.
- The price of going private, The Age & Sydney Morning Herald, 2002-02-13
- "The hard sell". The Age. 22 September 2005.
- Review may ban strap in schools, The Age, 2004-09-04
- "Downloading porn out of the home". The Age. 6 March 2003.
- "Laptops, iPods: are they friend or fiend?". The Age. 15 October 2005.
- "School fear over Salvo crisis centre". The Age. 23 September 2005.
- "Schools call in class acts to give them the edge". The Age. 13 August 2005.
- Schools likely to accept corporal punishment ban, The Age, 2002-02-13
- "Technology can't replace school environment". The Age. 18 August 2003.
- Houston, Cameron (30 October 2011). "Fury as under-age girls used to sex-up nightclub". The Age.

=== ABC Broadcast ===
- Public Versus Private Schools, George Negus Tonight (Transcript), ABC, 2004-04-01

=== Other ===
- Parliament of Victoria Parliamentary Debates (Hansard), 2000-05-25 (Pg 1784 (28 of 102))
- St Michael's Grammar School Adds New Meaning to the Virtual Classroom, Voice&Data.com.au, 2000-09-02
- ICT, teaching and learning and school design. Reflections on the UK context — Incorporated Association of Registered Teachers of Victoria (IARTV)
- The challenges of integrating information technology into a Thai educational setting: The story of Tridhos School Village, Chiang Mai — Ed' Tech 98
- Planning technology for schools: A design methodology. — Ed' Tech 98
- Situating learning with the help of the World Wide Web — Teaching & Learning Forum 2001
- Issues of ICT in Education — National College for School Leadership
