= Kelvin Moore (footballer, born 1984) =

Australian rules footballer (born 1984)

Personal information
- Full name: Kelvin Moore
- Born: 25 March 1984 (age 42); Mitcham, Victoria
- Original team: Healesville/Yarra Valley Old Boys
- Draft: 2003 rookie draft Richmond
- Height: 190 cm (6 ft 3 in)
- Weight: 86 kg (190 lb)
- Position: Full back / centre half back

Club information
- Current club: Richmond
- Number: 40

Playing career^{1}
Years	Club	Games (Goals)
2004–2012	Richmond	87 (12)
- ^{1} Playing statistics correct to the end of 2012.

Kelvin Moore (born 25 March 1984) is a former Australian rules footballer. He previously played for the Richmond Football Club in the Australian Football League (AFL).

Whilst injuries held back most of his early career, Moore secured a spot in the Tigers' defence in season 2008. His athletic abilities combined with his toughness made him a valuable asset to Richmond's backline, often playing on much bigger forwards.

Injury kept Moore from playing any games in the 2011 season.

On 16 August 2012, after playing just 3 matches for the year, and missing out on almost two years of AFL action, Moore, along with his Tigers teammate Brad Miller, announced his retirement, effective immediately. He left the club having played 87 games and booting 12 goals. After 685 days of being off field Moore made a comeback in 2012 against the Gold Coast Suns in a game that Richmond lost after a goal after the siren by Karmichael Hunt.
