= Carey Baptist Grammar School =

Baptist, independent, coeducational school in Melbourne, Victoria

Location
- Kew & Donvale, Victoria; Australia; 37°48′53″S 145°02′51″E

Information
- Type: Private, christian & day school
- Motto: Latin: Animo et Fide (By Courage and Faith)
- Denomination: Baptist
- Established: 13 February 1923; 103 years ago
- Founder: Leonard Tranter
- Chairman: Timothy Chilvers
- Principal: Jonathan Walter
- Chaplain: Timothy Edwards
- Grades: Kindergarten–Year 12
- Gender: Co-educational
- Enrolment: ~2,530 (2023)
- Colours: Black, blue and gold
- Song: Play the Game (since 1944)
- Publication: The Torch magazine
- Yearbook: The Chronicle
- Tuition: K-12: $26,372–$40,824; International students: $51,365–$52,067
- Affiliation: Associated Public Schools of Victoria
- Alumni: Old Carey Grammarians
- Website: www.carey.com.au

Carey Baptist Grammar School, commonly known as Carey, is an independent, co-educational, Baptist day school in Victoria, Australia.

The school has five campuses: Kew (ELC to Year 12), Donvale (ELC to Year 6), the Carey Sports Complex in Bulleen, the Carey Sport Complex in Kew and an outdoor education camp near Paynesville in eastern Gippsland called Carey Toonallook.

Carey is affiliated with the Junior School Heads Association of Australia (JSHAA), the Association of Heads of Independent Schools of Australia (AHISA), the Association of Independent Schools of Victoria (AISV), and has been a member of the Associated Public Schools of Victoria (APS) since 1958. The school has offered its Year 11 and 12 students the choice to study either the International Baccalaureate Diploma (IB) since 1997 or the Victorian Certificate of Education (VCE).

The school is named in honour of William Carey, a Baptist missionary and self-taught language scholar who carried out humanitarian work in India for the Baptist Missionary Society (BMS) in the late 18th century. Carey's motto was based on William Carey's 1792 sermon from Isaiah 54, in which he called on Baptists to establish a missionary society.

== House system ==
House name	Colour
Cartwright	Green
Dunshea	Orange
Fullard	Maroon
Gadsden	Dark green
Hickman	Light blue
Moore	Yellow
Newnham	Purple
Steele	Dark blue
Sutton	Red
Tranter	Black

== History ==
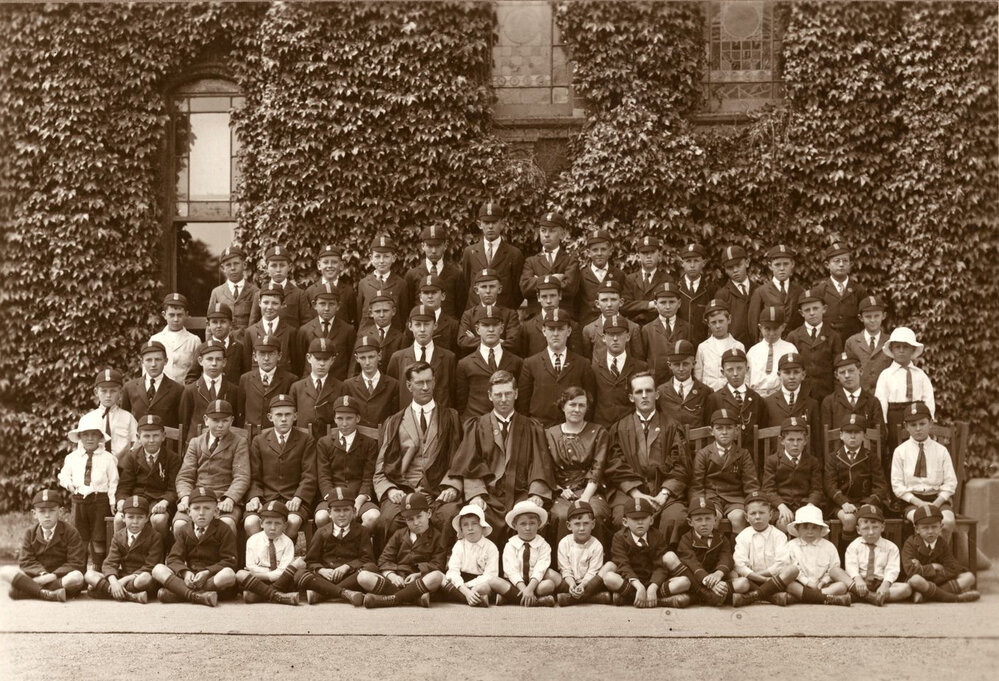
Foundation staff and scholars on Carey's first day in 1923

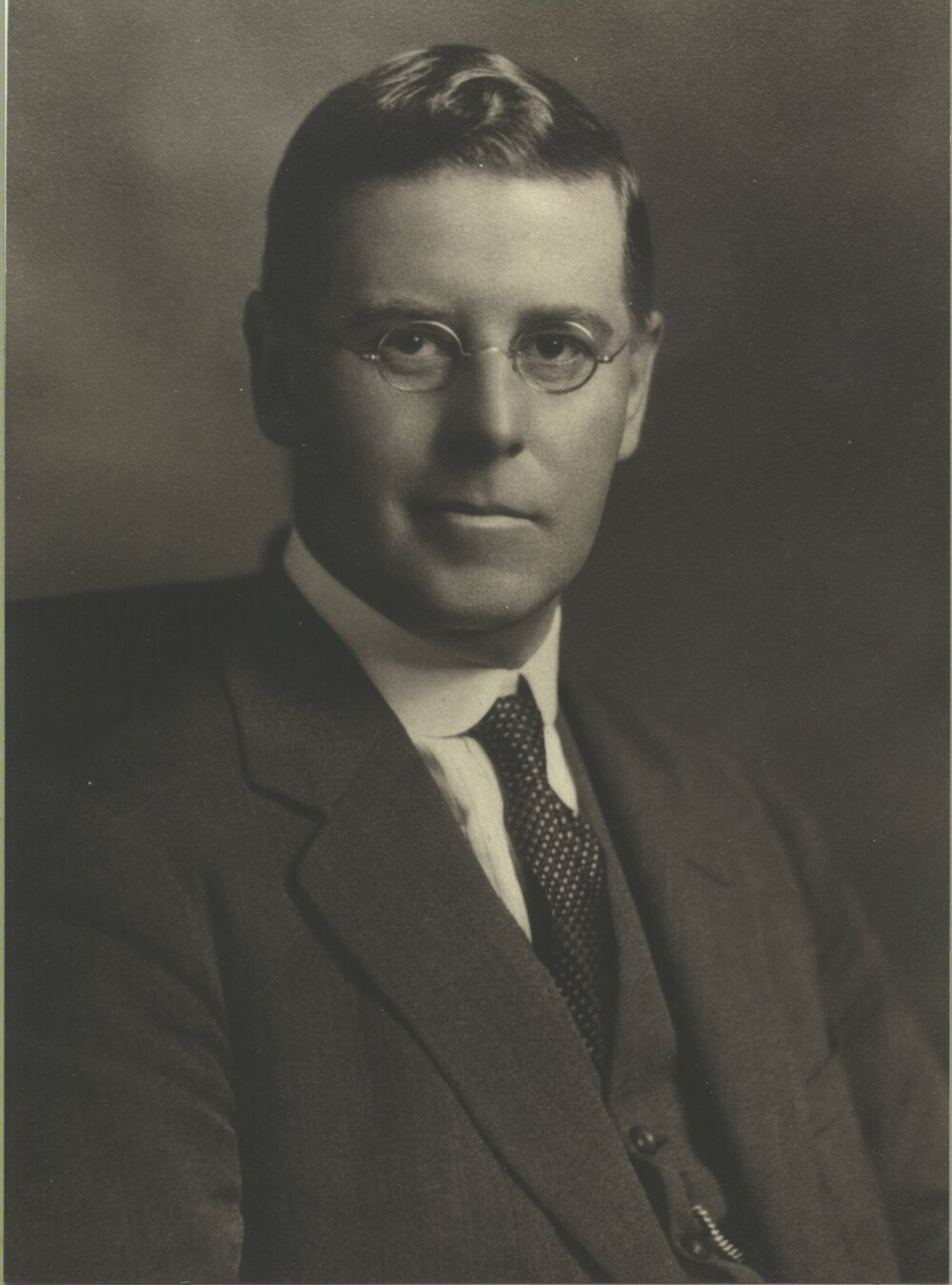
Inaugural headmaster, H. G. Steele in 1923

Carey Baptist Grammar School was founded by Leonard E. Tranter in 1923 after the Urangeline estate was purchased by the Baptist Union of Victoria (BUV) in 1922 for £14,000 in the pursuit of providing a Baptist education for boys. The Urangeline mansion estate was originally designed by architect, Joseph Reed for the Scottish-born solicitor, James C. Stewart. Work was completed in 1884 with the mansion being originally named Edzell then Mildura and finally Urangeline by its final owner in 1899. On Carey's opening day, 68 boys and four teachers were present for the official photograph on 13 February 1923.

In 1925, the school council appealed for a £10,000 amount to build a boarding house for students. After funds had been attained later that year, construction began and the Laycock House was officially opened in 1926. Between 1926 and 1951, it would be the boarding house. By 1951, the school chose to close the boarding house and convert it into classrooms. In 2008, the school decided to replace the Laycock house in exchange for a new performing arts centre, named in honour of its principal at the time, Phil de Young, who opened it in March 2010.

Carey opened Raymond Hall and its preparatory school in May 1925 at a total cost of £5,000. The hall was named after George Nelson Raymond, a wealthy boot factory owner and Baptist. The hall provided for the space to conduct assemblies and other large events until the Memorial Great Hall was completed in 1955. By 1942, the preparatory school housed over 100 students. In the 1990s, the hall and rooms were repurposed for the Middle School.

By 1926, the student population had grown to over 200 boys, demanding the need for an oval on the Urangeline estate. At a cost of £1,250 from the Oval appeal, levelling went underway with 7,000 tons of earth moved by horse. In 1927, the oval was opened for use and named Sandell Oval after the 1926 dux of the school, Arthur K. Sandell.

The Memorial Great Hall (MGH) was opened by governor of Victoria, Dallas Brooks as a way to memorialise the fallen students who fought in World War II. It was opened in 1954 and seated most assemblies and other meetings. The hall included a stained-glass window of the school badge. However, the building was renovated on two separate occasions, first in the 1990s and more recently in 2020, in which it now seats 1,000 students.

In 1960, 14 acres of land were purchased by the school in the suburb of Bulleen. The Carey Bulleen Sports Complex was officially opened by the deputy premier of Victoria, Arthur Rylah in October 1962. Since then, the land has been used as the schools playing fields as well as hosting a gymnasium and pool.

In 1971, the William Carey Chapel was opened by the president of the Baptist Union, Merlyn Holly after two years of construction. The design was led by the chaplain of the school at the time, Alan Wright. Numerous pieces of artwork and a sculpture was designed by Clifton Pugh. The chapel was paid for by the 'Forward Carey' Appeal of 1960, totalling $102,000. In 2020, the chapel was declared heritage listed by the local Boroondara Council following an extensive renovation by the school.

The school began co-education in 1979 when girls entered years 11 and 12. Coeducation was extended to all years by 1984. By 2011, the school had achieved an even gender split between boys and girls.

In 2019, the school bought the bowling club property of the Melbourne Cricket Club (MCC) on Barkers Road. The school renamed the property the Carey Kew Sports Complex. The school celebrated its centennial year in 2023 with various celebrations throughout the year. Carey purchased the Kalimna mansion from nearby Preshil in 2024 due to its financial difficulties.

Dunshea Oval, located at Carey's Bulleen Sports Complex, is the home of the Old Carey Football Club in the Victorian Amateur Football Association (VAFA) and hosted the VAFA Division 2 Men's grand final in 2025.

== Principals ==
There have been eight principals (formerly headmasters before 1989) since the school was founded in 1923. The current principal is Jonathan Walter, since January 2020.

Principals / headmasters of Carey
Years served	Name
1923–1944	Harold G. Steele
1945–1947	Vivian F.O. Francis
1948–1964	Stuart L. Hickman
1965–1989	Gerard L. Cramer
1990–2001	Ross H. Millikan
2002–2010	Phil W. de Young
2010–2019	Philip M. Grutzner
2020–present	Jonathan C. Walter

== Notable alumni ==
=== Media, entertainment and the arts ===
- Bianca Censori – model and architect
- Seb Costello (2004) – journalist, Nine News & Triple M
- Tom Elliott (1985) – investment banker and media personality
- Marieke Hardy (1993) – writer, broadcaster, television producer and actress
- Andrew Holden (1977) – editor-in-chief of The Press and The Age
- Kevin McQuay (1967) – 'Big Kev', television personality and entrepreneur
- Noel Mewton-Wood (1934) – pianist
- Steve Vizard (1973) – media personality and comedian
- Suzie Wilks (1987) – television personality
- Tom Wright (2001) – actor
- Gary Young (1964) – founding drummer for Daddy Cool
- Tommy Dassalo (2003) – podcaster and comedian

=== Politics, law and business ===
- Peter Costello (1972) – former Treasurer of Australia
- Ron Castan (1956) – barrister and human rights advocate
- Brian Eaton (1934) – RAAF air vice marshal
- John Elliott (1958) – former president of Carlton Football Club and the Liberal Party of Australia
- Murray Kellam (1964) – former Supreme Court judge and first president of VCAT
- George Lush (1929) – former judge on the Supreme Court of Victoria
- Alfred Mellor (1933) – stockbroker and banker
- Tony Smith (1985) – former Speaker of the Australian House of Representatives
- Brian Walters (1971) – barrister and human rights advocate
- Vernon Wilcox (1936) – former Attorney-General of Victoria

=== Religion and humanitarianism ===
- David Baden-Powell (1989) – hereditary peer and Scout leader
- Tim Costello (1972) – former president of the Baptist Union of Australia
- Hugh Evans (2001) – Young Australian of the Year in 2004 and co-founder of The Oaktree Foundation

=== Science and engineering ===
- Keith Farrer (1933) – food chemist and Baptist pastor
- Albert Lloyd George Rees (1933) – chemical physicist
- Rutherford Ness Robertson (1925) – botanist and biologist

=== Sport ===
- Noah Anderson (2019) – AFL player for Gold Coast Suns
- Jason Ashby (2012) – AFL player for Essendon Football Club
- Laura Barden (2012) – hockey player for Hockeyroos
- Hana Basic (2013) – Olympic sprinter
- Harriet Cordner (2011) – AFLW footballer for Richmond Tigers, Melbourne Demons
- Johannah Curran (2005) – netball player for Melbourne Vixens
- Nick Daicos (2020) – AFL footballer for Collingwood Magpies
- Jesse Dattoli (2024) – AFL footballer for Sydney Swans
- Ollie Dempsey (2020) – AFL footballer for Geelong
- Jake Fraser-McGurk (2020) – cricketer
- Andrew Gaff (2010) – AFL player for West Coast Eagles
- Ellen Gandy (2010) – Olympic swimmer
- Renae Hallinan (2004) – netball player for Australian Netball Diamonds
- Nathan Hrovat (2012)- AFL player
- Kristian Jaksch (2012) – AFL footballer for GWS Giants, Carlton Football Club
- Matthew Laidlaw (2005) – former AFL player for Sydney Swans
- Daniel Jackson (2004) – AFL player for Richmond Tigers
- Ben Jepson (2019) – AFL player for Gold Coast Suns
- Ahmed Kelly (2012) – paralympic swimmer
- Meg Lanning (2009) – captain of the Australian women's national cricket team
- Katie Lynch (2018) – AFLW footballer for Collingwood Magpies/Western Bulldogs
- Jack Macrae (2012) – AFL player for Western Bulldogs/St Kilda Football Club
- Tom Mitchell (2011) – AFL player for Hawthorn Hawks
- Darcy Moore (2013) – AFL player for Collingwood Magpies
- Julie Prendergast (2004) – netballer
- Emma Randall (2002) – basketball player
- Ed Richards (2017) AFL player for Western Bulldogs
- Matthew Rowell (2019) – AFL player for Gold Coast Suns
- James Tomkins (1989) – Olympic rower
- Jack Viney (2012) – AFL player for Melbourne Demons
- David Wansbrough (1982) – Olympic hockey player
- Josh Weddle (2022) - AFL player
- Karl Worner (2020)- AFL player
- Nicola Xenos (2019) – AFLW footballer for St Kilda
- Graham Yallop (1971) – captain of the Australian men's cricket team

== Further images ==
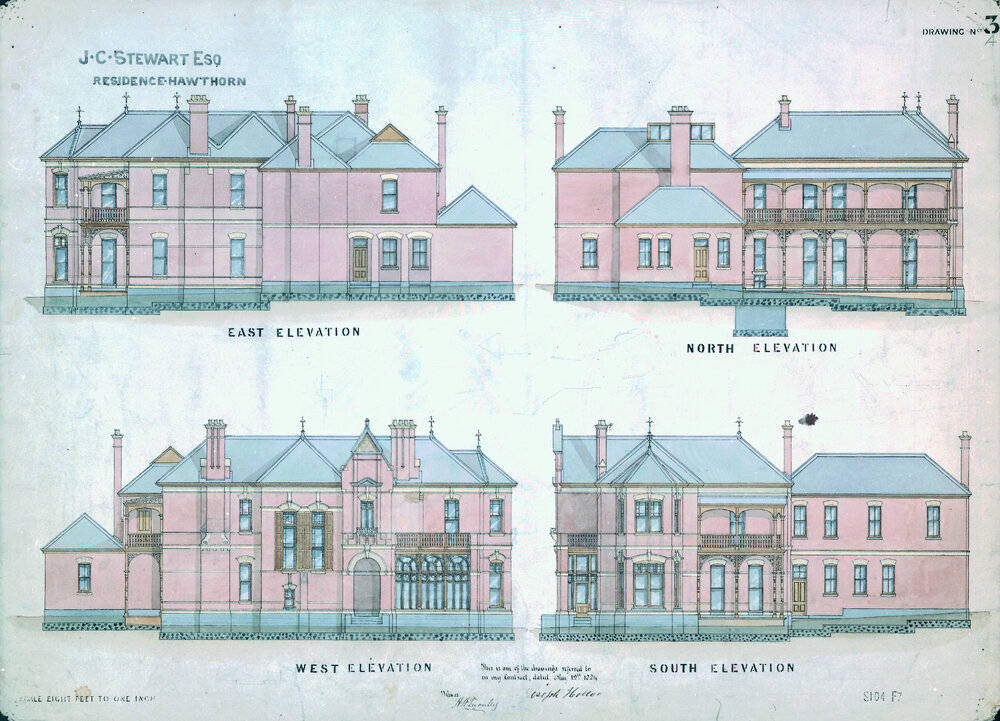
Urangeline House design in 1884

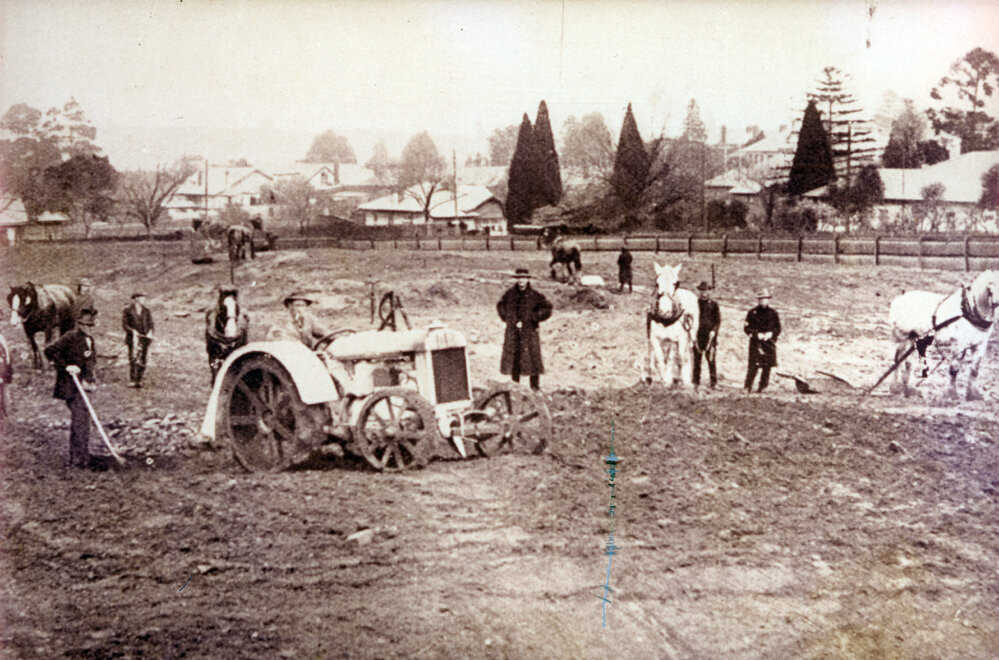
Levelling Sandell Oval in 1926

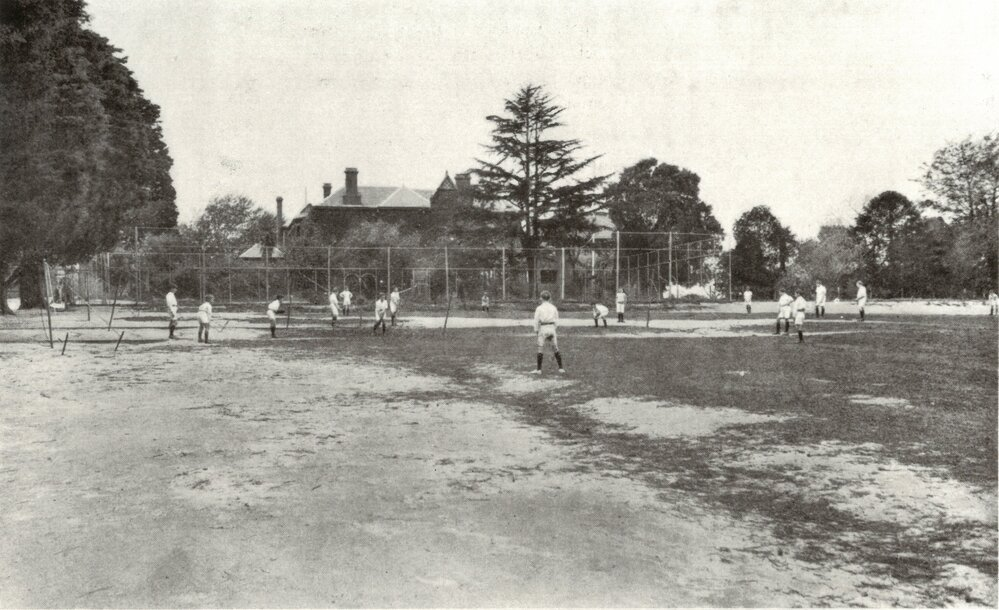
Preparatory school playground in 1928

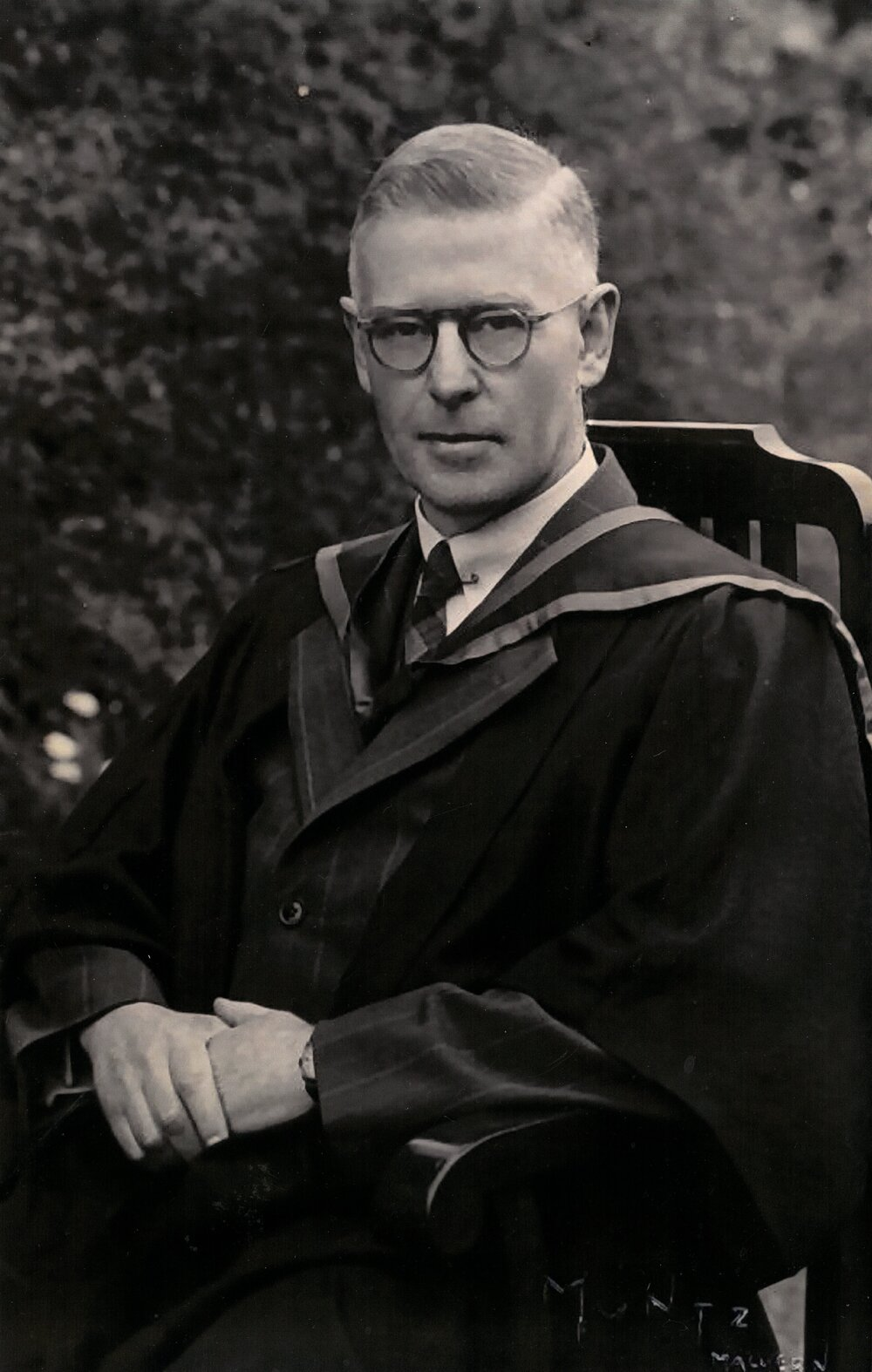
Inaugural headmaster, Harold Steele, circa 1940

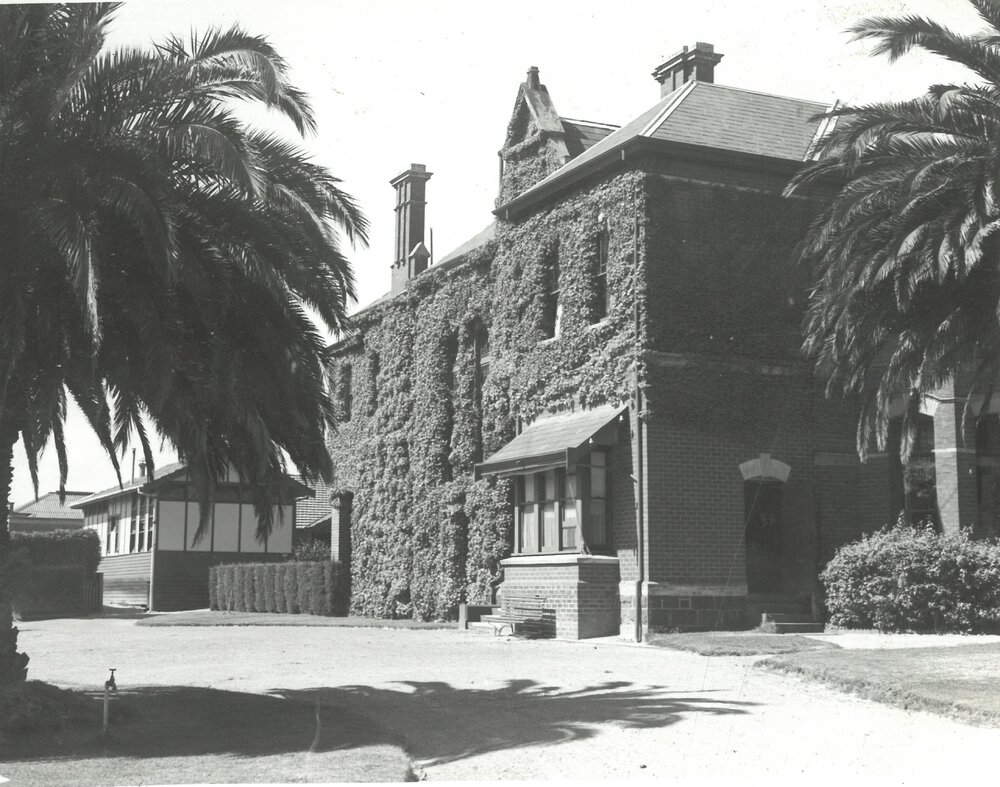
Urangeline House in 1943

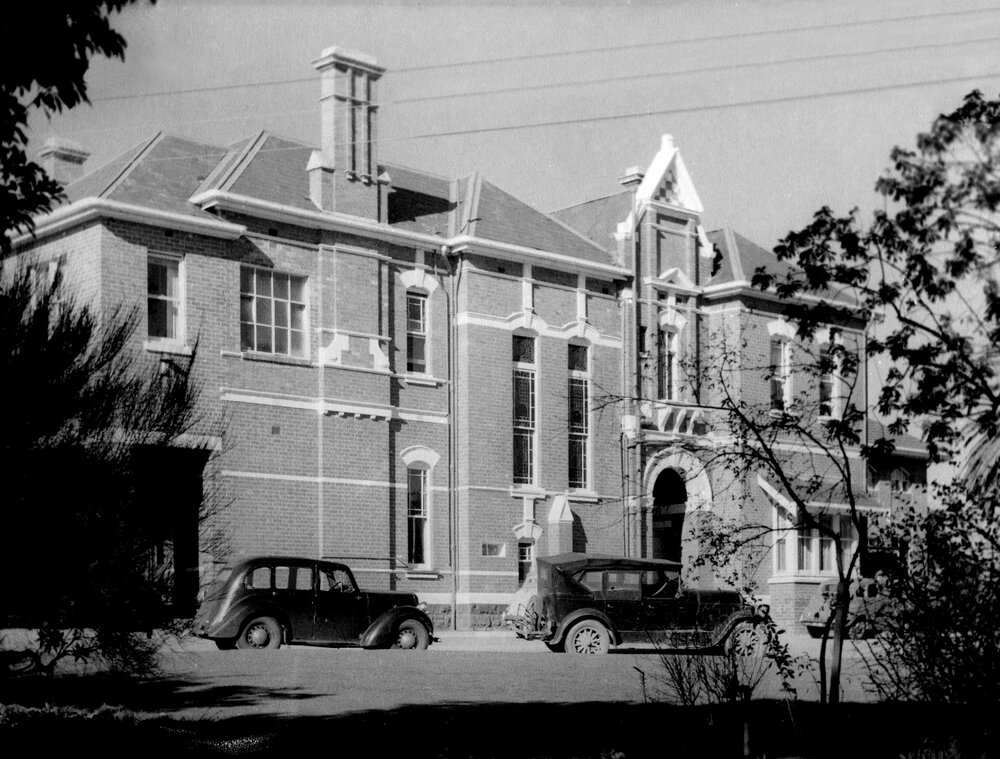
Urangeline House in 1954

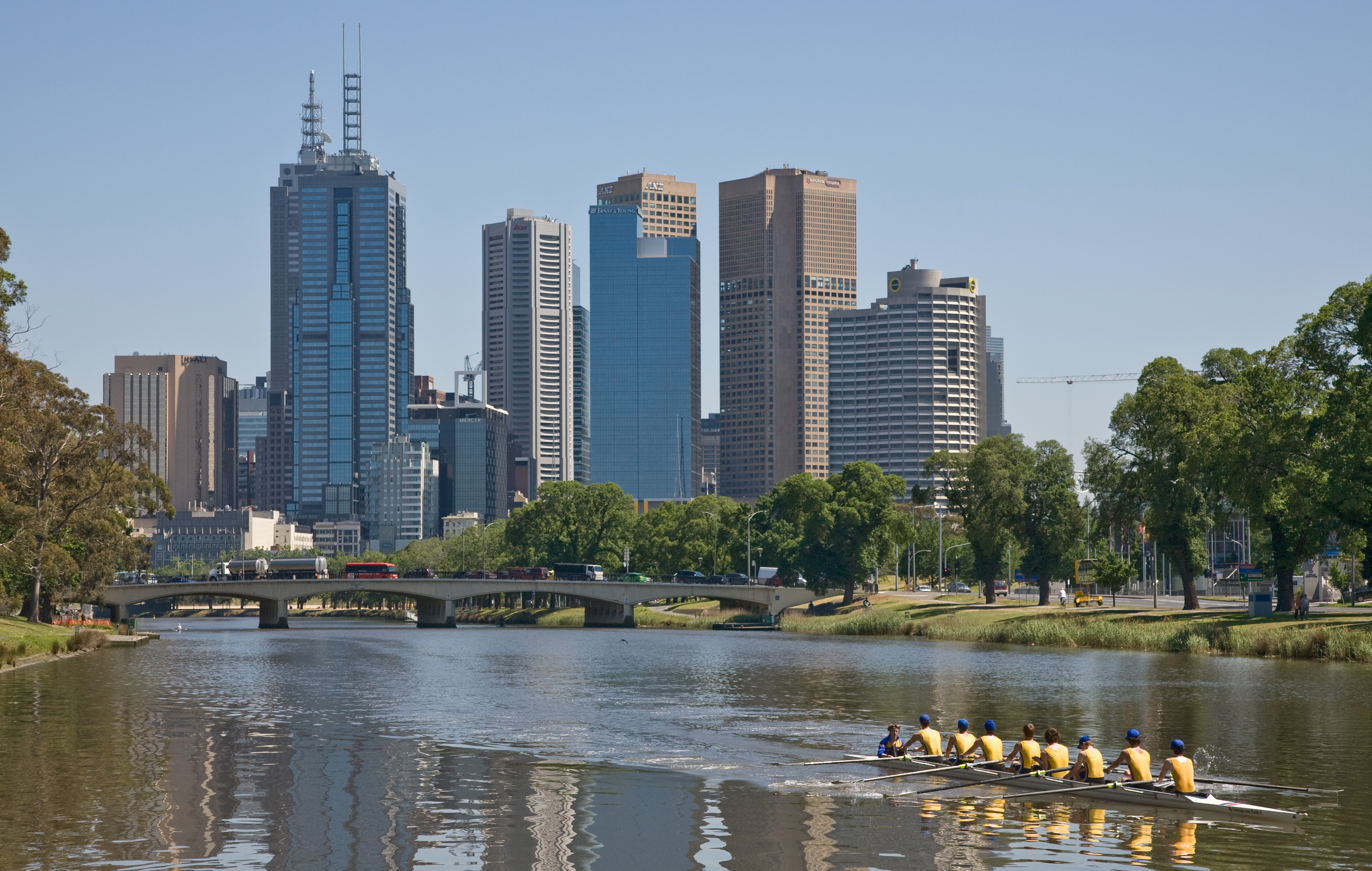
Carey Boat Crew on Yarra River in 2008

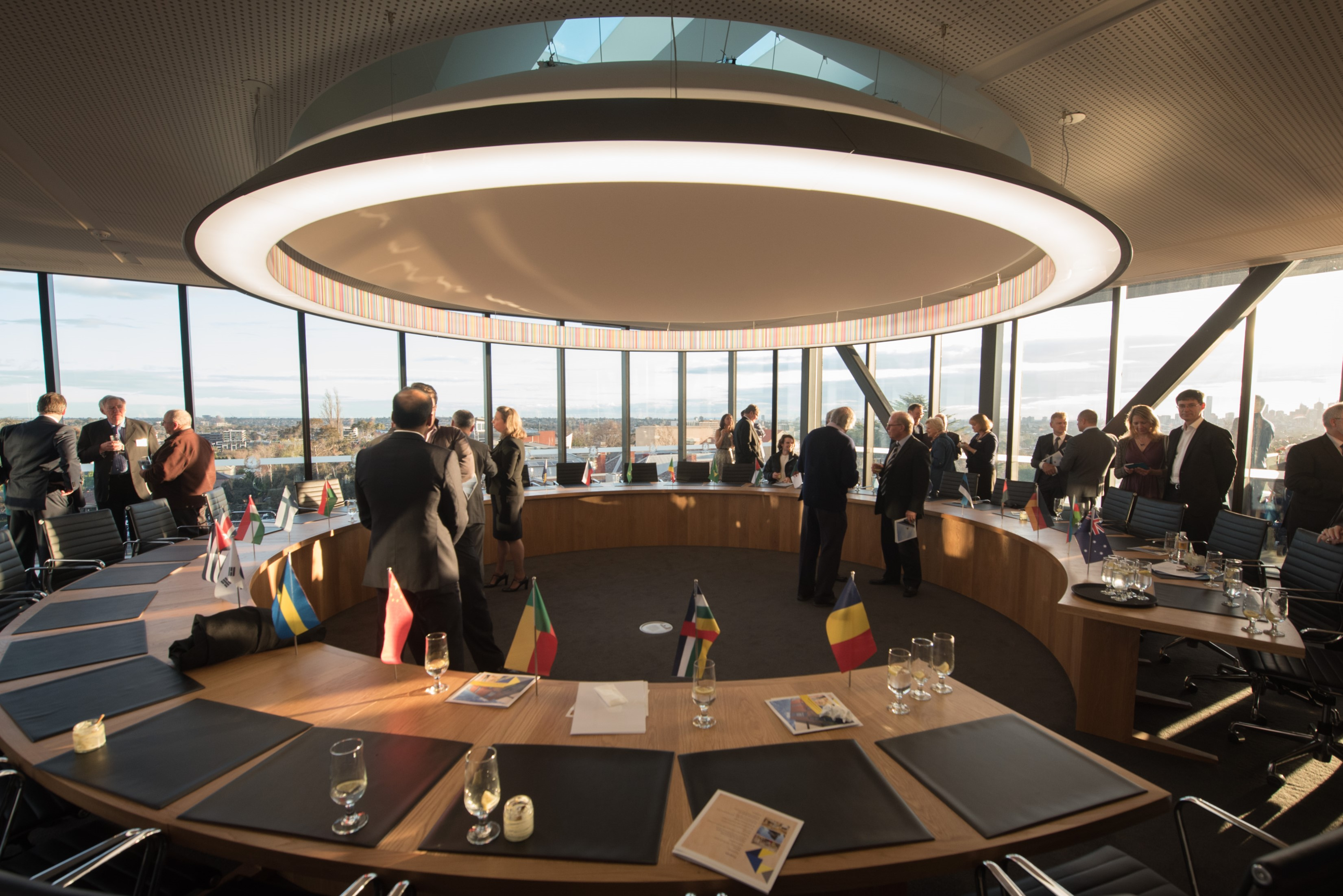
Carey UN Room in 2016

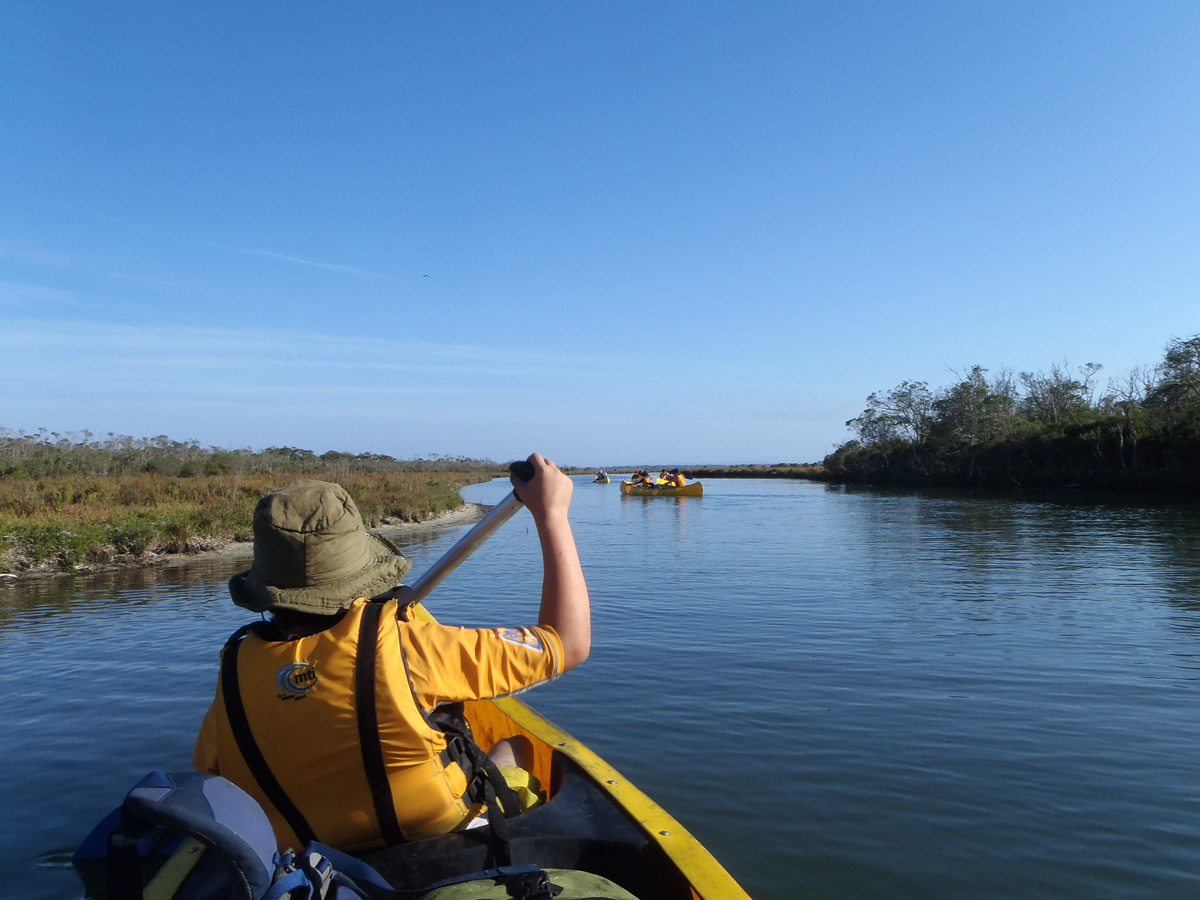
Camp Toonallook in 2017

== See also ==
- List of schools in Victoria
- Victorian Certificate of Education (VCE)
- International Baccalaureate Diploma (IB)
