= Australian Institute of Food Science and Technology =

AIFST
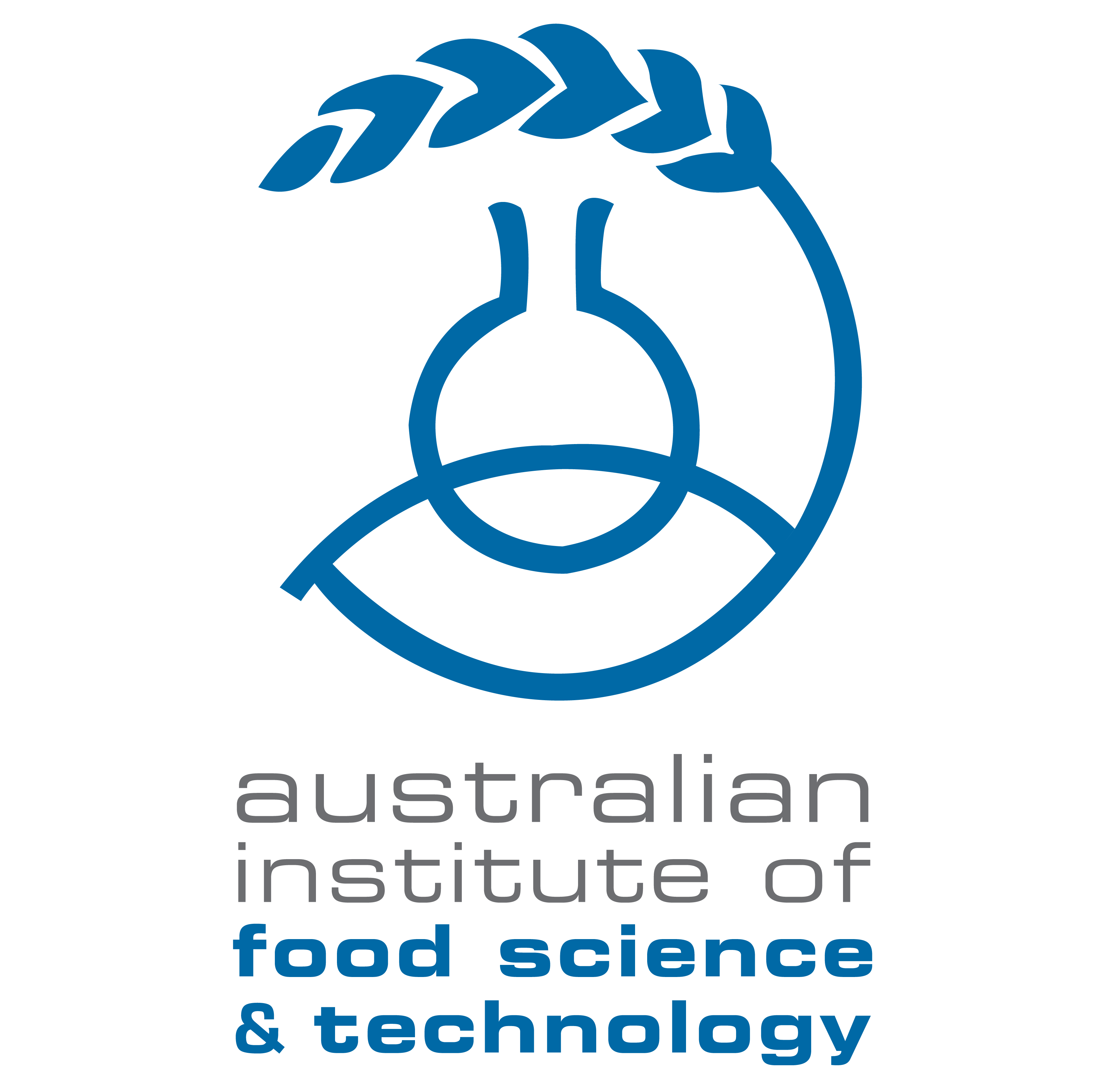
- Established: 1967
- Headquarters: North Ryde, NSW, 2113
- Dept. type: Food Science and Technology
- Website: https://www.aifst.asn.au/

The Australian Institute of Food Science and Technology Incorporated (AIFST) is a national, not-for-profit industry body representing individuals from all sectors of the food science and technology industry.

Originally established as an overseas section of the US-based Institute of Food Technologists (IFT), the AIFST became an independent association on 20 April 1967. The AIFST was a founding member of IUFoST, and retains strong links with IFT and IUFoST today.

An AIFST National Convention is held annually, and is the major national food technology conference in Australia, attracting industry, research and government organisations from Australia and overseas.

In addition to the Convention, services provided to members include:

- Publication of a monthly technical journal ("Food Australia").
- State branch newsletters and specialist technical publications.
- Branch activities including technical, social and networking meetings.
- Special interest groups including Cook Chill, Microbiology, Nutrition, Product Development and Sensory Evaluation.
- Cooperative meetings with affiliated industry sector organisations.
- Representation to government, education and legislative organisations.
- Career development and student support.

== See also ==
- Food science
- Food technology
