= List of Bond University people =

This is an incomplete list of Bond University people, including alumni and staff.

== Alumni ==
=== Academic ===
- Terry Gygar, legal academic

=== Business ===
- David Baxby, CEO, Virgin Management Asia Pacific, Chancellor of Bond University from May 2024
- Patrick Baynes, entrepreneur
- Fiona de Jong, former CEO, Australian Olympic Committee
- John Osbourne, CEO, Cronulla-Sutherland Sharks
- Richard Richards, CFO, Seven Group Holdings
- Tom Seymour, former CEO, PwC Australia
- Tommy Spaulding, businessman and author

=== Government ===
==== Politicians ====
===== Federal politicians =====
- Steven Ciobo, federal Member for Moncrieff
- Tim Watts, federal Member for Gellibrand, since 2013
- John McVeigh, federal Member for Division of Groom

===== State and territory politicians =====
- Lex Bell, Member of the Legislative Assembly of Queensland (2001–2004)
- Verity Barton, Member of the Legislative Assembly of Queensland, since 2012
- Andrew McIntosh, member of the Victorian Legislative Assembly

===== International politicians =====
- Kiyoshi Igarashi, Japanese politician, Member of the House of Representatives
- Brian Jean, the Leader of the Opposition in Alberta, Canada
- Tupou VI, King of Tonga (2012–present), former High Commissioner to Australia, former Prime Minister of Tonga (2000–2006)
- Rakuita Vakalalabure, Fijian politician

=== Humanities ===
==== Arts ====
- Luke Baines, actor
- Radha Stirling, community activist

==== Journalism and media ====
- Caroline Graham, Walkley-award winning investigative journalist
- Sara Groen, television presenter
- Wendy Kingston, Nine News presenter
- Hazel Villa, journalist
- Vanessa Grimm, Sky News Live anchor
- Matthew Sait, Lawyer, Chairman of the Australian Monarchist League's ACT & Region Branch, media spokesperson
- Jemima Burt, journalist, ABC news reporter

==== Literature, writing and poetry ====
- Trevor Carolan, fiction writer
- Samantha Strauss, screenwriter and creator of Dance Academy
- Antony Szeto, film director
- Tommy Wirkola, film director, producer and screenwriter

=== Science ===
- Hilda Bastian, health advocate

=== Sport ===
- Chris Atkinson, WRC driver
- Courtney Atkinson, triathlete
- Lara Davenport, swimmer
- Chris Fydler, swimmer
- Grant Hackett, swimmer
- Isabella Rositano, multi-sport athlete
- Nuko Hifo, rugby league player
- Ky Hurst, Ironman and swimmer
- Daniel Kowalski, swimmer
- Jason Little, rugby player
- Michael Murphy, former Olympian diver
- Giaan Rooney, swimmer
- Andrew Utting, Olympic baseball player
- Annabelle Williams, swimmer

== Administration ==
=== Chancellors ===
Order	Chancellor	Term start	Term end	Time in office	Notes
1	Sir Sydney Schubert	1987	13 March 1990	2–3 years	
2	Elizabeth Nosworthy AO	13 March 1990	11 February 1992	1 year, 335 days^{a}	
3	Emeritus Professor Harry Messel AC, CBE	3 April 1992	31 December 1997	5 years, 272 days^{b}	
4	Dr Paul Scully-Power AM, DSM, NSM	1 January 1998	5 August 1999	1 year, 216 days	
5	Dr Imelda Roche AO	5 August 1999	30 May 2003	3 years, 298 days	
6	Dr Trevor C. Rowe AO	30 May 2003	22 May 2009	5 years, 357 days	
7	Dr Helen Nugent AO	22 May 2009	19 April 2016	6 years, 333 days	
8	The Hon. Dr Annabelle Bennett AO, SC	19 April 2016	24 May 2024	10 years, 211 days	
9	David Baxby	May 2024	incumbent	2 years, 176 days	

Notes
^a: Includes the period between March 1990 to 1991 when Nosworthy served as Acting Chancellor.
^b: Includes the period between 7 February 1993 to 2 March 1996 when Messel served as Executive Chancellor.

=== Vice-chancellors ===
Order	Officerholder	Title	Term start	Term end	Time in office	Notes
1	Professor Don Watts AM	Vice-chancellor and President	1 July 1987	30 June 1990	2 years, 364 days	
2	Professor Philip Lader	Vice-chancellor and President	29 July 1991	6 February 1993	1 year, 192 days	
3	Emeritus Professor Harry Messel AC, CBE	Executive Chancellor^{b}	7 February 1993	15 July 1995	2 years, 158 days	
4	Professor Raoul Mortley AO, FAHA	Vice-chancellor and President	1 August 1996	16 September 1997	1 year, 46 days	
5	Professor Ken Moores AM	Vice-chancellor and President	3 December 1997	31 December 2003	6 years, 28 days	
6	Emeritus Professor Robert Stable AM	Vice-chancellor and President	1 January 2004	31 December 2011	7 years, 364 days	
7	Professor Tim Brailsford	Vice-chancellor and President	1 January 2012	incumbent	14 years, 319 days	

== Faculty ==
Notable past and current faculty members include:

- Babette Bensoussan, competitive intelligence specialist
- Jonathan Crowe, legal philosopher
- David Day, historian
- Mike Grenby, journalist
- Terry Gygar, legal academic
- Peter Harrison, PhD DLitt historian
- Ken Harvey, medical researcher and academic
- Richard Hays, medical lecturer
- Jon Jenkins, virologist and information technologist
- L. Randolph Lowry III, political scientist
- Ingo Petzke, film scholar
- David Weedon, dermatopathologist
- Paul Wilson, criminologist
