= Monex =

Monex may refer to:

- Monex Group, a financial services company in Tokyo, Japan
- Monex Financial Services, a payment company in Killarney, Ireland
- Monex Precious Metals, a bullion dealer in Newport Beach, United States
- Holding Monex, a foreign exchange firm in Mexico City, Mexico
  - Monex Europe previously Schneider Foreign Exchange, a subsidiary of Holding Monex
- Monexgroup, a payment processing company in Toronto, Ontario
