= Mentone Grammar School =

Mentone Grammar

Location
- 63 Venice Street; Mentone, Victoria 3194; Australia
- 37°59′15″S 145°4′4″E

Information
- Type: Independent, co-educational, Anglican day school
- Motto: Latin: Labore et Honore (By work and with honour)
- Denomination: Anglican
- Established: 3 March 1923
- Chairperson: Ross Joblin
- Principal: Andy Müller (since 2024)
- Chaplain: Rev. Micheal Prabaharan & Rev. Andrew Stewart
- Years offered: ELC–12
- Gender: Co-educational (since 2006)
- Enrolment: 2,025 (ELC–12)
- Campus size: 7 hectares (70,000 m^{2})
- Colours: Navy blue, gold & white
- Affiliation: Associated Grammar Schools of Victoria
- Alumni: Mentonians
- Website: www.mentonegrammar.net

Mentone Grammar is an independent, Anglican co-educational grammar school in Mentone, a suburb of Melbourne, Victoria, Australia.

== History ==
Mentone Grammar was founded on 3 March 1923 by a group of Anglicans who had a high profile in the town, supported by the local Mentone Anglican vicar.

The school is renowned for its 'Together-Apart-Together' learning model, where classes are co-educational from ELC – Year 4 and from Years 10 – 12, with students learning in single-gender classes through Years 5 – 9.

As of 2025, annual fees for a Year 12 student studying at Mentone Grammar were slightly over $35,000.

== Heads ==
=== Headmasters/Principals ===
There have been a total of nine Principals (formerly Headmasters) of Mentone Grammar since the school was founded in 1923. The current Principal is Andy Müller (since 2024).

Years served	Name
1923–1931	Henry Lycett Tonkin
1931–1932	Royce Mayne
1933–1939	Charles Campbell Thorold
1939–1960	John Jeffery Thorold
1961–1987	Keith William Jones
1988–2003	Neville John William Clark MC OAM
2003–2006	Timothy Warren Argall
2007–2023	Malcolm Jack Cater
2024–present	Andy Müller

== Houses ==
The school has 10 houses as of 2025. Every student is put into a house group when they join, which becomes their homeroom class from year 10 – 12. Generally, siblings go in the same house. Houses have a house shirt, and used to have a house tie until the uniform redesign in 2023.

House	Main Colour	Accent Colour	Year founded	Notes
Anderson Army	Red	Black	1923	
Jones Jaguars	Navy blue	None	1923	
Were Warriors	Light Blue	None	1949	
Finlay Anderson Falcons	Yellow	None	1983	
White Wolves	Blue	Yellow	1983	
Lionel Large Lions	Green	Yellow	1990	
Deighton Devils	Black	Red	1990	
Drinan Dragons	Green	White	1957	Formerly 'School House' until 2000
Johnston Jets	Orange	None	2023	
Clark Crusaders	Purple	None	2023	

== Cadet Unit ==
The Mentone Grammar Army Cadet Unit (MGACU) is an Australian Army Cadets school-based unit, founded and operating continuously since 1943. It is part of the 31st Battalion (Melbourne Schools) and now represents the largest school-based Unit in Victoria.

Leadership is highly valued in the Unit and being part of the MGACU provides opportunities for Senior students to develop leadership skills, together with expertise in the areas of fieldcraft, first aid and navigation. All Year 9 students join the Cadets for one year then have the option to continue on in Years 10 (As Corporal or Advanced Cadet), 11 (As Sargent) and 12 (As CUO, RSM, and other roles) to further develop their skills, training and leadership of incoming recruits.

The cadet unit is split into numerous platoons (26 PLTs in 2025) which each typically consist of 6 – 20 Cadets, 3 – 4 Corporals, 1 Sargent and 1 CUO. The platoons generally only have people in the same school house.

== Sport ==
Former AFL player and coach, Brenton Sanderson commenced as the school's Director of Sport in 2023. Their sequential sports program provides opportunities for students of all abilities to benefit from elite coaching programs, established through partnerships with highly credentialled coaches, talent pathway programs and professional sporting clubs.

Saturday sport is compulsory for all students in Years 7–12, with boys competing in the Associated Grammar Schools of Victoria (AGSV) competition and girls in the combined AGSV / Associated Public Schools (APS) competition in both Summer and Winter sports.

On Saturday 29 January 2022, Mentone Grammar's 2022 Head Prefect, Evie Stansby made Mentone Grammar sporting history by becoming the first female to earn a place on their First XI cricket team.

=== AGSV and AGSV/APS premierships ===
Mentone Grammar has won the following AGSV and AGSV/APS premierships.

Boys:

- Athletics (6) – 1982, 1983, 1984, 1986, 1987, 1996
- Cricket (12) – 1965, 1966, 1975, 1984, 1986, 1987, 2000, 2002, 2007, 2012, 2015, 2017
- Golf – 2005
- Soccer – 1993
- Squash (2) – 2001, 2002
- Swimming (36) – 1965, 1966, 1967, 1968, 1969, 1970, 1971, 1972, 1973, 1974, 1975, 1976, 1977, 1978, 1979, 1982, 1983, 1984, 1985, 1986, 1987, 1995, 1996, 2003, 2004, 2005, 2006, 2010, 2011, 2012, 2014, 2015, 2016, 2017, 2018, 2019
- Table Tennis (4) – 2004, 2006, 2007, 2008
- Tennis (19) – 1961, 1966, 1974, 1976, 1979, 1980, 1981, 1982, 1983, 1984, 1985, 2000, 2001, 2002, 2003, 2005, 2006, 2012, 2016
- Volleyball (5) – 2010, 2016, 2018, 2019, 2023

Girls:

- Athletics (4) – 2019, 2022, 2023, 2024
- Cross Country (6) – 2017, 2018, 2019, 2022, 2023, 2024
- Swimming (7) – 2014, 2015, 2016, 2017, 2018, 2022, 2024
- Touch Football (8) – 2017, 2018, 2019, 2020, 2021, 2022, 2023, 2024

== Notable alumni and staff ==
=== Academic ===
- Hugh Stretton, Historian Professor of History, University of Adelaide

=== Administration ===
- Tim Brailsford, Vice-Chancellor and President of Bond University
- Karl Duldig (1902–1986), Austrian-Australian sculptor; art master from 1945–67
- Sir Robert Gillman Allen Jackson AC, KCVO, CMG, OBE, OWL, former United Nations administrator

=== Business ===
- Phil de Young OAM, Former economics teacher and later became headmaster of other schools
- James Riady, Deputy Chairman of the Lippo Group

=== Entertainment ===
- Lee Cormie, Australian Actor
- Jared Daperis, actor
- Daniel Daperis, actor
- Bill Granger, restaurateur and food writer
- Russell Hitchcock, lead singer of soft rock duo Air Supply
- Mal Walden, co-anchor of Melbourne's Channel 10 News at 5

=== Military ===
- Air Vice Marshal Richard Bomball AO AFC, Commandant of the Australian Defence Force Academy
- Major General Derek Deighton AO, MBE

=== Sport ===
- Joel Amartey, AFL player with the Sydney Swans
- Mitchell Brown, Geelong Football Club, Essendon Football Club player
- Gary Colling, former Australian rules football player for St Kilda Football Club
- Leigh Fisher, St Kilda Football Club player
- Oliver Florent, AFL player with the Sydney Swans
- Alex Hillhouse, Athlete, competed in 1932 Summer Olympics and 1930 British Empire Games
- Claudia Hollingsworth, Athlete
- Kate Hore, AFL Women's player with the Melbourne Football Club
- John Howat, former Melbourne Football Club & Richmond Football Club player
- Andrew Ilie, former Australian tennis player
- Abbi Moloney, AFL Women's player with the Collingwood Football Club
- Andrew Moir, Australian rules footballer
- Courteney Munn, AFL Women's player with the St Kilda Football Club
- Rod Owen, former Melbourne Football Club, Brisbane Bears Football Club and St Kilda Football Club footballer
- Mitchito Owens, AFL footballer
- John Peers, Australian Doubles Tennis player
- Jack Scrimshaw, AFL footballer
- Simon Storey, soccer player for Melbourne Victory
- Shane Warne, former Australian cricketer
- Dav Whatmore, former Australian cricketer
- David Wilson, 1988 Olympic swimmer

== See also ==
- Victorian Certificate of Education
- Australian Army Cadets
