= Annabelle Bennett =

Australian judge

The Honourable Dr Annabelle Bennett AC, SC, FAA

Judge of the Federal Court of Australia
- In office 5 May 2003 – 23 March 2016

8th Chancellor of Bond University
- In office 19 April 2016 – 24 May 2024
- Preceded by: Helen Nugent
- Succeeded by: David Baxby

Personal details
- Born: Annabelle Claire Darin; 8 January 1950 (age 76) Sydney, Australia
- Spouse: David Bennett (m. 1972)
- Children: 3
- Education: University of Sydney; University of New South Wales
- Occupation: Judge, lawyer

Annabelle Claire Bennett AC, SC, FAA (nee Darin; born 8 January 1950) is an Australian judge and lawyer, she was the eighth Chancellor of Bond University and former Judge of the Federal Court of Australia.

== Early life and education ==
Annabelle Claire Bennett (born Darin) was born on 8 January 1950 in Sydney, Australia, to Emanuel Darin (born Finkelstein) and Raissa Darin (born Atlas).

Bennett's father was a lawyer, and at an early age she had hopes of following him into the legal profession. Her father, however, thought that law was a bad career choice for women, because "you had to be better than the best to break even" and discouraged his daughter from pursuing this ambition. Instead, Bennett studied science at the University of Sydney and completed a Ph.D. in Biochemistry at the same institution.

In 1980, still interested in the legal profession, Bennett went on to study law at the University of New South Wales.

== Career ==
After graduating from the University of New South Wales, Bennett began practising as a barrister, specialising in intellectual property law.

Bennett was appointed to the Federal Court of Australia on 5 May 2003. Bennett was also an additional Judge of the Supreme Court of the Australian Capital Territory and a presidential member of the Administrative Appeals Tribunal. Bennett is arbitrator of the Court of Arbitration for Sport and was named for the special arbitration panel to operate during the 2016 Summer Olympics in Rio de Janeiro. Bennett retired from the Federal Court on 23 March 2016, and now practises as a consultant barrister, mediator and arbitrator at 5 Wentworth.

In April 2016, Bennett became the eighth Chancellor of Bond University in Queensland. After eight years in the role, she was replaced by David Baxby, a graduate of the university.

On 20 February 2020, Bennett was appointed as a commissioner to the Royal Commission into National Natural Disaster Arrangements.

In 2022, the Albanese government commissioned an Independent Review of Australian Carbon Credit Units, that reported in December 2022. The independent panel was composed of Ian Chubb AC (chair), Bennett, Ariadne Gorring, and Stephen Hatfield Dodds.

== Awards and honours ==
Bennett was made an Officer of the Order of Australia in 2005, for "service to the law, particularly in the areas of intellectual property, administrative law and professional conduct; and to the community through a range of educational, medical, women's and business organisations".

In 2011, she received the honorary degree of doctor of the university from the Australian National University.

She was upgraded to a Companion of the Order of Australia (AC) in the 2019 Queen's Birthday Honours. In 2016, she received an honorary Doctor of Laws degree from the University of New South Wales.

In May 2020 Bennett was elected Fellow of the Australian Academy of Science.

== Personal life ==
Annabelle Bennett is married to David Bennett, the former Commonwealth Solicitor-General.

Outside of the courtroom, Bennett's interest in biological sciences has continued, and she has been involved in a number of committees, including the Genetic Manipulation Advisory Committee, the Biotechnology Task Force and the Gene Patenting Advisory Committee of the Australian Law Reform Commission. She has also served as a Director of the Sydney Children's Hospital and Neuroscience Research Australia and is a former president of the Australian Academy of Forensic Sciences. In 2012, she was appointed Chair of the National Health and Medical Research Council.

Bennett is also a past President of Chief Executive Women, a former Trustee of the Centennial Park and Moore Park Trust.

Her daughter, Lyria Bennett Moses is a professor of law at the University of New South Wales.

Academic offices
Preceded by Helen Nugent	Chancellor of Bond University; 2016–2024	Succeeded by David Baxby
