= Global Blue =

Swiss financial services company

Global Blue Group
- Type: Public Company
- Traded as: NYSE: GB
- Founded: 1980; 46 years ago
- Founders: Alf Näslund
- Headquarters: Eysins, Switzerland
- Area served: Worldwide
- Key people: Christian Lucas (Chairman), Jacques Stern (CEO)
- Products: VAT/GST refunds, dynamic currency conversion, POS and retail technologies, customer intelligence, marketing services and publications, training and education, consultancy
- Number of employees: +2,100 (2023)
- Website: www.globalblue.com

Global Blue is a tourism shopping tax refund company headquartered in Nyon, Switzerland. The company is best known for tax-free shopping, a VAT/GST refund product and also operates in dynamic currency conversion, marketing services, point-of-sale technology, retail staff education, and customer intelligence. It is the industry leader for providing tax refunds.

As of 2014, some 130 countries levy VAT/GST, about 50 offer to refund VAT/GST to tourists for private exports.

== History ==
Started in Sweden in 1980, tax-free shopping is about refunding the VAT/GST levied in normal stores on the high street to non-resident visitors who will privately export the goods purchased, according to the legislation in the European Union and other countries.

Founded as Sweden Tax Free Shopping, the company later became Europe Tax Free Shopping and then Global Refund in 1998. The company was bought out by its management in partnership with Apax Partners, which took a majority stake, and FEXCO for £118 million in 1999.

In 2007, Apax sold the company to Equistone Partners Europe (at the time Barclays Private Equity), which valued the company at €360 million. Previously operating the two brands Tax Free Shopping and First Currency Choice, Global Refund completed its repositioning, product diversification and rebranding as Global Blue in 2010.

Equistone Partners sold the business in May 2012, for 1 billion euros to the technology private equity firm Silver Lake, with Swiss private equity house Partners Group taking a minority stake. On 10 April 2014 Global Blue announced the appointment of David Baxby, as chief executive officer and a member of the board of directors, taking over from Per Setterberg, who had run the company for 25 years. Following David Baxby a new CEO, Jaques Stern, has been announced on 18 May 2015.

In 2010, Global Blue and the Economist Intelligence Unit started to use the expression 'globe shopper' to identify the market segment of "people who consider shopping as a fundamental part of their travel experience". Global Blue Intelligence's globe shopping data and publications are referenced by international and national media including the Financial Times, The Wall Street Journal, City A.M., the Moodie Report, China Confidential and The Hurun Wealth Report.

In 2010, the Inland Revenue Authority of Singapore commissioned Global Blue to develop and operate Singapore's Electronic Tourist Refund Scheme. In 2011, the Australian Customs and Border Protection Service selected Global Blue as the payment supplier for tax-free shopping in Australia. In July 2013, Global Blue announced a joint venture with NTT DATA to offer tax-free shopping services in Japan. Global Blue is also a certified supplier of the China National Tourism Administration (CNTA) Quality Service Certification programme.

In February 2025, Shift4 announced that they would be purchasing the company for $2.5 billion. On July 3, this transaction was completed.

== Operations ==
Global Blue employs around 2,100 people in 53 countries, and provides services to approximately 300,000 merchants (retailers, hotels, restaurants, etc.), and banks in these locations.
