= Goodbody Stockbrokers =

Irish stockbroking firm

- Industry: Financial services
- Founded: 26 April 1876; 149 years ago
- Founder: Robert Goodbody; Jonathan Goodbody
- Headquarters: Dublin, Ireland
- Key people: Martin Tormey (Chief executive officer)
- Parent: Allied Irish Banks
- Website: goodbody.ie

Goodbody Stockbrokers is Ireland's longest established stockbroking firm with roots dating back to 1877. As well as being one of the leading institutional brokers, it is one of the largest private client firms in Ireland. It is a member firm of the Irish Stock Exchange and a SETS participant of the London Stock Exchange. The company has offices in Dublin, London, Galway and Cork. It employs over 300 people and sold its 26.2 per cent of the Irish Stock Exchange in 2018.

Ireland has two large (one of which is Goodbody) and half a dozen medium-sized brokerages. A 2013 report by the Central Bank of Ireland noted the likelihood and possible risks of future mergers among firms.

Goodbody was formerly owned by Irish financial services firm Fexco, which held a 51% interest, and by members of Goodbody's management and staff, who owned the remaining 49%. In November 2019, the Bank of China reached an agreement with Goodbody to purchase all of its shares for €155 million. In March 2020, the Central Bank of Ireland approved the proposed sale. The transaction was then expected to close in early summer 2020, contingent upon additional required regulatory approvals. However this deal fell through, and in March 2021 Allied Irish Banks agreed to buy the stockbroker for €138m. The acquisition was completed on 1 September 2021.

== History ==
=== Goodbody family ===
The Goodbody family had ventured in milling, tobacco, and manufacturing. In 1807, Robert Goodbody married into the Pim family, who had investments in shipping, insurance, banking, mining, and railways. Robert set up a milling company of his own and fathered five sons, all of whom went on to set up relatively successful businesses. One of those sons, Marcus, married Hannah Perry, daughter of James Perry, a successful businessman with investments in iron, railways, and brewing. Their first child, Robert, went on to found the Goodbody Stockbroking company. Robert originally passed the bar exam, and married into the Pim family, like his grandfather. The Pim family, however, did not like the idea of their daughter marrying a lawyer, so, Goodbody embarked on a career in stockbroking.

=== The business begins ===
On 13 November 1874, Goodbody attended a meeting of the Dublin Stock Exchange, and his license to start his business was approved. Two years later, on 26 April 1876, Robert's cousin, Jonathan, joined him to form R&J Goodbody.

=== Paths separate ===
In 1885, Robert departed Ireland for New York City, and R&J Goodbody was dissolved. Jonathan became partners with Theodore Richard Webb, a fellow Quaker, to create Goodbody & Webb. In New York, Robert partnered with Charles Dow, forming Goodbody, Glynn & Dow. Dow went on to found the Wall Street Journal. By 1891, both men parted ways. Robert started his own firm entitled Robert Goodbody & Co, which became the fifth largest brokerage firm in the United States, before being bought by Merrill Lynch in 1971.

=== Goodbody & Webb era: 1885–1976 ===
Jonathan retired from Goodbody & Webb in 1928, being succeeded by his son, Denis, along with his cousin, Jack Freeman. Denis remained a Dublin Stock Exchange partner until 1970. Freeman was chairman of the Provincial Bank of Ireland, which joined with Munster and Leinster to form Allied Irish Banks. In 1974, Goodbody & Webb became the first Irish firm to open an office in London.

=== Merger era: 1976–1990 ===
Goodbody & Webb merged with Wilkinson & Faulkner and was renamed to Goodbody & Wilkinson. In 1985, the firm merged with Dudgeon, becoming Goodbody Dudgeon. A UK partner, James Capel, purchased a 40% stake in the firm. James Capel was the broking subsidiary of the Hong Kong & Shanghai Bank. In 1990, the company changed names yet again, this time to Goodbody Stockbrokers, following a purchase by AIB Capital Markets.

=== Goodbody Stockbrokers era: 1990–present ===
In 2010, Goodbody was acquired by FEXCO for €24 million. The Financial Times commented that the lowly price tag placed on Ireland’s oldest stockbroker and "one-time bastion of Ireland’s Protestant business elite" was just another measure of the dramatic decline of the Irish economy. Allied Irish Banks were likely to have had to indemnify Fexco, the new majority owners of Goodbody Stockbrokers, against any legal action arising from the firm's boom-time trading. The deal saw the broker’s own management take a 25 per cent stake in the business. Today, of the original 19th-century brokerage firms, only Goodbody has survived.

== Controversies ==
A Northern Ireland property fund which was launched by Goodbody in 2005 had its value of investments written down to nil in 2009. A solicitor said the fund invested in residential property, even though his client had said she did not want any exposure to residential property. The stockbrokers made £1.1 million in commission from the £27 million put up by investors at the outset.

The broker was ridiculed publicly in 2007 after it told its clients to buy an American pharma stock at $3.09 and gave it a price target of $5.70. Less than a week later, it was recommending that the same clients sell the same stock when it was trading at $0.83.

In May 2010 the EU began investigating claims that AIB misused state aid by attaching conditions to loan deals, unfairly affecting competition in the Irish stockbroking market but benefiting Goodbody.

== Awards ==
In the 2011 Extel Survey, Goodbody Stockbrokers took four of the seven awards on offer for Ireland, taking two of the four company awards and two of the three individual awards.

In the 2011 Starmine Awards, the Food and Beverage Analyst Liam Igoe, of Goodbody, was ranked sixth in the Top 10 Earnings Estimators in Europe.

== List of main Competitors ==
- Davy Group
- Cantor Fitzgerald
- Bank of Ireland
- Brewin Dolphin
- St. James's Place plc
- Investec
