= Derek Deighton =

Australian general

- Born: 21 November 1930; Kandy, Ceylon
- Died: 16 April 1991 (aged 60); Melbourne, Victoria
- Military career
- Allegiance: Australia
- Branch: Australian Army
- Service years: 1949–1987
- Rank: Major General
- Service number: 335044
- Commands: Logistics Command
- Conflicts: Korean War; Vietnam War
- Awards: Officer of the Order of Australia; Member of the Order of the British Empire

Major General Derek Christopher John Deighton, AO, MBE (21 November 1930 – 16 April 1991) was a senior officer of the Australian Army. He was the brother of Brigadier John Deighton MC.

== Early life ==
Deighton attended Mentone Grammar School, and graduated from the Royal Military College, Duntroon in 1952.

== Australian Army ==
Derek served overseas in Korea during 1953–54, Japan, UK, Germany, and Vietnam (during war 1967–68).

Deighton served as the Chief of Staff Logistics Command 1978–1979 and finally as General Officer Commanding Logistics Command.

As of 2015, Derek is one of three Royal Australian Corps of Transport officers to reach the rank of major general.
