= Lyria Bennett Moses =

Australian lawyer and legal academic

Lyria Bennett Moses is an Australian lawyer and legal academic. She is a Professor and Head of the School of Law, Society and Criminology in the University of New South Wales.

== Education ==
Bennett Moses attended Ascham School in Sydney where she awarded equal Dux of her year and scoring a tertiary entrance rank of 100 in the HSC in 1993. She was one of 14 students with a perfect tertiary entrance rank. Bennett Moses has degrees in Science and Law from University of New South Wales, with First Class Honours and the University Medal in Pure Mathematics. While living in New York City, she obtained a masters degree from Columbia Law School.

== Personal life ==
Moses is the daughter of two prominent Australian lawyers, Annabelle Bennett, former Judge of the Federal Court of Australia and David Bennett, former Solicitor-General of Australia.
