= Patrick Baynes =

American entrepreneur

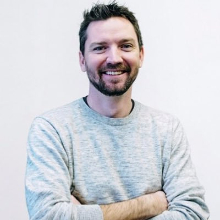
- Born: Patrick Ryan Baynes; October 11, 1984 (age 41); Wausau, Wisconsin, United States
- Education: Creighton University; Alfred University; Bond University
- Employer(s): PeopleLinx (Co-founder, Head of Partnerships)
- Known for: LinkedIn, PeopleLinx
- Parent: Father: Colonel (Ret.d) US Army
- Relatives: 1x brother (Army Ranger)
- Awards: Jonathan Allen Award for Leadership, Alfred University (Scholarship - May 2003); 40 Under 40, Philadelphia Business Journal (March 2014)
- Website: PeopleLinx

Patrick Baynes (born October 11, 1984) is an American entrepreneur. He worked at LinkedIn and is known for being the co-founder of PeopleLinx, and the founder of UpdatesCentral.

== Biography ==
Baynes was born in Wausau, Wisconsin. Due to this father's job in the US Army, he kept moving to places including Chicago and Atlanta, Georgia. After graduating from Alfred University with a BSBA in Marketing, he studied at Bond University on Australia's Gold Coast.

Baynes is a speaker on Internet business strategy, go-to-market strategy and strategic consulting, as well as personal strategies for individuals to raise their profile and develop business using social networking.

== Career ==
=== Early career ===
Baynes joined LinkedIn in 2007.

=== PeopleLinx ===
While working at LinkedIn together, Baynes and Nathan Egan pitched to LinkedIn's board the idea of offering professional services. After the proposal was turned down, Baynes and Egan co-founded Philadelphia-based PeopleLinx in 2009. With the aim to help large corporate organizations and their employees get the most out of social networks, during the first two years of operations the company offered LinkedIn-focused consulting and training programs, but the primarily Fortune 500 corporate customers wanted something with scale that would offer continued engagement beyond the training, together with associated metrics of success. The result was the SaaS-based PeopleLinx, the world's first engagement, social selling, and analytics software for social media.

As Head of Partnerships, Baynes was responsible for all client-facing services, partnerships and social sales strategy. Having founded and developed the company through financial bootstrapping, in May 2012 state-funded economic-development organization the Ben Franklin Technology Partners of Southeastern Pennsylvania approved a $150,000 investment in the firm. In March 2013, PeopleLinx raised $3.2 million in a series A funding round from both angel investors and investment firms, including Bala Cynwyd-based Osage Venture Partners; New York-based Greycroft Partners; and Center City-based Mission Operators Group.

=== Game Time Updates ===
In 2015, Baynes left PeopleLinx and co-founded Game Time Updates with Michael Coupe and developer Will Dyson. Game Time Updates is a social media automated marketing software and tool for the restaurant, bar and beverage industry. It helps businesses monetize social following, provide quality content for social media management, along with reporting and brand partnership opportunities with college and professional sports teams.

=== UpdatesCentral ===
Baynes founded UpdatesCentral in June 2009. The company provided customer engagement and lead generation services for social media. Baynes serves as the CEO of UpdatesCentral. In 2011, Will Dyson joined as CTO and in 2014, Michael Coupe joined as co-founder and COO. The company was officially launched in January 2015, and had 500 small business clients and published 2,000 to 3,000 social media posts a day by 2017.

== Awards ==
- May 2003: Jonathan Allen Award for Leadership, Alfred University (scholarship)
- March 2014: 40 Under 40, Philadelphia Business Journal
- April 2014: Cool Vendors in Content and Social Analytics, Gartner
- October 2016: Marcum Innovator of the Year finalist, Marcum
