= David Bennett (barrister) =

Australian barrister and public servant

David Michael John Bennett AC KC

Solicitor-General of Australia
- In office 1998–2008
- Appointed by: John Howard
- Preceded by: Henry Burmester (acting)
- Succeeded by: Stephen Gageler

Personal details
- Born: David Michael John Bennett; 22 December 1941 (age 84) Amersham, Buckinghamshire, England, United Kingdom
- Spouse: Annabelle Bennett
- Children: Lyria, Tala, Paul
- Education: University of Sydney; Harvard Law School
- Occupation: Barrister, Solicitor-General of Australia

David Michael John Bennett AC, KC (born 22 December 1941) is an Australian barrister and former Solicitor-General of Australia.

== Early years ==
Bennett was born in Amersham, Buckinghamshire to Louis Bennett and Lily Bennett (née Black). He was educated at the Hall School in Hampstead, then moved with his family to Australia in 1951 and attended the Scots College, Sydney. He subsequently attained degrees in Arts and Law (with honours) from the University of Sydney and an LLM and SJD from Harvard Law School. His father, Louis Bennett, was a distinguished solicitor in Sydney, and as a Provost Major was in charge of the escort that took the Nazi Oberkommando der Wehrmacht to Nuremberg for trial. Bennet's Aunt Major Jane Bennett served at the GCCS at Bletchley Park where the British broke several Nazi codes.

== Career ==
Bennett was a solicitor from 1964 to 1967. He was called to the New South Wales bar in 1967, and was appointed King's Counsel in 1979.

He was president of the Australian Bar Association from 1995 to 1996 and of the New South Wales Bar Association from 1995 to 1997. Bennett was president of the Association of Lawyer Arbitrators and Mediates in 1998 and President of the Australian Academy of Forensic Sciences from 1999 to 2001. He was Solicitor-General of Australia from 1998 to 2008. Bennett was awarded the Centenary Medal in 2003.

In a September 2011, Sydney Morning Herald article he addressed international agreement-making by writing that: "A non-binding promise by Australia or the US is worth more than a binding undertaking by Nazi Germany or Stalinist Russia."

== Personal life ==
He is married to Annabelle Bennett, a former judge of the Federal Court of Australia. Their daughter Lyria Bennett Moses is a professor of law at the University of New South Wales.

Government offices
Preceded by Gavan Griffith	Solicitor-General of Australia; 1998–2008	Succeeded by Stephen Gageler
