= Tommy Spaulding =

American writer (born 1969)

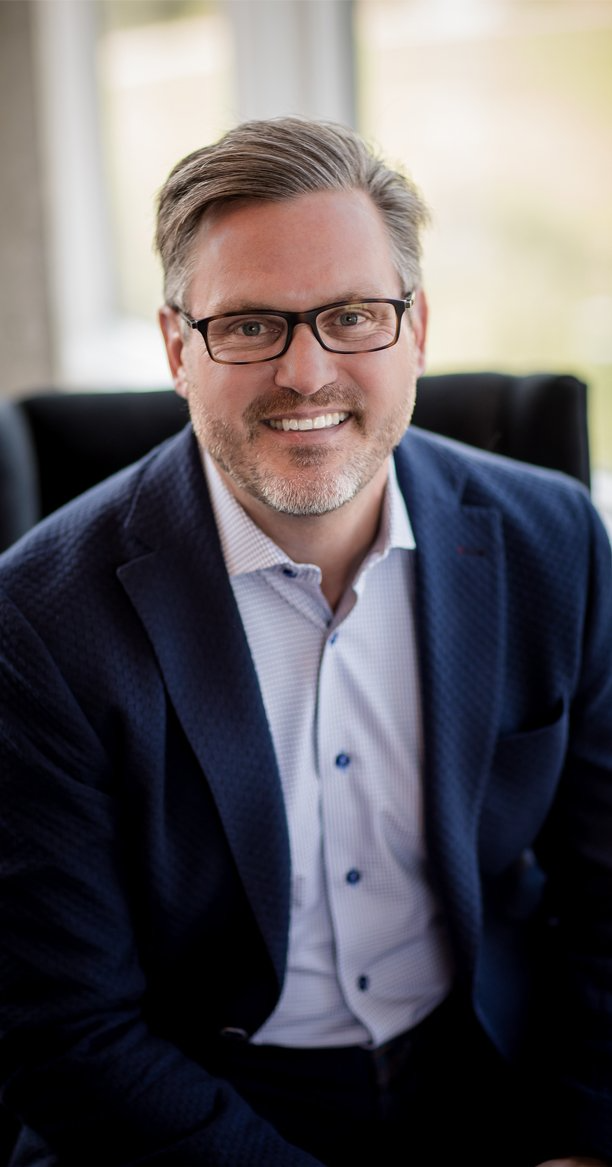
- Born: August 31, 1969 (age 56); Suffern, New York
- Occupations: New York Times Bestselling Author, Leadership Speaker, Thought Leader, and President, Tommy Spaulding Companies LLC
- Website: www.tommyspaulding.com

Thomas J. Spaulding Jr. (August 31, 1969) is an American author and president of Tommy Spaulding Companies LLC. His book It's Not Just Who You Know was released on August 10, 2010. Spaulding is also the former CEO and President of, Up with People, and founded Leader's Challenge, a high school civics program in the state of Colorado.

== Early life and education ==
Thomas J. Spaulding Jr. was born in Suffern, New York and attended Suffern High School, graduating in 1987 as an Eagle Scout and senior class president. He completed a BA degree in Political Science at East Carolina University (ECU) in 1992. At ECU Tommy was named senior class president and was the head of 12 different organizations and was asked to speak at commencement. At graduation he received the Most Outstanding Leader award and in 2006 was awarded the Outstanding Alumni Award, the highest honor given to an East Carolina alumnus. Later he received an MBA from Bond University, where he was a Rotary Ambassadorial Scholar in 1998 and a MA in Non-Profit Management from Regis University in 2005 where he was a Colorado Trust Fellow.

== Early career and travels to Japan ==
After graduating from East Carolina, Spaulding became the Business Partner Sales Manager at IBM/Lotus Development and a member of the Japan Exchange and Teaching (JET) program where he worked with the staff of the 1998 Winter Olympics in Nagano, Japan. Spaulding also served as a U.S. Congressional Intern and a member of Bob Dole’s 1996 presidential campaign. Soon after his work on the campaign, Spaulding was named the Director of Corporate Affiliates for Up with People.

== Founding major businesses ==
In 2000, Spaulding founded Leader's Challenge which grew to become the largest high school civics and leadership program in the state of Colorado before shutting down due to financial difficulties in 2009. Spaulding later co-founded the Center for Third Sector Excellence, a non-profit leadership organization that was the impetus behind the National Leadership Institute. At this time he also founded Dialogue for Tomorrow, a conference promoting the teaching of global leadership in young adults throughout different countries.

=== CEO of Up With People ===
Spaulding continued to be involved in leadership throughout the early 2000s. In 2003 he became a graduate of the Leadership Program of the Rockies, "America’s premier institute to develop, strengthen, train and equip emerging leaders to reach new heights" and in 2005 he graduated from Leadership Denver, which "brings together leaders to discuss and learn about the challenges facing the Denver Metro area and for the purpose of expanding their commitment to voluntary civic responsibility." In July, 2005 Spaulding was named CEO and President of the non-profit global leadership program, Up With People. He became the youngest CEO in the organization's 42-year history.

=== Spaulding Companies and Spaulding Leadership Institute ===
After stepping down as CEO and President of Up with People, Spaulding created Spaulding Companies, LLC, a for-profit company and Spaulding Leadership Institute, a non-profit organization. Both corporations are umbrella organizations with focus areas in consulting, speaking and books as well as leadership development programs, respectively. The consulting side of the business, whose guiding principle is "put people first and business will follow" has worked with countless corporations, universities, foundations and non-profits and works to develop "a leadership and service vision for their organization." As a speaker, Tommy Spaulding has spoken to hundreds of organizations, schools, and corporations on four continents and was called "one of the most inspirational and talented speakers in the country" by Ken Blanchard, author of more than 30 leadership books including The One Minute Manager. Spaulding Leadership Institute runs two youth leadership programs, The National Leadership Institute, and Kid's Challenge.

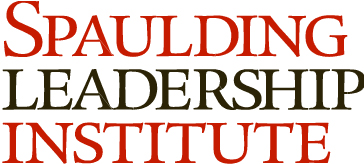

- National leadership academy|National Leadership Academy is a four-day summer program held in Denver, Colorado, which "engages high school students in leadership training, service learning and civic engagement through participation in an intensive Summer Academy."
- Kid's Challenge is a program currently in development which is designed to engage and immerse elementary school children in some basic leadership and learning activities.

Both of the leadership programs are non-profit organizations and are run out of the Denver Metropolitan Area by Tommy and his staff.

=== Personal life ===
Tommy Spaulding currently lives in the Denver Metropolitan area with his family.

== Book and Upcoming Book Tour ==
Tommy Spaulding has written a book titled It's Not Just Who You Know: Transform Your Life (And Your Organization) By Turning Colleagues and Contacts Into Lasting, Genuine Relationships published by Random House with a foreword by Ken Blanchard. The book's release date was August 10, 2010 and has been described as "the new How to Win Friends and Influence People for the twenty-first century." The candid and revealing book shows readers how to "take them one step further to accomplish the impossible in [their] lives and careers." Spaulding explains that "every relationship is a two-way street; we never know when a chance encounter can change the direction of a person's life." The purpose of the book is described as showing the reader "how... to expand our worlds and achieve our goals, and make a difference in our jobs, our careers, and our communities."
