= Holding Monex =

Mexican foreign exchange company

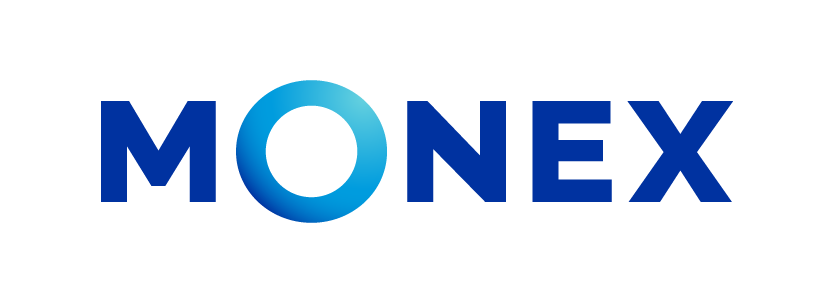
- Type: Private company
- Traded as: BMV: MONEXB
- Industry: Financial services
- Founded: 1985
- Headquarters: Mexico City, Mexico
- Key people: Héctor Lagos Dondé; (president and CEO); Héctor Lagos Cué; (founder and honorary chairman), Mauricio Naranjo; (assistant managing director of Monex Internacional), Moisés Tiktin Nickin; (executive managing director of business), Javier Cayón de la Vega; (executive managing director of operations and finance)
- Products: Foreign exchange, international transactions, payment services, deposits, trade finance, loans, prepaid cards, remittances
- Revenue: 4.47bn Mxn (2012)
- Net income: 1.03bn Mxn (2012)
- Website: Company website

Holding Monex is a Mexican foreign exchange company that specializes in international transactions and payment services for commercial clients. It is one of the largest dedicated foreign exchange companies providing a number of payment and forex related financial services to both companies and individuals.

== History ==
=== Founding ===
Holding Monex was founded in 1985 by Hector Lagos Donde, who still serves as company president. Holding Monex (also known as Monex) was founded as a conglomerate, which now includes Grupo Financiero Monex, Intermex, Sí Vale, and recently acquired Tempus Inc., and Monex Europe.

The group is one of the world's largest providers of commercial foreign exchange, delivering over 5 million annual transactions including international payments and foreign exchange, representing an annual volume of US$190bn. By 2010, the company had 43 offices, including one in Houston, Texas, and served more than 40,000 clients. It also provides banking services to foreigners visiting or doing business in Mexico.

=== Public company ===
In 2010, Holding Monex became listed on the Mexican Stock Exchange with an initial public offering of 391.11 million shares worth a total of 2.198 million pesos, with 50,000 Series A shares representing the capital fixed minimum and 399 million retired 950,000 shares of Series B corresponding to the variable. It entered the market with four direct subsidiaries: Monex Grupo Financiero, Pagos Intermex, Prestaciones Universales, and AdmiMonex. That year, Holding Monex also acquired Tempus Consulting, Inc. Monex joined the exchange as a part of the Sociedad Anónima Promotora de Inversión Bursátil program as the second company to do so in the history of the program.

In 2011, the company participated in a program to guarantee homes to 20,000 untaxed or informal workers in Mexico, an initiative launched by Mexican President Felipe Calderon. By 2013, Holding Monex was operating in forty cities, operating in the US, Europe, and Mexico. In July 2012, it acquired UK based retail foreign exchange provider Schneider Foreign Exchange, this became its European subsidiary when it was renamed Monex Europe.

== Operations and financials ==
Monex is a publicly quoted company (BMV: MONEXB) headquartered in Mexico with assets of US$2.8 billion, net assets of US$280 million and 2,310 employees across operations in Mexico, the United States and Europe. Monex maintains open trade credit lines and credit for US$280 million, has US$379m in Assets Under Management in private and public funds, and holds US$2.9bn of client investments. Monex is a financially regulated entity in all the countries in which it operates including the United States, Mexico, the United Kingdom and Spain. It has 392.7 million outstanding shares amongst its investors and a market cap of $7.3 billion.

=== Qualifications ===
In November 2012, the Fitch Group issued an "A (mex)" rating on its scale for Holding Monex and stock certificates under the ticker MONEX 12. It also issued similar ratings for its subsidiaries Banco Monex SA, Institución de Banca Múltiple, and for Monex Casa de Bolsa, SA. In 2013, Standard & Poor's affirmed its ratings of "mxA" and "mxA-2" for Holding Monex as well.

=== Certifications ===
Grupo Financiero Monex has an International Standard of Quality ISO 9001:2000 Certification in Prevention of Money Laundering and Integral Risk Management, for money laundering prevention for each of its financial products. This certification was also given to Monex Securities, a subsidiary of Monex Casa de Bolsa, Monex Grupo Financiero based in Houston, Texas. It is the only Mexican international stock broker with the certification. Monex also has an International Standard of Quality ISO 27001:2000 Certification, in the Safety Management System of Information, for the protection of confidentiality, integrity and availability of information of Grupo Financiero Monex's customers in their information systems.

Monex is at risk of losing these certifications after thousands, if not millions of dollars went missing from clients:,

=== Corporate social responsibility ===
The Mexican Center for Philanthropy and AliaRSE has granted Monex its Socially Responsible Company award. It has also been selected as one of the best companies to work for in Mexico by the Great Place to Work Institute.

In 2005, Grupo Financiero Monex joined the ONU Global Compact that promotes positive activity in the areas of human rights, labor rights, environmental rights, transparency, and anti-corruption.

In 2011, the company participated in a program to provide households to 20,000 informal workers in Mexico, an initiative launched by Mexican President Felipe Calderon.

== 2012 Federal election in Mexico ==
During the 2012 Federal Election in Mexico, it was alleged that pre-paid Monex cards were distributed by the Institutional Revolutionary Party (PRI) to prospective voters before the election and that Monex may have facilitated the funnelling of illegal campaign contributions the PRI through the accounts of its customers. However, the TEPJF, Mexico's highest election-law court, ruled unanimously to reject the allegations of fraud. They ruled that there was "no proven vote buying, no evident coercion or illicit inducement."
