= Northern University Games =

Multi-sport competition between universities in Australia

Coordinates: 27°27′47.09″S 153°00′33.33″E

The Northern University Games (NUG) is an Australian inter-varsity multi-sport competition held annually in mid-year break (June/July in Australia) between universities and tertiary institutions from Queensland, Northern Territory and northern New South Wales. The games attract on average 600 competitors every year across seven different sports. It was first held in 2005.

== Participants ==
In 2009, the following universities competed at the Games:

- Australian Catholic University
- Bond University
- Central Queensland University
- Griffith University
- Griffith University, Gold Coast
- Queensland University of Technology
- Southern Cross University
- The University of Queensland
- University of Southern Queensland
- University of the Sunshine Coast

== Sport Results ==
Winners with an * denotes runners-up to a foreign touring team.

=== Australian Football ===
Year	Host city	Winner
2005	Cairns	Queensland University of Technology

=== Baseball ===
Year	Host city	Winner
2005	Cairns	Queensland University of Technology

=== Basketball ===
Year	Host city	Men's Winner	Women's Winner
2005	Cairns	Queensland University of Technology	James Cook University

=== Golf ===
Year	Host city	Men's Winner	Women's Winner
2005	Cairns	Griffith University, Gold Coast	Griffith University, Gold Coast

=== Hockey ===
Year	Host city	Men's Winner	Women's Winner
2005	Cairns	Queensland University of Technology	Queensland University of Technology

=== Netball ===
Year	Host city	Mixed Winner	Women's Winner
2005	Cairns	Bond University	University of Queensland

=== Rugby League 7's ===
Year	Host city	Men's Winner
2005	Cairns	University of New England

=== Rugby Union ===
Year	Host city	Men's Winner
2005	Cairns	University of New England

=== Soccer ===
Year	Host city	Men's Winner	Women's Winner
2005	Cairns	University of Queensland	University of Queensland*

=== Squash ===
Year	Host city	Men's Winner	Women's Winner
2005	Cairns	Queensland University of Technology	Griffith University

=== Tennis ===
Year	Host city	Men's Winner	Women's Winner
2005	Cairns	Queensland University of Technology	University of Queensland

=== Touch Football ===
Year	Host city	Men's Winner	Women's Winner	Mixed Winner
2005	Cairns	Queensland University of Technology	Queensland University of Technology	University of Queensland, Gatton

=== Volleyball ===
Year	Host city	Men's Winner	Women's Winner
2005	Cairns	James Cook University	University of Queensland*

=== Water Polo ===
Year	Host city	Men's Winner	Women's Winner
2005	Cairns	University of Queensland	University of Queensland
