= Helen Nugent =

Australian company director, businesswoman and former academic (born 1949)

Helen Marion Nugent AC (born 13 February 1949) is an Australian company director, businesswoman, and former academic.

== Early life and education ==
Helen Marion Nugent was born on 13 February 1949.

Nugent completed a Bachelor of Arts with First Class Honours and a PhD from the University of Queensland (UQ), and earned a Master of Business Administration with Distinction from the Harvard Business School.

== Early career ==
She taught Indian history and Asian culture at UQ from 1971 to 1980. She was professor in management and director of the MBA Program at the Australian Graduate School of Management at the University of New South Wales from 1992 to 1994, where she also taught courses in strategic management.

After undertaking her MBA, she commenced her business career at McKinsey & Company, where until 1991 she was a partner specialising in financial services and the energy and resources sectors. Subsequently, from 1994 to 1999, as Director of Strategy at Westpac Banking Corporation, reporting to the CEO, Bob Joss, she was a member of the Executive Team, responsible for a major turnaround in the Bank's performance.

== Company director ==
Nugent currently serves as chairman of Ausgrid and a Non-Executive Director of IAG. Previously, she has been Chairman of Veda Group, Australian Rail Track Corporation, Swiss Re (Australia), Funds SA, and Sydney Airport. In addition, she has been a Non-Executive Director of Macquarie Group (for 15 years, until 2014), Origin Energy (for 14 years, until 2017), Carter Holt Harvey, Mercantile Mutual, State Bank of New South Wales, Herbert Smith Freehills, and Australia Post.

== Community organisation management ==
In the arts, Nugent was chair of the 1999 Major Performing Arts Inquiry, often referred to as the Nugent Inquiry or Nugent Review. David Gonski was a member of the committee.

She also chaired the federal government's National Opera Review. She was deputy chair of Opera Australia, Deputy Chairman of the Australia Council, and chaired the Major Performing Arts Board of the Australia Council.

She was appointed Chancellor of Bond University in 2009, at which time she was also a director of the Garvan Institute of Medical Research. She has also been president of Cranbrook School, and a member of Council of Monash University. She was also a member of the panel that reviewed Australian higher education for the Department of Education, Employment and Workplace Relations in 2008.

From 1 January 2017 she has been chair of the National Disability Insurance Agency and on 1 July 2019 began a two-year term as chair of the National Portrait Gallery of Australia.

== Honours ==
In 2001 Nugent was awarded a Centenary Medal and in 2004 was made an Officer of the Order of Australia (AO) "for service to the performing arts, to business and the financial services industry, particularly in the area of corporate governance and to the community". Nugent was promoted to Companion (AC) in the 2022 Australia Day Honours for "eminent service to people with disability through leadership of social and economic policy reform and implementation, to business, to the arts, and to the community".

In recognition of her community contribution and career, in 2009 she was awarded an Honorary Doctorate of Business by the University of Queensland; and in 2018 Bond University awarded her an Honorary Doctorate.

Academic offices
Preceded by Trevor Rowe	Chancellor of Bond University; 2009-2016	Succeeded by Annabelle Bennett
