= Richard Hays (health sciences) =

Australian professor and administrator

Professor Richard Hays is the current Professor of Medical Education and Dean of Medicine at the University of Tasmania, Australia, and was formerly Dean of Medicine at Bond University Australia, James Cook University and Keele University England.

== Books ==
- Practice-Based Teaching 2E, by Richard Hays, Eruditions Publishing, Melbourne Australia (2006)
- Teaching and Learning in Clinical Settings, by Richard Hays, Eruditions Publishing, Melbourne Australia, 2007)
- Practising Rural Medicine in Australia, by Richard Hays, Eruditions Publishing, Melbourne Australia (2002)
- Teaching and Learning in Primary Care by Lesley Southgate and Richard Hays (2005)
- Handbook of Rural Medicine in Australia by David Wilkinson, Richard Hays, Roger Strasser, and Paul Worley (2004)
