= Mike Grenby =

Mike Grenby was a Canadian academic and journalist. He was an emeritus professor of communications at Bond University.

Educated at the University of British Columbia and Columbia University's Graduate School of Journalism, Grenby worked for The Vancouver Sun, a daily newspaper, and began a column on personal money advice which at its peak appeared weekly in 54 newspapers across Canada. He has published several books on the topic of personal finance. He moved to Australia in 1998 to take a one-year position as Visiting Journalist and stayed on to continue teaching journalism and to introduce and teach the Core subject, Public Speaking: Presentation Skills for Leaders, which won a national, Australian Learning and Teaching Council, award. He established both another undergraduate subject (The Unfair Advantage) and also a graduate course on public speaking which has been reported on by the Harvard Business Review and the Australian Financial Review. He regularly delivers this oral presentation skills workshop internationally – at institutions ranging from the University of Cambridge and the London School of Economics, to Tsinghua University, the Royal University of Bhutan and the Osaka Convention & Tourism Bureau, to the Hwange Main Camp Bush School in Zimbabwe. He also writes travel articles, has more than 270,000 readers on TripAdvisor and is a member of the Harvard Business Review Advisory Council.

Mike Grenby died 3 July 2019. He was survived by his son Matthew. His longtime wife, Mandy, had predeceased him in 2001.
