= Jonathan Crowe =

Australian legal philosopher

Jonathan George Crowe (born 1979) is an Australian legal philosopher. He is Research Professor of Law and Justice at the University of Southern Queensland. Crowe is recognised internationally for his work on the natural law tradition in legal, moral and political philosophy. He is known in Australia for his advocacy on behalf of survivors of sexual violence.

== Career ==
Crowe commenced his academic career at the University of Queensland, before taking up a full professorship at Bond University and later becoming Dean of Law and Justice at the University of Southern Queensland. He has held visiting positions at the University of Texas at Austin and Georgetown University. He holds a PhD in law and philosophy from the University of Queensland.

Crowe is an Honorary Life Member of the Australasian Society of Legal Philosophy, having served as its president from 2014 to 2018 (succeeding Jeffrey Goldsworthy). He co-edits the Journal of Legal Philosophy.

== Scholarship ==
Crowe is best known internationally for his writings on legal philosophy, particularly his contributions to natural law theory. He advocates a dynamic understanding of natural law that emphasises its connections with social norms. In addition to his philosophical work, he has also published research on various fields of public law, including constitutional law and rape law.

=== Natural law theory ===
Crowe's book Natural Law and the Nature of Law argues against traditional ideas of natural law as timeless and unchanging. Rather, he proposes a ‘diachronic’ conception of natural law as evolving over time. Crowe describes natural law as ‘socially embodied, historically extended and dependent on facts about human nature.’ Natural law, on this view, is shaped by both inherent human qualities and the natural and social environments of human communities. It reflects ‘the ongoing human quest to work out how best to live flourishing, fulfilling lives given the nature we have and the social worlds we inhabit.’

=== Artifact theory of law ===
Crowe defends a theory of the nature of law that focuses on law's character as a human artifact. He argues that artifacts are defined primarily by reference to their functions. Law's function is ‘to serve as a deontic marker by creating a sense of social obligation’. Crowe contends that a law that is poorly suited to perform this function is defective, while a purported legal enactment that is incapable of performing this function fails to qualify as law. A law that is so unjust that it is incapable of creating a sense of social obligation will therefore be no law at all.

=== Judicial interpretation ===
Crowe's work on judicial interpretation is critical of originalism. He argues that judges should give legal documents their ordinary contemporary meaning, rather than the meaning they held when first enacted. This is necessary to preserve law's function as a means of social coordination. Crowe argues that judges should interpret laws in light of social practices and institutions, relying on ‘historically extended narratives’. He terms this theory ‘wide contextualism’. He further contends that, where the law is unjust, judges should bring it into dialogue with moral values to reach a practically reasonable outcome.

=== Political philosophy ===
Crowe challenges the traditional focus of natural law theory on state institutions. He highlights the important role of non-state forms of order, such as evolved social norms and practices, in securing the common good. Crowe argues that justice is best understood as the outcome of ethical relations between embodied persons, rather than as a set of institutions imposed on society from above. He describes this idea as ‘small justice’. He criticises competing theories of justice, such as that of John Rawls, for neglecting the role of interpersonal interactions in ensuring justice at a societal level.

=== Existentialism ===
Crowe's work on legal and ethical theory is influenced by existentialism, particularly the writings of Emmanuel Levinas. His doctoral thesis examined the intersections between existentialist ethics and natural law theory. Crowe draws attention to the important role of time in Levinas's writings. He argues that the temporal (or diachronic) dimension of Levinas's theory bridges the gap between his ethics and his political philosophy.

=== Mediation ethics ===
In collaborative work with Rachael Field, Crowe has argued for a new understanding of the ethics of mediation. Traditional views of mediation ethics focus on mediator neutrality or impartiality. However, Field and Crowe contend these notions are unhelpful and unrealistic when applied to mediation practice. Instead, they propose a new ethical paradigm centred on party self-determination. This approach is supported by ‘a focus on informed consent and an ethos of professionalism’. Field and Crowe defend a contextual ethical method as the most suitable way of resolving ethical dilemmas in mediation practice.

== Advocacy ==
Crowe is a founding director with Rachael Burgin and Saxon Mullins of Rape and Sexual Assault Research and Advocacy (RASARA), an Australia-wide organisation working to shape responses to sexual violence. The organisation describes itself as ‘survivor-focused’, ‘evidence-based’ and ‘reform-oriented’. He was also involved in a high-profile public advocacy campaign with author and activist Bri Lee to reform the mistake of fact excuse in Queensland rape law. Crowe and Lee's advocacy led the Queensland Attorney-General to refer this issue to the Queensland Law Reform Commission in July 2019, ultimately resulting in legal changes in 2023.

== Books ==
- Jonathan Crowe, Constance Youngwon Lee and Joshua Neoh (eds), Jurisprudence and Theology: The Australian School (Routledge, 2026)
- Jonathan Crowe, Legal Theory (Thomson Reuters, 4th ed., 2023)
- Jonathan Crowe, Australian Constitutional Law: Principles in Movement (Oxford University Press, 2022)
- Rachael Field and Jonathan Crowe, Mediation Ethics: From Theory to Practice (Edward Elgar, 2020)
- Jonathan Crowe, Natural Law and the Nature of Law (Cambridge University Press, 2019)
- Jonathan Crowe and Constance Youngwon Lee (eds), Research Handbook on Natural Law Theory (Edward Elgar, 2019)
- Jonathan Crowe, Legal Theory (Thomson Reuters, 3rd ed., 2019)
- Rebecca Ananian-Welsh and Jonathan Crowe (eds), Judicial Independence in Australia: Contemporary Challenges, Future Directions (Federation Press, 2016)
- Jonathan Crowe, Legal Theory (Thomson Reuters, 2nd ed., 2014)
- Jonathan Crowe and Kylie Weston-Scheuber, Principles of International Humanitarian Law (Edward Elgar, 2013)
- Suri Ratnapala and Jonathan Crowe, Australian Constitutional Law: Foundations and Theory (Oxford University Press, 3rd ed., 2012)
- Jonathan Crowe, Legal Theory (Thomson Reuters, 2009)
