= Trevor Rowe =

Australian businessman (born 1943)

Trevor Rowe, AO
- Born: 1943 (age 82–83)
- Occupations: Chairman, Rothschild Australia; Chairman, United Group; Chancellor, Bond University (2003–09)
- Board member of: Australian Securities Exchange, Future Fund

Trevor Cyril Rowe, AO, is an Australian businessman, and has held numerous executive positions in the public and private sectors. In his current position is as non-executive chairman of Rothschild Australia after stepping out of the executive chairman role in 2015.

Rowe's career included over 20 years of work in investment banking, establishing the Australian offices of Salomon Brothers. He held numerous positions with the Wall Street investment bank in Australia and the United States, before joining Citigroup when it bought Salomon Brothers and holding the position of chairman of investment banking with Citigroup Global Markets. He left in 2005 to become chairman of Rothschild Australia.

In 2003, Rowe was appointed Chairman of the United Group, a position he held until 2014 when he chose not stand to for re-election.

Rowe was an original member of the Board of Guardians of the Future Fund from 2006 until 2012 when his position was not renewed following a public fallout with the then Chairman David Murray.

Rowe served as Chancellor of Bond University on the Gold Coast, Queensland from 2003 to 2009. In May 2009, Rowe was awarded an Honorary Doctorate at Bond, to coincide with the end of his term; he continues to serve as a Trustee Board Member at Bond.

== Honours ==
Rowe was awarded the Centenary Medal in 2001 for distinguished service to the finance industry. On 14 June 2004, he was named a Member of the Order of Australia for service to the investment banking sector and as a contributor to the formulation of public policy, to higher education, and to the community. On 13 June 2011, he was named an Officer of the Order of Australia for distinguished service to the finance sector, particularly in the area of investment management, to higher education as Chancellor of Bond University, and to the community.

Academic offices
Preceded by Imelda Roche	Chancellor of Bond University; 2003 – 2009	Succeeded by Helen Nugent
