= Andrew Moir (footballer) =

Australian rules footballer

Personal information
- Full name: Andrew Moir
- Born: 3 January 1959 (age 67)
- Original team: Mentone Grammar
- Height: 183 cm (6 ft 0 in)
- Weight: 74 kg (163 lb)
- Position: Half-forward flank

Playing career^{1}
Years	Club	Games (Goals)
1977–1981	Melbourne	73 (68)
- ^{1} Playing statistics correct to the end of 1981.

Andrew Moir (born 3 January 1959) is a former Australian rules footballer who played for the Melbourne Football Club in the Victorian Football League (VFL).
