= Planet (company) =

Irish financial services company

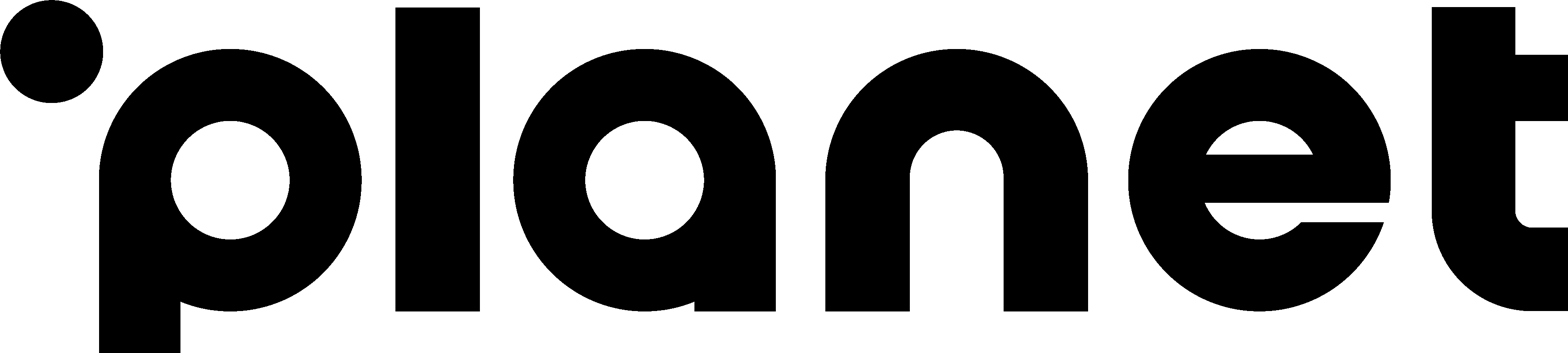
- Type: Privately held
- Founded: 1985
- Headquarters: Galway, Ireland
- Area served: Worldwide
- Key people: Brent Warrington (CEO)
- Products: Payments, Retail and Hospitality Software, VAT refund services (Tax Free Shopping); Dynamic Currency Conversion; Gift Card; Card Processing; Retail Sales & Cultural Training; Tourism Marketing Services; Business Intelligence
- Number of employees: +2500
- Website: www.weareplanet.com

Planet (formerly known as Fintrax and Premier Tax Free), is a financial services company, specializing in multicurrency payments, credit card processing, and tax-free VAT refunds management for tourists. Planet provides its services to international retail groups, hotels and banks. It is one of largest tax refund providers globally.

With global headquarters in London and offices in Paris, Galway, Dortmund, Zurich and Madrid, Planet operates in 64 markets across 5 continents and employs over 2500 people worldwide.

== History ==
Founded in Galway, Ireland in 1985 as Cashback Ltd., Premier Tax Free facilitated VAT refunds for international visitors to Ireland; a service that enables non-resident visitors to reclaim VAT on goods they purchase and privately export, according to EU legislation.

Between 1993 and 1999, the business expanded throughout Europe, launching in France and then opening operations in the United Kingdom, Italy, Switzerland, Spain, Austria, Belgium, the Netherlands, Germany and Poland.

In 2000, dynamic currency conversion was launched and further operations opened in Australia and Canada.

In 2009, the company was presented with a Retail Systems Award for ‘Cards and Payments Solution of the Year’ following a project with British department store House of Fraser.

In 2011, Premier Tax Free reportedly increased the Tax Free Shopping transactions by 150% in luxury fashion retailer, Hugo Boss, by introducing an automated point of sale solution.

In 2012, following further expansions into Uruguay, Greece and Argentina, previous owner and entrepreneur, Gerard Barry, sold Fintrax Group including Premier Tax Free to private equity firm Exponent for €170m.

In 2013, Premier Tax Free merged with Tax Free Worldwide. The joint entity provides services to over 150,000 merchants worldwide.

In 2015, French investment company Eurazeo acquired the majority stake in Fintrax from Exponent Private Equity, valuing the company at €550m.

In 2017, Fintrax Group acquired Planet Payment, a leading provider of international and multi-currency processing services, for $250 million. It also announced the acquisition of GB TaxFree, the third largest tax refund provider in the UK, for £15 million.

In 2018, The company is rebranded Planet.

In 2021 Advent International and Eurazeo invested in Planet to co-control the company and make it an integrated digital payment champion offering acquiring, processing, digital wallets, VAT refund and currency conversion services to merchants in the Retail, Hospitality, Food & Beverage, Parking and Financial sectors.

In 2022, Planet acquired Proximis, Datatrans AG, protel hotelsoftware, Hoist Group, and Avantio. That same year, Brent Warrington was appointed as CEO.

In 2023 Planet acquired 3 distributors of protel software: Ideosoft (with operations in France and Morocco), REBAG DATA (one of the largest distributors of hotel software within the Swiss market) and XN PMS Limited (operating in the UK and UAE). At the end of the year, Planet also announced the acquisition of Horizon Tax-Free from Fexco in Ireland.
