= Australian Academy of Forensic Sciences =

- Founded: 20 April 1967
- Founder: Dr. Oscar Rivers Schmalzbach OBE
- Type: learned society, forensic sciences; incorporated association (New South Wales)
- Region served: Australia
- Website: www.forensicacademy.org

Australian Journal of Forensic Sciences
- Discipline: forensic sciences
- Language: English
- Edited by: James Robertson

Publication details
- History: September 1968 –
- Publisher: Taylor & Francis (Australia)
- Frequency: Quarterly

Standard abbreviations
- ISO 4: Aust. J. Forensic Sci.

Indexing
- ISSN: 0045-0618 (print); 1834-562X (web)

Links
- Journal homepage

The Australian Academy of Forensic Sciences is a multi-disciplinary learned society founded in 1967 modelled on the British Academy of Forensic Sciences. The Academy conducts regular conferences, undertakes liaison with other Australian professional bodies including medico-legal societies established in Australia, and makes submissions on forensic sciences issues to governments and governmental bodies.

Since September 1968, the Academy has published the Australian Journal of Forensic Sciences.

The Academy awards the Oscar Rivers Schmalzbach Foundation Research Grants, named in honour of the inaugural Secretary-General of the Academy.

== History ==
After foundation, the first meeting as an Academy on 3 August 1967 adopted a constitution. The first president of the Academy was Russell Brereton, a judge of the Supreme Court of New South Wales. Later office-bearers included Sir Harry Gibbs (President, 1981), Sir Bernard Sugerman, Gordon Samuels (President, 1974–1976), Michael Kirby (President 1987–1989), Sir Douglas Miller and Sir Kenneth Noad (leading medical practitioners), Professor Malcolm Chaiken, David Bennett (President, 2000–2001), and Professor Peter Beumont.

== Oscar Schmalzbach ==
Oscar Rivers Schmalzbach was born in Poland in April 1912 and died in Sydney in January 1997. He began his tertiary education at the University of Poland but was forced into hiding when Germany invaded and escaped to Britain, serving in the British Army during the war. After, he became a Research Fellow in Physiology at Middlesex Hospital, completing post-graduate work at Maudsley Hospital and the National Institute of Neurology in 1947. In 1949, he migrated to Australia, arriving in Sydney where he was a medical officer at Callan Park Hospital. In 1963, he became Consultant Psychiatrist with the New South Wales Attorney General's Department and was called upon to give evidence and his opinion in major criminal trials. On 31 December 1979 he was made and Officer in the Order of the British Empire (Civil division).
