= Monex Europe =

British foreign exchange company

- Company type: Private company
- Industry: Financial services
- Founded: November 30, 2006
- Headquarters: Moorgate, London, UK
- Key people: Nick Edgeley (co-founder), Will Tracey (co-founder)
- Products: Foreign exchange
- Parent: Holding Monex
- Website: www.monexeurope.com

Monex Europe is a UK-based foreign exchange company that provides currency exchange and international payments. It is the European subsidiary of the Mexican financial company Holding Monex. The company provides same day, spot and forward foreign exchange contracts to FTSE-listed companies, financial institutions, SMEs, government and non-profit organisations.

== History ==
The company was established as Schneider Foreign Exchange in 2006 by Sonny Schneider, Nick Edgeley, Will Tracey, Shelton Fray and Antony North. It was registered by HM Revenue & Customs as a money services business.

In October 2010 it was named as a finalist for the National Business Awards Private Company of the Year award.

In March 2011, Schneider Foreign Exchange was granted authorisation by the Financial Conduct Authority as an Authorised Payment Institution.

In July 2012, Mexican based Monex Group (Holding Monex SAPIB), a major commercial foreign exchange providers, acquired Schneider Foreign Exchange and the company's name was changed to Monex Europe Ltd. Monex Europe is authorised by the FCA under the registration number 463951.

Nick Edgeley and Will Tracey remain on the Monex Europe leadership team. Sonny Schneider is the managing director of Schneider Trading Associates Limited, while Antony North is the co-founder of fintech company Centtrip and the CEO of Centtrip Music.

In January 2014, Monex Europe launched a subsidiary company Monex Europe Markets Ltd, selling financial derivatives. This subsidiary is authorised by the Financial Conduct Authority, with the registration number 596146.

== Operations ==
Monex Europe's headquarters are in London, with additional offices in Madrid and Amsterdam. As of 2015, based on published company accounts, Monex Europe had a currency turnover of £13.021bn for the nine-month period up to 31 December 2015.
