= Fexco =

Irish financial services and payments company

Fexco Financial Services
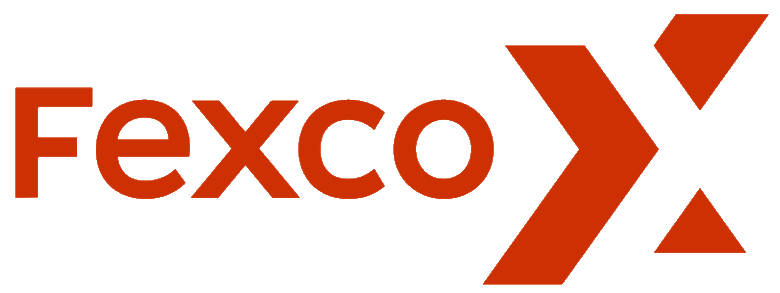
- Type: Private company
- Industry: Financial services
- Founded: 1981; 45 years ago
- Headquarters: Killorglin, Ireland
- Area served: Europe, Middle East, Asia, North America, Latin America, Australasia
- Key people: Brian McCarthy (Founder); Neil Hosty (CEO)
- Products: Foreign exchange
- Number of employees: ~3,600
- Website: www.fexco.com

Fexco is an Ireland-based financial services and financial technology company focusing on bureau de change and payment card services. Its head office is located in Killorglin, County Kerry. As of 2026, Fexco reportedly had approximately 3,600 staff and was operating in 60 countries. In 2018, approximately 1,200 of its staff were based in Ireland, with other offices in the UK, Spain, New Zealand, United States, Middle East and Asia.

== History ==
Fexco was set up in 1981 by Brian McCarthy, originally to provide bureau de change services to the Irish market. In 1989, Fexco and An Post established the Prize Bond Company, a joint venture that operates Ireland's Prize Bonds scheme on behalf of the Minister for Finance.

Former Tánaiste Dick Spring was appointed as an executive vice-chairman of Fexco in 2002.

As of 2009, services offered by Fexco included prize bonds, dynamic currency conversion and related customer services.

In 2010, Fexco acquired 75% of Goodbody Stockbrokers for a reported price of €24 million with the management take the remaining 25% stake in the business. A 2010 article in the Financial Times suggested that the modest price tag placed on Ireland's oldest stockbroker was reflective of a decline in the Irish economy at the time.

Fexco expanded its UK retail foreign-exchange operations by acquiring Edinburgh-based No1 Currency in 2012. In October 2013, Fexco completed the acquisition of Flashiz, a Luxembourg-based mobile payments and customer loyalty startup founded in 2011.

In February 2015, Denis McCarthy was appointed chief executive officer of Fexco. McCarthy had been active chief executive since Gavin O'Neill departed the company in 2014. The Currency Exchange Corporation was acquired by Fexco in 2016.

In 2018, Fexco turned down a deal to sell Goodbody to a Chinese consortium for €150 million. In November 2019, it was announced that Goodbody could to be sold to Bank of China for approximately €150 million, however by July 2020 it was reported that Bank of China was withdrawing from this acquisition citing uncertainty over the Coronavirus pandemic. In March 2021, AIB confirmed that it had agreed to acquire Goodbody Stockbrokers for €138 million.

In 2025, Fexco acquired Sainsbury's Travel money from Sainsbury's Bank, and in May 2026 it announced an investment in KSN Project Management, a construction consultancy company.
