= Monex Financial Services =

Monex Financial Services Limited
- Company type: Private company
- Industry: Financial services
- Founded: 1997
- Founder: Frank Murphy
- Headquarters: Killarney, Ireland
- Key people: Frank Murphy (CEO), Michael Crowley (COO)
- Products: Foreign exchange, Dynamic Currency Conversion
- Website: www.monexfs.com

Monex Financial Services, is a private financial services company with headquarters in County Kerry, Ireland. The company is focused on FinTech solutions and Dynamic Currency Conversion (DCC) however Monex FinTech solutions span a wide range of Foreign Exchange (FX) treasury solutions.

Working with international banks and processors, Monex services include: DCC for the automated teller machines (ATM) industry and Point-of-Sale merchants, multi-currency pricing, FX Rates, Treasury Management and FinTech payment and credit card services.

In 2018, the company processed over $48 billion transactions and DCC was live in 50 countries on 4 Continents. The company operates DCC on ATM networks of over 70,000 ATMs. Monex global office locations include Abu Dhabi, Bangkok, California, Hong Kong, London and Shanghai.

== History ==
Monex commenced business in 1997 following the invention of DCC by founder and CEO [Frank Murphy]. The service began its first implementation with Hertz Rent-a-Car.
