= Tim Brailsford =

Professor Tim Brailsford is the current vice chancellor and president of Bond University, an appointment he commenced in January, 2012. An expert in finance and investments, his previous positions include the Frank Finn Professor of Finance and Executive Dean of the Faculty of Business, Economics & Law at the University of Queensland; Dean of the Faculty of Economics and Commerce at the Australian National University in Canberra, and other senior academic positions at the University of Melbourne and Monash University. He holds PhD, Master and Honours degrees and is a Fellow of the Financial Services Institute of Australasia, Fellow of the Australian Institute of Management and Fellow of CPA Australia.

He has published a number of books and monographs, published over 60 research papers and is the co-author of the best-selling Australasian text, Investments: Concepts & Applications, now in its 4th edition.

In 2003, Professor Brailsford was awarded the Prime Minister's Centenary Medal for his contributions to the industry.

His board appointments include Queensland Rugby Union (including Reds Rugby), AACSB, EFMD, and a number of private investment companies. He is a regular consultant and advisor to industry and government, particularly in the field of investment management and valuation.

He has served on a number of professional committees, including the Professional Education Board of CPA Australia, and was formerly President of the Accounting and Finance Association of Australia & New Zealand, the Association of Asia-Pacific Business Schools and the Australian Business Deans' Council. He is currently appointed to the global Board of Directors of AACSB International and the Global Board of Trustees of the European Foundation for Management Development and is the first Australian to be elected to these positions.
