= David Baxby =

Australian businessman

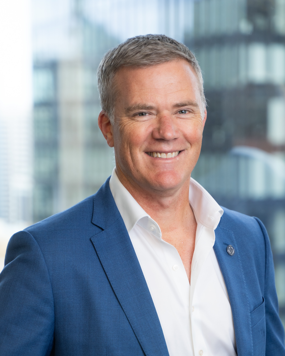

Chancellor of Bond University
- Incumbent
- Assumed office 24 May 2024
- Preceded by: Hon Dr Annabelle Bennett

Personal details
- Education: Bond University (BCom, LL.B. (Hons))
- Occupation: Business executive, investor
- Known for: Co‑CEO of Virgin Group (2011–2014); co‑founder of Coogee Capital

David Baxby is an Australian business executive and investor.

After an early career in investment banking, he joined the Virgin Group in 2004 and served as co‑chief executive from 2011 to 2014, focusing on the group's aviation and branded investment activities.

He later headed the Swiss tax‑free shopping company Global Blue from 2014 to 2015, led the industrials division of Wesfarmers from 2017 to 2020 and co‑founded private‑equity firm Coogee Capital in 2021.

Baxby became chancellor of Bond University in 2024, the first alumnus to hold the role.

== Education ==
Baxby studied at Bond University on a scholarship, completing a Bachelor of Commerce and a Bachelor of Laws (Honours) in 1994.

== Career ==
Investment Banking - In 1996 he joined Rothschild Australia, working on mining and telecommunications transactions. He later moved to Goldman Sachs, co‑heading its consumer and industrial investment banking team and advising corporate clients, including the Virgin Group.

Virgin Group – Baxby joined the Virgin Group in 2004. As global head of aviation and later co‑chief executive (2011–2014), he was responsible for the group's airline businesses and other branded investments.

Global Blue – In April 2014 he was appointed chief executive of Global Blue, a Swiss‑based tax‑free shopping and payment services company, and served until 2015.

Wesfarmers – Baxby joined Wesfarmers in August 2017 as managing director of its industrials division. He oversaw the group's chemicals, energy and fertilizer businesses and industrial supply companies and stepped down in March 2020.

Coogee Capital – In 2021 he co‑founded Coogee Capital, a private‑equity firm, with entrepreneur Tom Hardwick. The firm invests in founder‑led companies with current investments in the healthcare and infrastructure space.

== Chancellorship and other roles ==
Baxby was elected the ninth chancellor of Bond University in May 2024, becoming the university's first alumnus to hold the post.

He had previously received the inaugural Robert Stable Alumni Medal in 2013.

Outside his professional roles, he supports charitable causes such as the Starlight Children's Foundation's Tour de Kids cycling fundraiser. He also served as chair of Virgin Unite in the Asia–Pacific region, the Virgin Group's charitable arm focused on youth‑centred initiatives.
