= Bond University =

Private university in Queensland, Australia

Coordinates: 28°04′26.34″S 153°24′59.36″E

- Coat of arms
- Former name: Bond University of Applied Technology (1986)
- Motto: Forever learning
- Type: Private non-profit research university
- Established: 23 April 1987; 39 years ago
- Founders: Alan Bond; Harunori Takahashi; Taro Tanioka
- Accreditation: TEQSA
- Budget: A$207.99 million (2023)
- Chancellor: David Baxby
- Vice-Chancellor: Tim Brailsford
- Academic staff: 391 (2023)
- Administrative staff: 496 (2023)
- Total staff: 914 (2024)
- Students: 5,707 (2023)
- Undergraduates: c. 2,568 (2023)
- Postgraduates: c. 2,168 (2023)
- Other students: c. 285 research (2023) c. 684 other (2023)
- Location: 14 University Drive, Gold Coast, Queensland, 4226, Australia
- Campus: 50 hectares (0.5 km^{2}); Suburban
- Colours: Blue Gold
- Nickname: Bull Sharks
- Sporting affiliations: Premier Rugby (Bond Rugby Club); QFA – Division II (Bond AFL Club); QAFLW (Bond AFL Club)
- Mascot: Bondy the Bull Shark
- Website: bond.edu.au

Bond University is Australia's first private not-for-profit university and is located in Robina on the Gold Coast, Queensland. Since its opening on 15 May 1989, Bond University has primarily been a teaching-focused higher education institution featuring a trimester timetable.

Bond comprises four main university schools and academic faculties, through which it offers a range of accelerated undergraduate and postgraduate degrees and programs, diplomas, and non-award programs.

== History ==
Bond University was established and funded in 1987 by the chairman of Bond Corporation, Alan Bond, the president of the Japanese-based Electronics and Industrial Enterprises International (EIE), Harunori Takahashi and Dr Taro Tanioka, in a joint venture to manage the land and construction of the buildings of the university.

The university's buildings and surrounding land initially covered approximately 212 hectares and encompassed what was previously a pine plantation known as the Burleigh Forest. In the 1970s, Bond had obtained control of a number of pine plantations in the region, previously owned by the Savoy Corporation Limited and Gold Coast Cooperative Plantations Society Limited, and established a new company known as the Development Equity Corporation (DEC) to develop them.

DEC was managed by Brian Orr who, in 1976, put forward a proposal to the Albert Shire Council for a university at Gaven Forest. While this project did not proceed, a subsequent proposal made in 1986 to build a university at Burleigh Forest did gain traction. Orr discussed the matter with Bond and Peter Beckwith and recruited Jo Anne Cracknell to research the feasibility of venture.

On 3 July 1986, Bond decided to proceed with the project and his intention to build the university, then known as the Bond University of Applied Technology, was formally announced at the National Party of Australia conference on the Gold Coast by the Premier of Queensland, Joh Bjelke-Petersen on 17 July 1986.

On 9 April 1987, the Parliament of Queensland granted Bond University university status via the passage of the Bond University Act. In 1989 the university commenced teaching with an initial intake of 322 students.

In 1991, EIE acquired Bond Corporation's share of the company that controlled the land on which the university buildings were constructed and the surrounding development lands following the collapse of Bond Corporation. By 1993, EIE was in receivership and the Bond University Council commenced negotiations to acquire the campus from the mortgagee, the Long-Term Credit Bank of Japan. The university retained the name 'Bond' even though, within a decade of its founding, Alan Bond was sentenced to separate jail terms for investment and corporate fraud (1995 and 1996).

The Bond University Council was not the only entity interested in the site which was advertised for sale in major newspapers. In 1995, the Employment, Education and Training References Committee of the Australian Senate undertook a report into the proposed sale of the campus to the University of Queensland which had outbid the Bond University Council in their earlier negotiations to acquire the site.

In August 1999, the Bond University Council was successful in securing the 50-acre campus site which was acquired by a newly formed public company known as Bond University Limited.

In 2019, the university celebrated its 30-year mark since it opened. The same year, the university severed ties with the United Kingdom's Prince Andrew and his former organization Pitch@Palace Global.

== Campus and buildings ==
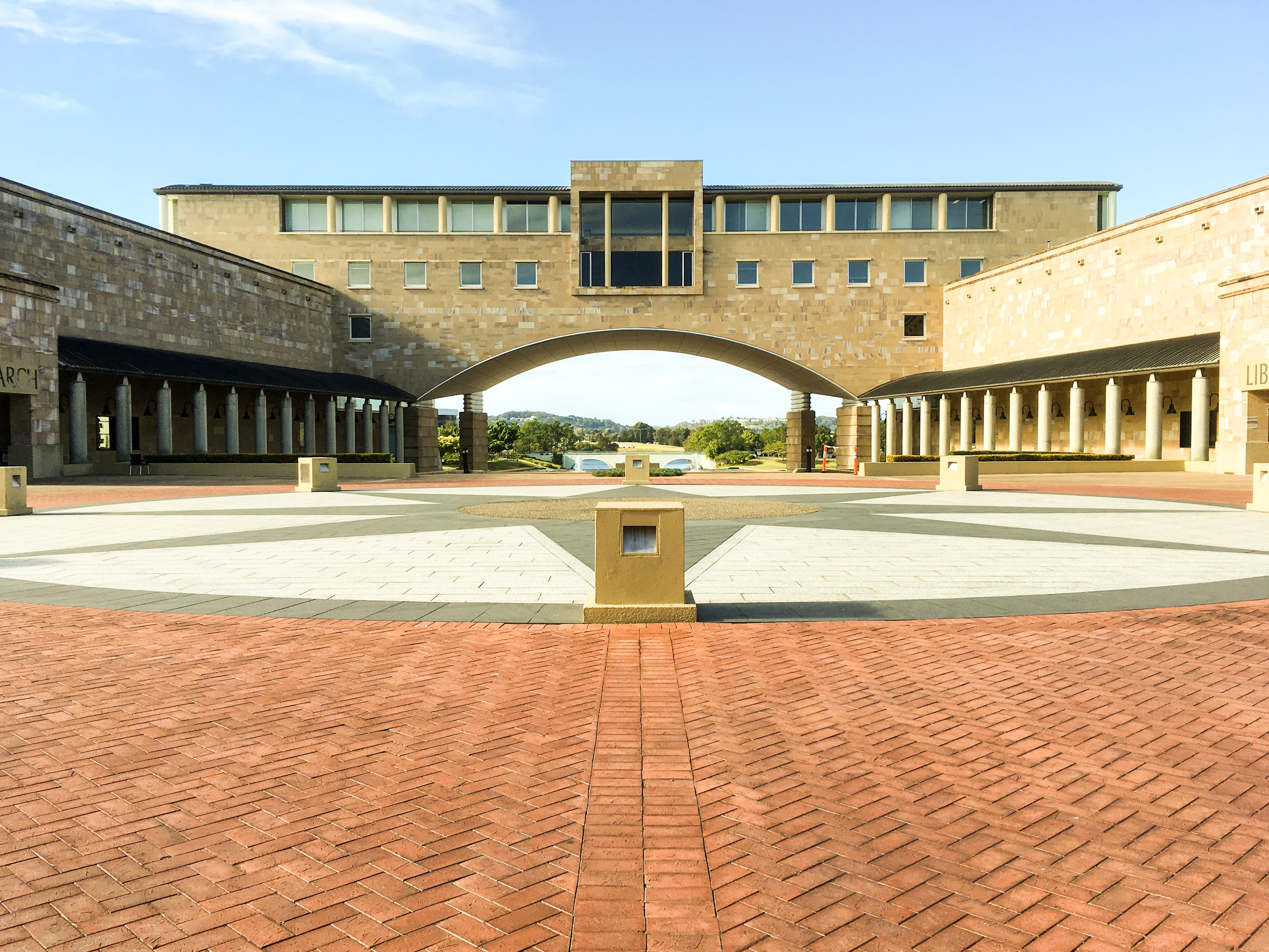
The Arch Building, Faculty of Society and Design and the John and Alison Kearney Main Library

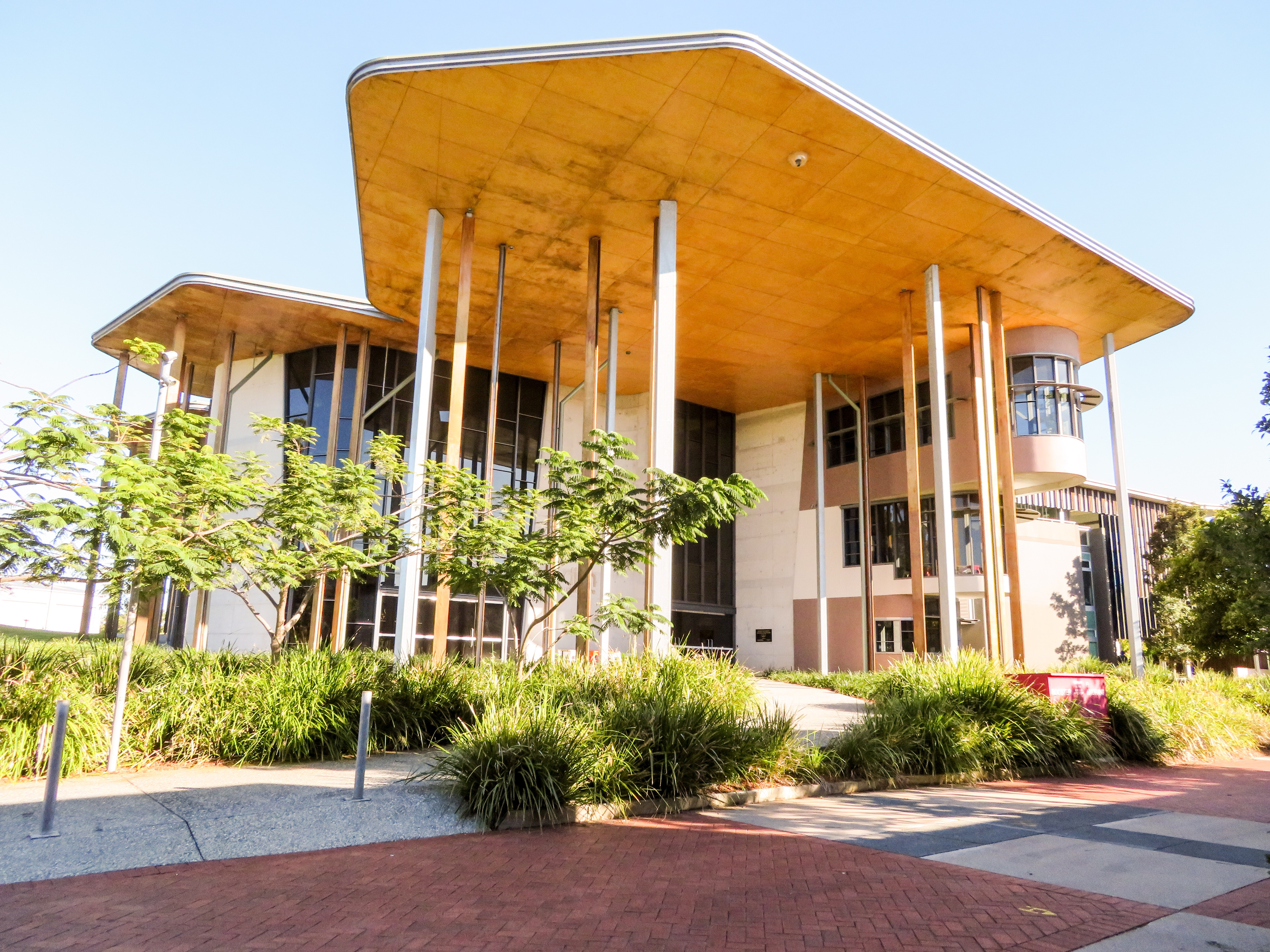
The Abedian School of Architecture

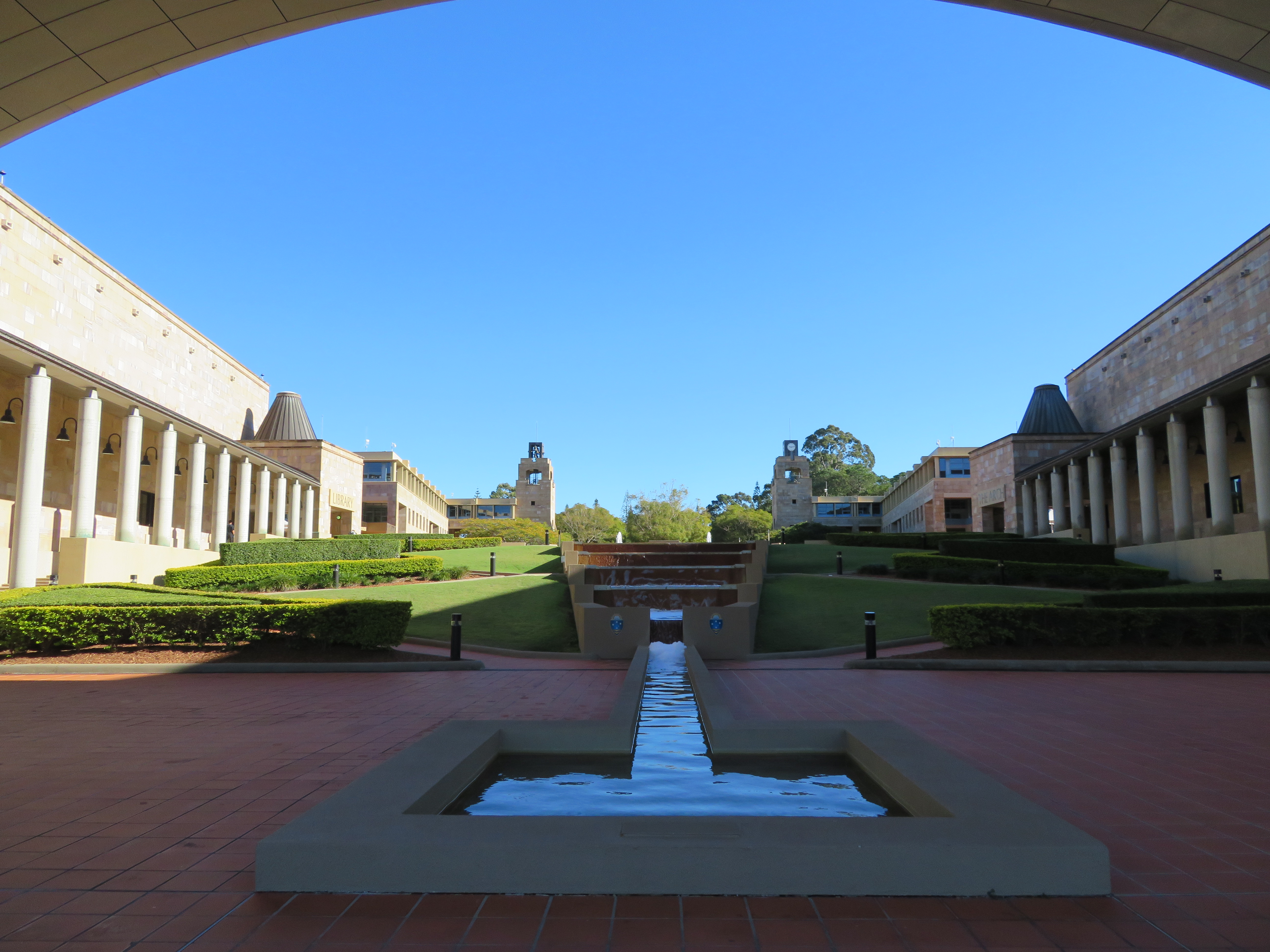
Water cascade, bell tower and clock tower

The Bond University campus features a series of sandstone buildings centred around human-made Lake Orr. The campus was conceived and developed by master planner Daryl Jackson of Jackson Architecture with significant input from Queensland architect Robin Gibson. The signature arch building was designed by Japanese architect Arata Isozaki, inspired by the Arch of Constantine in Rome, Italy.

Students at Bond University have access to a number of academic, technological and recreational facilities.

Recent alterations to the campus facilities include:

- The re-designed Faculty of Law building, including the John and Alison Kearney Law Library, opened in January 2018, including a showcase moot court, the third at the independent Gold Coast university, and additional space for Bond's community law clinics, along with 10 new teaching spaces, a new reception and foyer, an open-plan lounge, a student hub and offices for the three main law student associations.
- The Balnaves Foundation Multimedia Learning Centre, named in honour of university benefactor, Dr Neil Balnaves, AO – a $3.4million technology-rich student facility opened in March 2010 In January 2017, a new Digital Media Hub was added to the facility, including a micro-studio featuring a green screen, study lounge areas, and individual digital media workstations.
- Limitless, a sculpture by Gold Coast artist Ian Haggerty, was revealed at Bond University to celebrate its 30th anniversary. The artwork features the names of 26,727 students and one hidden message. Limitless sits under The Arch Building. It weighs 1.5 tonnes and the globe at the base is 1.5 metres in diameter.

Other campus facilities at Bond University include:

- The Bond Institute of Health & Sport, a teaching and training facility located four kilometres from the main campus, is composed of clinical skills rooms, simulation spaces, and specialised teaching rooms for allied health programs and research including occupational therapy, physiotherapy and nutrition and dietetics.
- The Legal Skills Centre, situated within the Faculty of Law, officially opened by Governor-General, Quentin Bryce AC, in March 2011. The Legal Skills Centre includes a full-scale electronic moot court.
- The ADCO Amphitheatre – an outdoor amphitheatre and Alumni Court sponsored by ADCO Constructions - opened in September 2009.
- The Macquarie Trading Room, opened by Queensland Deputy Premier Anna Bligh in May 2007, providing students with a simulated trading environment in two industry-standard trading facilities, including live ticker screens and market data from 40 Bloomberg terminals, the most of any university in Australia.
- The Sports Centre is a new sporting facility measuring 2,700 sqm that opened in May 2016. The facilities available to students include a fully equipped gymnasium, 50 metre heated Olympic size swimming pool, group exercise classes, tennis courts, squash courts and beach volleyball courts.
- In 2008, the Bond University Sustainable Development Building was officially opened by the then Prime Minister Julia Gillard and was the first in Australia to achieve a 6 Star Green Star – Education PILOT Certified Rating for design by the Green Building Council of Australia.
- In 2006, the Prime Minister John Howard opened the then $20 million Faculty of Health Sciences & Medicine building (although the first intake of students was in May 2005), housing lecture theatres, tutorial rooms, specialised clinical rooms and a suite of laboratories. In 2010, a new purpose-built anatomy laboratory was also added.
- The $16.2 million Soheil Abedian School of Architecture building was designed by Sir Peter Cook and Gavin Robotham from CRAB Studios in London and opened in October 2013. The building includes an innovative workshop and digital fabrication lab facilities.

In 2001, the university established an online MBA course, the Bond-BBT Global Leadership MBA, collaborated with Kenichi Ohmae and Business Breakthrough Inc. in Japan.

== Governance and structure ==
=== Chancellor and Vice-Chancellor ===
The current and eighth chancellor of the university since 2016 is Annabelle Bennett, AC SC, a retired judge of the Federal Court of Australia and an academic. The current vice-chancellor and president of the university since January 2012 is Tim Brailsford.

=== Faculties and departments ===
The university has four faculties to support both research and teaching activities.

- Bond Business School
- Faculty of Law
- Faculty of Health Sciences and Medicine
- Faculty of Society and Design

== Academic profile ==
=== Academic reputation ===
University rankings

Global – Overall
- QS World: =591 (2026)
- THE World: 401–500 (2026)
- USNWR Global: =1296 (25/26)

National – Overall
- ERA National: 38 (2018)
- QS National: 30 (2026)
- THE National: 26–32 (2026)
- USNWR National: 37 (25/26)
- AFR National: =19 (2025)

National publications

In the Australian Financial Review Best Universities Ranking 2025, the university was tied #19 amongst Australian universities.

Global publications

In the 2026 Quacquarelli Symonds World University Rankings (published 2025), the university attained a tied position of #591 (30th nationally).

In the Times Higher Education World University Rankings 2026 (published 2025), the university attained a position of #401–500 (tied 26–32nd nationally).

In the 2025–2026 U.S. News & World Report Best Global Universities, the university attained a tied position of #1296 (37th nationally).

=== Student outcomes ===
The Australian Government's QILT (Note: Abbreviation for Quality Indicators for Learning and Teaching.) conducts national surveys documenting the student life cycle from enrolment through to employment. These surveys place more emphasis on criteria such as student experience, graduate outcomes and employer satisfaction than perceived reputation, research output and citation counts.

In the 2023 Employer Satisfaction Survey, graduates of the university had an overall employer satisfaction rate of 78.9%.

In the 2023 Graduate Outcomes Survey, graduates of the university had a full-time employment rate of 79.2% for undergraduates and 89.1% for postgraduates. The initial full-time salary was A$60,300 for undergraduates and A$80,900 for postgraduates.

In the 2023 Student Experience Survey, undergraduates at the university rated the quality of their entire educational experience at 88.3% meanwhile postgraduates rated their overall education experience at 82.7%.

== Student life ==
=== Student association ===
The Bond University Student Association (BUSA) is a student organisation that aims to make student life at Bond more rewarding, ranging from enhancing academic pursuits, facilitating sporting involvement and satisfying social necessities.

=== Sports and athletics ===
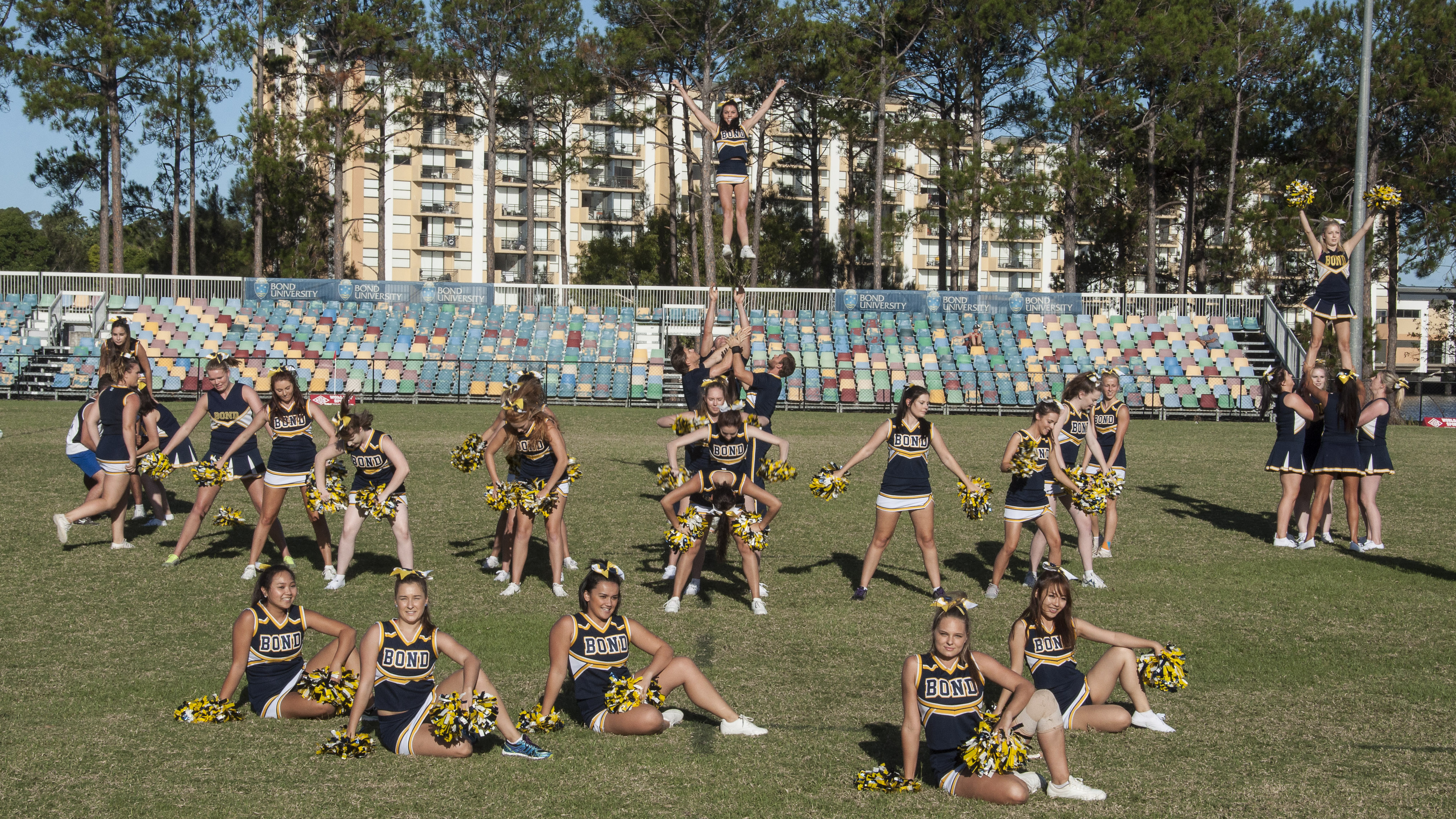
Bond University cheerleaders

Sports teams in national and state-level competitions based at Bond include Bond University Rugby Club that plays in the Queensland Premier Rugby competition, and the Bond University Bullsharks club that plays in the Queensland Football Association Division 1 (QFA Division 1) competition. Bond University fields soccer teams within Football Queensland South Coast and Football Queensland competitions.

The Bond University Student Association (BUSA) assists with the university's participation in intervarsity sport on a regional and national level. Bond University was named the overall champions at the Northern University Games (NUG) in July 2011, and went on to be named Australian University Sport Per Capita Champions at the Australian University Games in 2011, 2013, 2014, 2015 and most recently 2017.

=== Student accommodation ===
Bond University Student Housing caters for both domestic and international students, with a range of housing on campus. Bond University is centrally located on the Gold Coast, in the suburb of Robina.

== Controversies ==
=== Australian Human Rights Commission Data and Report ===
In 2017, Bond University, in conjunction with all Australian universities, participated in a national report undertaken by the Australian Human Rights Commission to tackle the issue of sexual harassment and assault. The Vice Chancellor of Bond University acknowledged the survey results saying, "Today is a wake-up call, and we understand that the issue of sexual harassment and assault is real and attitudes need to change, both in society and within the university sector. One case is one case too many. We are supportive of the recommendations of the Australian Human Rights Commission, and have already implemented the majority of the measures they have proposed."

== See also ==
- List of universities in Australia
