= Goldline International =

Retail seller of coins and precious metals

Goldline Inc.
- Type: Private company
- Genre: Gold and precious metals trading company
- Founded: 1960
- Headquarters: Los Angeles, California, U.S.
- Area served: United States and Canada
- Website: Goldline.com

Goldline, LLC was a retail seller of gold and silver coins, and other precious metals for investors and collectors. Goldline traced its formation to a Deak & Co. subsidiary created in 1960, a firm that in the late 1970s was the largest storefront gold retailer and later went into bankruptcy in the 1980s. The company was later bought and sold several times in the ensuing years. The company sold its assets to A-Mark Precious Metals, Inc. in August 2017.

== History ==
Nicholas Deak, a Hungarian immigrant, founded Deak & Co. in 1939 and served in the OSS (precursor to the CIA) during World War II. Deak & Co. specialized in foreign exchange, gold coins and bullion, and was considered a pioneer in the business.

By the early 1980s, the company was the largest retailer of gold bullion and the oldest and largest retail foreign exchange dealer in the United States. While Deak described himself as a gold bug, the company felt the strain of growing too rapidly during the gold economic bubble which burst by 1982. At that point, they planned on expanding into the wholesale market, offering services to companies instead of the public. The company was the country's leading seller of South Africa's Krugerrand before it was pressured to halt sales because of South Africa's apartheid system in 1985.

In 1984, Deak & Co. faced allegations from the President's Commission on Organized Crime that they laundered money for Latin American drug traffickers, facilitated the Lockheed bribery scandals, and smuggled currency from the Philippines. As a result, shortly thereafter, Deak & Co. declared bankruptcy in order to reorganize. In 1985, the company was purchased by a Singapore lawyer for $52 million — the most valued asset was Deak's Swiss bank. In 1986, the foreign exchange and gold business was sold to Australia's Martin Properties Ltd. (later renamed Deak Morgan) for $12 million. In the following year, the company was transferred to New Zealand based NZI and expanded its gold coin dealerships by one-third. At the same time, Deak Investor Services, Inc. changed its name to Deak International Goldline Ltd.

Due to the 1987 worldwide market crash, the company foundered, and was sold to the London-based Thomas Cook Group in August 1990 for $10–$12 million. Several months afterward, Deak International Goldline (US) Ltd. was bought by A-Mark Precious Metals Inc, a wholesaler dealer in precious metals, thereby adding a retail presence. In 1992, Deak International Goldline (US) Ltd. changed its name to Goldline International, Inc. and Mark Albarian became president. In 1994, Goldline acquired the assets of Gold & Silver Emporium, and in 1998, acquired Dreyfus Precious Metals, Inc., the precious metal brokerage and storage subsidiary of the Dreyfus Corporation.

In 2005, the A-Mark Corporation sold Goldline to three investor groups, each of which acquire minority stakes: Prudential Capital, Goldline management, and Goldline's former chairman. Two years later, Goldline moved its headquarters and trading floor across Santa Monica, California to offices at the Water Garden complex. In 2009, CIVC, a Chicago-based private equity company, acquires controlling interest in Goldline by purchasing the stakes owned by Prudential Capital and Goldline's former chairman. Goldline management also increases its stake. This transaction was worth over $50 million.

In August 2017, Goldline sold its assets to A-Mark Precious Metals, Inc. The newly formed company is called Goldline, Inc., a wholly owned subsidiary of A-Mark Precious Metals, Inc.

== Business operations ==
=== Overview ===
Goldline was a retail seller of gold coins, silver coins, platinum, bullion bars and bullion coins, special collections, currencies, and other precious metals for investors and collectors. According to the Los Angeles Business Journal, in 2009, Goldline had more than 300 employees and sales revenue of $825 million which the newspaper said made it the "6th fastest growing company" in Los Angeles County, California for 2010 Goldline later sold its assets in 2017 and ceased business as a precious metals dealer.

=== Marketing ===
Goldline advertised through a variety of marketing channels including the Internet, radio, and television. Former Director of the United States Mint and Democratic Congressman Jay W. Johnson was Goldline's television spokesperson from June 2009 until his death in October of that same year. John Mercanti, the retired 12th Chief Engraver of the U.S. Mint, was also a Goldline spokesperson. Goldline's television advertising included cable networks such as CNN, CNBC, Fox News, History International and Fox Business.

Goldline had also been the sponsor of the shows of a number of conservative radio and television hosts, including The American Advisor, and The Glenn Beck Program, The Laura Ingraham Show, The Fred Thompson Show, The Huckabee Report, The Lars Larson Show, The Monica Crowley Show, The Mark Levin Show, and The Alan Colmes Show. In 2009, Goldline incorrectly labeled Glenn Beck as a "paid spokesman" on its website which raised concerns with his employer, Fox News, which prohibits such a relationship; they later corrected it to "radio sponsor". Prior to his Fox News employment, Beck had appeared in a Goldline website video. The late night satirical television program The Daily Show with Jon Stewart has skewered the relationship, and in 2010 some alleged that there is a conflict of interest which both Beck and Goldline deny.

In 2010, then Congressman New York Representative Anthony Weiner criticized the advertising relationship between Goldline and certain conservative commentators calling it an “unholy alliance”. Goldline maintained there was nothing improper about these sponsorships.

== Business policies ==
=== Sales ===
The company sold over the phone, via Internet, and in person to customers responding to an advertisement. It also called past customers when new collectibles arrived but did not cold call prospective clients. Purchases were made by check, credit card, cash, or wire transfer.

=== Prices ===
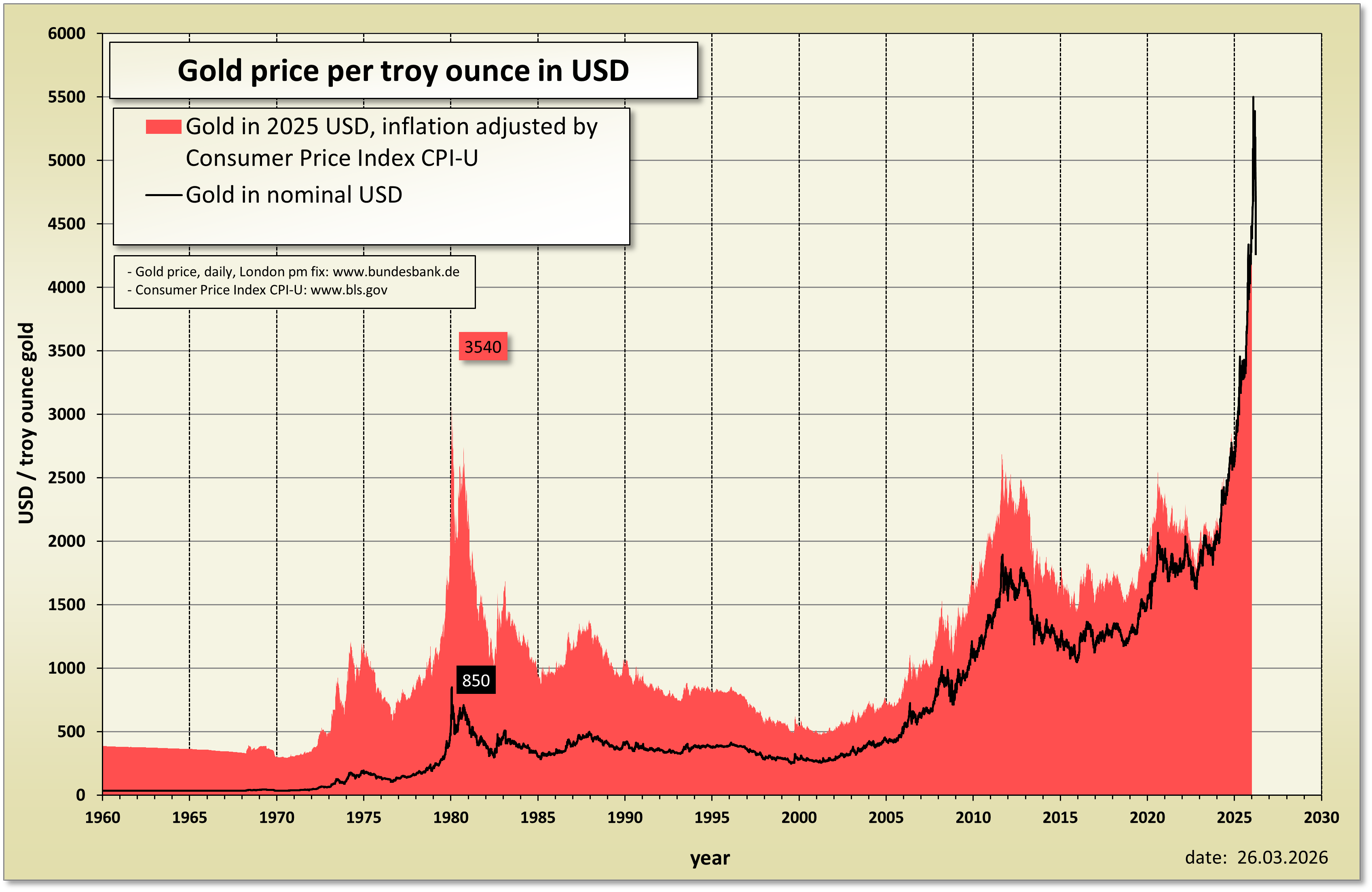
Price of 1 troy ounce (31 g) of gold since 1960 in nominal US-Dollars and inflation adjusted by Consumer Price Index CPI-U.

Prices ranged from as low as 5% for bullion coins and as high as 54% for unusual and historical coins. While giving Goldline an A+ rating according to the New York Times, the BBB declared that it was standing by the company as it was "a company with not that many complaints" and that "there was a remarkable difference in how each one addressed complaints" when it came to BBB complaints, still wrote "Guaranteed profits are an illusion" in conjunction with certain advertising campaigns.

New York Representative Anthony Weiner accused Goldline of overcharging with average markups of 90% to 152%. Dylan Ratigan, a television financial commentator, stated that he agreed that Goldline was involved in manipulating the public. Goldline also offers a "price guarantee program": if the price of selected coins (not bullion) declines within two weeks, the buyer may request the difference be used to purchase coins of the same type (not a refund) so long as it is done within the allowable period of 14 days.

=== Government and private gold ===
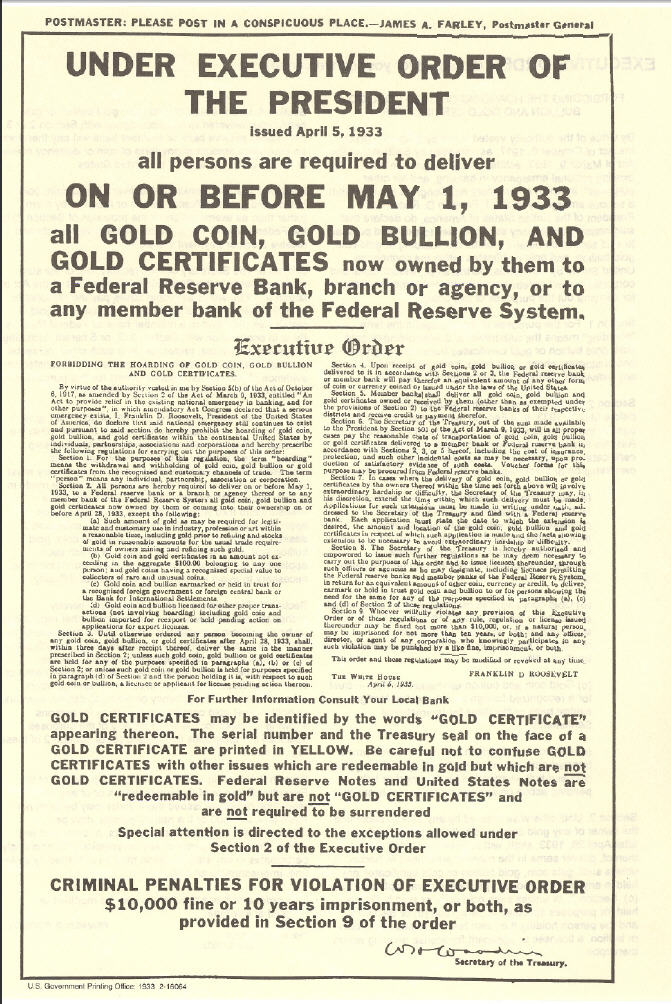
Executive Order 6102

In its sales literature, Goldline had drawn a distinction between what it called "government gold" and "private gold." During the Great Depression, in order to stabilize the dollar then backed by gold and to avoid a run on the banks, U.S. President Franklin D. Roosevelt issued a 1933 executive order requiring citizens to surrender their gold for which they were reimbursed at a price set by the government itself. Goldline stated that "private gold" (defined as coins that were explicitly exempted from the 1933 order because of their collector value) would be less likely to be recalled in the future if the government followed the precedent set by Roosevelt, thereby possibly increasing the desirability of collector-grade coins.

The Roosevelt order resulted in only one failed prosecution, and the dollar is no longer backed by gold thereby putting into question why the government would again ask for its surrender. Rep. Weiner expressed doubt of the likelihood of a future recall and the American Numismatic Association said it was "a non issue". The Santa Monica and L.A. County investigators alleged that the distinction is used to spur the sale of the more-profitable collectible coins.

Goldline included a replica of the 1933 order in their sales material. When asked about this by George Stephanopoulos on ABC's Good Morning America, Scott Carter, the Executive Vice President of Goldline, said he didn't know if the government would again "confiscate" bullion but some saw a parallel between 2010 and 1933.

=== Collectible coins versus bullion ===
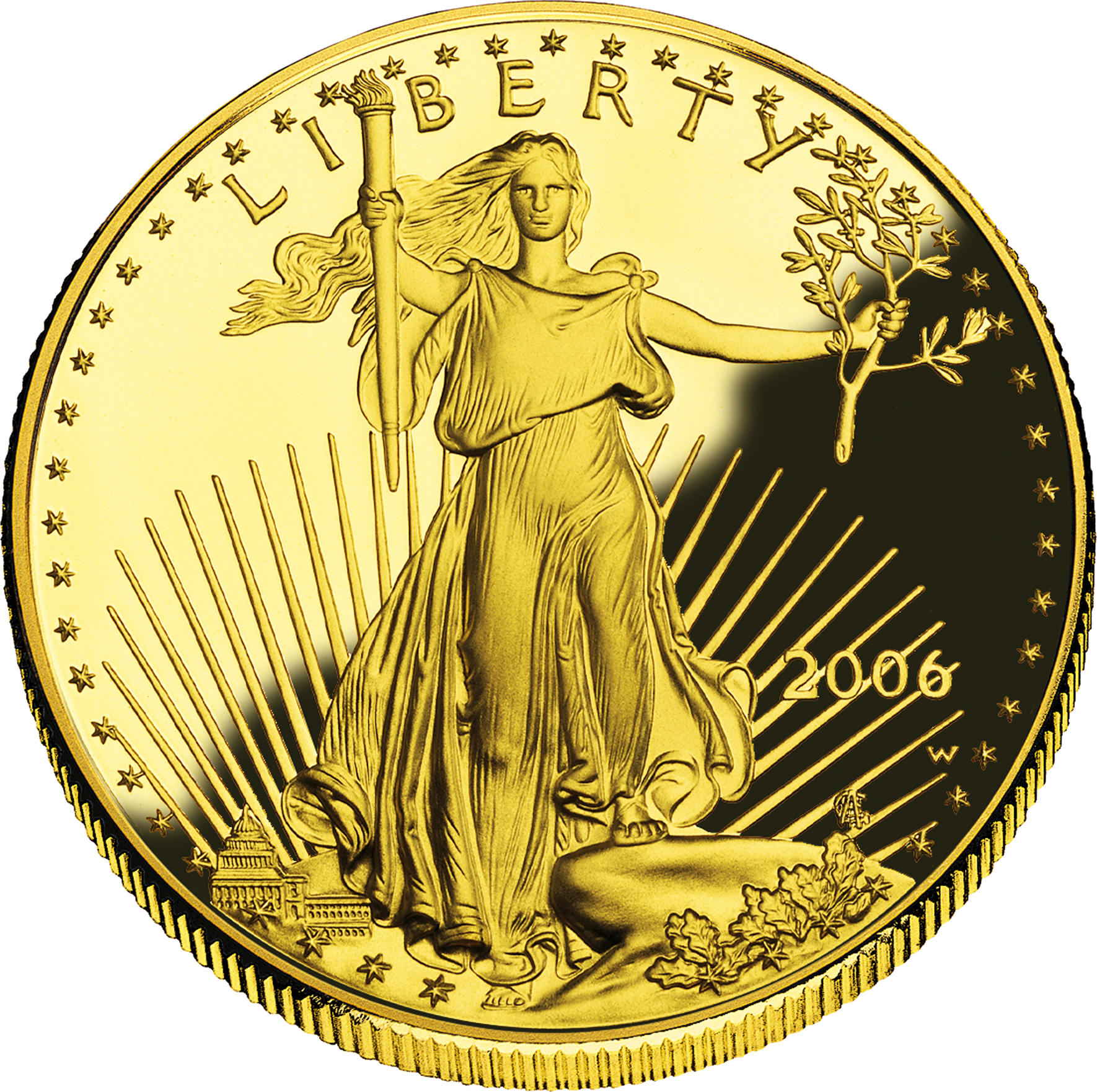
American Gold Eagle

Because of collectible coins' higher markups and mention of past government confiscation of bullion in Goldline sales literature, Weiner accused the company of recommending rare collectible coins over less-profitable bullion. Some customers prefer collectibles because they are recognizable, government-issued coins, and may be less expensive.

== Investigations and lawsuits ==
=== 2006 ===
In a July 2010 article, Consumer Reports reported that a Goldline sales rep advised one of its reporters liquidate their IRA and retirement account in order to have 20% of their portfolio in gold. This related to an October 2006 consent order, in which Goldline voluntarily agreed to return $217,000.00 to a Missouri elderly couple in exchange for the products purchased for the company after the Missouri Securities Division alleged that the couple was pressured by a Goldline salesperson to liquidate all their investments and put them into gold. The Missouri Secretary of State Securities Division investigated and alleged that the company's agent was acting as an unregistered investment advisor, but the consent order did not judge whether the accusation was true or false. Goldline sales staff were not legally allowed to provide investment advice.

=== 2010 ===
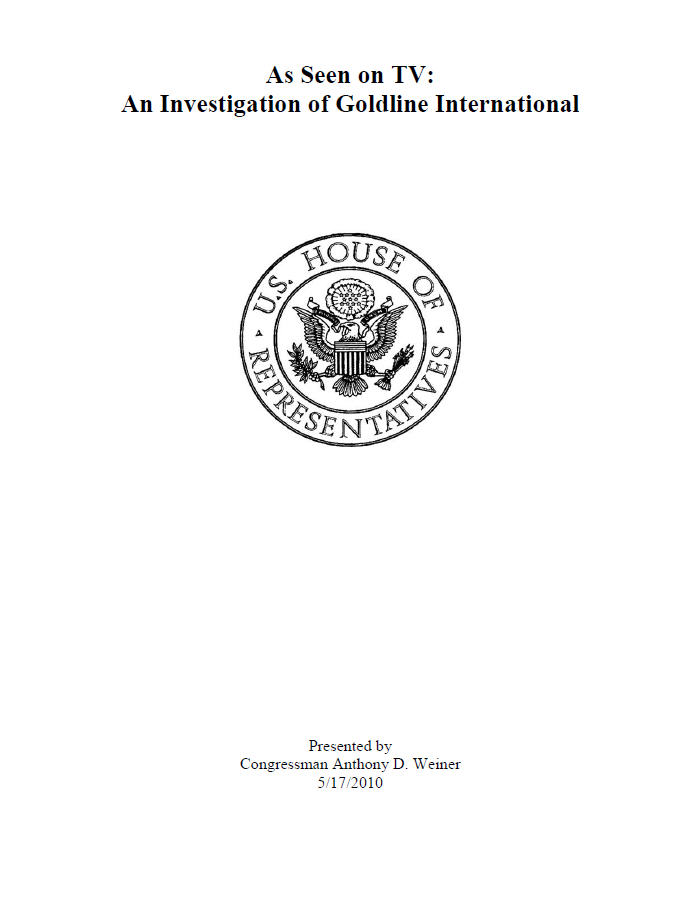
The cover of Representative Anthony Weiner's report "As Seen on TV: An Investigation of Goldline International"

In September 2010, the Subcommittee on Energy, Commerce and Consumer Protection held a hearing on proposed legislation by then Congressman Anthony Weiner regarding mandatory disclosures for the sale of coins and precious metals. Goldline Executive Vice President Scott Carter was invited to testify at the hearing. The Chairman of the Committee on Energy, Commerce and Consumer Protection attended as an ex officio member and stated at the outset of the hearing, “I also don't think it's appropriate to hold a hearing because this is a substance that's being advertised on Glenn Beck or Rachel Maddow or anybody else.” Carter testified regarding Goldline's sales practices and client policies as well as concerns about the proposed legislation. The former director of the FTC's Bureau of Consumer Protection testified, “the best protection remains the common law principles that the Commission enforces. Goldline’s practices are entirely consistent with these principles." No action was taken on the proposed legislation following the subcommittee hearing. Weiner's legislation never received a co-sponsor in the House of Representatives and no Senator agreed to introduce similar legislation in the Senate. Weiner never attempted to move the legislation out of subcommittee.

Goldline had indicated that Rep. Weiner's office never contacted them directly to discuss the matter when creating its report and ignored an offer to tour their facility. Glenn Beck, a frequent spokesman for Goldline, claimed Weiner was using McCarthy-like attacks and accused him of assailing Goldine at the request of the Barack Obama administration, and Mark Levin called him “a grandstanding leftist."

At the same time, however the offices of the Los Angeles County District Attorney and the Santa Monica City Attorney launched an investigation into Goldline and Superior Gold Group. ABC News reported that 100 customers from around the country had complained that the two firms misled them or that they received a different item than the one purchased. However the announcement didn't distinguish between Goldline and Superior, thereby failing to specify how many complaints were against Goldline and how many were against Superior, a smaller firm with an "F" rating with the Better Business Bureau. In comparison, as of September 2010, the Better Business Bureau gave Goldline an A+ rating and had received few complaints. ABC also reported that Goldline sales staff are encouraged to promote coins over bullion. ABC gave an account of a customer pressured into buying $5,000.00 of such coins which a dealer later told him were worth only $2,900.00. Another purchased $13,000.00 of "overpriced Swiss gold coins" in 2007 — while the price of gold doubled, the coins were only worth $10,764 in 2010, leaving her feeling "suckered." Consumer Reports noted that Goldline was selling a Gold Eagle set for $5,924.63 while a competitor had them for $3,295.00. However, they went on to say that Goldline's bullion prices were competitive. Goldline has claimed that collectibles have a greater markup due to their relative rarity, costs of shipping and handling, paying the sales staff, and the company's compliance department. Additionally, they claimed customers were given complete information before purchasing, "pricing is transparent," "fees and commissions are disclosed in writing," and all complaints are investigated.

The Santa Monica City Attorney set up a website for lodging complaints at www.gold.smconsumer.org. In December, 2010, a Los Angeles County judge placed Superior Gold under receivership and froze the company's assets. On November 1, 2011, Santa Monica City Attorney's Office, led by consumer protection attorney Adam Radinsky, charged Goldline International with 19 counts of theft and fraud and accused the company of "[running] a bait and switch operation." On February 22, 2012, Goldline reached a settlement with the Attorney's Office. The company agreed to an injunction that forced it to change some of its sales practices, and in particular allowed a third-party to check that Goldline disclosed all price markups to its telephone customers and adhered to the terms of the injunction. Goldline also agreed to offer refunds totaling up to 4.5 million dollars to 43 former customers. As a part of the settlement all criminal charges associated with the investigations were dropped, and further civil action against Goldline was foregone.

== See also ==
- Gold as an investment
- Silver as an investment
- Palladium as an investment
- Platinum as an investment
- Coin collecting
- Numismatics
