= Steven Markoff =

American film producer

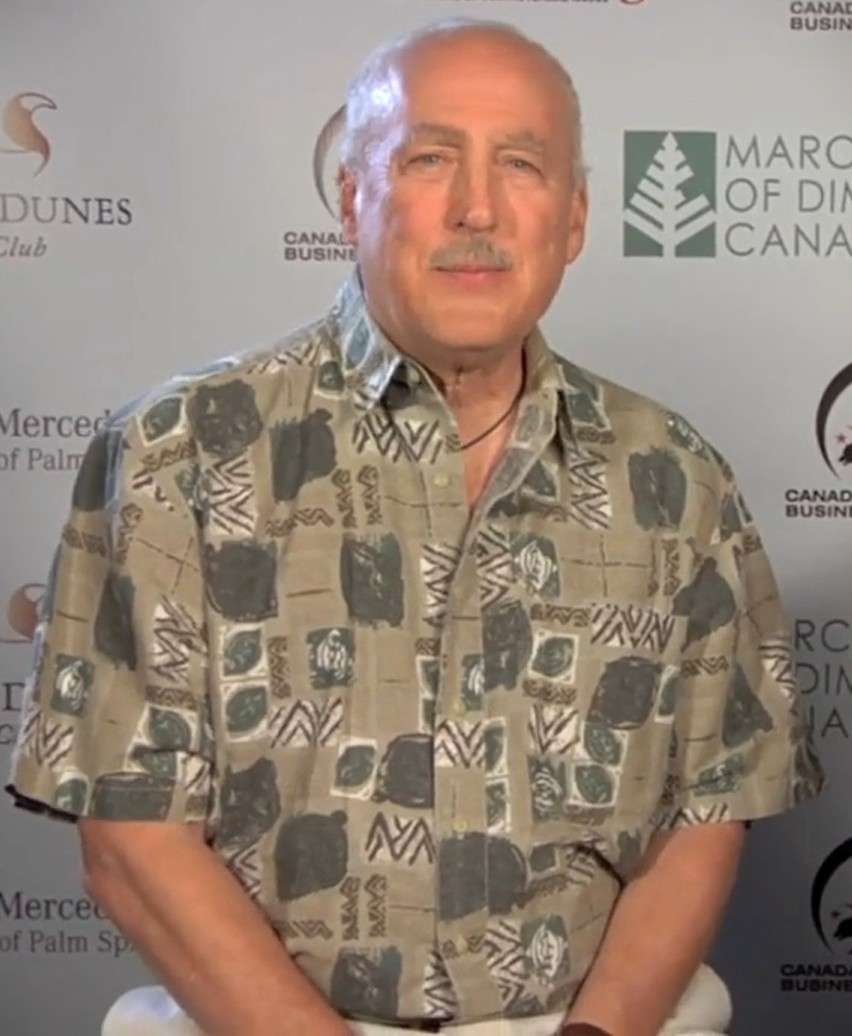
- Markoff in 2013
- Education: Los Angeles City College
- Occupations: Entrepreneur; producer; author
- Years active: 1965–present
- Known for: Founder of A-Mark Financial and ProCon.org
- Notable work: The Case Against George W. Bush
- Website: stevencmarkoff.com

Steven C. Markoff is an American entrepreneur, film producer, author, and educator. He is the founder of the A-Mark Financial Corporation, a financial services firm based in Santa Monica, California that originally traded in rare coins and precious metals. He later created a series of websites (most notably ProCon.org) with the goal of providing nonpartisan information about a wide range of social and political topics. In the mid-2000s, Markoff served as an executive producer on several films including Alpha Dog, Next Day Air and Stander. He published the non-fiction books, The Case Against George W. Bush, HANDBOOK – The First 100 Years Of The ACLU: A Compendium Of Advocacy Before The United States Supreme Court, and Misfire: The Supreme Court, The Second Amendment, Our Right to Bear Arms, through Rare Bird Books.

== Life and career ==
Steven Markoff is a native of Los Angeles. He graduated from Los Angeles City College in 1964. In 1965, Markoff founded the A-Mark Financial Corporation, a Santa Monica-based financial services company that trades in rare coins and precious metals. The company was originally known as the A-Mark Coin Company (and later A-Mark Precious Metals, Inc.). A-Mark initially operated primarily as a wholesaler of rare coins and gold and silver bullion. In addition to serving as chairman and CEO of A-Mark, Markoff also held the role of president of the American Coin Exchange in the 1970s.

In January 1976, Markoff (through A-Mark) purchased The Redfield Hoard silver dollar collection for $7.3 million. The collection consisted of over 407,000 silver dollar coins weighing a total of 12 tons. Later that year, Markoff facilitated A-Mark's purchase of the J.E. Wilkinson gold pattern coin collection, consisting of 45 coins valued at a total $5 million. The collection also featured the 1907 Indian Head Double Eagle pattern worth $1 million on its own. The coin was formerly owned by King Farouk of Egypt. Markoff saw continued success through A-Mark with sales exceeding $1 billion annually in the 1980s and 90s. In 2000, the Los Angeles Business Journal listed A-Mark Financial Corporation as the second-largest privately owned firm in Los Angeles. Greg Manning Auctions Inc. bought a majority stake in A-Mark for $16 million in 2005. Thereafter, the firm changed its name to Escala Group, then to Spectrum Group International Inc. In 2009, it purchased the remainder of A-Mark.

In 1997, Markoff founded the A-Mark Foundation with the goal of funding organizations and ventures that promote charitable, humanitarian, and/or educational causes. He also wanted to use the foundation to fund, produce, and support outlets that create nonpartisan research. This ultimately led to the 2004 foundation of ProCon.org, a nonpartisan online research database that discusses the pros and cons of a wide range of controversial social and political topics. Markoff would later create more specific websites that provided nonpartisan information on subjects like George W. Bush, Barack Obama, and the September 11 attacks. ProCon.org was eventually acquired by Encyclopædia Britannica in 2020.

In 2005, Markoff helped create the production company, A-Mark Entertainment. Other partners in the venture included Bruce McNall, Nick Cassavetes, and Robert Geringer. Markoff served as a producer or executive producer on a number of films in the 2000s, including Alpha Dog (2006), Autopsy (2008), and Next Day Air (2009). In May 2011, Markoff purchased an interest in Grauman's (TCL) Chinese Theatre in Hollywood. Markoff also purchased the Two Bunch Palms Resort & Spa in Desert Hot Springs, California in February 2012 which he later sold in 2015.

In November 2020, Markoff published the non-fiction book, The Case Against George W. Bush, via Rare Bird Books. The book discusses the George W. Bush presidential administration and Bush's handling of the September 11 attacks and the Iraq War. In the book, Markoff makes a case that President George W. Bush's handling of certain issues were actually crimes. Markoff was interviewed by Ralph Nader on the Ralph Nader Radio Hour about his book “where he dispassionately lays out the three major war crimes the former president committed by invading Iraq.” HANDBOOK – The First 100 Years Of The ACLU: A Compendium Of Advocacy Before The United States Supreme Court, Markoff's second book, became available January 2023. It received a Los Angeles Book Festival runner up award in the Wildcard Category in April 2024; Misfire: The Supreme Court, The Second Amendment, Our Right to Bear Arms, Markoff's third book, became available May 14, 2024.

== Filmography ==
Year	Title	Role	Notes
2002	No Good Deed	Executive producer	Uncredited
2003	Stander	Executive producer	
2005	Asylum	Executive producer	
2006	Alpha Dog	Executive producer	
2007	Timber Falls	Producer	
2008	Camille	Producer	Cameo as Niagara Falls Tour Guide
2008	Autopsy	Producer	
2009	Night Train	Producer	
2009	Next Day Air	Executive producer	
2009	Nine Miles Down	Producer	
2010	Beatdown	Executive producer	
2011	The Pool Boys	Executive producer	Also known as American Summer

== Bibliography ==
Year	Title	Original publisher	ISBN	Notes
2026	An Improbable Solution to the Israeli-Palestinian Conflict: Historical Events, Population, Land Ownership, and Quotes From Both Sides	Rare Bird Books		Coming Soon
2025	The First 100 Years Of The ACLU: A Compendium Of Advocacy Before The United States Supreme Court [3-volume set]	Rare Bird Books	ISBN 978-1644285107	Foreword by Erwin Chemerinsky
2024	Misfire: The Supreme Court, The Second Amendment, Our Right to Bear Arms	Rare Bird Books	ISBN 978-1644284438	
2023	HANDBOOK – The First 100 Years Of The ACLU: A Compendium Of Advocacy Before The United States Supreme Court	Rare Bird Books	ISBN 978-1644283387	Foreword by Erwin Chemerinsky
2020	The Case Against George W. Bush	Rare Bird Books	ISBN 978-1644281352	Foreword by Richard A. Clarke
