= Monex Precious Metals =

U.S. gold dealer

Monex Deposit Company
- Trade name: Monex Precious Metals
- Type: Subsidiary
- Industry: Precious metals
- Founded: 1987
- Founder: Louis E. Carabini
- Headquarters: Newport Beach, California, United States
- Products: Gold, silver, platinum, palladium bullion
- Parent: A-Mark Precious Metals (2026–present)
- Website: www.monex.com

Monex Precious Metals is the trade name of Monex Deposit Company, a U.S.-based precious metals dealer headquartered in Newport Beach, California. The company buys and sells gold, silver, platinum, and palladium bullion products to retail investors.

== History ==
Monex was founded in 1987 and traces its origins to earlier coin and precious metals trading activities established by its founder, Louis E. Carabini.

The company developed a retail precious metals business offering gold, silver, platinum, and palladium products, and introduced its Atlas Account program for leveraged precious metals transactions.

In 2026, Monex was ranked 64th in the "Banks, Investments & Loans" category of Newsweek's America's Best Online Platforms 2026, a ranking of U.S.-based online platforms compiled with market research firm Statista based on user surveys, mobile usability, traffic growth, and technical performance.

== Products and services ==
Monex offers physical precious metals products including bullion coins and bars and publishes bid and ask prices for metals for retail investors.

== Legal and regulatory matters ==
In 2017, the Commodity Futures Trading Commission (CFTC) filed a civil enforcement action against Monex Deposit Company and its principals, alleging fraud and illegal off-exchange leveraged commodity transactions related to its Atlas program.

In 2019, the United States Court of Appeals for the Ninth Circuit held that the CFTC’s claims could proceed, reversing a lower court decision.

In 2022, a federal court ordered Monex and its principals to pay restitution and civil penalties and imposed restrictions on certain activities.

== Acquisition ==
In November 2025, A-Mark Precious Metals announced an agreement to acquire Monex Deposit Company in a cash-and-stock transaction, with additional contingent consideration.

The acquisition was completed in January 2026. Following the acquisition, Monex became a subsidiary of Gold.com, the direct-to-consumer precious metals division of A-Mark Precious Metals.
