= LaVere Redfield =

American multi-millionaire (1897–1974)

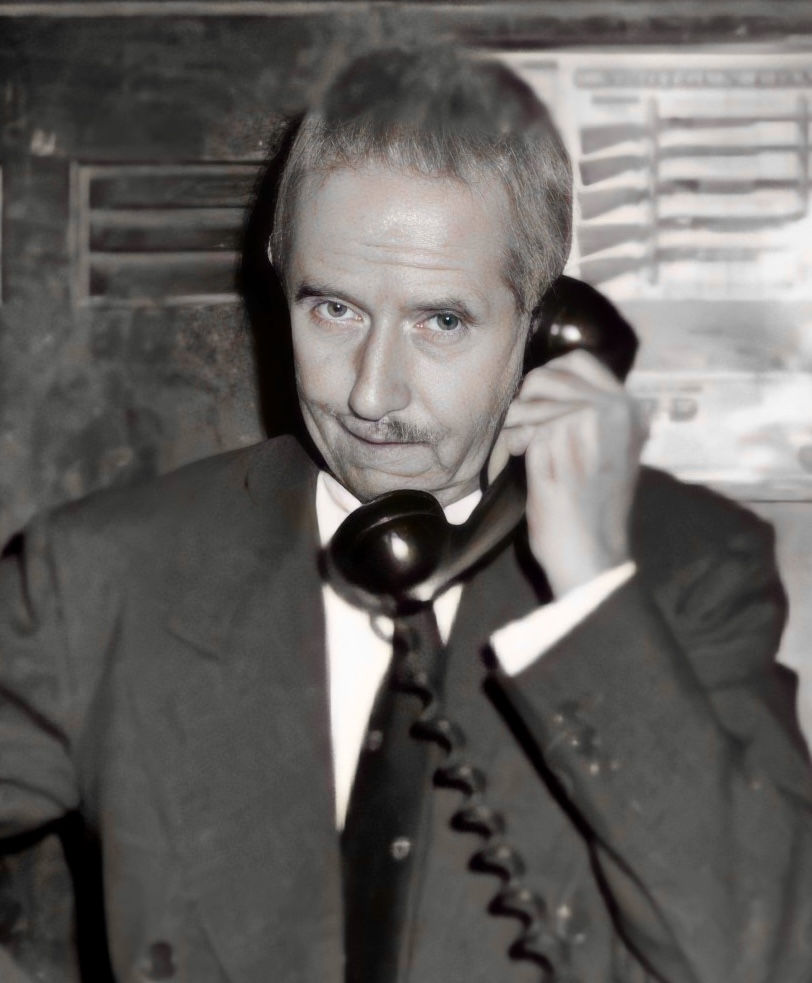
- Reno Gazette-Journal photo of LaVere Redfield on the telephone during his 1960–61 tax evasion trial
- Born: October 29, 1897; Ogden, Utah, U.S.
- Died: September 6, 1974 (aged 76); Reno, Nevada, U.S.
- Occupations: Stocks and real estate
- Known for: Silver dollar collection, burglary and eccentricity
- Criminal charges: Tax evasion
- Criminal penalty: $60,000 fine and 5 years in federal prison
- Spouse: Nell Rae (née) Jones

LaVere Redfield (October 29, 1897 – September 6, 1974) was an American financier and multi-millionaire. Redfield made his fortune in purchasing oil land in Los Angeles, investing in stocks, and buying property at tax sales during the Great Depression. When he was robbed in 1952, the multi-million dollar burglary was one of the largest ever recorded. The investigation revealed a hoard of 270,000 silver Morgan dollars and postage stamps behind a false wall in his basement. After his death in 1974, his heirs found 407,000 more silver dollars hidden in his garage and home.

== Early life ==
Redfield was born in Ogden, Utah, in 1897. His father was William Sheldon Redfield and his mother was Sarah Eleanor (née) Browning. The family was poor according to Redfield. In 1898, just one year after Redfield's birth, the family's finances worsened when William Redfield died, after which Sarah raised LaVere and his six siblings as a single mother. Redfield registered for the draft during World War I but was not inducted.

== Career ==
In his early twenties Redfield moved to Idaho Falls and worked digging potatoes. While he was still in his twenties, he moved to Burley, Idaho, where he took a job as a sales clerk and there was soon promoted to store manager. Nell Rae Jones was a widow who worked for Redfield at the store. The two began dating and Redfield saved money so that he could marry Nell. He married her in 1922 and the couple honeymooned in Los Angeles, California. Redfield discovered the stock market while on honeymoon and immediately began buying stock. In 1929 he moved to Los Angeles and he began investing in oil land.

Redfield made his fortune dealing in oil land in Los Angeles. Redfield also made money buying stock and buying property at tax sales during the Great Depression. By 1932 Redfield was a millionaire, and it is not known why the Great Depression did not ruin him. He came to Reno, Nevada, in 1935.

=== Robbery ===
On January 15, 1948, Redfield won US$2,300 (equivalent to $30,821 in 2025) playing roulette at Harold's Club in Reno, Nevada. He left the casino with the money in a paper bag. Redfield was followed by a man who demanded the money and stated that he had a gun in his pocket. Redfield would not give up the bag of money so the robber hit him in the head with a brick twelve to fifteen times. Redfield held onto the money and eventually the robber ran off. Redfield was badly hurt in the attack, but he was still clutching the bag of money. He was taken to Washoe General Hospital and he was hospitalized in serious condition.

=== Burglaries ===
In 1952 while Redfield was gambling in Reno, burglars came to his home and took his safe. The safe was initially reported to have contained US$2,500,000 in cash, securities and jewelry. At the time, the Spokane Daily Chronicle said that the burglary was "believed to be the biggest in United States history". The Deseret News called it the "richest theft in U.S. history". The FBI investigated the crime and made arrests. The crime was so well known that even FBI Director J. Edgar Hoover made a statement about arrests of suspects in the case. Eight people were arrested in connection with the burglary after an FBI investigation. In June 1952 the trial began and the FBI had to arrest Redfield when he did not appear at the trial; he was arrested on charges of evading a subpoena in San Francisco. The Knoxville News Sentinel called Redfield camera-shy and ran a photograph of him hiding his face from the cameras. A 1974 news article stated that the total of the burglary was $1.5 million and the crime was set up by Redfield's girlfriend. One newspaper, The Bend Bulletin speculated that the safe might not have contained anywhere near the $1.5 – 2.5 million that Redfield claimed.

During the investigation of the burglary police discovered a secret room in the basement of his large stone home. The room had 270,000 silver dollars along with a hoard of postage stamps. The Reno Gazette-Journal said that, "He was forced to take the money to the bank".

He was the victim of another burglary in 1961. Burglars fed steaks to Redfield's dogs while they removed two safes from his home. The contents of the safes were not disclosed. Redfield said he did not know how much was missing and he was also not sure which safe held securities and was also not sure what was in the safes. He said among the missing items, there were $1,000 and $100 bills, possibly $250,000 in securities and $10,000 in silver.

=== Tax evasion and prison ===
The Reno Evening Gazette reported that Redfield had failed to report $1,178,964 (equivalent to $13,961,416 in 2025) in income between 1953 and 1956. On June 25, 1960, a federal grand jury indicted him for evasion of taxes totaling $303,946. The maximum penalty for the charges was 40 years in prison and an $80,000 fine. The San Francisco Examiner's headline referred to Redfield as an "eccentric millionaire" and the newspaper published a photo of him shielding his face from the camera. According to his friend John Metzker, Redfield did not believe that the government had the right to impose an income tax. Redfield stated that his crime was "sloppy bookkeeping" and not tax fraud.

In October 1960 his trial began: he stated that he could not afford a lawyer so he represented himself at the trial. The trial lasted four weeks. At the conclusion of the trial there was a hearing to determine if Redfield was competent when he decided to act as his own attorney. Redfield's two psychiatrists asserted that he was so consumed with making money that he was unable to act competently when he refused an attorney. Redfield filed a motion for a new trial after he was convicted of six out of eight counts of tax evasion. The court found that he was sane. Redfield was sentenced to five years in prison and he was assessed a fine of $60,000. Held without bail, he filed a motion for the court to allow bail. On April 7, 1961, he was released on $75,000 bail.

On April 30, 1962, he reported to the U.S. Marshals office to begin serving his sentence for the 1960 conviction. He was sent to Federal Correctional Institution, Terminal Island. Redfield served just two years in prison because, according to prison authorities, he had a serious heart condition. His wife Nell had also had a heart condition and she experienced two heart attacks while he was incarcerated.

== Later life ==
After his death Redfield was called eccentric and Jack Harpster wrote a biography which referred to him as the "Silver Dollar King". According to Harper, Redfield did not trust banks, was anti-government, and was a ruthless businessman. He was also a notorious hoarder and after his death his executors found hundreds of bags of silver coins in the garage of his home. One of the reasons Redfield moved to Nevada was that the state advertised no state income tax, no corporation tax, and no inheritance tax.

Redfield was involved in more than twelve lawsuits and despite his wealth he attended city council meetings hoping to get his property taxes reduced. He would walk from his home to the casino downtown rather than drive one of his vehicles in order to avoid paying for gas. He preferred wearing flannel shirts and jeans because he wanted to be anonymous. He contacted Reno Evening Gazette publisher Rollan Melton and asked him not to let newspaper photographers take his photo.

== Death ==
On September 5, 1974, Redfield was at home when he suffered a heart attack. He was taken to the Washoe General Hospital and died September 6, 1974. Upon his death the Reno Gazette-Journal detailed many of his eccentric behaviors: for example, he drove a beat up truck, and he protested at city hall over weed abatement assessments. His body was donated to the University of Nevada, Reno's School of Medical Sciences for anatomical research. After his death his friend Donald Robb wrote an editorial stating probate for Redfield's will took five years. His fortune was worth an estimated $46 million at the time of his death. Other sources claim that he was worth 70 million or more at the time of his death. Half of the fortune was left to his wife, Nell, and half of his estate was left to his 52 year old niece Dorothy R. Deschamps. His niece claimed she had not seen Redfield since she was a little girl, but she sent him a Christmas card every year.

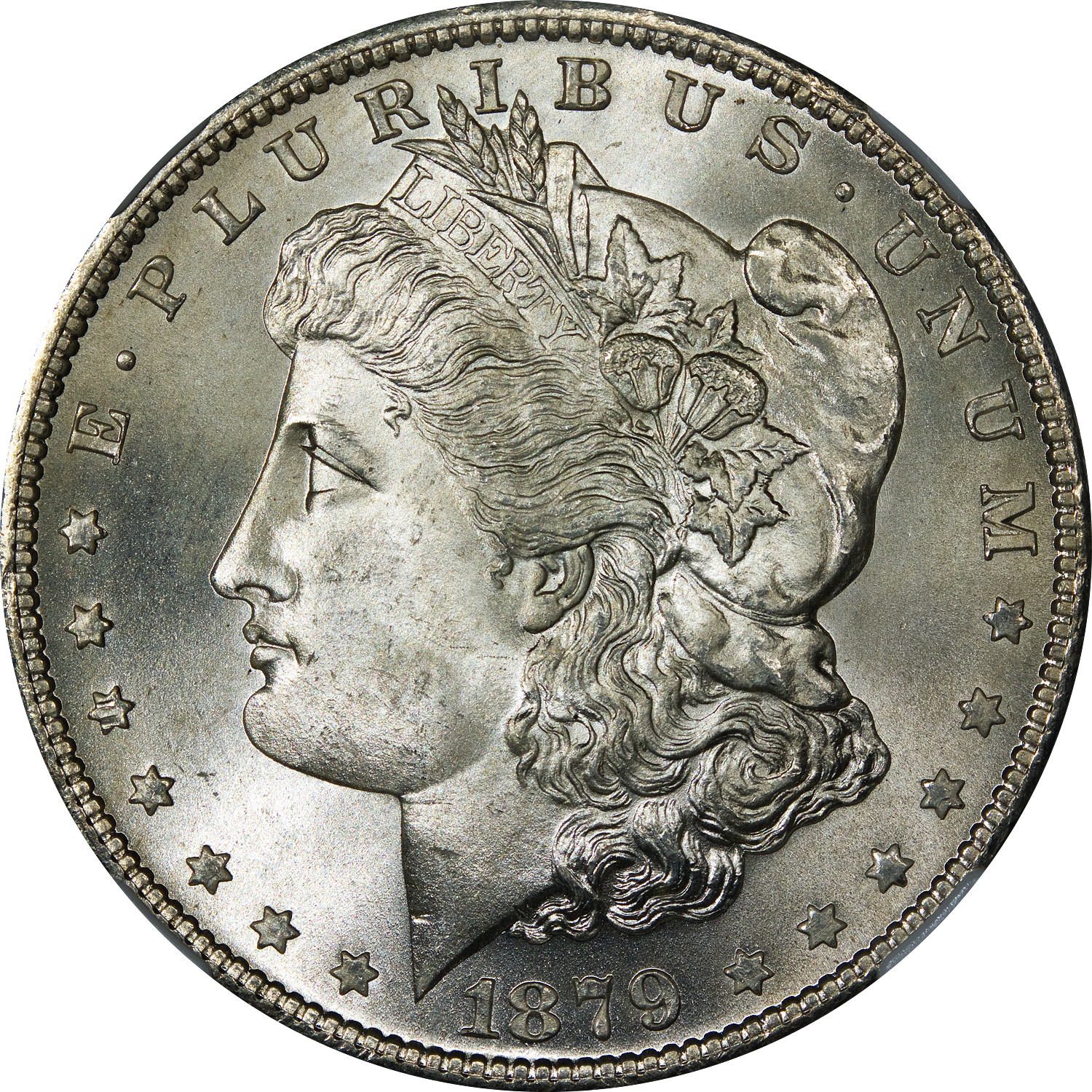
A Morgan silver dollar, the type that Redfield hoarded

=== Redfield Hoard ===
Redfield's heirs found hundreds of bags of silver dollars in his garage and home. The collection became known as the Redfield Hoard. In January 1976 Los Angeles based film producer Steven Markoff (through A-Mark Financial) purchased the LaVere Redfield silver dollar hoard for $7.3 million (equivalent to $41,302,632 in 2025). The collection consisted of over 407,000 silver dollar coins which weighed 12 tons. A-Mark Financial sold the coins individually and many came in special Paramount holders. Two major coin grading services, Numismatic Guaranty Company and Professional Coin Grading Service, have included the Redfield name on their graded coin holders. The coins were Morgan dollars and Peace dollars.

== See also ==
- List of coin collectors
