= Nicholas Deak =

American banker

Nicolas Louis Deák (8 October 1905 in Hátszeg, Transylvania, Hungary (now Hațeg, Romania) – 18 November 1985 in New York City, US) was a Hungarian-born American banker, chairman of the Deak-Perera group and a secret service operative, serving both in the OSS during World War II and its successor the CIA during the Cold War.

Deak earned a Ph.D. from the University of Neuchâtel in Switzerland in 1929. In 1939, he came to New York to open Deak & Company, a foreign exchange business. During World War II, he worked for the Office of Strategic Services, serving in Egypt, Burma, Thailand, and Malaya. In 1946, he returned to New York and resumed his business, subsequently acquiring Perera U.S., Inc. His business expanded into banking and dealing in gold coins and bullion.

His worldwide financial group, spanning both legitimate enterprises and fronts for CIA operations, was shaken in the late '70s and early '80s by multiple scandals involving money laundering and criminal connections. In 1984, Deak & Co. faced allegations from the President's Commission on Organized Crime that they laundered money for Latin American drug traffickers, facilitated the Lockheed bribery scandals, and smuggled currency from the Philippines. As a result, Deak & Co. declared bankruptcy in December 1984 in order to reorganize. In 1985, the company was purchased by a Singapore lawyer for $52 million — the most valued asset was Deak's Swiss bank. In 1986, the foreign exchange and gold business was sold to Australia's Martin Properties Ltd. (later renamed Deak Morgan) for $12 million. In the following year, the company was transferred to New Zealand-based NZI and expanded its gold coin dealerships by one-third. At the same time, Deak Investor Services, Inc. changed its name to Deak International Goldline Ltd.

On November 18, 1985, a mentally unstable and homeless woman, Lois Lang, entered Deak's office and shot and killed both Deak and his receptionist. Lang was arrested and tried in court. She had claimed that she was a part-owner of Deak & Co. and said that she had suffered some injustice from the company. She was initially institutionalized at Kirby Forensic Psychiatric Center, but later sent to Bedford Hills Correctional Facility for Women. Because of Deak's work for the intelligence community and the company's involvement with money laundering, some theories have been suggested that Deak was targeted for assassination.
