= Redfield Hoard =

Hoard of silver dollars found in Reno, Nevada

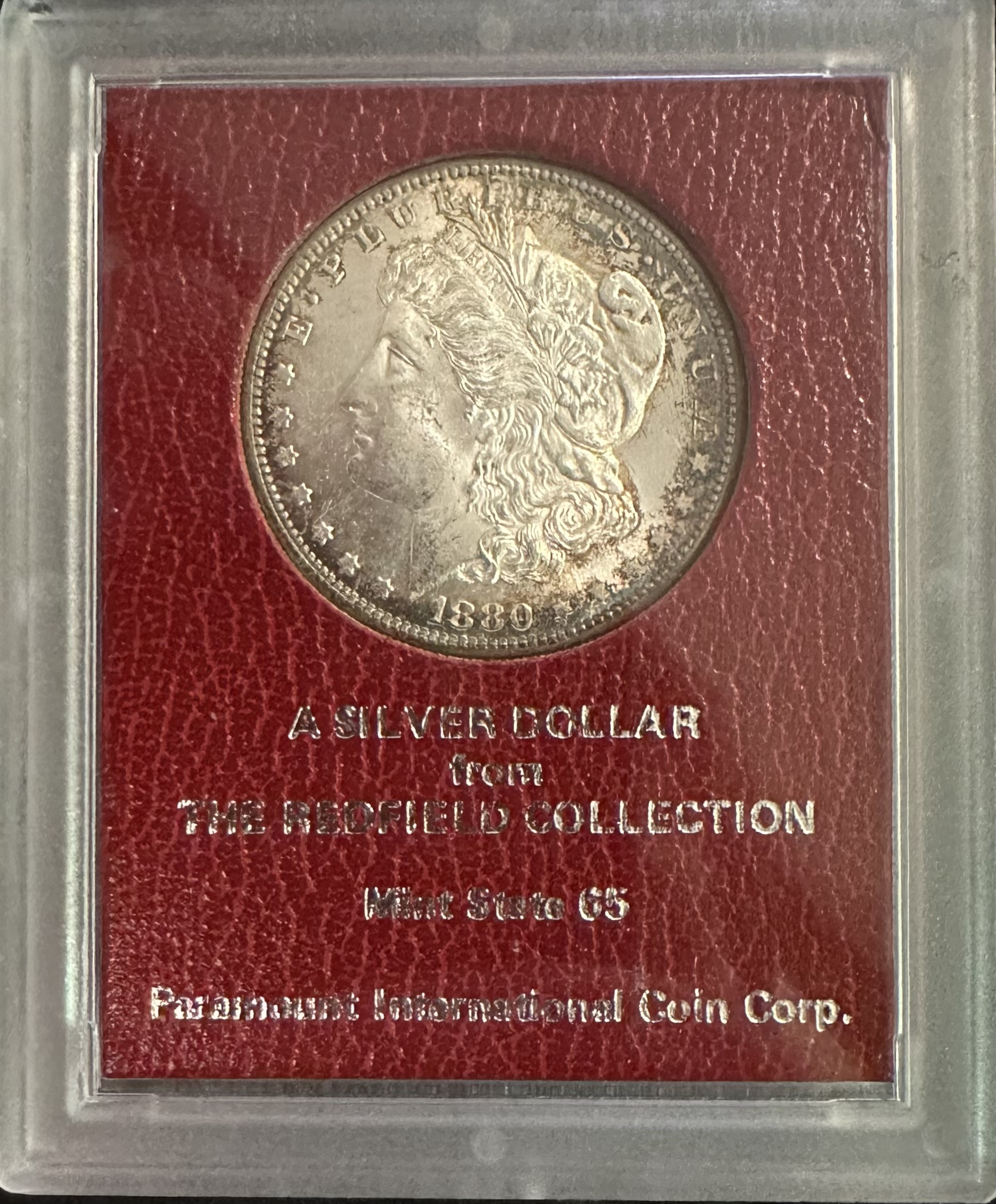
1880 S Morgan dollar from the Redfield Hoard slabbed in a red Paramount holder

The Redfield Hoard was LaVere Redfield's collection of 407,000 silver Morgan and Peace dollars. The hoard was discovered in Reno, Nevada, at the home of LaVere Redfield after his death in 1974.

Redfield was burglarized in 1952 and at that time he had already amassed a hoard of 270,000 silver dollars. He claimed that the authorities who investigated the burglary forced him to take the silver dollars to the bank at that time. His home was burglarized again in 1963 and newspapers in the 1980s reported that 100,000 silver dollars were taken, a figure which was disputed by Jack Harpster's book The curious life of Nevada's LaVere Redfield : The Silver Dollar King.

Redfield did not trust banks and paper money so he continued to collect silver dollars. He was dubbed the "Silver dollar king" after the discovery of the silver dollar hoard in 1974. From the mid 1960s to 1974 he hoarded more than 400,000 silver dollars. The entire hoard was sold to A-Mark Financial for US$7.3 million (equivalent to US$41.3 million in 2025).

== Background ==
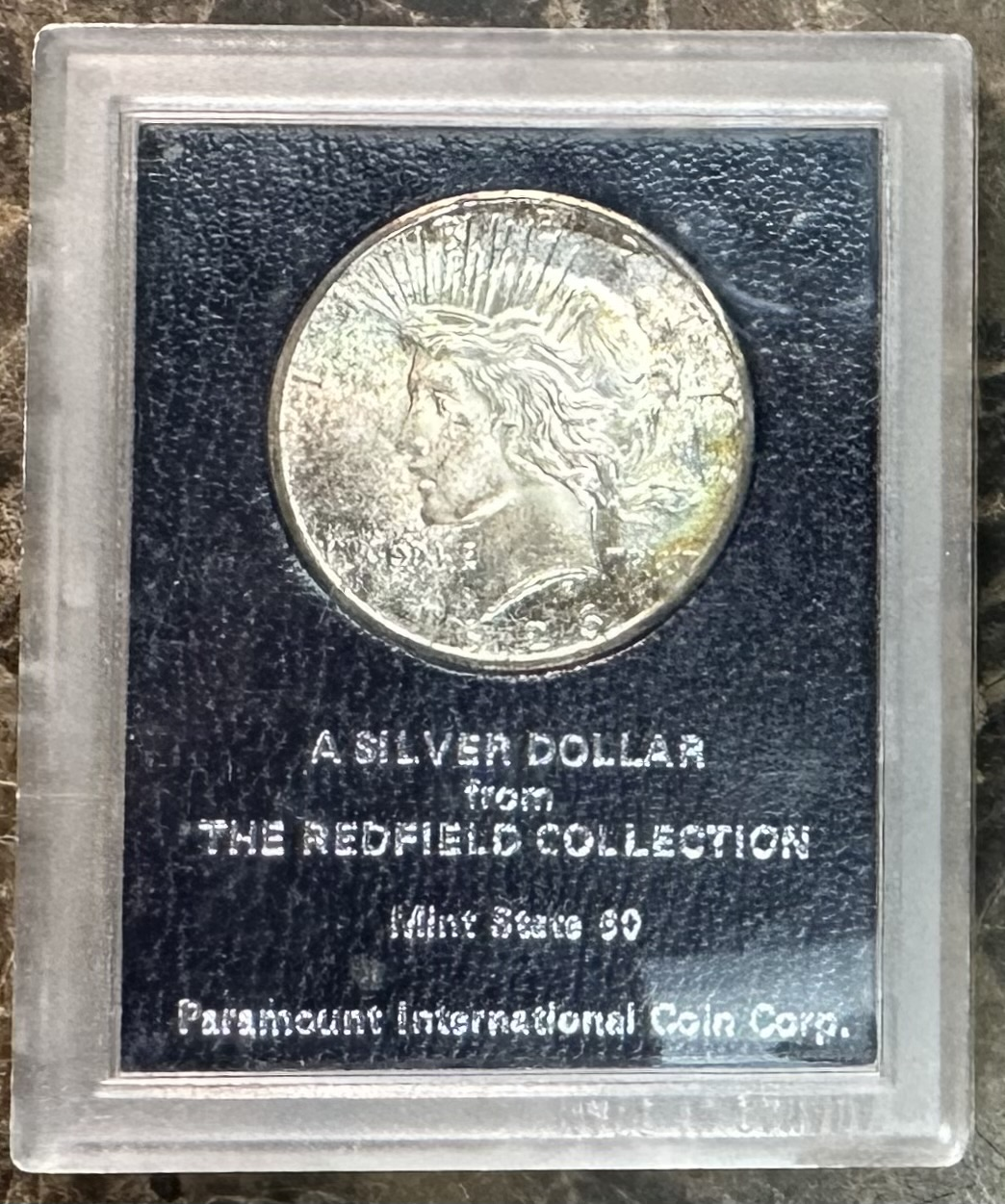
Peace dollar from the Redfield Hoard slabbed in a black Paramount holder

In 1952 LaVere Redfield's silver dollar hoarding was discovered. Redfield's home was burglarized and on investigation of the burglary police discovered a secret room in the basement of his large stone home. The room had 270,000 silver dollars along with a hoard of postage stamps. The Reno Gazette-Journal said that, "He was forced to take the money to the bank". He was the victim of another burglary in 1963. Burglars fed steaks to Redfield's dogs while they removed two safes from his home. The contents of the safes were not disclosed. Newspaper reports claimed that he lost 100,000 silver dollars in the 1963 burglary. Redfield continued to collect silver dollars until his death. In Jack Harpster's book The curious life of Nevada's LaVere Redfield : The Silver Dollar King, Harpster claims that there is no source to confirm the figure of 100,000 silver dollars and 10,000 silver dollars were stolen.

== History ==
After Redfield's death in 1974 Redfield's heirs found hundreds of bags of silver dollars in his Reno, Nevada, garage and home. It was thought that it took Redfield more than forty years to accumulate the silver dollars. He did not trust paper money and used money that he made in the stock market to hoard silver dollars.

The Star Democrat reported that Redfield sent bags of silver dollars down the coal chute at his home. The chute led to a room in the basement where Redfield also stored jars of peaches. The newspaper reported that he had food "stored in great quantity". Summer heat apparently led to peach jars exploding and the juice sprayed on some of the silver dollars. Redfield was not a coin collector so he did not take care while handling or storing the coins. Writing for the Helena Independent Record, Angus White said the Redfield hoard was the "largest quantity of silver dollars individually owned and amassed in one place in history".

In January 1976 Los Angeles based film producer Steven Markoff (through A-Mark Financial) purchased the LaVere Redfield silver dollar hoard for US$7.3 million (equivalent to US$41.3 million in 2025). The collection consisted of over 407,000 silver dollar coins which weighed 12 tons. A-Mark Financial sold the coins individually and many came in a Paramount coin slab. Two major coin grading services, Numismatic Guaranty Company and Professional Coin Grading Service, have included the Redfield name on their graded coin holders. The coins were United States silver dollars: Morgan and Peace dollars.

When Redfield died in 1974 he was referred to as an eccentric man. Jack Harpster wrote a biography which dubbed him the "Silver Dollar King." According to Harper, Redfield did not trust banks, was anti-government, and was a ruthless businessman.
