= Lockheed bribery scandals =

Mid-20th-century political scandals

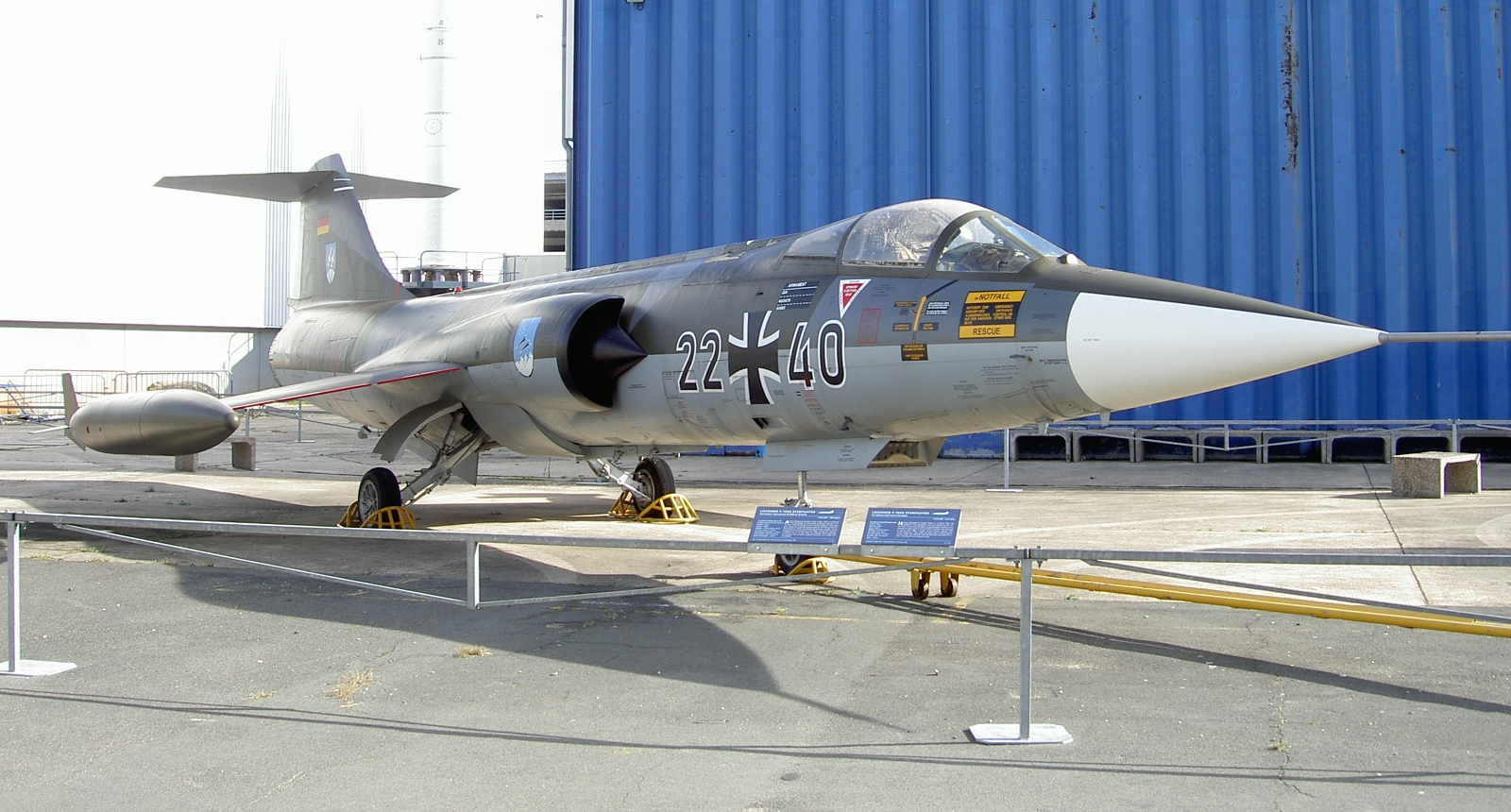
Lockheed F-104G Starfighter in Luftwaffe markings

From the late 1950s to the 1970s, officials of U.S. aerospace company Lockheed paid bribes in the process of negotiating the sale of aircraft. The scandal caused considerable political controversy in West Germany, Italy, the Netherlands, and Japan. In the U.S., the scandal nearly led to Lockheed's downfall, as it was already struggling due to the commercial failure of the L-1011 TriStar airliner.

== Background ==
Through the Emergency Loan Guarantee Act of 1971, the Emergency Loan Guarantee Board was created to manage federally guaranteed private loans up to $250 million to Lockheed Corporation. The guarantee program would have the U.S. government assume the private debt of Lockheed if it defaulted on its debts. In August 1975 the board investigated whether Lockheed violated its obligations by failing to tell the board about foreign payments made to Lockheed. On October 14, 1977, Lockheed and its 24 lending banks entered into a credit agreement, providing for a $100 million revolving line of credit, to replace the government guarantee commitment; this was used to retire $60 million worth of Lockheed debt. The Emergency Loan Guarantee Board approved the new credit agreement on October 14, 1977 through a termination agreement that closed the Government Emergency Loan Guarantee Board after issuance of its final report on September 30, 1977. Fees paid by Lockheed and its banks to the Board for administering the program loan netted around $30 million, which was sent to the U.S. Treasury.

In late 1975 and early 1976, a subcommittee of the U.S. Senate led by Senator Frank Church concluded that members of the Lockheed board had paid members of friendly governments to guarantee contracts for military aircraft. In 1976, it was revealed that Lockheed had paid $22 million in bribes to foreign officials in the process of negotiating the sale of aircraft, including the F-104 Starfighter, the so-called "Deal of the Century".

== West Germany ==
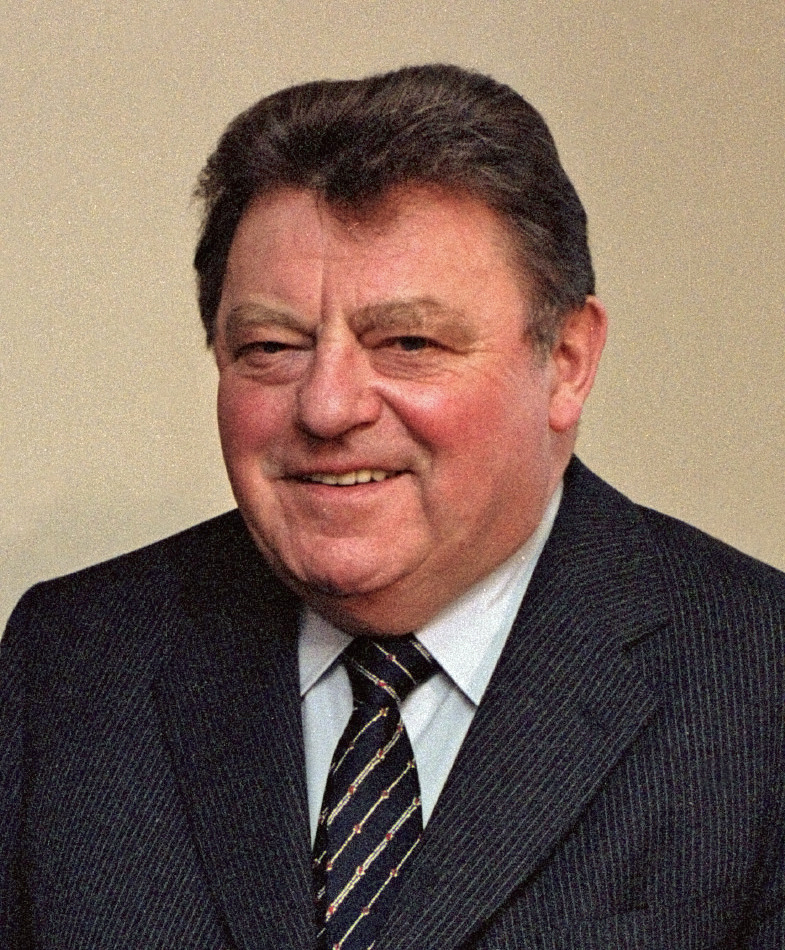
Franz Josef Strauss in 1982

Former Lockheed lobbyist Ernest Hauser told Senate investigators that West German Minister of Defence Franz Josef Strauss and his party had received at least $10 million for the purchase of 900 F-104G Starfighters in 1961. The party and its leader denied the allegations, and Strauss filed a slander suit against Hauser. As the allegations were not corroborated, the issue was dropped.

In September 1976, in the final phase of the West German federal election, the controversy was re-opened when questions were asked about the whereabouts of the "Lockheed documents" within the Federal Ministry of Defence. Anonymous sources also distributed several, possibly falsified, documents to the media. According to one of these documents, member of the German Bundestag and its defense council Manfred Wörner accepted an invitation by Lockheed to visit their aircraft plants in the U.S. with the entire trip being paid for by Lockheed. In the course of the investigations, it emerged that most of the documents related to the Starfighter purchase had been destroyed in 1962. The whereabouts of the documents were again discussed in a committee of inquiry meeting of the Bundestag between January 1978 and May 1979. An investigation of Lockheed documents by the U.S. revealed that Wörner's trip had been financed by the German Bundestag, and was related to a test flight with the Lockheed S-3 Viking. Only part of the travel costs of Wörner's secretary, and Wörner's flight back from the US to Germany was paid by Lockheed:

Woerner [sic] is a pilot and Lockheed wanted him to fly the A-3 [sic].^{Note} Woerner [sic] was accompanied by his secretary and a portion of her expenses were paid by Lockheed. Further, Woerner [sic] "lost" his government paid ticket back to Germany and Lockheed "accommodated" him by giving him another ticket.

^Note The A-3 is a different aircraft manufactured by a different company – the Douglas A-3 Skywarrior, manufactured by the Douglas Aircraft Company from 1956 to 1961.

== Italy ==
The Italian branch of the Lockheed scandal involved the bribery of Christian Democrat and Socialist politicians to favor the purchase by the Italian Air Force of C-130 Hercules transport planes. The allegations of bribery were supported by political magazine L'Espresso, and targeted former Cabinet ministers Luigi Gui and Mario Tanassi, the former Prime Minister Mariano Rumor and President Giovanni Leone, forcing him to resign on June 15, 1978.

== Japan ==
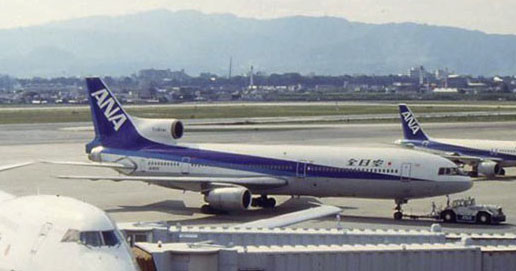
An All Nippon Airways L-1011 TriStar at Osaka International Airport in 1992

The scandal involved the Marubeni Corporation and several high-ranking members of Japanese political, business, and underworld circles, including Finance Minister Eisaku Satō and the JASDF Chief of Staff Minoru Genda. In 1957, the Japanese Air Self-Defense Force wished to buy the Grumman F11F-1F Super Tiger to replace the F-86 Sabre then in service, but heavy lobbying by Lockheed of key Liberal Democratic Party figures led to the adoption of the F-104 instead.

Later, Lockheed hired underworld figure Yoshio Kodama as a consultant in order to influence Japanese parastatal airlines, including All Nippon Airways (ANA), to buy the Lockheed L-1011 TriStar instead of the McDonnell Douglas DC-10. On February 6, 1976, the vice-chairman of Lockheed told the Senate subcommittee that Lockheed had paid approximately $3 million (equivalent to $17 million in 2025) in bribes to the office of Japanese Prime Minister Kakuei Tanaka for aid in the matter.

Lockheed paid ¥2.4 billion (equivalent to $58.7 million in 2025) to earn the contract from ANA. ¥500 million ($12.2 million in 2025) of the total was received by the Prime Minister. ¥160 million ($3.91 million in 2025) was received by ANA officials. ¥1.7 billion ($41.6 million in 2025) was received by Kodama. On October 30, 1972, ANA announced its decision to purchase 21 Lockheed L-1011 Tristars, which cost approximately $5 million each, totaling $105 mi ($808 million in 2025), even though it had previously announced options to purchase the DC-10. The 1986 US President's Commission on Organized Crime revealed that from 1969 to 1975 Lockheed used Deak & Company, a large foreign exchange operator owned by Nicholas Deak, as the conduit to transfer money intended by Lockheed to bribe Japanese officials. It was disclosed that US$8.3 million ($63.9 million in 2025) was moved to Deak's offices in Hong Kong, where a Spanish-born priest representing Lockheed took the cash and carried it to Japan.

On March 23, 1976, in protest of the scandal, actor Mitsuyasu Maeno made a suicide attack on Kodama's Tokyo home by crashing a light aircraft onto it. Maeno died and two servants were injured. Kodama himself was unharmed.

Tanaka was arrested on July 27, 1976, and was released in August on a ¥200 million ($690,000) bond. He was found guilty by a Tokyo court on October 12, 1983, for violations of foreign exchange control laws but not on bribery. He was sentenced to four years in prison, but remained free on appeal until his death in 1993.

Tanaka's involvement would be the subject of Sega's 1985 video game Gombe's I'm Sorry (ごんべえのあいむそ〜り〜, Gonbē no Aimusōrī; released in English as simply I'm Sorry).

== The Netherlands ==
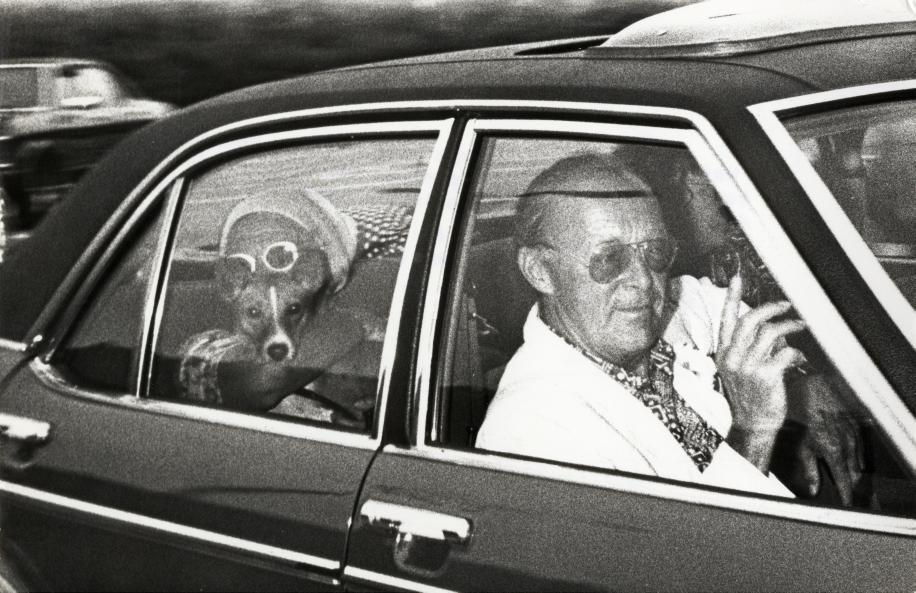
The Dutch Prince Bernhard and Queen Juliana returning from Italy because of developments in the Lockheed scandal. In the back seat Juliana with her dog Sara. The Netherlands, August 26, 1976.

In December 1975, it surfaced that Prince Bernhard of the Netherlands received a $1.1 million bribe in the early 1960s from Lockheed to ensure the Lockheed F-104 would win out over the Dassault Mirage 5 for the purchase contract. He had served on more than 300 corporate boards or committees worldwide and had been praised in the Netherlands for his efforts to promote the economic well-being of the country.

Prime Minister Joop den Uyl ordered an inquiry into the affair, while Prince Bernhard refused to answer reporters' questions, stating: "I am above such things". The results of the inquiry led to a constitutional crisis in which Queen Juliana threatened to abdicate if Bernhard was prosecuted. Bernhard was spared, but had to step down from several public positions and was forbidden to wear his military uniforms again.

Prince Bernhard always denied the charges, but after his death on December 1, 2004, interviews were published showing that he admitted taking the money. He said: "I have accepted that the word Lockheed will be carved on my tombstone."

Declassified correspondences between U.S. Ambassador to the Netherlands Kingdon Gould Jr. and Henry Kissinger showed that Kissinger was informed of the bribes in 1975.

== Saudi Arabia ==
Between 1970 and 1975, Lockheed paid Saudi arms dealer Adnan Khashoggi $106 million in commissions. His commissions started at 2.5% and eventually rose to as much as 15%. Khashoggi "became for all practical purposes a marketing arm of Lockheed. Adnan would provide not only an entrée but strategy, constant advice, and analysis", according to Max Helzel, then vice president of Lockheed's international marketing.

== Aftermath ==
Lockheed chairman of the board Daniel Haughton and vice chairman and president Carl Kotchian resigned from their posts on February 13, 1976. The scandal also played a part in the formulation of the Foreign Corrupt Practices Act which President Jimmy Carter signed into law on December 19, 1977, which made it illegal for American persons and entities to bribe foreign government officials.

According to Ben Rich, director of Lockheed's Skunk Works:

Lockheed executives admitted paying millions in bribes over more than a decade to the Dutch (Prince Bernhard, husband of Queen Juliana, in particular), to key Japanese and West German politicians, to Italian officials and generals, and to other highly placed figures from Hong Kong to Saudi Arabia, in order to get them to buy our airplanes. Kelly [referring to Clarence "Kelly" Johnson, first team leader of the Skunk Works] was so sickened by these revelations that he had almost quit, even though the top Lockheed management implicated in the scandal resigned in disgrace.

== See also ==
- Al-Yamamah arms deal
- Captain Lockheed and the Starfighters
- Military-industrial complex
