= ProCon.org =

Non-profit educational organization

- Owner: Encyclopaedia Britannica
- Website: www.procon.org
- Commercial: No
- Launched: July 12, 2004; 22 years ago

ProCon.org is a non-profit charitable organization headquartered in Santa Monica, California in the United States. It operates the ProCon.org website, an online resource for research on controversial issues. The content of ProCon.org is produced by five staff researchers, and its stated mission is "Promoting critical thinking, education, and informed citizenship by presenting controversial issues in a straightforward, nonpartisan, primarily pro-con format." It was acquired by Encyclopædia Britannica in 2020.

== History ==
ProCon.org was formed under section 501(c)(3) of the US Internal Revenue Code as a public charity in Santa Monica on July 12, 2004 by Steven C. Markoff, a Los Angeles businessman, who is also the founder of A-Mark Precious Metals and co-chairman of A-Mark Entertainment, a film production company. In May 2020, Britannica Group, the company behind Encyclopaedia Britannica, announced its acquisition of ProCon.org.

The organization's first managing editor, Kamy Akhavan, was hired on December 12, 2004. ProCon.org's first appearance in the media was on June 6, 2005, when its material on medicinal marijuana was referenced by the BBC. Akhavan was promoted from Managing Editor to President in 2010. The organization's board of directors consists of Markoff, his wife Jadwiga S.Z.-Markoff, John Kurtz, Stanley F. Shimohara and Bruce McNall.

ProCon.org was acquired by Encyclopædia Britannica in 2020.

=== Recognition ===
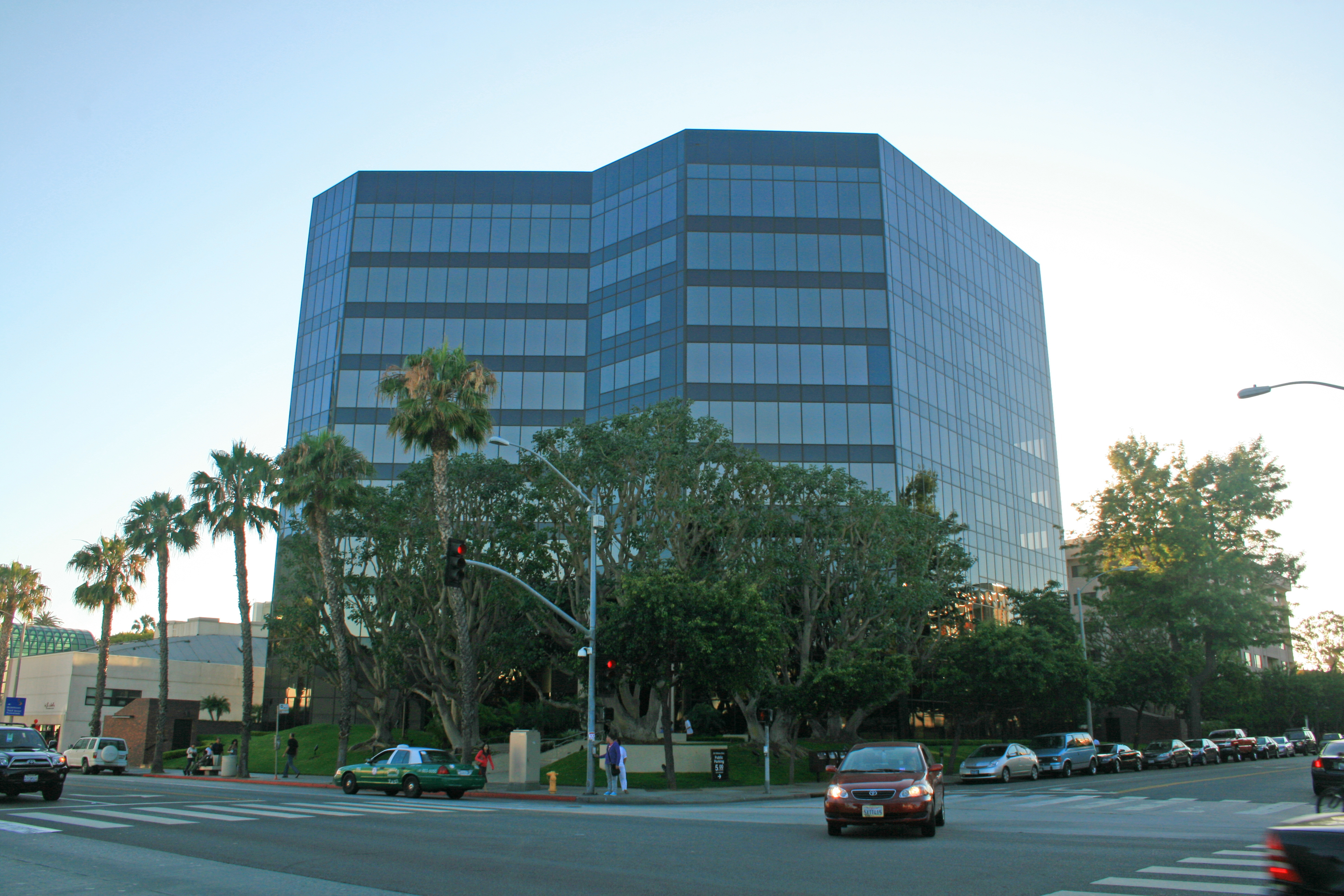
233 Wilshire Blvd, Santa Monica, CA, the building in which the office of ProCon.org is located

In addition, as of November 2, 2009, these materials were regularly being used by schools in all 50 states. Twelve international governments, 27 state governments, and many federal agencies have referenced ProCon.org including the US Dept. of Education, US Substance Abuse and Mental Health Services Administration (SAMHSA), Office of National Drug Control Policy, and the Congressional Research Service. In 2008, the Library of Congress archived three of ProCon.org's webpages as "materials of historical importance to the Congress and to the American people." Its materials on medical marijuana have been used by such governmental entities as the Office of National Drug Control Policy and the Congressional Research Service.

On February 2, 2009, ProCon.org received the "Best Non-Profit to Work For" award from opportunityknocks.org.

A division of the American Library Association voted ProCon.org as one of the "Top 25 Free Reference Websites of 2011" on June 17, 2011. (Other resources included on this list are WikiLeaks and Google Translate.) As a result of winning this award, the organization was honored by Congressman Rob Andrews (D-NJ) in the U.S. House of Representatives.

== Content ==
As of November 2013, the site covered 49 topics, including such historically controversial issues as prostitution, illegal immigration, sports and drugs, insider trading, abortion, the death penalty, euthanasia, drinking age, gay marriage, voting machines, presidential elections, the Iraq War, the ACLU, medical marijuana, the Pledge of Allegiance, video game violence, and the origins of sexual orientation. More recent topics include the 2012 presidential election, college education, Obamacare, standardized tests, teacher tenure, vegetarianism, animal testing, felony disenfranchisement, the gold standard, and man-made climate change.

Each issue site contains collections of questions about the issue. After an introductory overview, the topic is then broken into subcategories and sub questions which are organized into "pro" and "con" columns. The columns list the quoted arguments of different experts on that particular subject. For example, the drug use in sports section includes responses from Lance Armstrong, Gene Upshaw, and various scientists and specialists. ProCon.org staffers assess each source, assigning a self-defined "Theoretical Expertise" ranking system to rank expert responses on a scale of one star (for lowest expertise) to five stars (for highest expertise).

ProCon.org users are encouraged by the organization to volunteer, donate, and propose new questions and topics. An approval process exists in which the topic, core question, and 1-minute overview must be approved by both the Chairman and Managing Editor.

=== Research projects ===
In addition to its collection of pro-con questions, ProCon.org develops proprietary research projects containing information on select subjects. In May 2008, ProCon.org published its "Fart Chart," which provided details on the dairy industry's greenhouse gas emissions from ruminant animals.

In July 2009, ProCon.org's chart "Deaths from Marijuana v. 17 FDA-Approved Drugs" was referenced in a CBS News article about anti-drug campaigns. In October 2009, ProCon.org released a resource detailing the top ten richest US Senators' top stock trades in 2007 and the potential conflicts of interest that might arise from these trades.

== Reception ==
The organization's materials have been referenced over 950 times by publications and media outlets, including TIME, the Los Angeles Times, the Merced Sun-Star, ABC News, the Daily World, Courrier International, The New York Times, Press TV, The Washington Post, Education Week, and the Seattle Post-Intelligencer. Akhavan has been interviewed by Pete the Planner, Minyanville, On Board, Fox Business, ABC News, and Voice of America.

As of 2013, 241 books had referenced or mentioned ProCon.org in some way.

Paul Krugman, a Nobel Prize–winning economist and op-ed columnist, used ProCon.org in his breakdown of the U.S. Affordable Care Act in 2011.

=== Education ===
In 2010, the Washington State Office of Superintendent of Public Instruction listed the site as a recommended resource for social studies. The website has also been listed as a resource by the Utah State Office of Education and Michigan Department of Education. ProCon.org has been endorsed by the California State Superintendent of Public Instruction, and the CA Department of Education.

In his 2011 book, Michael J. Schmoker stated that ProCon.org is a useful website for science teachers, especially when teaching such subjects as alternative energy versus fossil fuels, cell phones and nuclear power.

=== Medicinal marijuana ===
ProCon.org's materials on medical marijuana have been used as a resource by 12 governmental entities, including the Congressional Research Service, the State of Michigan, the Office of National Drug Control Policy, the Hawaii Department of Public Safety, the New Jersey Department of Health and Senior Services, the Superior Court of the State of California, and the Connecticut Department of Mental Health and Addiction Services. These materials have been used in both pro- and anti-marijuana contexts.
