= Nine Miles Down =

2009 horror film by Anthony Waller

- Film poster
- Directed by: Anthony Waller
- Written by: Everett De Roche; Anthony Waller
- Produced by: Bruce McNall; Steven Markoff; Thomas Hedman; Anthony Waller
- Starring: Adrian Paul; Kate Nauta; Meredith Ostrom
- Cinematography: Roger Simonsz
- Edited by: Jamie Trevill
- Music by: Stephen W. Parsons; Andrew Fisher
- Distributed by: Seven Arts Pictures
- Release date: October 31, 2009 (Horrorfest)
- Running time: 86 minutes
- Countries: United Kingdom; Hungary; United States
- Language: English
- Budget: $22 million

Nine Miles Down is a 2009 horror film based on the Well to Hell, a widespread urban legend (spread mostly in the 1990s) that Russian scientists had drilled so deep that they had broken through into hell and recorded the screams of the damned emanating from the borehole. It was the last feature film credit for writer Everett de Roche. It is an international co-production between the UK, Hungary, and the US.

== Plot ==
Thomas "Jack" Jackmann, an ex-policeman turned security inspector for the GNE energy firm, arrives at the Jevel Afra Drill site, a remote research station in the Central Sahara Desert during a sandstorm. None of the facility's 25 staff, led by Professor Borman, have been heard from in days.

Jack finds the site abandoned with signs of a struggle, cryptic Arabic messages scrawled on the walls with blood, and a ritually sacrificed jackal. He sends photos of the writings to be translated. Unable to properly search due to the storm, he investigates video recordings, discovering that Borman had established the dig site to investigate a newly-detected air pocket nine miles below the surface. The scientists then began to exhibit paranoia; Jack experiences a vivid hallucination while trying to sleep in his vehicle.

By morning, the storm clears, and Jack meets Dr. Jenny "JC" Christensen, the lone remaining scientist. She shares that Borman was murdered by the chief geologist and stored in the refrigeration unit, along with Dr. Varga, who died of a heart attack. Jack calls this in, but the police are tied up searching; Chief Caswell orders him to stay put in case others return. JC, meanwhile, is anxious to leave; Jack finds her suspicious, having not seen her in videos or photos of the team. While recovering from accidentally hitting his head, she attempts to steal his vehicle, but he hides the keys. Kat later reports that one scientist, Dr. Ivanoff, was found alive and that JC did not appear on the crew roster; she explains that due to budget constraints not allowing gender-segregated quarters, Borman falsified her information.

JC recounts that, six days prior, audio sensors on the drill had picked up noise like human screams from inside the cavity. Fearing they had broken through to Hell, the crew then began to hallucinate seeing dead loved ones, panicking, and becoming violent; Jack also begins to see things and act nervous. The two develop a mutual attraction while watching the desert sunset, sharing dinner to celebrate Jack's birthday. He shares his severe trauma from his wife Susan killing herself and their two children six years prior over suspicions of an affair, resulting in his resignation from the police force. To comfort him, Jack and JC sleep together, but his symptoms worsen due to resurfaced distress.

Jack begins to suspect that JC is demonic. Arming himself, he discovers human remains in the site's cesspit and attacks JC. She fends him off, so he locks himself in Borman's office, finding the professor's hidden recording believing that they had unwittingly unleashed the Devil. In a ploy to get Jack's keys, JC plays along with his delusions and almost succeeds, but Jack, reliving the murder-suicide, wounds her with a screwdriver before setting the facility on fire. A GNE rescue team arrives, subduing Jack and evacuating them both via helicopter before the site explodes.

Caswell and Inspector Khaled back up JC's story at the hospital, explaining that Ivanoff provided a sample of toxic gas released from the underground cavity. Inhaling it caused the afflicted to lose the ability to differentiate between reality, memory, and imagination; JC had been less affected due to her separated quarters. The remaining scientists are still missing and presumed dead, scattered in the desert. Despite these revelations, Jack's paranoia quickly resurfaces; he steals a handgun and tries to kill JC before being stopped by his coworker Alex. His sanity truly broken, Jack prepares to commit suicide to the laughter of his dead wife, forever.

== Cast ==
- Adrian Paul as Thomas "Jack" Jackmann
- Kate Nauta as Dr. Jenny "JC" Christensen
- Anthony Waller as Professor M. Borman
- Amanda Douge as Kat
- Meredith Ostrom as Susan Jackmann
- Arcadiy Golubovich as Alex
- Andrew Ryback as Chief Caswell
- Caroline Couret-Delègue as Journalist
- Yousef Amin as Yousef
- David Story as Dr. Varga
- Madeline C. Dickson as Anna
- Brandon Dailman as Ben
- Jutta Kleinschmidt as Helicopter Rescue Pilot
- Hafiene Ahmed as Inspector Khaled
- Adrian Lukis as Dr. Leonard
- Clelie Saint-Val as Old Woman in Hospital
- Wajden Turki as Nurse

== Production ==
Val Kilmer was in talks to star in May 2002. Production ended in May 2008.

== Reception ==
Mark L. Miller of Ain't It Cool News called it "a devilishly pleasant surprise" that fulfills its promising concept.
