= Carl Kotchian =

American businessman (1914–2008)

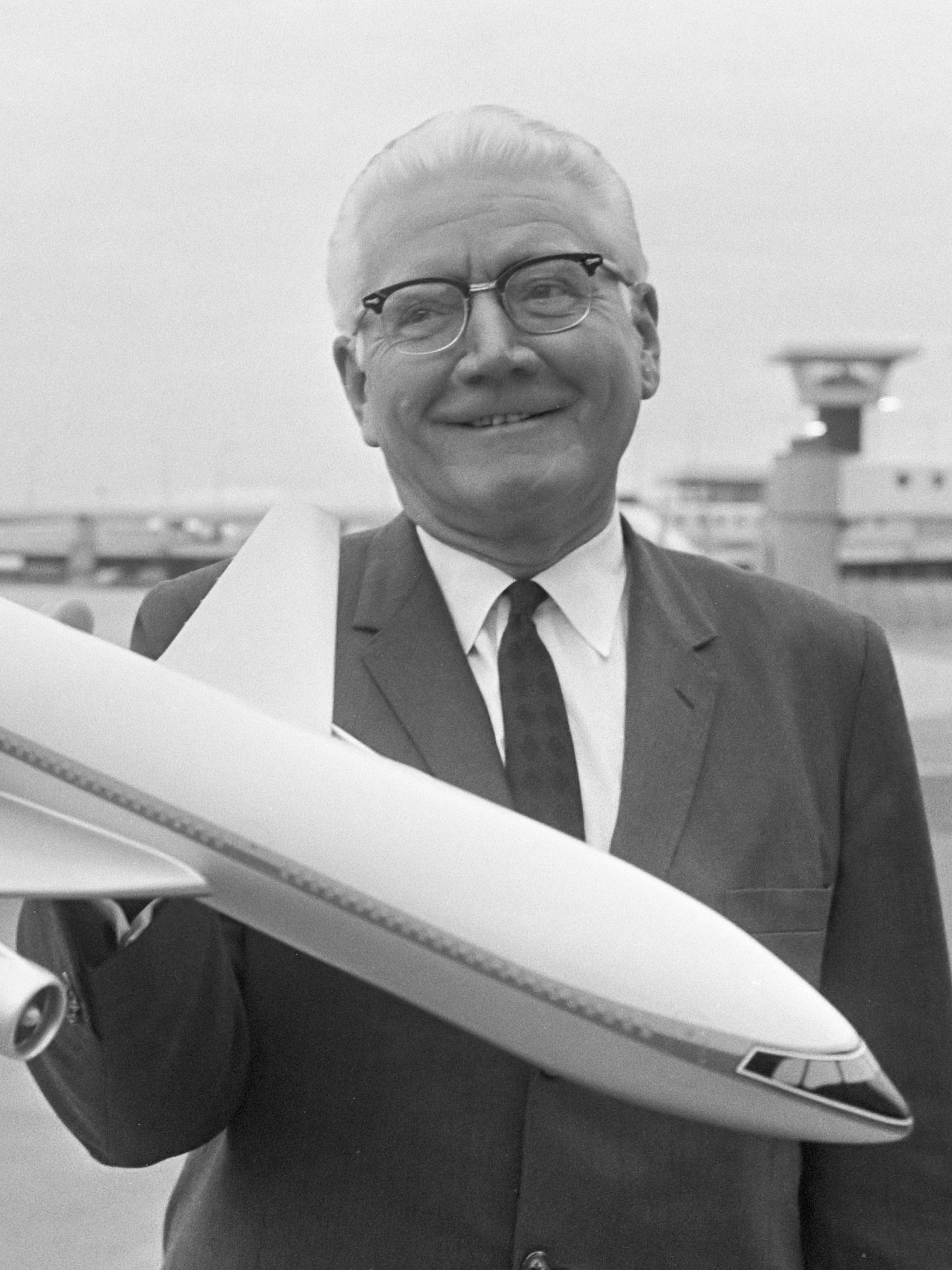
Archibald Carl Kotchian with a model of the L-1011 TriStar (1967)

Archibald Carlisle Kotchian (July 17, 1914 – December 14, 2008), known as Carl or A.C., was an American business executive who served as the president of Lockheed Corporation. His admission of paying millions of dollars in bribes to foreign government officials led to the jailing of Japan's prime minister and political upheaval in several countries in the 1970s.

Kotchian was born on July 17, 1914, in Kermit, Divide County, North Dakota, and grew up in Long Beach, California, attending Long Beach Junior College (now known as Long Beach City College). He later attended Stanford University, where he received an undergraduate degree and a Master of Business Administration.

Kotchian, a Certified Public Accountant, worked for Price Waterhouse in Los Angeles. He was hired in 1941 by Vega Airplane Company, a subsidiary of Lockheed Aircraft. At Lockheed, he supervised the firm's surge in aircraft production during World War II. He established the firm's manufacturing site in Marietta, Georgia, which became the primary production location for the C-130 Hercules cargo plane and later for the F-22 Raptor fighter. He became president of Lockheed in 1967, a period in which the firm produced the C-5 Galaxy cargo plane and the SR-71 Blackbird spy plane for the U.S. military and the L-1011 TriStar jet for the commercial market.

Development of the L-1011 began in the late 1960s, during Kotchian's presidency, and was started without any firm orders. In 1971, the United States government provided a $250 million loan to help bail the firm out of mounting development costs for military programs and for the L-1011. In testimony before the United States Senate in 1976, Kotchian described how he had met with government officials in Japan and made a payoff of 500 million yen, the equivalent of US$1.7 million, part of a total of US$12 million in payments to Japanese politicians and businessmen that led to the sale of 21 L-1011 aircraft by Lockheed, then worth US$430 million. Prime Minister of Japan Kakuei Tanaka was ultimately convicted of accepting a bribe, one of many notable Japanese politicians who were involved in the scandal.

In his Senate testimony, Kotchian disclosed that Lockheed paid $1.1 million in the early 1960s to a Dutch official later identified as Prince Bernhard, husband of Queen Juliana of the Netherlands in his role as inspector general of the Military of the Netherlands. After the revelations, the prince stepped down from his military position.

In a 1977 profile in The New York Times, Kotchian reflected his bitterness at the Lockheed directors who ousted him as chief operating officer and vice chairman in March 1976 based on his $38 million of what the board called "questionable payments". Kotchian described that he felt that

Lockheed has become the scapegoat for 300 companies that the S.E.C. said were doing the same thing, and Haughton and I are the scapegoats for the scapegoat.... Some call it gratuities. Some call them questionable payments. Some call it extortion. Some call it grease. Some call it bribery. I look at these payments as necessary to sell a product. I never felt I was doing anything wrong.

A resident of Palo Alto, California, Kotchian died at age 94 on December 14, 2008. He had been married to the former Lucy Elizabeth Carr who had died in 2002.
