= Rare Bird Books =

American publishing house

- Founder: Tyson Cornell
- Country of origin: United States
- Headquarters location: Los Angeles
- Distribution: Simon & Schuster
- Publication types: Books
- Imprints: California Coldblood, Barnacle Book, Vireo, Archer
- Official website: www.rarebirdbooks.com

Rare Bird Books is an American publishing house. It was founded by Tyson Cornell, the former director of publicity and marketing at Book Soup. Rare Bird has five imprints: California Coldblood, which is focused on sci-fi and similar genres; A Barnacle Book, which produces crime fiction, memoirs, and Hollywood literature; A Vireo Book; Archer; and Rare Bird Books itself.

Cornell, who published Bonnie Weinstein's 2014 book, To the Far Right Christian Hater ... You Can Be a Good Speller or a Hater, But You Can't Be Both: Official Hate Mail, Threats, and Criticism From the Archives of the Military Religious Freedom Foundation, told an interviewer in that he is "disgusted" by hate mail.

== Book cancellation ==
In 2019, Rare Bird became the subject of national attention when it cancelled a book by first time novelist Natasha Tynes. Tynes, a writer in Washington, D.C., had tweeted out an image of a uniformed black female Washington Metro employee eating on the train. Social media users criticized Tynes, accusing her of racism, linking the episode to other famous cases of black people reported to the police for everyday actions. Rare Books called Tynes' actions "truly horrible" and cancelled distribution of her novel, telling the author that "did something truly horrible today in tweeting a picture of a metro worker eating her breakfast on the train this morning and drawing attention to her employer. Black women face a constant barrage of this kind of inappropriate behavior directed toward them and a constant policing of their bodies... We think this is unacceptable and have no desire to be involved with anyone who thinks it's acceptable to jeopardize a person's safety and employment in this way.” Amidst the controversy, Texas multimedia company Cinestate acquired the book to be the first title launched under their new Rebeller literary imprint, part of a larger lifestyle brand that also encompassed an action movie label and website. The book was released in April 2020, two months before Cinestate shut down amidst a sexual abuse scandal.
