= A-Mark Precious Metals =

American precious metals trading company

Gold.com, Inc. (previously known as A-Mark Precious Metals, Inc.)
- Type: Public
- Traded as: NYSE: GOLD
- Industry: Metals
- Predecessor: Spectrum Group International (2005–2014) (as subsidiary)
- Founded: 1965; 2014 (as public company)
- Founder: Steven Markoff
- Headquarters: 1550 Scenic Ave., Suite 150, Costa Mesa, CA 92626
- Key people: Gregory Roberts (CEO) Thor Gjerdrum (President)
- Revenue: ▲US$7.6 billion (2021)
- Operating income: ▲US$193 million (2021)
- Net income: ▲US$160 million (2021)
- Owners: Publicly held
- Number of employees: 218 (2021)
- Subsidiaries: Collateral Finance Corporation (CFC); Goldline International; JM Bullion; GOVMINT
- Website: www.gold.com

A-Mark Precious Metals (founded in 1965 as A Mark Coin Company) is a precious metals trading company. It was the first company allowed to make and sell coins from the metals recovered in the shipwreck of SS Gairsoppa. On December 2, 2025, A-Mark Precious Metals officially rebranded as Gold.com, Inc. and transferred its common shares from Nasdaq to the New York Stock Exchange (NYSE) under the symbol "GOLD".

== History ==
Greg Manning Auctions Inc. bought a majority stake in A-Mark for $16 million in 2005. Thereafter, the firm changed its name to Escala Group, then to Spectrum Group International Inc. In 2009, it purchased the remainder of A-Mark. In 2014, Spectrum spun off A-Mark so that it could be publicly traded. A-Mark acquired Goldline International in 2017.

== Corporate affairs ==
=== Shareholder structure ===
As of 2021, A-Mark stock is in held by institutional investors (43%), the general public (29%) and private companies (7%). Individual insiders hold about 21%.

=== Financial results ===
Following its initial public offering A-Mark has grown its revenue from US$5.9 billion in 2015 to US7.6 billion in 2021. The following list is an overview of the main financial results from recent years:

Data	2017	2018	2019	2020	2021
Net revenue (in million)	$6,989	$7,606	$4,783	$5,416	$7,613
Gross profit (in million)	$31.33	$29.44	$31.96	$66.97	$210.20
