= President's Commission on Organized Crime =

The President's Commission on Organized Crime was a United States governmental body that existed during the Ronald Reagan administration. It was established by Executive Order 12435 in 1984. Its chairman was Judge Irving Kaufman. It issued a final report in 1986 (published in 1987), when it was disestablished. The Commission published seven volumes of hearings, including ones on money laundering, Asian organized crime, cocaine trafficking, heroin trafficking, labor-management racketeering, and gambling. It also published three interim reports on money laundering, labor racketeering, and drug trafficking.

== See also ==
- Wickersham Commission
- United States Senate Special Committee to Investigate Crime in Interstate Commerce
- United States Senate Select Committee on Improper Activities in Labor and Management
- President's Commission on Law Enforcement and Administration of Justice
